= Quagmire (The X-Files) =

- The X-Files episode
- "Big Blue" moves silently through the water. The scene, created using digital effects, was criticized by several critics.
- Episode no.: Season 3 Episode 22
- Directed by: Kim Manners
- Written by: Kim Newton
- Production code: 3X22
- Original air date: May 3, 1996
- Running time: 42 minutes

Guest appearances
- Chris Ellis as Sheriff Lance Hindht; Timothy Webber as Dr. Paul Farraday; R. Nelson Brown as Ansel Bray; Mark Acheson as Ted Bertram; Peter Hanlon as Dr. William Bailey; Tyler Labine as Stoner; Nicole Parker as Chick; Terrance Leigh as Snorkel Dude

Episode chronology
← Previous "Avatar"	Next → "Wetwired"
- The X-Files season 3

"Quagmire" is the twenty-second episode of the third season of the science fiction television series The X-Files. It premiered on the Fox network in the United States on May 3, 1996. It was written by Kim Newton and directed by Kim Manners. The episode is a "monster of the week" story, unconnected to the series' wider mythology. "Quagmire" earned a Nielsen household rating of 10.2, being watched by 16 million viewers in its initial broadcast. The episode received mostly positive reviews from television critics.

The show centers on FBI special agents Fox Mulder (David Duchovny) and Dana Scully (Gillian Anderson) who work on cases linked to the paranormal, called X-Files. Mulder is a believer in the paranormal, while the skeptical Scully has been assigned to debunk his work. In this episode, Mulder and Scully investigate a series of deaths at a lake in Georgia that Mulder believes were caused by a "sea" monster that the locals have affectionately named Big Blue.

Although the episode was written by Newton, noted writer Darin Morgan provided assistance on the script. Because of this, the episode contains several references to previous Morgan-penned episodes, like "Clyde Bruckman's Final Repose" and "War of the Coprophages". It is the last episode to feature Scully's dog, Queequeg, and the only one to mention the dog's name. One specific dialogue scene featuring Mulder and Scully stranded on a small rock was praised by critics and included approximately 10 pages of dialogue. Series co-star Gillian Anderson later recalled that she "loved" the scene.

== Plot ==
In Millikan, Georgia, biologists Paul Farraday and William Bailey discuss the decreasing frog population. Bailey goes looking for a missing beeper and ends up getting dragged into the lake by an unseen creature and killed.

Agents Fox Mulder (David Duchovny) and Dana Scully (Gillian Anderson) drive down to Lake Heuvelmans, Georgia, to investigate. Scully is forced to bring her dog Queequeg with them due to the short notice. Mulder tells Scully that a Boy Scout Troop Leader has also disappeared near the lake. Scully soon finds that Mulder believes "Big Blue"—a plesiosaur-like cryptid—is responsible. The agents talk to Dr. Farraday and visit a local bait and tackle shop that sells Big Blue merchandise. Soon afterwards, the half-eaten body of the Scout Leader is found.

Later that night, the bait and tackle shop owner walks through the swamp in boots, making fake dinosaur tracks. However, he is attacked and killed. Mulder wants the lake to be closed but the local sheriff declines and says that he does not have enough men to cover the 48 miles of shoreline. Two teenagers, previously seen in the episode "War of the Coprophages", head to the lake to lick toads; while experimenting, a diver friend of theirs is suddenly attacked underwater and his severed head floats to the surface. Scully, still skeptical about Big Blue being the killer, thinks that a boat propeller was responsible. A photographer named Ansel is also attacked just as he was frantically taking pictures of the creature. After falling into the lake and feeling something in the water, the Sheriff orders the lake closed. While Mulder looks at Ansel's photographs later that night, Scully takes Queequeg for a walk; the dog, sensing something in the nearby woods, ends up running off and disappearing (yelping is heard), becoming the latest victim of the attacks and leaving Scully saddened. Mulder realizes that the Big Blue sightings have been occurring closer and closer to shore.

Mulder and Scully rent a boat and head out onto the lake; their boat is quickly struck by something and sinks. The two find a large rock to climb up on and talk for a while about Mulder's quest to catch Big Blue, and the book Moby-Dick. When Dr. Farraday walks by the two realize they were close to shore all along. Mulder thinks the drop in the frog supply has caused Big Blue to move closer to shore and seek alternative food sources. Farraday is soon attacked but manages to make it out alive. Mulder chases the attacker into the woods and fires at it, revealing it to be an alligator. Mulder is disappointed that the killer ended up being an alligator and not Big Blue. As the agents leave, Big Blue swims nearby in the lake, unnoticed.

== Production ==
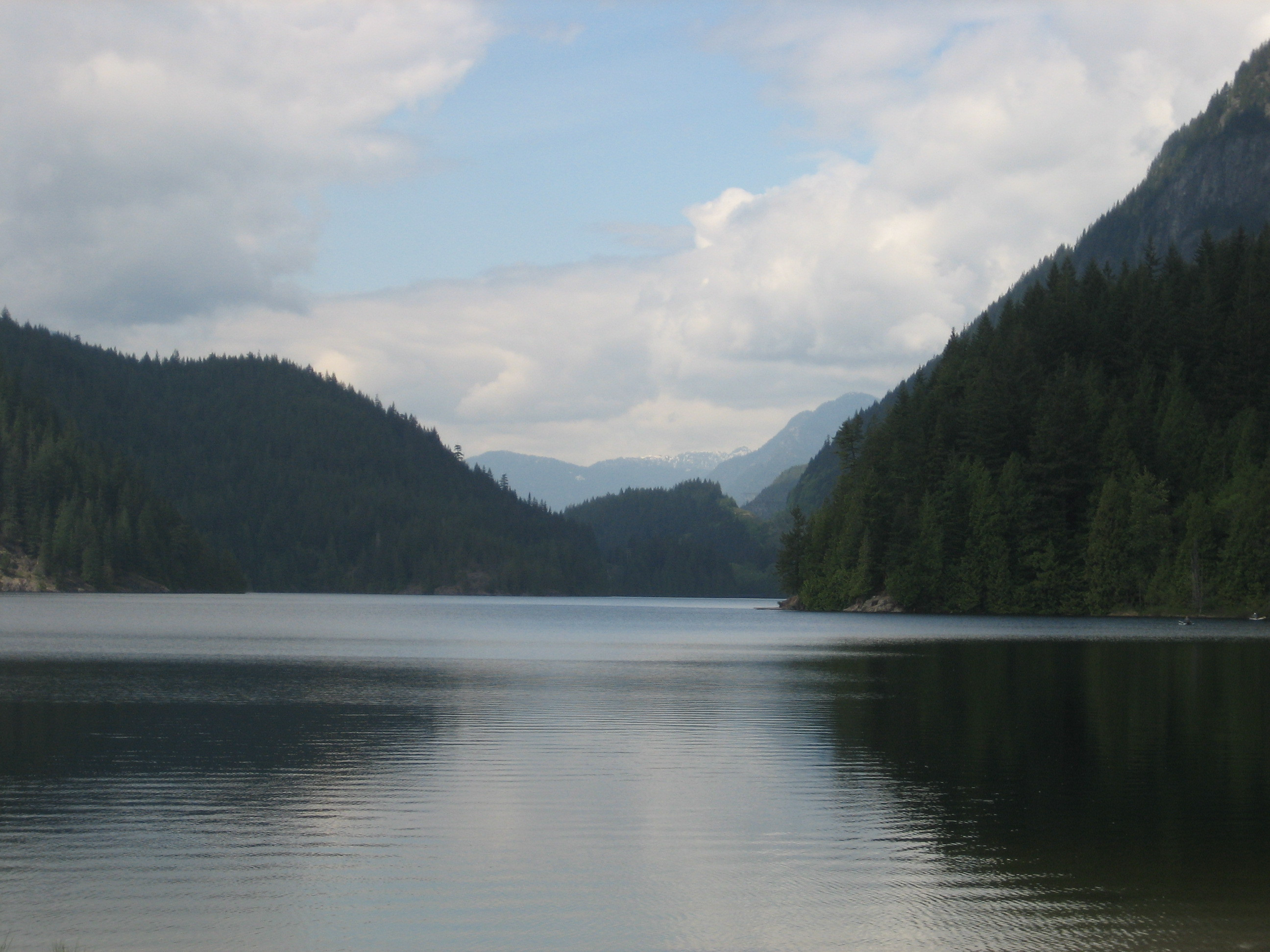
Exterior shots for the episode were filmed at a variety of locales, including Buntzen Lake, in the Greater Vancouver area.

=== Writing ===
"Quagmire" was written by Kim Newton, with substantial revisions courtesy of fellow writer Darin Morgan. As such, several references to previous Morgan-penned episodes make an appearance in "Quagmire". For instance, Scully's dog Queequeg, which first appeared in the episode "Clyde Bruckman's Final Repose" is killed in this episode. Then-story editor Frank Spotnitz claimed that the dog was brought back simply to kill it off. "'Stoner' kid" (Tyler Labine) and "hesitant 'Chick'" (Nicole Parker) both first appeared in the episode "War of the Coprophages". The episode also contained various series in-jokes and pop culture references. Millikan County, where the lake in the episode is located, derives it names from casting director Rick Millikan. The boat that Mulder and Scully ride on in this episode, the Patricia Rae, is named after the mother of director Kim Manners. Mulder's discussion about having a wooden leg references the book Games People Play.

=== Filming ===
The episode was filmed around three British Columbian lakes: Buntzen Lake, north of Coquitlam; Pitt Lake, north of Pitt Meadows; and Rice Lake, part of the Seymour Demonstration Forest. Buntzen Lake was used for shots of the quagmire reeds. Pitt Lake was used for shots of the boat dock and Ted's Bait and Tackle Shop. Finally, Rice Lake and the Seymour Demonstration Forest were used for the final scene, featuring a discreet shot of Big Blue. The conversation scene was filmed on a "Rocky Island Set" at B.C. Research Wave Tank. During the day of filming, the artificial rock set was placed in the tank and filled with water. However, the rock set began to float and "an emergency crew of carpenters [...] worked furiously through the night" to reattach the platform. For the final scene of Big Blue, the producers had originally intended for a boat to pull a rubber sea serpent through the water, but they were unhappy with how it turned out. After attempts to enhance it digitally failed, Big Blue was created entirely with CGI technology.

Director Kim Manners said of the episode: "Not a great show, but a good one. It's a lighter show. There is a lot of humor in it, but I think it's a hit with fans because there is some wonderful Mulder and Scully's relationship stuff. The entire third act is just the two of them talking, which is actually kind of interesting. The scene where Mulder and Scully talk while stranded on a rock comprised 10 pages of dialogue. Gillian Anderson said of the scene: "I loved that. That was so much fun, and I think it was written really well... It was just neat to have us separated from everything and stuck on this island where we could wax philosophical and kind of tell the truth to each other in strange ways."

== Reception ==
=== Ratings ===
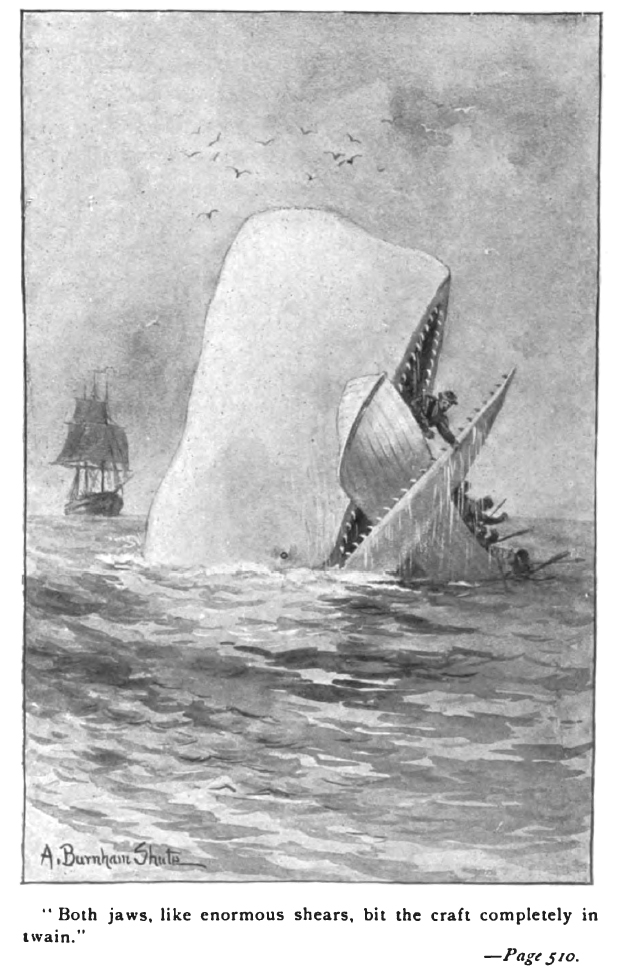
Mulder and Scully's conversation about Moby Dick was positively received by critics.

"Quagmire" premiered on the Fox network in the United States on May 3, 1996. The episode earned a Nielsen rating of 10.2, with an 18 share, meaning that roughly 10.2 percent of all television-equipped households, and 18 percent of households watching television, were tuned in to the episode. The episode was watched by a total of 16 million viewers.

=== Reviews ===
Critical reception to the episode was mostly positive. Many reviews praised the Moby Dick conversation between Mulder and Scully. Zack Handlen of The A.V. Club was positive towards the episode, grading it an A−. He wrote that it "starts off amazingly" and positively noted the way the monster was handled. However, he noted that it was the "linger[ing]" conversation scene that "sets 'Quagmire' apart from all the other standard Monster Of The Week procedurals." John Keegan of Critical Myth gave the episode an 8 out of 10 rating, noting "Overall, this episode was a strong look into the psychological issues that Mulder and Scully are carrying around this season. The plot of the episode is little more than a tool chosen to pry into the minds of the two agents, revealing just how dependent they are on each other. A rare case of character development taking center stage." Keegan also wrote positively of the conversation sequence, writing that the "isolation caused by the sinking of the boat [...] forces Mulder and Scully to actually discuss their issues." Robert Shearman, in his book Wanting to Believe: A Critical Guide to The X-Files, Millennium & The Lone Gunmen, rated the episode four stars out of five, calling it a "delightful little gem" and "something rather magical". In particular, Shearman praised Anderson and Duchovny's acting, calling their performances "beautifully played". Paula Vitaris of Cinefantastique gave the episode a positive review and awarded it three stars out of four. She referred to the episode as "part Jaws, part The Lost World, and part Buster Keaton" and noted that the third act was when the episode "becomes truly special, when Mulder and Scully are forced to abandon ship and take refuge on a big rock in the middle of a pitch-black night." Vitaris, however, was critical of the episode's closing shot, noting that the "shot destroys the story's ambiguity. A large ripple in the water would have been much more clever."

Not all reviews were so positive. Entertainment Weekly gave the episode a C and was critical of the entry's monster, writing "hey, the show kinda had to tackle Loch Ness". Furthermore, the review wrote that the episode was "notable only for Mulder and Scully's Moby Dick digression".

== See also ==
- Lake Placid

== Bibliography ==
- Edwards, Ted (1996). X-Files Confidential. Little, Brown and Company. ISBN 0-316-21808-1.
- Gradnitzer, Louisa; Pittson, Todd (1999). X Marks the Spot: On Location with The X-Files. Arsenal Pulp Press. ISBN 1-55152-066-4.
- Hurwitz, Matt; Knowles, Chris (2008). The Complete X-Files. Insight Editions. ISBN 978-1933784809.
- Lowry, Brian (1996). Trust No One: The Official Guide to the X-Files. Harper Prism. ISBN 0061053538.
- Shearman, Robert (2009). Wanting to Believe: A Critical Guide to The X-Files, Millennium & The Lone Gunmen. Mad Norwegian Press. ISBN 978-0-9759446-9-1.
