= Syzygy (The X-Files) =

- The X-Files episode
- Episode no.: Season 3 Episode 13
- Directed by: Rob Bowman
- Written by: Chris Carter
- Production code: 3X13
- Original air date: January 26, 1996
- Running time: 44 minutes

Guest appearances
- Dana Wheeler-Nicholson as Angela White; Wendy Benson as Margi Kleinjan; Lisa Robin Kelly as Terri Roberts; Garry Davey as Bob Spitz; Denalda Williams as Madame Zirinka; Gabrielle Miller as Brenda Jaycee Summerfield; Ryan Reynolds as Jay "Boom" DeBoom

Episode chronology
← Previous "War of the Coprophages"	Next → "Grotesque"
- The X-Files season 3

"Syzygy" is the thirteenth episode of the third season of the science fiction television series The X-Files. The episode first aired in the United States on January 26, 1996, on Fox. It was written by series creator Chris Carter and directed by Rob Bowman, and featured guest appearances from Dana Wheeler-Nicholson, Lisa Robin Kelly, and Ryan Reynolds.

The show centers on FBI special agents Fox Mulder (David Duchovny) and Dana Scully (Gillian Anderson) who work on cases linked to the paranormal, called X-Files. In this episode, Mulder and Scully investigate the murders of high school students in a small town where everyone is acting strangely. They discover that two teens are responsible, due to a rare planetary alignment that affects their behavior.

The episode is a "monster-of-the-week" story, unconnected to the series' wider mythology. "Syzygy" earned a Nielsen household rating of 10.8, being watched by 16.04 million people in its initial broadcast. The episode received mixed reviews, with many critics and fans upset by the negative portrayal of Mulder and Scully.

The episode's title refers to an astronomical alignment of three celestial objects, usually the sun, the Earth, and a moon or planet. In addition, the episode contained various fan in-jokes, such as Scully getting upset because Mulder is always the driver, which was inspired by complaints from fans.

== Plot ==
In Comity, New Hampshire, a group of high school students hold a eulogy for their dead friend, the purported victim of a local Satanic cult. Two girls, Terri Roberts (Lisa Robin Kelly) and Margi Kleinjan (Wendy Benson), get a ride home from a jock, Jay "Boom" DeBoom (Ryan Reynolds). The girls tell Boom that the cult seeks a blonde virgin as a next victim, convincing him to turn off the road. The next day, the police find Boom hanging from a cliff. Out of sight of the police, Terri and Margi sit at the top, laughing.

Fox Mulder (David Duchovny) and Dana Scully (Gillian Anderson) arrive in Comity after arguing over directions along the way. They meet a local detective, Angela White (Dana Wheeler-Nicholson), and go to Boom's funeral. Scully, in a bad mood, is skeptical of these claims. The high school principal, Bob Spitz, interrupts the funeral by ranting about Satanic cults murdering their children when suddenly the coffin starts smoking and catches on fire. Mulder and Scully go into separate rooms to interview Margi and Terri, both of whom offer an identical story about a satanic ceremony where a baby was sacrificed. Scully thinks their stories are clichéd and points out that no account of a satanic conspiracy has ever been validated. Looking at the latest victim's body, Mulder and Detective White find a burn mark in the shape of a horned beast; Scully says she doesn't see anything. Mulder goes to see White to apologize for Scully's behavior and the two visit the local astrologist Madame Zirinka, who claims the town's crazy behavior is due to the rare planetary alignment of the planets Mars, Uranus, and Mercury. Terri and Margi watch basketball practice, lusting over one of the players, Scott, whose girlfriend is cheerleader Brenda (much to Terri and Margi's displeasure). When another of the players accidentally spills a table of drinks on them, they cause the basketball to bounce underneath the bleachers, which retract and slam shut on the boy when he goes to get the ball, killing him. Scully is angry at Mulder for ditching her to be with Detective White.

A town mob searches for a mass grave in the woods and finds a bag belonging to the town pediatrician filled with bones, which Spitz assumes belonged to a child. The angry mob goes to see the doctor, who claims that he had sold the bag to Terri Roberts. The bones turn out to belong to Terri's dog, Mr Tippy. Scully gets upset over a joke Mulder makes and tells him she's returning to Washington. Margi and Terri celebrate their birthday and Brenda uses a Ouija board to know who she will marry; everyone thinks it's Scott before the planchette veers away from the C and spells out Satan. Upset, Brenda rushes to the bathroom where Margi and Terri are chanting "Bloody Mary" and is locked in, then killed by glass from a shattered mirror. Detective White heads to Mulder's hotel room because she found a box which inside had her cat's collar, and then she attempts to seduce Mulder, but they are interrupted by Scully, who informs them about Brenda's death. Terri and Margi try to console Scott, who tells them off. Turned down, Terri is mad at him but Margi still likes him and leaves.

Mulder goes to visit Madame Zirinka again, who tells him that the planets come into alignment like this only once every 84 years, and additional alignments will cause anyone born on January 12, 1979 (Margi and Terri's birthdate) to have an abundance of cosmic energy. Margi goes to see Scott alone but an angry Terri arrives. The two argue with each other and end up accidentally killing Scott after causing one of the springs and the garage door to fly at him. Margi goes to Mulder, telling him that Terri is responsible for the murders, while Terri goes to see Scully and tells her the opposite. The agents call each other and bring both girls to the police station, where the place starts shaking, causing the furniture to move around and all the guns to go off on their own. Mulder locks the girls in a room together and their power goes away once the clock ticks midnight. When the town mob and Detective White finally see Terri and Margi as the culprits, Spitz claims it was the work of Satan. Mulder and Scully drive home, arguing again over directions; when Scully defiantly runs a stop sign, Mulder notifies her but she tells him to shut up, which he does.

== Production ==
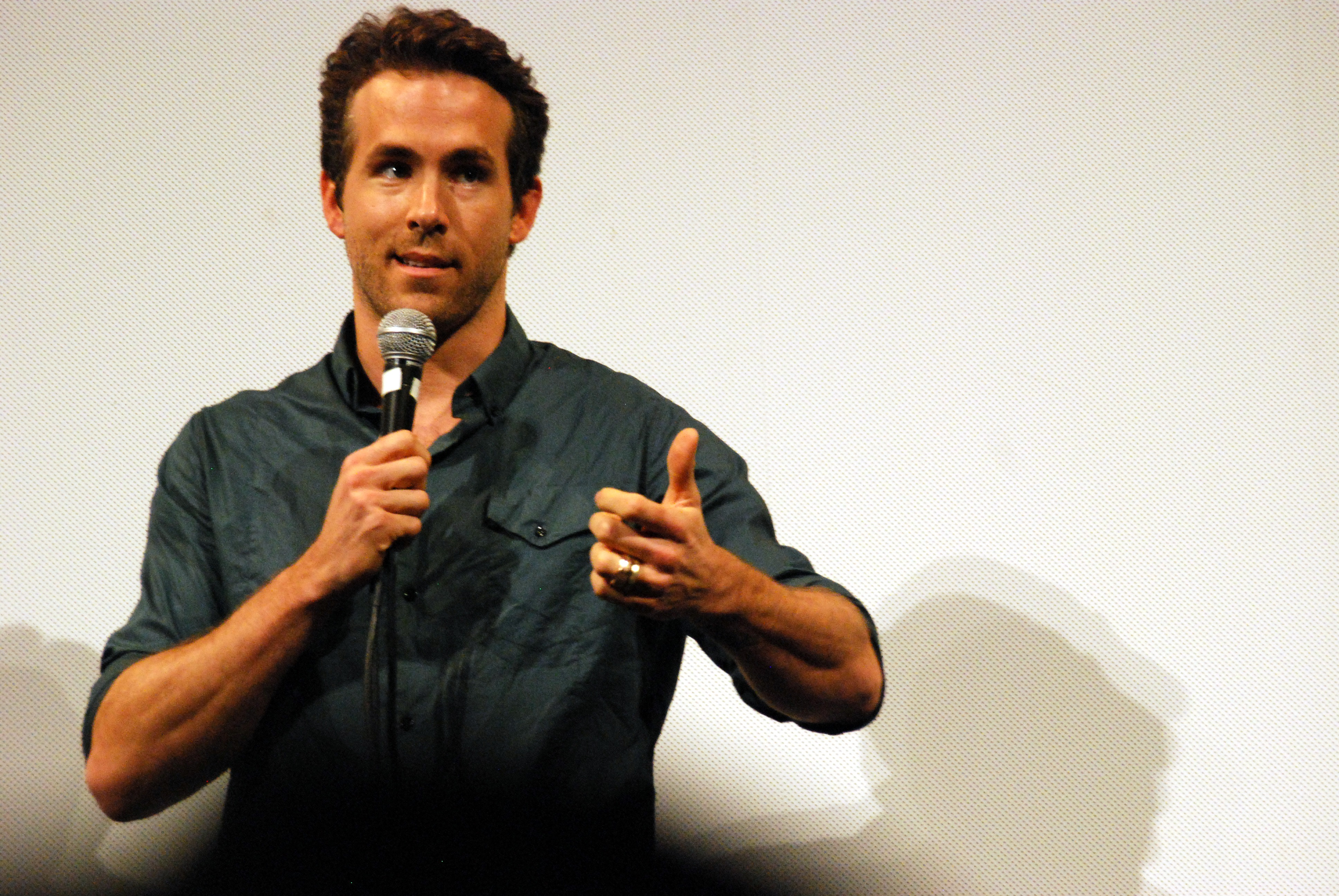
Ryan Reynolds appeared as a teenager in the episode.

The episode was written by series creator Chris Carter and directed by Rob Bowman. Bowman was "not a fan of the episode", saying:

The show proved to be much more difficult than I anticipated, and there wasn't enough time to shoot the show properly because we were so close to the Christmas break. I felt extremely pressured and frustrated, although there are things in it I love, particularly the banter between Mulder and Scully. But overall, I thought the show was very oblique. I don't feel that the characters ever knew what was going on and I don't think it is all that cool that kids are murdering people. I didn't feel like I was shooting an episode of The X-Files, and I think I let Chris Carter down a bit.

The name of this episode, "Syzygy," refers to a straight-line astronomical alignment of three or more celestial bodies in a gravitational system. The name of Grover Cleveland Alexander High School, the setting for much of the action in this episode, references a Jeopardy! question that series co-star David Duchovny got wrong when he appeared on the show. The scene where Mulder sees a Keystone Cops movie on every television channel was originally meant to include the movie A Clockwork Orange (1971), but the rights to the footage were too expensive so the producers settled on another choice. Carter felt that in retrospect it ended up being a better fit.

Mulder and Scully's fight about Mulder always driving was based on fan critiques about how Mulder was usually the one driving the car; according to series co-star Gillian Anderson this complaint had been raised at "the beginning of the show". Mulder's joke about Scully's "little feet" was a joke that Carter had made before at a fan convention in Pasadena, California. Regarding the tone of this episode, Duchovny later explained that the show's comedic episodes were generally more ludicrous than others, saying, "There's The X-Files of the stand-alone, and then there's The X-Files of the mythology, and then there are the comedic X-Files as well, in which the characters are really not quite the characters that we know."

== Reception ==
"Syzygy" premiered on the Fox network on January 26, 1996. The episode earned a Nielsen household rating of 10.8 with a 17 share, meaning that roughly 10.8 percent of all television-equipped households, and 17 percent of households watching television, were tuned in to the episode. A total of 16.04 million viewers watched this episode during its original airing.

The episode received mixed reviews from critics. Entertainment Weekly gave "Syzygy" an A, describing the episode as "another uproarious send-up, this time of teen venom, B-movie paranoia, and our agents' painfully restrained rapport", with praise to the villains and the discussion on why Mulder always drives, considered "one of Mulder's and Scully's funniest exchanges". Emily VanDerWerff of The A.V. Club gave a B−, describing it as "an entertaining hour that never rises to the level of those other episodes" like "Humbug" and "War of the Coprophages". VanDerWerff argued that "Syzygy" was an attempt by Carter to try and emulate the writing style of Darin Morgan's scripts, without success; she noted "the laughs here are emptier than they were the week before in 'Coprophages'"—and adding that "every time you think the episode has figured out a way to plant its foot firmly in comedic territory, there's a horribly judged moment of 'drama,' like Mulder's final monologue." Connie Ogle of Popmatters listed Margi and Terri among the best monster-of-the-week characters of the series, describing "Syzygy" as a "hilarious send-up of Heathers".

Not all reviews were positive. Paula Vitaris from Cinefantastique gave the episode a moderately negative review and awarded it one-and-a-half stars out of four. Vitaris called the outing "a lost opportunity," noting that the episode's humor "falls flat, because the humor exists in a vacuum". Furthermore, she argued that if the episode had been played-straight, then "Syzygy" could have "been a horror classic". Robert Shearman, in his book Wanting to Believe: A Critical Guide to The X-Files, Millennium & The Lone Gunmen, rated the episode two stars out of five and criticized it for following too closely on the heels of Darin Morgan's "War of the Coprophages", which he felt was a superior episode. Shearman further noted that the episode was "simply not very funny". Fox Mulder and Dana Scully's odd behavior towards each other resulted in criticism from critics and fans on the Internet. Vitaris called the relationship between Mulder and Scully in the episode "ugly". Shearman called the scenes featuring Mulder and Scully's bickering "hard to stomach". Chris Carter was somewhat disappointed in the reaction that the episode received, stating that there were hints to the satiric nature of the episode strewn throughout "Syzygy" that fans simply did not understand. Other fans understood what transpired, but disliked the episode due to their desire for Mulder and Scully to become a romantically involved couple. X-Files fans in San Francisco printed up T-shirts featuring the phrase "Sure. Fine. Whatever." spoken multiple times by Scully in this episode.

== Bibliography ==
- Edwards, Ted (1996). X-Files Confidential. Little, Brown and Company. ISBN 0-316-21808-1.
- Hurwitz, Matt; Knowles, Chris (2008). The Complete X-Files. Insight Editions. ISBN 978-1-933784-80-9.
- Lowry, Brian (1996). Trust No One: The Official Guide to the X-Files. Harper Prism. ISBN 0-06-105353-8.
- Shearman, Robert; Pearson, Lars (2009). Wanting to Believe: A Critical Guide to The X-Files, Millennium & The Lone Gunmen. Mad Norwegian Press. ISBN 978-0-9759446-9-1.
