= Wetwired =

- The X-Files episode
- Episode no.: Season 3 Episode 23
- Directed by: Rob Bowman
- Written by: Mat Beck
- Production code: 3X23
- Original air date: May 10, 1996
- Running time: 44 minutes

Guest appearances
- Mitch Pileggi as Walter Skinner; William B. Davis as Cigarette Smoking Man; Steven Williams as X; Sheila Larken as Margaret Scully; Tom Braidwood as Melvin Frohike; Dean Haglund as Richard Langly; Bruce Harwood as John Fitzgerald Byers; Colin Cunningham as Dr. Stroman; Tim Henry as Plain Clothed Man; Linden Banks as Joseph Patnik; Crystal Verge as Dr. Lorenz; Andre Danyliu as Country Coroner; Joe Maffei as Motel Manager; John McConnach as Officer #1; Joe DoSerro as Officer #2; Heather McCarthy as Duty Nurse

Episode chronology
← Previous "Quagmire"	Next → "Talitha Cumi"
- The X-Files season 3

"Wetwired" is the twenty-third episode of the third season and the 72nd episode overall of the science fiction television series The X-Files. The episode first aired in the United States on May 10, 1996, on Fox. It was written by the show's visual effect designer Mat Beck, and directed by Rob Bowman. The episode earned a Nielsen rating of 9.7 and was viewed by 14.48 million people. The episode received mostly positive reviews from television critics.

The show centers on FBI special agents Fox Mulder (David Duchovny) and Dana Scully (Gillian Anderson) who work on cases linked to the paranormal, called X-Files. Mulder is a believer in the paranormal, while the skeptical Scully has been assigned to debunk his work. In this episode, Mulder and Scully investigate a series of murders committed by ordinary citizens angered after seeing illusory images. Scully's trust in Mulder is put to the ultimate test.

"Wetwired" was written by Mat Beck, the show's visual effects supervisor. Beck drew inspiration from debates about television violence and his desire to explore the effect that television has on people. Actor Steven Williams had scheduling conflicts due to his work on the series L.A. Heat, resulting in the creation of the Plain Clothed Man, who appeared in the episode as an emissary for X. Williams called his scene at the end of the episode with The Smoking Man one of his favorite scenes he performed on the show.

== Plot ==
In Braddock Heights, Maryland, a man mistakenly kills his wife, believing her, as well as the police who soon arrive, to all be someone else. Fox Mulder (David Duchovny) is tipped off to the case by the mysterious Plain-Clothed Man, who provides him with a newspaper article discussing the case. Mulder and partner Dana Scully (Gillian Anderson) visit the man, and his doctor, Dr. Stroman, in a psychiatric hospital and are told the man killed five people, believing them to all be the same person.

Mulder and Scully visit the murderer's house, where Mulder sees a repairman working on the cable line. They find hundreds of video tapes of a cable news channel. Scully believes all the violence the man watched on TV may have led him to the murders, something Mulder does not believe. That night Scully watches the tapes, seeing if there are any clues to why the man committed murder. She steps outside for a break and sees Mulder in a car talking to the Cigarette Smoking Man. In the morning Scully suspiciously asks Mulder if he moved the car in the night. When Mulder tells her he only went out for a paper earlier, she believes he is lying. The next day a similar murder occurs when a woman thinks she sees her husband in a hammock with another woman; in reality she has killed her neighbor who was in a hammock with his dog. Mulder sees the same cable repairman near the house, who escapes from him. Climbing up on the telephone pole Mulder finds a device inside the cable box.

Mulder brings the device to the Lone Gunmen, who tell him it is emitting some kind of signal. Mulder contacts Scully, who is growing increasingly paranoid. Hearing possible clicks while on the phone with Mulder, she frantically searches her hotel room for monitoring devices. When Mulder knocks at her door, Scully fires her weapon at it and runs off. Mulder believes her to be suffering from paranoid psychosis. The Lone Gunmen believe the device to be some sort of subliminal mind control device. Mulder was not affected due to his color blindness. The police find a body they believe to be that of Scully, but Mulder confirms that it is not her. Mulder is unable to contact Scully's mother, leading him to go to her house. He finds Scully there, who aims a gun at him. Scully claims Mulder never trusted her and blames him for her abduction and her sister's murder. Scully's mother calms her down, and she is hospitalized.

Mulder believes that the mind control device turns people's fears into paranoid delusions. Mulder tries to contact Dr. Stroman with no success. He traces Dr. Stroman's location to an empty hotel room where he finds a “Morley” cigarette butt in the ash tray. Using the phone log for the room Mulder tracks Stroman to a house where he spots him meeting with the cable repairman. However, by the time Mulder enters, shots ring out, and Mulder finds both men dead, with X (Steven Williams) responsible for their murders. X used a third party to inform Mulder, knowing he had orders to kill the men, but Mulder was not able to piece things together in time. Mulder calls him a coward but X tells Mulder that Mulder needs him. Later, X meets in a car with The Smoking Man (William B. Davis).

== Production ==
"Wetwired" was written by Mat Beck, who served as the series's visual effects supervisor. Beck was inspired to pen the episode after hearing the debates concerning violence on television and its effect on viewers. Beck's initial concept was more complex and pulled from neurology texts, but as the script progressed, it was simplified. Actor Steven Williams had scheduling conflicts due to his work on the series L.A. Heat, resulting in the creation of the "Plain Clothed Man", who appeared in the episode as an emissary for X. Paul Rabwin provided narration for a television show that plays in the background. Dana Scully's motel room as well as The Lone Gunmen's office were constructed on sound stage. The episode had late-stage sound problems which resulted in post-production dragging into the day the episode was scheduled to be broadcast.

Williams called his scene at the end of the episode with The Smoking Man one of his favorite scenes. Rob Bowman was happy with the final product and said, "I dug the script. I felt it was a good old-fashioned show, and people who didn't like 'Jose Chung's From Outer Space' would like 'Wetwired' because all the bad boys are back. A good clean steak-and-potatoes type of episode."

== Broadcast and reception ==
"Wetwired" premiered on the Fox network in the United States on May 10, 1996. The episode earned a Nielsen rating of 9.7, with a 17 share, meaning that roughly 9.7 percent of all television-equipped households, and 17 percent of households watching television, were tuned in to the episode. The episode was watched by a total of 14.48 million viewers.

The episode received moderately positive reviews from television critics. Entertainment Weekly gave the episode a B, noting its similarity to "Blood" but thought that "Anderson gives good unhinged". Zack Handlen of The A.V. Club graded it a B+, also noting the similarity to "Blood" but he did "not entirely [mean it] as a criticism". Handlen was a "little disappointed" about the Monster-of-the-Week, as the concept was not fully explored. John Keegan from Critical Myth gave the episode a positive review and awarded it an 8 out of 10. He wrote, "Overall, this was [a] strong psychological episode [...] melded with the conspiracy in a logical and consistent way. Some plot devices are a bit too contrived, but the strengths of the episode outweigh the weaknesses. Two great performances by David and Gillian give the episode the necessary gravitas, and there’s enough foreshadowing to make sense of some elements of the season finale." Robert Shearman, in his book Wanting to Believe: A Critical Guide to The X-Files, Millennium & The Lone Gunmen, rated the episode three-and-a-half stars out of five. The author compared the episode positively to the earlier second season episode "Blood" and wrote, "['Blood'] had a clever premise which didn't quite translate into an actual plot; here writer Mat Beck remedies that, very wisely". Shearman further praised the episode's ending that suggest X's days are almost certainly "numbered." Paula Vitaris of Cinefantastique gave the episode a moderately positive review and awarded it three stars out of four. She praised Anderson's acting, calling it "superb" and noting that watching Scully fall victim to insanity is "sickly fascinating".

== Bibliography ==
- Edwards, Ted (1996). X-Files Confidential. Little, Brown and Company. ISBN 0-316-21808-1.
- Hurwitz, Matt; Knowles, Chris (2008). The Complete X-Files. Insight Editions. ISBN 978-1-933784-80-9.
- Lowry, Brian (1996). Trust No One: The Official Guide to the X-Files. Harper Prism. ISBN 0-06-105353-8.
- Shearman, Robert (2009). Wanting to Believe: A Critical Guide to The X-Files, Millennium & The Lone Gunmen. Mad Norwegian Press. ISBN 978-0975944691.
