= The X-Files season 3 =

Season of television series

The X-Files
- Season 3
- DVD cover
- Starring: David Duchovny; Gillian Anderson
- No. of episodes: 24

Release
- Original network: Fox
- Original release: September 22, 1995 – May 17, 1996

Season chronology
- ← Previous; Season 2 Next → Season 4

The third season of the American science fiction television series The X-Files commenced airing on Fox in the United States on September 22, 1995, concluded on the same channel on May 17, 1996, and contained 24 episodes. The season continues to follow the cases of FBI special agents Fox Mulder and Dana Scully, portrayed by David Duchovny and Gillian Anderson respectively, who investigate paranormal or supernatural cases, known as X-Files by the FBI.

The season features the conclusion of several plot-lines introduced in season two, while also introducing several new plot elements. Major plot arcs include an elaborate conspiracy being discovered when an alien autopsy video is acquired by Mulder, Scully's search for the killer of her sister, and the mystery surrounding X (Steven Williams). Pivotal characters such as the First Elder (Don S. Williams) and the alien virus black oil were first introduced in this season. In addition, the season features a wide variety of "Monster-of-the-Week" episodes, stand-alone stories not of influence to the wider mythology of the series.

The season attained higher ratings than season two, the highest viewing audience the series had yet achieved. Season premiere "The Blessing Way" debuted with a Nielsen household rating of 19.94, which more than doubled the premiere of the last season. The ratings consistently stayed above 15.0, making it one of the most watched series of the 1995–96 television line-up. The season received generally positive reviews from television critics, winning five Primetime Emmy Awards. Many of the episodes written by writer Darin Morgan received critical acclaim, including the episodes "Clyde Bruckman's Final Repose" and "Jose Chung's From Outer Space" which are often cited as some of the best of the series. Morgan left the series following this season, due to an inability to keep up with the fast-paced nature of the show.

== Plot overview ==
The show centers on FBI special agents Fox Mulder (David Duchovny) and Dana Scully (Gillian Anderson) who work on cases linked to the paranormal, called X-Files. Mulder is later found in the desert following the events of the second season finale and nursed back to health by Albert Hosteen (Floyd Red Crow Westerman). Meanwhile, Scully investigates the possible involvement of the smallpox eradication program in human genetic experimentation, discovering that a Nazi scientist who defected during Operation Paperclip has been conducting human experimentation to create alien-human hybrids. Her sister Melissa (Melinda McGraw), however, is shot by assassins who mistake her for Dana, and dies in hospital that night.

Investigating evidence of an alien autopsy, Mulder infiltrates a secretive government train carriage carrying an alien-human hybrid. Mulder is almost killed by a Syndicate operative guarding the hybrid, but is saved by his informant X (Steven Williams). X had been tipped off about Mulder's activities by the agent's partner Dana Scully (Gillian Anderson). Scully, meanwhile, meets a group of women with abduction experiences similar to her own, and meets another member of the Syndicate known as the First Elder (Don S. Williams), who claims during her abduction she was placed on a similar train car and experimented upon by the Japanese scientists.

The crew of a French salvage ship trying to raise a World War II-era submarine from the sea floor are stricken with massive radiation burns—except for one, who has been infected with a parasitic black oil discovered on the submarine. The oil is controlling the crewman's body, and after passing through several hosts, has overtaken Alex Krycek (Nicholas Lea), whom Mulder has been pursuing. Scully finds that the submarine had been involved in discovering the oil on the sea floor during World War II, under the guise of finding a sunken fighter plane. The infected Krycek makes his way to a missile silo used to hide a UFO, and the oil escapes his body to board the craft. Meanwhile, Scully has tracked down Luis Cardinal, the man responsible for killing her sister.

== Writing ==
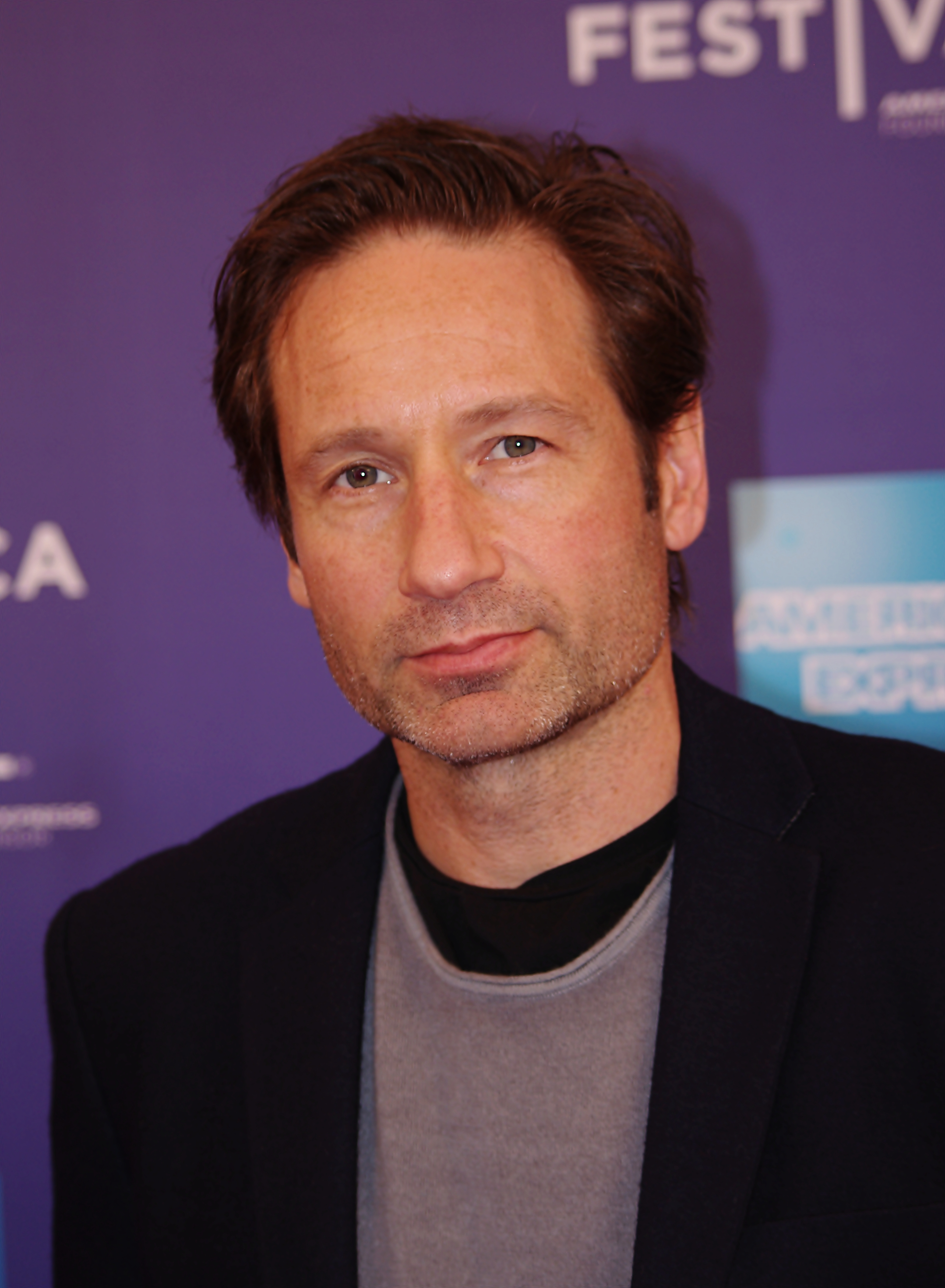
As with season two, David Duchovny received two writing credits in season three, including for the season finale.

Development of the first episode of the season, "The Blessing Way", began with the second-season finale "Anasazi". Both of those episodes, along with "Paper Clip", form a trilogy of episodes that began the third season. "Anasazi" was directed by R. W. Goodwin, who later directed the season finale "Talitha Cumi", and "Paper Clip" was directed by Rob Bowman. Bowman directed a total of eight episodes for the season, followed by Kim Manners who directed seven. Series creator Chris Carter also served as executive producer and showrunner and wrote eight episodes, directing one.

Darin Morgan had a small involvement in the second season, and was asked to contribute more content for the third. He first appeared in "The Host" as the Flukeman, and was brought on by his brother Glen Morgan to help write the episode "Blood". Morgan's first sole credit as a writer came in the episode "Humbug", which received a positive reception by the staff. David Duchovny expressed an enjoyment for working with Morgan, commenting "what I loved about his scripts was that he seemed to be trying to destroy the show."

Morgan wrote three episodes, but later left the series because he could not keep up with the fast-paced nature of network television. He also expressed a negative opinion of the way his teleplays were handled, despite a positive reception by both critics and the crew of his work. He also contributed to the script for the episode "Quagmire". After writing one episode the previous season, Vince Gilligan returned to write another solo episode for the season, now credited as a creative consultant. Cast member David Duchovny collaborated with Howard Gordon and Chris Carter for two episodes, receiving story credit.

New writers in the third season included story editor Jeffrey Vlaming who wrote two episodes, supervising producer Charles Grant Craig who wrote a single episode, Kim Newtown who wrote two episodes, and staff writer John Shiban who wrote two episodes. All new writers except Shiban did not return after this season. Series visual effects producer Mat Beck also wrote an episode. Other producers included production manager and producer Joseph Patrick Finn and co-producer Paul Rabwin.

== Themes ==
"Nisei" and "731", show a darker side to the series, exploring the public's distrust in the government. Other episodes dealing with the wider mythology of the series—"Talitha Cumi", "Piper Maru" and "Apocrypha"—explore similar concepts, showcasing the shadow government plot line of the series. Episodes like "2Shy" and "Pusher" feature sadistic villains, containing human beings capable of highly immoral acts despite their seemingly mundane appearances. Another episode with a serial killer antagonist, "Grotesque", revolves around the way that evil can change and influence people. "Oubliette" offers a sentimental and emotional plot driven by the kidnapping of a young girl. The episode features parallels to the real life Polly Klaas case and provides commentary on both stockholm syndrome and trauma.

Aliens and serial killers are not the only antagonists in the season; several episodes revolve around more traditional, B-movie inspired monsters, taking influence from horror films. These episodes include "War of the Coprophages" and "Quagmire", about killer cockroaches and a lake monster. Several episodes have satirical elements, including "D.P.O.", "Syzygy" and "War of the Coprophages", with the latter two showcasing how the public can create panic out of need. Both "Clyde Bruckman's Final Repose" and "Jose Chung's From Outer Space" play against tropes and the established formula of the series, subverting themes the series usually followed.

== Cast ==
=== Main cast ===
==== Starring ====
- David Duchovny as Special Agent Fox Mulder
- Gillian Anderson as Special Agent Dana Scully

==== Also starring ====
- Mitch Pileggi as Deputy Director Walter Skinner

=== Recurring cast ===
- William B. Davis as Cigarette Smoking Man
- Tom Braidwood as Melvin Frohike
- Bruce Harwood as John Fitzgerald Byers
- Dean Haglund as Richard Langly
- Nicholas Lea as Alex Krycek
- Brendan Beiser as Pendrell
- Lenno Britos as Luis Cardinal
- Don S. Williams as First Elder
- Steven Williams as X
- Sheila Larken as Margaret Scully
- John Neville as Well-Manicured Man
- Rebecca Toolan as Teena Mulder

=== Guest cast ===
- Peter Donat as William Mulder
- Jerry Hardin as Deep Throat
- Melinda McGraw as Melissa Scully
- Stephen McHattie as Red-Haired Man
- Morris Panych as Grey-Haired Man
- Floyd Westerman as Albert Hosteen
- Roy Thinnes as Jeremiah Smith
- Brian Thompson as Alien Bounty Hunter
- Robert Wisden as Robert Patrick Modell

== Episodes ==
Episodes marked with a double dagger (‡) are episodes in the series' Alien Mythology arc. (Note: The episodes were included in the DVD collections The X-Files Mythology, Volume 1 – Abduction and The X-Files Mythology, Volume 2 – Black Oil, released by Fox.)

No. overall	No. in season	Title	Directed by	Written by	Original release date	Prod. code	U.S. viewers (millions)
50	1	"The Blessing Way"‡	R. W. Goodwin	Chris Carter	September 22, 1995	3X01	19.94
The Cigarette Smoking Man works quickly to recover the stolen computer files, but finds himself thwarted by a man who he hoped was dead. Meanwhile, Scully finds herself at a loss for her next step and turns to her family for support, since Mulder is otherwise engaged fighting for survival.
51	2	"Paper Clip"‡	Rob Bowman	Chris Carter	September 29, 1995	3X02	17.20
Mulder and Scully search for answers regarding the old photograph with his father and other unnamed men. Their search takes them to the abandoned Strughold Mining Facility where they uncover a dangerous secret.
52	3	"D.P.O."	Kim Manners	Howard Gordon	October 6, 1995	3X03	15.57
Mulder is skeptical over a coroner's report regarding the fifth person to be struck by lightning in a small Oklahoma town. Their investigation into the latest death seems to point to the only person to have survived a lightning strike, an emotionally charged youth.
53	4	"Clyde Bruckman's Final Repose"	David Nutter	Darin Morgan	October 13, 1995	3X04	15.38
Skeptical of a famous psychic's predictions regarding the death of several prognosticators, Mulder instead finds someone whom he believes truly can predict the future. Catching the killer could prove difficult, though, particularly if the killer can also see into his future.
54	5	"The List"	Chris Carter	Chris Carter	October 20, 1995	3X05	16.72
A death row inmate makes good on his promise to come back from the dead and kill the five people involved in his death. The fear of his retribution has everyone scrambling to determine if they are on the list, while Mulder and Scully attempt to determine how he has returned to execute his tormentors.
55	6	"2Shy"	David Nutter	Jeffrey Vlaming	November 3, 1995	3X06	14.83
Meeting insecure women through an online service, a serial killer seduces his prey with the right words. However, Mulder and Scully determine these killings are far from ordinary by the presence of a strange substance coating the victims, a substance which seems to digest the fatty acids in flesh.
56	7	"The Walk"	Rob Bowman	John Shiban	November 10, 1995	3X07	15.91
Another suicide attempt by a patient in a military hospital interests Mulder with the talk of a "phantom soldier" who has prevented the man's death. The general in charge is at first opposed to the FBI's involvement until the phantom soldier begins haunting him. When the primary suspect is a quadruple amputee, they are met with ridicule.
57	8	"Oubliette"	Kim Manners	Charles Grant Craig	November 17, 1995	3X08	15.90
When a young teenage girl is kidnapped from her home, a fast food worker miles away collapses on the job, apparently experiencing exactly what the child is feeling. When Mulder learns that the woman was kidnapped and held hostage for years as a child, he begins to believe that she may be the key to help find the missing girl.
58	9	"Nisei"‡	David Nutter	Chris Carter & Howard Gordon & Frank Spotnitz	November 24, 1995	3X09	16.36
A mail order videotape of an alien autopsy blossoms into a much more complicated investigation when Mulder and Scully find the distributor of the tape killed in his own home apparently by a high-ranking Japanese diplomat. While Mulder's search for the video leads him to a train car, Scully investigates a Mutual UFO Network group and discovers several women who claim to know her.
59	10	"731"‡	Rob Bowman	Frank Spotnitz	December 1, 1995	3X10	17.68
Mulder is trapped on a train carriage that could be wired with a bomb, according to a killer who claims to be an NSA agent. Meanwhile, Scully digs deeper into the mystery surrounding her abduction.
60	11	"Revelations"	David Nutter	Kim Newton	December 15, 1995	3X11	15.25
Mulder tracks a series of religiously motivated homicides. Each of the eleven victims claims to have been stigmatic but all turned out to be frauds. When Mulder and Scully discover a little boy displaying inexplicable wounds of religious significance, they try to protect him from the killer they know will be coming.
61	12	"War of the Coprophages"	Kim Manners	Darin Morgan	January 5, 1996	3X12	16.32
A small town is plagued by deaths in which the bodies are found covered in cockroaches. Working from home, Scully has scientific explanations for all of them but Mulder—at the crime scene with an attractive bug expert—suspects the insects may not be organic, or earthly.
62	13	"Syzygy"	Rob Bowman	Chris Carter	January 26, 1996	3X13	16.04
Mulder and Scully investigate strange homicides in New Hampshire that may be due to a rare planetary alignment that affects people's behavior.
63	14	"Grotesque"	Kim Manners	Howard Gordon	February 2, 1996	3X14	18.32
Agents Mulder and Scully join Mulder's former mentor, the FBI's chief profiler, on a case involving a serial killer who claims to be possessed by a demonic force. The case gets even more mysterious when the suspect is apprehended and the killings continue. Mulder gets involved more deeply than expected and Scully as well as Skinner are deeply concerned.
64	15	"Piper Maru"‡	Rob Bowman	Frank Spotnitz & Chris Carter	February 9, 1996	3X15	16.44
When a French salvage ship sends a diving crew to recover a mysterious wreckage from World War II, the crew falls prey to a bizarre illness and Agents Mulder and Scully join the investigation. The investigation leads to the discovery of a familiar face, and to Skinner's life being threatened.
65	16	"Apocrypha"‡	Kim Manners	Frank Spotnitz & Chris Carter	February 16, 1996	3X16	16.71
While Mulder continues to investigate a bizarre illness that originated with the discovery of a mysterious World War II wreckage buried at sea, several government figures try to thwart their efforts. And as Skinner recovers from his shooting, Scully discovers that he is still in danger, from the man who killed her sister.
66	17	"Pusher"	Rob Bowman	Vince Gilligan	February 23, 1996	3X17	16.20
Agents Mulder and Scully's assistance is requested for a case involving a man seemingly capable of bending people to his will. The suspect uses his mysterious abilities to manipulate Agent Mulder into a dangerous end game.
67	18	"Teso Dos Bichos"	Kim Manners	John Shiban	March 8, 1996	3X18	17.38
A series of deaths occurs immediately after an ancient artifact is brought to Boston from an excavation site in Ecuador. According to Scully, the deaths appear to be the result of political terrorism, but Mulder suspects something more improbable.
68	19	"Hell Money"	Tucker Gates	Jeffrey Vlaming	March 29, 1996	3X19	14.86
A string of mysterious deaths of recent Chinese immigrants brings Agents Mulder and Scully to San Francisco's Chinatown. The Agents team up with a Chinese-American detective to better understand the language and customs of the Chinese culture, but one thing remains frighteningly clear—all of the bodies are missing various internal organs.
69	20	"Jose Chung's From Outer Space"	Rob Bowman	Darin Morgan	April 12, 1996	3X20	16.08
When a couple claims to have been abducted by aliens, Agents Mulder and Scully try to get at the truth but everyone has a different version of the story, including the "aliens" themselves.
70	21	"Avatar"	James Charleston	Story by : David Duchovny & Howard Gordon; Teleplay by : Howard Gordon	April 26, 1996	3X21	14.62
During a difficult time in assistant director Skinner's life, he meets a woman in a bar and spends the night with her. The next morning, the woman is dead and he is accused of murder. Agents Mulder and Scully join the investigation to clear their supervisor's name. As they unravel the threads of a conspiracy, they also learn more about Skinner's personal affairs.
71	22	"Quagmire"	Kim Manners	Kim Newton	May 3, 1996	3X22	16.00
When a series of mysterious deaths and disappearances are reported near a lake in a small town, Agents Mulder and Scully are called in to investigate. With local folklore of a killer sea serpent running rampant amongst the locals, the agents must take their search for the truth to the water.
72	23	"Wetwired"	Rob Bowman	Mat Beck	May 10, 1996	3X23	14.48
As the agents investigate a series of homicides committed by ordinary citizens angered after seeing illusory images, Scully's trust in Mulder is put to the ultimate test.
73	24	"Talitha Cumi"‡	R. W. Goodwin	Story by : David Duchovny & Chris Carter; Teleplay by : Chris Carter	May 17, 1996	3X24	17.86
Agents Mulder and Scully search for a man who seems to possess strange powers, which leads to the discovery of a dangerous secret from Mulder's past. The secret could bring Mulder and Scully to the brink of exposing the truth about alien existence.

== Reception ==
=== Ratings ===
The third season of The X-Files debuted with "The Blessing Way" on September 22, 1995. The episode earned a Nielsen household rating of 12.3, with a 22 share, meaning that roughly 12.3 percent of all television-equipped households, and 22 percent of households watching television, were tuned in to the episode. The episode was viewed by 19.94 million viewers. "The Blessing Way" was, at the time, the highest-rated episode of The X-Files to air. The previous record belonged to the season two entry "Fresh Bones", which scored an 11.3 rating with a 19 share. As the season continued, ratings dropped slightly and stabilized. After the season premiere, the highest-rated episode of the season was the finale, "Talitha Cumi", which was viewed by 17.86 million viewers. The season hit a low with the twenty-third and penultimate episode of the season, "Wetwired", which was viewed by 14.48 million viewers.

The series was ranked as number 55 during the 1995–96 television season, and was viewed by an average of 15.40 million viewers, an increase in almost seven percent when compared to the second season, which was viewed by 14.50. In its third season, The X-Files became Fox's top-rated program in the 18- to 49-year-old demographic. The third season of the show was the last to be aired on Friday nights. For its fourth season, the show was moved to Sunday.

=== Reviews ===
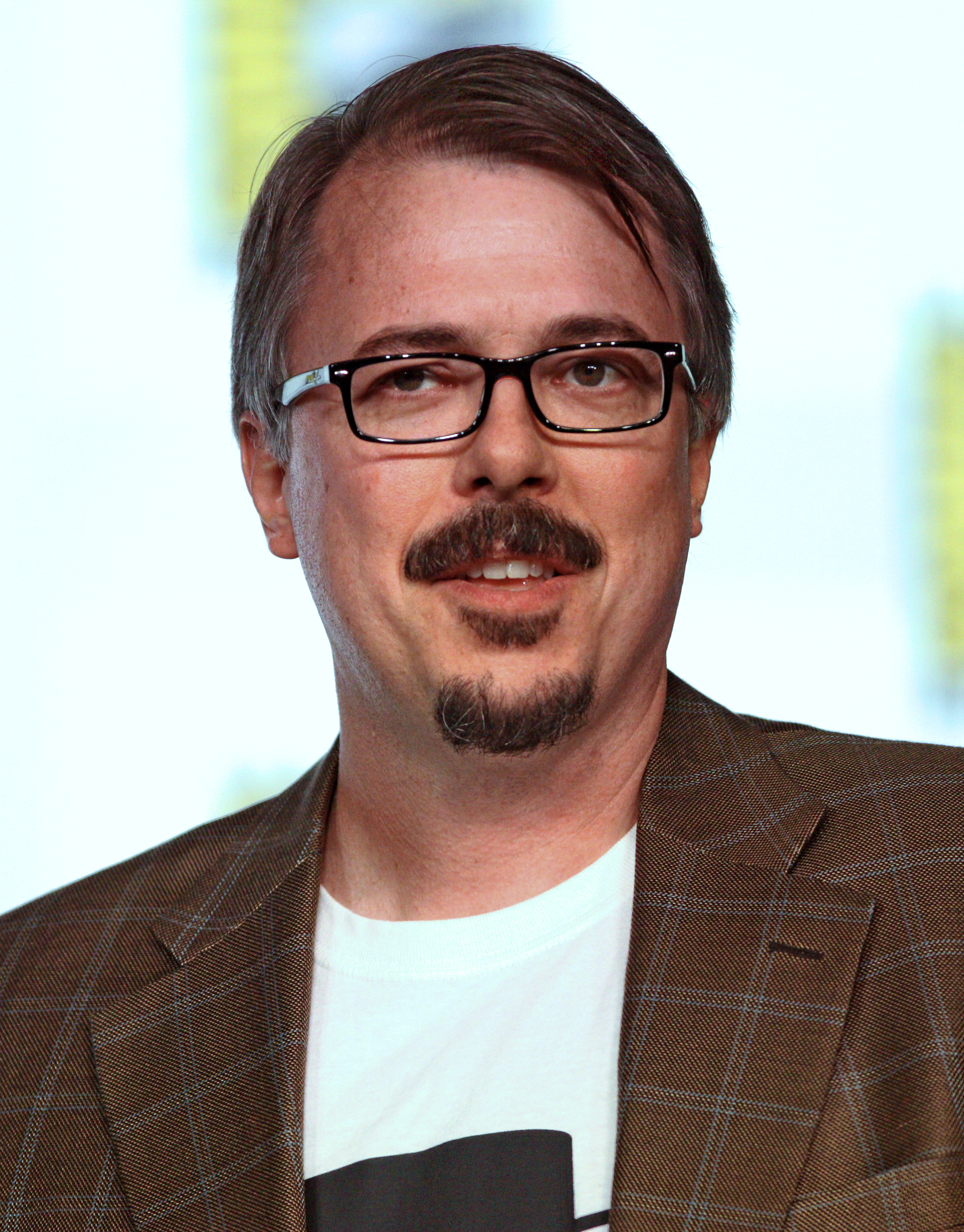
"Pusher", which was written by Vince Gilligan has been called one of the best episodes of the season.

Emily VanDerWerff of The A.V. Club called the third season The X-Files' "best season and maybe one of the greatest TV seasons of all time", noting it was consistent and "[swung] from strength to strength" between mythology and stand-alone episodes. However, she thought it "starts out kind of terribly" with "The Blessing Way". Zack Handlen, VanDerWerff's colleague, wrote that the third season was "one of the show's strongest, with the conspiracy arc still keeping tension high instead of just vamping for time. By this point, the sometimes awkward effects work of the early years is gone, and the overall direction is highly polished, giving even the season's weakest entries a cinematic feel". He stated that Morgan's "Clyde Bruckman's Final Repose" and "Jose Chung's From Outer Space" were "The X-Files's two greatest hours".

The writing credits provided by Morgan was widely cited as a highlight of the season. "War of the Coprophages" written by him received positive reviews, and Entertainment Weekly gave "War of the Coprophages" an A−, who praised the absurdity and entertainment value of the episode. Another episode, "Quagmire" containing some writing credits by Morgan received positive reviews, with the 10-minute dialogue sequence featuring Mulder and Scully receiving highly positive reviews.

Gilligan's episode "Pusher" was also cited as one of the best episodes of the series by both IGN and Den of Geek, and Tom Kessenich, in his book Examination: An Unauthorized Look at Seasons 6–9 of the X-Files, named the episode the third best episode of The X-Files and called it the "best MOTW ["monster-of-the-week"] in the series history" Duchovny considers his performance in "Oubliette" as his favorite of the season, an episode that received mostly positive reviews. Writing for DVD Talk, Earl Cressey rated the season overall four-and-a-half stars out of five, finding that the series' increased budget meant that its production values and the quality of its guest appearances were better than previous seasons.

=== Accolades ===
The third season earned the series eight Primetime Emmy Award nominations. It received its second consecutive nomination for Outstanding Drama Series, Gillian Anderson received her first nomination for Outstanding Lead Actress in a Drama Series, and the episode "Jose Chung's From Outer Space" was nominated for Outstanding Individual Achievement in Art Direction for a Series. The series won five awards, including Outstanding Individual Achievement in Writing for a Drama Series, for the episode "Clyde Bruckman's Final Repose" written by Darin Morgan. Peter Boyle won for Outstanding Guest Actor in a Drama Series for his performance in that same episode. The episode "Nisei" won for both Outstanding Individual Achievement in Sound Editing for a Series and Outstanding Individual Achievement in Sound Mixing for a Drama Series. John S. Bartley won for Outstanding Individual Achievement in Cinematography for a Series due to the episode "Grotesque". Duchovny and Anderson were each nominated for a Golden Globe Award for their performances.

== DVD release ==
The X-Files – The Complete Third Season
Set details		Special features
24 episodes; 7-disc set; 1.33:1 aspect ratio; Subtitles: English, Spanish; English (Dolby Digital 2.0 Surround)		"The Truth About Season Three" documentary; Chris Carter talks about 12 episodes: "The Blessing Way", "Paper Clip", "Clyde Bruckman's Final Repose", "Nisei", "731", "War of the Coprophages", "Piper Maru", "Apocrypha", "Pusher", "Jose Chung's From Outer Space", "Wetwired" and "Talitha Cumi"; Audio commentaries for "Aprocrypha" by Kim Manners and Chris Carter, and for ""Jose Chung's From Outer Space" by Rob Bowman and Darin Morgan; Selected special effects clips with commentary by Mat Beck; Deleted scenes with optional commentary by Chris Carter; 17 "Behind-the-truth" spots from F/X; TV promos for every episode; DVD-ROM game: "Unholy Alliances"
Release dates
Region 1	Region 2	Region 3
May 8, 2001	November 26, 2001	November 12, 2001

== Bibliography ==
- Edwards, Ted (1996). X-Files Confidential. Little, Brown and Company. ISBN 0-316-21808-1.
- Lovece, Frank (1996). The X-Files Declassified. Citadel Press. ISBN 0-8065-1745-X.
- Lowry, Brian (1995). The Truth is Out There: The Official Guide to the X-Files. Harper Prism. ISBN 0-06-105330-9.
- Lowry, Brian (1996). Trust No One: The Official Guide to the X-Files. Harper Prism. ISBN 0-06-105353-8.
- Kessenich, Tom (2002). Examination: An Unauthorized Look at Seasons 6–9 of the X-Files. Trafford Publishing. ISBN 978-1-55369-812-8.
- Shearman, Robert; Pearson, Lars (2009). Wanting to Believe: A Critical Guide to The X-Files, Millennium & The Lone Gunmen. Mad Norwegian Press. ISBN 978-0-9759446-9-1.
- Delasara, Jan (2000). PopLit, PopCult and The X-Files: A Critical Exploration. Mcfarland & Co. ISBN 0-7864-0789-1.
