= War of the Coprophages =

- The X-Files episode
- Episode no.: Season 3 Episode 12
- Directed by: Kim Manners
- Written by: Darin Morgan
- Production code: 3X12
- Original air date: January 5, 1996
- Running time: 44 minutes

Guest appearances
- Bobbie Phillips as Dr. Bambi Berenbaum; Raye Birk as Dr. Jeff Eckerle; Dion Anderson as Sheriff Frass; Bill Dow as Dr. Rick Newton; Alex Bruhanski as Dr. Bugger; Ken Kramer as Dr. Alexander Ivanov

Episode chronology
| ← Previous "Revelations" | Next → "Syzygy" |
- The X-Files season 3

"War of the Coprophages" is the twelfth episode of the third season of the science fiction television series The X-Files. It premiered on the Fox network on January 5, 1996. It was written by Darin Morgan, and directed by Kim Manners. The episode is a "Monster-of-the-Week" story, a stand-alone plot which is unconnected to the series' wider mythology. "War of the Coprophages" earned a Nielsen household rating of 10.1, being watched by 16.32 million people in its initial broadcast. The episode received mostly positive reviews from critics, who praised its humorous tone.

The show centers on FBI special agents Fox Mulder (David Duchovny) and Dana Scully (Gillian Anderson) who work on cases linked to the paranormal, called X-Files. In this episode, Mulder investigates a small town plagued by deaths in which the bodies are found covered in cockroaches. Working from home, Scully has scientific explanations for all of them, but Mulder—at the crime scene with an attractive bug expert—suspects the insects may not be organic, or earthly.

"War of the Coprophages" was Darin Morgan's third episode, after the second-season episode "Humbug" and season three's "Clyde Bruckman's Final Repose". In order to achieve the effect of a cockroach infestation, the show used around three hundred cockroaches for the episode in addition to extremely detailed rubber cockroach props and "piles and piles" of faux-dung. The episode's title is a reference to the famous novel The War of the Worlds by H.G. Wells, as well as its 1938 radio adaptation by Orson Welles. The character Dr. Berenbaum is named for entomologist May Berenbaum.

== Plot ==
In Miller's Grove, Massachusetts, an exterminator inspects the basement of Dr. Jeff Eckerle, having been hired to eradicate a cockroach infestation. As the exterminator attempts to crush a roach underfoot, he collapses from anaphylaxis while the roach crawls out from under his boot, unscathed. When Eckerle returns, he finds the exterminator's body covered with roaches. Fox Mulder (David Duchovny) is coincidentally nearby, investigating reported UFO sightings in Miller's Grove. While on the phone with Dana Scully (Gillian Anderson), he is approached by the local sheriff, Frass, who reveals that a series of "roach attacks" have taken place in the town. Frass allows Mulder onto the scene at Eckerle's residence.

Elsewhere, a trio of teenagers huff fumes generated from heated manure. One of them sees a roach crawl into an open wound on his wrist. In an attempt to extricate the insect, he begins to frantically slice his skin with a razor, leading him to sever an artery and bleed to death. At the scene, Mulder talks over the phone with Scully, who explains that it is likely a case of drug-induced delusional parasitosis, though Mulder finds a roach on the underside of a piece of furniture, indicating that roaches were at least present. When he attempts to capture the roach for analysis, it crumbles in his hand and the sharp pieces cut his fingers in the process, leading him to believe that the brittle casing was made of metal.

Frass purports that the government, under the guise of the USDA, has been breeding killer roaches in a nearby facility. Immediately afterwards, the medical examiner is found dead in a bathroom stall, initially covered with roaches that disappear from the scene before more than one person can witness them. Scully attributes the medical examiner's death to a cerebral aneurysm induced by overstraining while defecating. Mulder and Frass find a seemingly dead roach on a sink in the bathroom, and Mulder again attempts to capture it, but it proves to be alive and escapes down the drain.

Mulder investigates the facility Frass mentioned. Before breaking in, he and Scully discuss the odd behavior of the roaches, with Scully hypothesizing that they could be an invasive species. Inside the facility, which resembles a typical house, Mulder sees the walls rippling and is quickly surrounded by roaches. He is then confronted by Dr. Bambi Berenbaum (Bobbie Phillips), a researcher from the USDA who is studying roaches to develop more effective methods of pest control. Berenbaum has great interest in insects and, incidentally, believes that some UFOs are actually insect swarms flying through electrically charged airspaces. Yet another death occurs in Mulder's hotel, with the individual being found covered in roaches that quickly flee. At this point, Mulder believes that the individual simply died of fright, though Scully begins to wonder what is going on and decides to visit Miller's Grove herself.

Mulder brings a roach from the hotel room to Berenbaum, who thinks it may be mechanical. He then visits Dr. Ivanov, a wheelchair-using scientist who works on insect-like robots. The two discuss the possibility that extraterrestrial intelligences could send robotic probes to study other planets. After inspecting Mulder's specimen, Ivanov is rendered speechless; he informs Mulder that the specimen is, technology-wise, vastly superior to anything he's ever seen. Scully arrives in the town at a convenience store, finding the residents succumbing to mass hysteria over the roaches. She attempts to calm the people down, but they instead frantically flee after two scuffling patrons knock over a display of chocolate candies, believing them to be more roaches.

Mulder catches another roach to bring to Berenbaum, but this time she concludes that it is a seemingly normal insect. Scully finds out that Eckerle was researching dung-derived methane as an alternative fuel source, and had been importing animal dung that may have introduced the roaches to the area. Upon hearing this, Mulder speculates that the roaches are actually extraterrestrial robotic probes that are capable of consuming dung—an abundant resource already exploited by some species of roaches—to generate methane as a source of fuel.

Mulder goes with Berenbaum to see Eckerle at his facility. She stays in the car while he goes inside, finding Eckerle in a deeply paranoid state. Eckerle pulls a gun on Mulder, thinking that even he may somehow be a cockroach. Scully arrives on the scene and meets Berenbaum. She then goes in the facility looking for Mulder and then phones him; when his phone rings, Eckerle believes it to be Mulder making a tone like the rest of the unusual roaches. He fires at Mulder, and his shots rupture and ignite pipes containing methane gas. The agents flee, and the facility explodes with Eckerle still inside. The next day, Ivanov arrives at the scene to talk with Mulder and meets Berenbaum. The two leave with one another, discussing their interests in insects and robots. That night Mulder writes his report on the case, wondering how humanity would react if insect-like robots visited Earth. Mulder finds a Blaberus giganteus by his food and crushes it with an X-File.

== Production ==
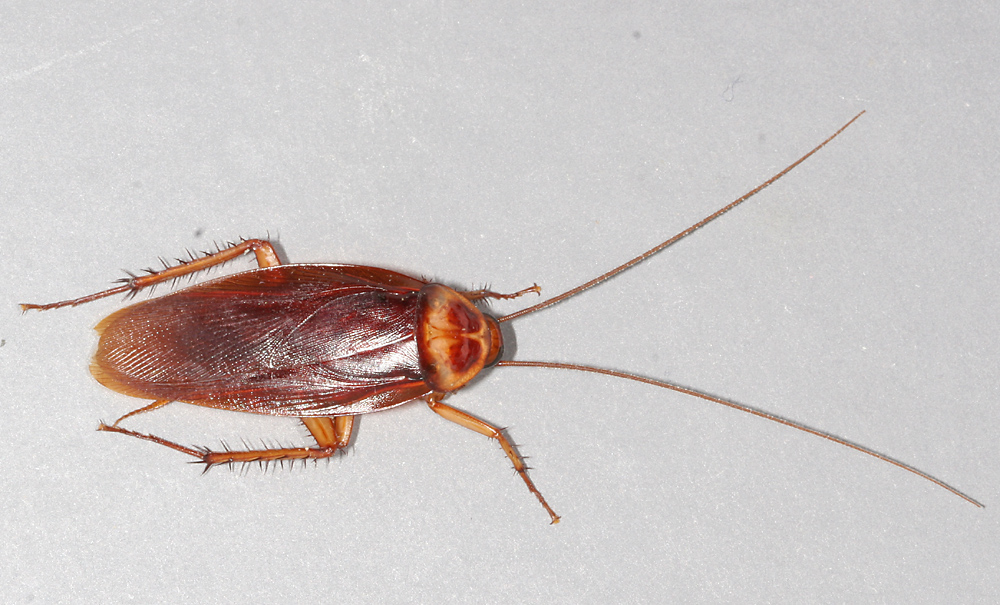
Debbie Cove, the animal trainer for The X-Files, used around three hundred cockroaches for this episode, only one of which died during production (due to old age).

Writer Darin Morgan was inspired to write the episode after he saw the cover of a magazine that featured insect-like robots designed by roboticist and author Rodney Brooks. Morgan was also inspired by Orson Welles's 1938 radio broadcast of H.G. Wells's book The War of the Worlds (which had caused mass hysteria), with the episode's title being a direct reference to the novel (with the last part of the episode's title, "coprophages", referring to a dung eater). The town featured in this episode also takes place in—Miller's Grove—is a play on Grover's Mill, the setting of Orson Welles's 1938 radio adaptation. Originally, a scene featuring the sheriff discussing a noted case of hysteria from the 1930s was planned to be included in the final episode, but was cut due to time. The episode, like Morgan's previous effort, the second season's "Humbug", used a great deal of humor, including an in-joke where Scully reads Breakfast at Tiffany's, referencing a question on Jeopardy! that had been asked when David Duchovny appeared on the show.

The show's animal trainer, Debbie Cove, used around three hundred cockroaches for the production of this episode, and of these hundreds, only one died during the filming, although it was due to old age. Director Kim Manners was very pleased with the way the cockroaches 'acted', noting that "every shot I wanted to get, they got." (Cast and crew members humorously recalled that Manners even began giving orders to the insects, with cinematographer John Bartley saying, "when I saw Kim Manners talking to a bucket of cockroaches, that was a highlight for me.") Several "incredibly detailed" rubber cockroaches were also created for the episode to supplement the live insects. These props were designed by prop master Ken Hawryliw and "could [be] put ... next to a real roach and no one would know the difference." "Piles and piles" of faux-dung were also created for the show by using an organic, feces-free substance.

The episode came under heavy criticism by the standards and practices department at parent network Fox, who took exception to the initial script's heavy use of words such as "crap" to refer to the excrement that episode's cockroaches fed upon. Darin Morgan later attacked and parodied this approach in the twenty-first episode of the second season of the American crime-thriller television series Millennium called "Somehow, Satan Got Behind Me". In the episode, a network censor again targets the use of the word "crap" and storms onto the set of a show resembling The X-Files being taped, featuring lookalikes of Mulder and Scully.

The episode marks a rare occasion in the series in which the fourth wall is broken: Although no character addresses the audience, a cockroach scurries across the screen, scaring the viewer into thinking that an actual insect is crawling on their television.

== Reception ==
"War of the Coprophages" premiered on the Fox network on January 5, 1996. This episode earned a Nielsen rating of 10.1, with a 16 share, meaning that roughly 10.1 percent of all television-equipped households, and 16 percent of households watching television, were tuned in to the episode. It was viewed by 16.32 million viewers.

The episode received positive reviews from critics. Entertainment Weekly gave "War of the Coprophages" an A−, and wrote, "Irreverent camp that's infested with laughs (and creepy-crawlies) but throws credibility out the window." Reviewer Zack Handlen of The A.V. Club gave the episode an A and compared it to the previously Morgan-penned "Clyde Bruckman's Final Repose", writing, "So! This is the second Darin Morgan episode I've had to write about, and once again, I'm not sure I've done it justice. [...] The comedy here can be broad, but there's always enough self-aware commentary buried in it that it never becomes simplistic. While "Bruckman" dealt with the misery of knowing all the answers, "Coprophages" looks at how easy it is to convince yourself you know what's going on, even when you don't. It'd be better to believe in a bunch of bugs from outer space coming down to earth to mess with our minds, than it would be to accept the more likely truth that bugs like shit—and around here, there's always plenty to go around." Critical Myth's John Keegan gave the episode an 8/10 and praised the episode's self-parodying style, saying, "Overall, this episode was a rare self-contained parody, well written by Darin Morgan. By standing on its own outside of continuity, the episode gives itself plenty of room to send-up the series premise and its early internet fandom. There’s no real sense of resolution, but that’s really incidental to the point of the parody." Author Phil Farrand rated the episode as his second favorite episode of the first four seasons in his book The Nitpickers Guide to the X-Files.

The cast and the crew of the show enjoyed the episode, for the most part. Co-producer Paul Rabwin said that the episode had some of the funniest material in The X-Files as well as some of the most horrific, such as the scene where a cockroach crawled into someone's arm. Gillian Anderson rated the episode one of her favorite episodes of the third season. On a more negative note, writer Darin Morgan ended up being unhappy with the final product, saying "The other day, my girlfriend was saying, 'I never understood that episode,' and I guess I don't either. It was an episode that had a lot of what I thought were really good ideas and never quite got it to work. I was really disappointed with that episode. Some people love it." The plot for "War of the Coprophages" was also adapted as a novel for young adults in 1997 by Les Martin, under the title Die, Bug, Die!

== Bibliography ==
- Edwards, Ted (1996). X-Files Confidential. Little, Brown and Company. ISBN 0-316-21808-1.
- Farrand, Phil (1998). The Nitpickers Guide to the X-Files. Doubleday Direct. ISBN 1-56865-503-7.
- Hurwitz, Matt; Knowles, Chris (2008). The Complete X-Files. Insight Editions. ISBN 978-1-933784-80-9.
- Lowry, Brian (1996). Trust No One: The Official Guide to the X-Files. Harper Prism. ISBN 0-06-105353-8.
- Shearman, Robert (2009). Wanting to Believe: A Critical Guide to The X-Files, Millennium & The Lone Gunmen. Mad Norwegian Press. ISBN 978-0-9759446-9-1.
