= Talitha Cumi (The X-Files) =

- The X-Files episode
- Episode no.: Season 3 Episode 24
- Directed by: R. W. Goodwin
- Story by: David Duchovny; Chris Carter
- Teleplay by: Chris Carter
- Production code: 3X24
- Original air date: May 17, 1996
- Running time: 44 minutes

Guest appearances
- Mitch Pileggi as Walter Skinner; William B. Davis as The Smoking Man; Steven Williams as X; Roy Thinnes as Jeremiah Smith; Brian Thompson as The Bounty Hunter; Rebecca Toolan as Teena Mulder; Jerry Hardin as Deep Throat; Peter Donat as William Mulder; Stephen Dimopoulos as Detective; Hrothgar Mathews as Galen Muntz; John MacLaren as Dr. Laberge; Angelo Vacco as Door Man; Cam Cronin as Paramedic; Bonnie Hay as Night Nurse

Episode chronology
← Previous "Wetwired"	Next → "Herrenvolk"
- The X-Files season 3

"Talitha Cumi" is the twenty-fourth episode and the season finale of the third season of the science fiction television series The X-Files. It premiered on the Fox network on May 17, 1996, in the United States. The teleplay was written by series creator Chris Carter, based on a story he developed with lead actor David Duchovny, and was directed by R. W. Goodwin. The episode is one of several that explored the series' overarching mythology. "Talitha Cumi" achieved a Nielsen household rating of 11.2, being watched by 17.86 million people in its initial broadcast. The episode received mostly positive reviews from critics.

The show centers on FBI special agents Fox Mulder (David Duchovny) and Dana Scully (Gillian Anderson) who work on cases linked to the paranormal, called X-Files. In this episode, Mulder and Scully search for a man who seems to possess strange powers, who may have information about Mulder's family and the Syndicate. "Talitha Cumi" is the first part of a two-part episode, initiating the plot that is finalized in the fourth-season premiere, "Herrenvolk".

The basic premise of "Talitha Cumi", most notably the scene featuring Jeremiah Smith's interrogation by The Smoking Man (William B. Davis), was heavily influenced by "The Grand Inquisitor"—a chapter in Fyodor Dostoyevsky's novel The Brothers Karamazov—on the suggestion of Duchovny. The title "Talitha Cumi" is Aramaic for "Little girl, get up," and alludes to the biblical story of the raising of Jairus' daughter.

== Plot ==
At a fast food restaurant in Arlington, Virginia, a man draws a gun and shoots three people before he is shot by police snipers outside. An older man revives the gunman and his victims by touching them with the palms of his hands.

Fox Mulder (David Duchovny) and Dana Scully (Gillian Anderson) arrive to investigate. They interview the victims and gunman, finding that the mysterious healer, Jeremiah Smith (Roy Thinnes), disappeared while being interviewed by a detective. Meanwhile, The Smoking Man (William B. Davis) meets with Mulder's mother Teena (Rebecca Toolan), and the two argue as someone photographs them from a distance. Later, Assistant Director Walter Skinner (Mitch Pileggi) notifies Mulder that Teena has suffered a stroke. At the hospital, Teena writes the word "PALM" on a notepad, which Mulder takes to mean her stroke is connected to Jeremiah Smith.

Mulder finds footage of Smith being interviewed and sees that someone else appears in Smith's place when the detective looks away. Meanwhile, Smith is at his place of work at the Social Security Administration when he is captured by the Smoking Man and taken to a high-security prison. Mulder heads to his mother's home and encounters X (Steven Williams), who shows him his photos of Teena and the Smoking Man. Mulder searches the house and realizes that "PALM" was Teena's attempt to write "LAMP". He then finds an alien stiletto weapon inside one of the lamps—the same kind used by the Alien Bounty Hunter.

At FBI headquarters, Scully meets a man who appears to be Smith, who has come to turn himself in. During an interview with Scully and Skinner, he claims to have no memory of the shooting or of healing anyone. Meanwhile, the Smoking Man interrogates the real Smith, who has lost faith in the Syndicate's project. He shapeshifts into Deep Throat (Jerry Hardin) and Bill Mulder (Peter Donat) to unnerve his captor. Finally, Smith reveals that the Smoking Man is dying of lung cancer.

Mulder blames the Smoking Man for his mother's condition. When he learns about the statement given by "Smith", Mulder goes to his workplace to bring him in for questioning. "Smith" initially complies but flees into a crowd, shapeshifting into someone else. The impostor—a Bounty Hunter—arrives at Smith's cell to kill him, finding it empty. Mulder visits Teena at the hospital but encounters the Smoking Man and threatens him with a gun. The Smoking Man says that Teena met with him about the whereabouts of his sister, Samantha. In the parking garage, Mulder is confronted by X, who demands the alien stiletto. When Mulder refuses to hand it over, the two grapple to a stalemate.

Scully finds other identical "Jeremiah Smiths" working at Social Security offices across the country. She is later met by Smith, who reveals she had met an imposter. Smith promises more information, and he and Scully meet Mulder at an abandoned site. Mulder wants to take Smith to see his mother, but the Bounty Hunter arrives seconds later.

== Production ==
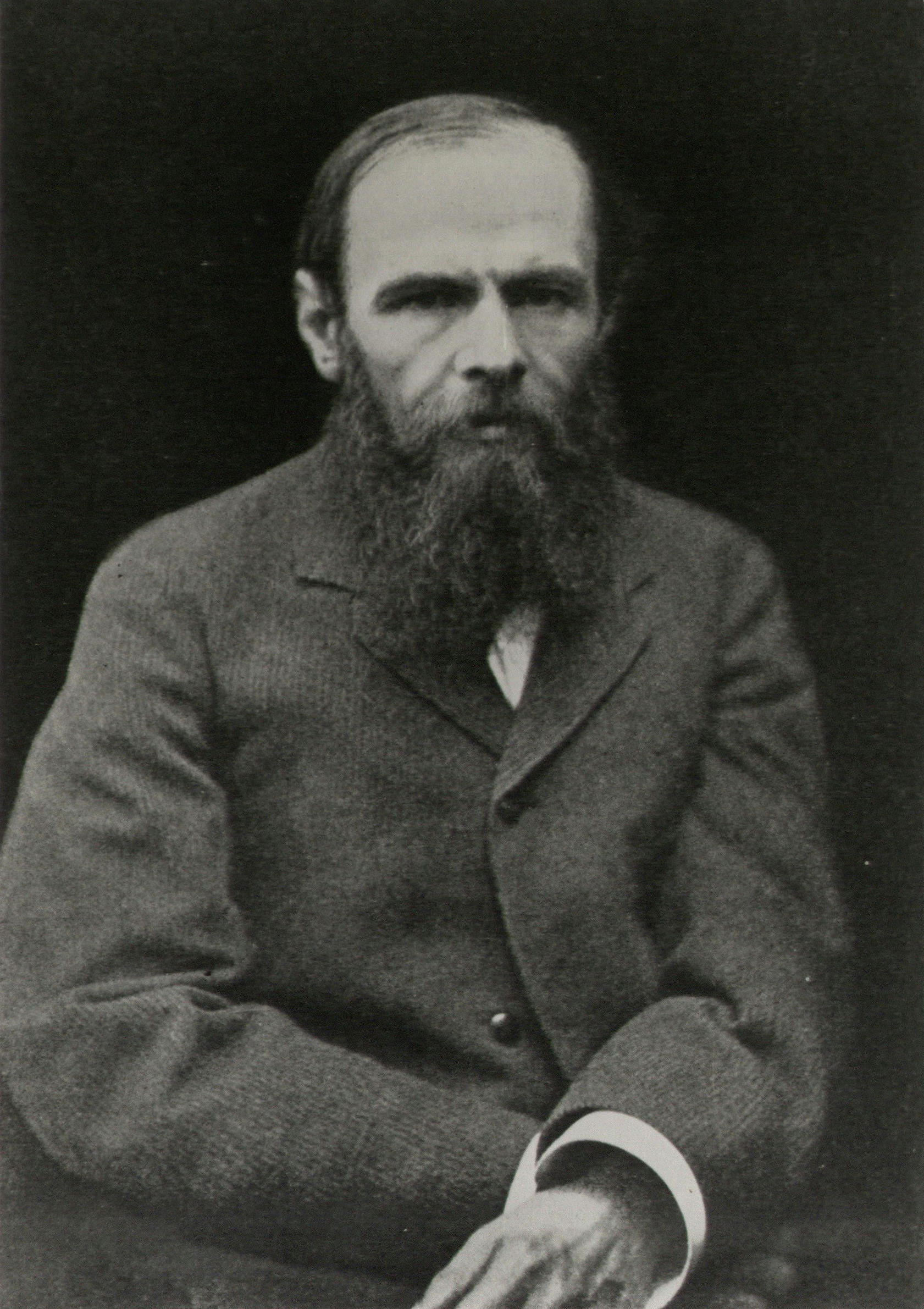
Dostoyevsky's novel The Brothers Karamazov influenced the episode's writing.

=== Conception and writing ===
This episode, per David Duchovny's suggestions, was heavily influenced by "The Grand Inquisitor", a chapter in Fyodor Dostoyevsky's novel The Brothers Karamazov. This was particularly evident in the scenes in the prison between The Smoking Man and Jeremiah Smith. In addition, this reference is woven into the story, in Smith healing the shooter and the shooting victims in the episode's teaser, in the title of the restaurant—"The Brothers K"—and the episode's title, originally from Mark 5:41, in which Jesus heals the daughter of Jairus and quotes the Aramaic phrase meaning, "Little girl, get up!" but which also figures in The Brothers Karamazov. These references were originally suggested by David Duchovny for the episodes "Colony" and "End Game" but never made their way into those episodes and were used here.

As Carter was writing "Talitha Cumi," he decided that the episode's main theme would be loyalty. It was decided that the commitment Mulder felt towards the X-Files would be tested by seeing if he would be willing to sacrifice those he cared about, most notably his mother, Scully, and the quest to find his sister, Samantha. In addition, the Smoking Man's allegiances are in that he must decide whether or not to heal himself of cancer using the power of Jeremiah Smith. Ultimately, Mulder's loyalties prove altruistic, whereas the Smoking Man chooses self-interest over The Syndicate's cause.

=== Casting ===
Hrothgar Mathews was chosen as the suicidal gunman out of several actors, one of whom had even brought a fake gun to his audition. During his audition, he tried out the test reading several ways, including a style that had a "messianic quality". Mathews was chosen for the role and told by Chris Carter that, despite his character's life-changing event, he was "still a lunatic".

Roy Thinnes, who portrayed the alien healer Jeremiah Smith, was suggested to Chris Carter by David Duchovny, after the latter had met Thinnes on an airplane flight. (Note: Thinnes recalls his introduction to Carter differently: "The way I got to know him is that I got his private number ... I have this article that Chris Carter did an interview and he didn't say he was influenced by The Invaders but that he would like to have Roy Thinnes on the show, and six months later I thought I'd call him ...") Carter had seen Thinnes' television work and had been a fan of the 1967–68 television series The Invaders. Early on in pre-production, the writers decided to have Smith morph into various characters that the Smoking Man had, either personally or involuntarily, killed, including Deep Throat, Bill Mulder, and Melissa Scully. Melinda McGraw, who portrayed Melissa Scully during the second season, was unavailable for filming, so her scene was cut. In addition, a photo-double was brought in for Jerry Hardin, who played Deep Throat, because he was unavailable on one of the filming days. Frank Spotnitz later called the prison sequence the scene with "the biggest cast ever."

Gillian Anderson's stand-in, Bonnie Hay, was cast as the main hospital nurse, marking her fifth appearance as a character in the show. She had previously portrayed a nurse in the earlier third-season episode "D.P.O." and the two-part second season episodes "Colony" and "End Game."

=== Filming and post-production ===
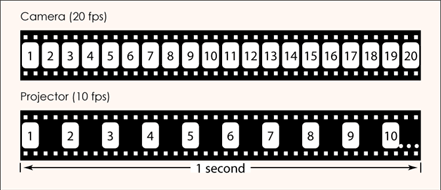
The opening scene made use of overcranking (frame rates illustrated) to achieve a slow motion effect.

The fight between Mulder and X was heavily edited by Fox's broadcast standards department. Despite the fact that most of the action was done by stunt doubles, Steven Williams was injured during the filming of the fight scene. The opening scene with the restaurant shooting was filmed mostly on two handheld cameras, with director R. W. Goodwin using a variety of short shots and rapid cuts to different perspectives. This was done to create a chaotic scene which would contrast with how the character of Thinnes' character Jeremiah Smith was presented—shots focused on him were filmed using a Steadicam to allow the character to seem "rock steady". The film used was also overcranked, where the frame rate of the recording is much higher than that which will be played back, slowing down the footage when it is played at a normal frame rate. This gave a slow motion effect to Thinnes' movements, in order to aid the "Godlike" impression Goodwin wanted.

The "Grand Inquisitor" scene between Jeremiah Smith and The Smoking Man involved several instances of morphing from one character to another. The morph involving Smith assuming the guise of Peter Donat's character Bill Mulder was simply achieved by using static cameras, allowing Thinnes to leave the set and Donat to take his place, with the morphing effect bridging the change in actors. However, Jerry Hardin, who was involved in another morph to his character Deep Throat, was unavailable on the day this was shot, as he was filming for a movie elsewhere. The sections of the morph involving Thinnes were recorded, and the set was reconstructed later when Hardin was available, with the actors matched up based on footage and photography to recreate the same positions, which producer Paul Rabwin has described as "backwards" and "very difficult".

== Broadcast and reception ==
There's always something vaguely Freudian about conspiracy theories, isn't there? Powerful figures with impenetrable motives controlling the lives of the innocent--well, from a certain skewed angle, that's pretty much what parents do. Believing in conspiracy is believing that there's someone out there, somewhere, who can make everything make sense. And of course you have to stop them, because you want to make your own kind of sense.

— The A.V. Club's Zack Handlen

"Talitha Cumi" premiered on the Fox network on May 17, 1996. The episode earned a Nielsen household rating of 11.2 with a 21 share, meaning that roughly 11.2 percent of all television-equipped households, and 21 percent of households watching television, were tuned in to the episode. A total of 17.86 million viewers watched this episode during its original airing.

In an overview of the third season in Entertainment Weekly, "Talitha Cumi" was rated an "A−". The review called the episode a "frustratingly provocative cliff-hanger", calling the interrogation scene of Jeremiah Smith "a tour de force". Chris Carter has also noted that the interrogation 'is really a summation of my feelings about science ... that it has definitely usurped religion and can explain everything now". Writing for The A.V. Club, Zack Handlen rated the episode an "A", praising its cliffhanger ending and "good storytelling". Handlen felt that the episode dealt with themes familiar to the series, but in a manner which did not appear repetitive; and again noted Jeremiah Smith's confrontation with The Smoking Man as a highlight.

== Bibliography ==
- Edwards, Ted (1996). X-Files Confidential. Little, Brown and Company. ISBN 0-316-21808-1.
- Lovece, Frank (1996). The X-Files Declassified. Citadel press. ISBN 0-8065-1745-X.
- Lowry, Brian (1996). Trust No One: The Official Guide to the X-Files. Harper Prism. ISBN 0-06-105353-8.
