= Hell Money =

- The X-Files episode
- A frog bursts out of a cadaver's chest. The scene was created by using molds to create a fake human torso that was then placed over an actor.
- Episode no.: Season 3 Episode 19
- Directed by: Tucker Gates
- Written by: Jeff Vlaming
- Production code: 3X19
- Original air date: March 29, 1996
- Running time: 44 minutes

Guest appearances
- BD Wong as Detective Glen Chao; Lucy Liu as Kim Hsin; Michael Yama as Mr. Hsin; James Hong as Hard Faced Man; Doug Abrahams as Detective Neary; Ellie Harvie as OPO Staffer; Derek Lowe as Johnny Lo; Donald Fong as Vase Man; Diana Ha as Dr. Wu; Stephen M.D. Chang as Large Man; Paul Wong as Wiry Man

Episode chronology
← Previous "Teso Dos Bichos"	Next → "Jose Chung's From Outer Space"
- The X-Files season 3

"Hell Money" is the nineteenth episode of the third season of the science fiction television series The X-Files and 68th episode overall. It premiered on the Fox network in the United States on March 29, 1996. It was written by Jeffrey Vlaming and directed by Tucker Gates, and featured guest appearances by BD Wong, Lucy Liu, Michael Yama, and James Hong. The episode is a "Monster-of-the-Week" story, unconnected to the series' wider mythology. "Hell Money" earned a Nielsen household rating of 9.9, being watched by 14.86 million people in its initial broadcast. The episode received mostly mixed to positive reviews from television critics.

The show centers on FBI special agents Fox Mulder (David Duchovny) and Dana Scully (Gillian Anderson), who work on cases linked to the paranormal, called X-Files. In this episode, Mulder and Scully investigate a murder in San Francisco's Chinatown involving masked intruders, strange Chinese symbols, a lottery, and the clandestine selling of body parts.

The premise of the episode was based on three major ideas: a pyramid scheme involving body parts, a lottery in a small town, and corporate beings assembling the destitute in Chinatown. The episode's writer, Vlaming, developed the latter two ideas and series creator Chris Carter merged all three ideas in the finalized script. The episode contained several elaborate special effects shots, most notably the scene wherein a frog bursts out of a victim's chest, which was created by using molds to create a fake human torso that was then placed over an actor.

== Plot ==
In San Francisco's Chinatown, a Chinese immigrant, Johnny Lo, makes his way to his apartment. There, he is confronted by someone telling him to "pay the price", and is overtaken by three figures wearing shigong masks. A security guard later finds the three figures near a crematory oven, in which Lo is being burned alive.

Fox Mulder and Dana Scully investigate Lo's death, the latest in a series of fatal incinerations in Chinatown; Mulder believes that ghost activity is behind the deaths, while Scully suspects a cult. The agents collaborate with Glen Chao (BD Wong), a Chinese-American detective with the SFPD. When they find a Chinese character written inside the oven, Chao translates it as meaning "ghost." Mulder also finds a scrap of burned paper in the ashes, which Chao identifies as "hell money", a symbolic offering to deceased spirits. The agents locate Lo's apartment, where they find his collection of charms, as well as bloodstains underneath the recently installed carpet.

Meanwhile, another immigrant, Hsin, tends to his leukemia-stricken daughter, Kim (Lucy Liu). To pay for her treatments, Hsin attends an underground lottery in which participants either win money or lose an organ, depending on tiles chosen from a pair of vases. One man wins the lottery but selects a bad tile, and his body is found later that day. Scully performs an autopsy and finds that he had been selling body parts, noticing his numerous surgical scars. The agents question Chao, who claims that the local community maintains a code of silence and does not reveal anything, even to him.

Chao finds information that leads them to Hsin, who installed the carpet in Lo's apartment. Hsin has a bandage over his eye, having lost it to the lottery earlier. Returning to his home, Chao is confronted by the three masked figures. Upon learning about the attack, the agents attempt to visit Chao at the hospital but find him missing. Meanwhile, Hsin is visited by the Hard Faced Man (James Hong), one of the proprietors of the lottery. Hsin tells the man that he wants to end his participation, to which the man replies that the rules cannot be broken and warns him that the ghostly fire will consume him if he leaves the lottery. The agents match the blood on the carpet in Lo's apartment with Chao. They try to visit Hsin, but find only his daughter at his apartment.

Hsin wins the lottery, but selects the tile representing his heart. Chao comes in and tries to persuade one of the lottery's organizers to let Hsin live but to no avail, causing Chao to knock over the table with the vases, which reveals the lottery to be fixed. Chao then storms in the room where the surgery on Hsin is about to be carried out and fires at the Hard Faced Man, after which the agents come in and arrest them all, including Chao for his involvement in the lottery. They interrogate the Hard Faced Man, but because no one who participated will testify against him, it is unlikely he will be prosecuted. Hsin is brought to the hospital and his daughter is placed on an organ donor list. Chao mysteriously disappears, awakening in a crematory oven before he is burned alive.

== Production ==
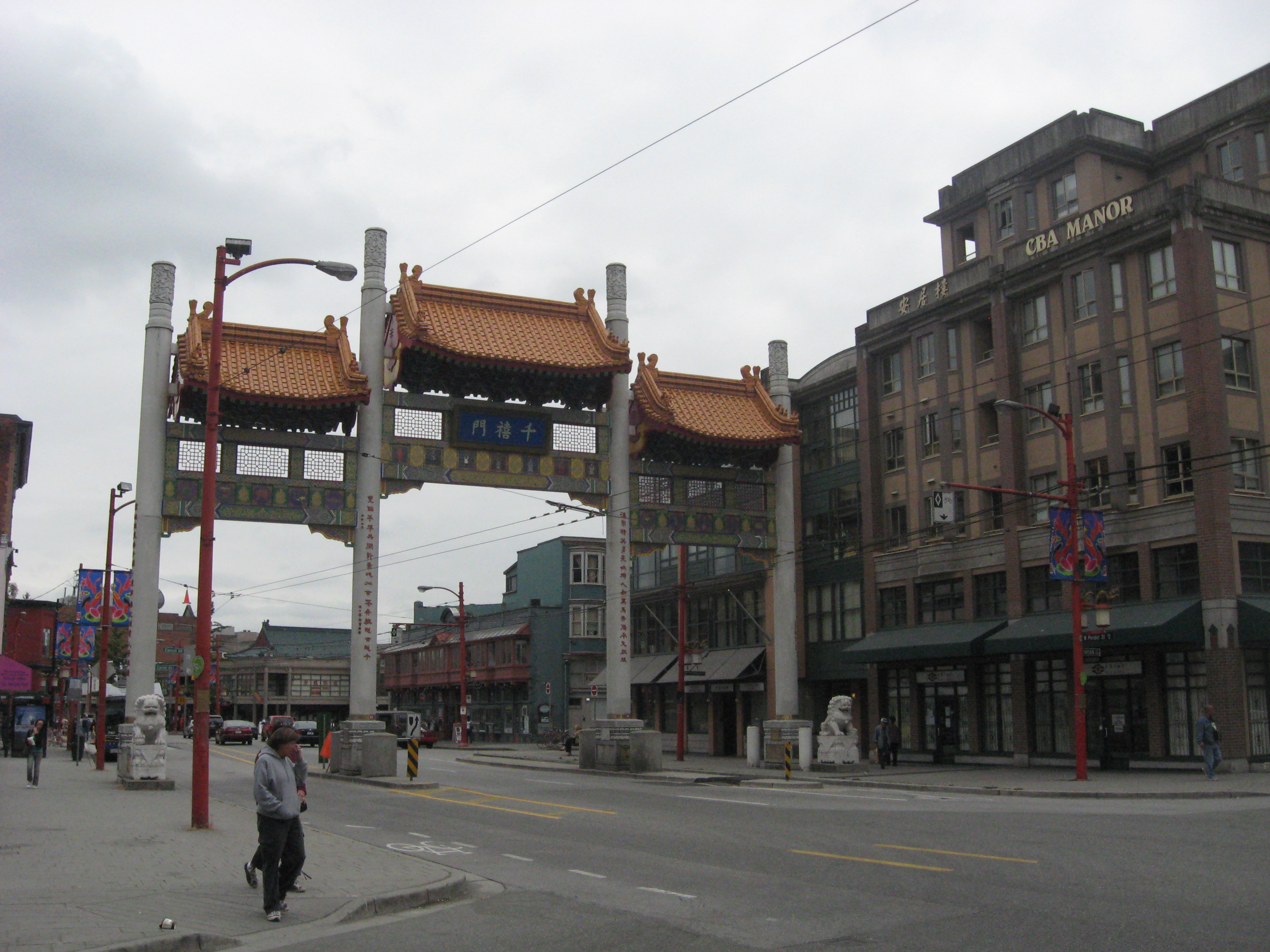
Exterior shots for the episode were filmed at Chinatown, in Vancouver.

=== Writing ===
"Hell Money" was written by Jeff Vlaming, his last script for the series. The episode was directed by Tucker Gates, making it the first of only two episodes of The X-Files—the other being the show's fourth season entry "El Mundo Gira"—that he directed. The episode features pre-fame Lucy Liu in a guest star role. Liu would later gain prominence as a cast member of the show Ally McBeal in 1998.

The premise of the episode evolved from an idea that series creator Chris Carter had about a "pyramid scheme for body parts". Writer Jeff Vlaming took this concept and combined it with two other ideas: The first involved "a lottery in a small town" and the other concerned a corporate entity controlling the poor in Chinatown. When the initial script for "Hell Money" was submitted, Carter streamlined the three stories into one. Entertainment Weekly later noted that "the twisted grotesquery of this story makes you think it must be based on a true story", but, according to Carter, the story was completely original. Vlaming had originally hoped that the episode would end with Scully being correct—a rare occurrence on the show. In the end, however, Mulder is the one to put it all together.

=== Filming ===
Exterior scenes for the episode were filmed in Chinatown, Vancouver, while the scenes taking place in a crematorium were shot on a soundstage. Interior shots of the gambling parlor were shot at the Welsh Irish Scottish English (W.I.S.E.) Hall, a community building in Vancouver. The production staff created a second balcony in the hall exclusively for the episode, with an agreement to tear it down once the episode was filmed. However, after the filming ended, the W.I.S.E. Hall's owners requested that the balcony be left in place "for aesthetic reasons". The vase and tiles used in the episode were created by the show's production department. The scene where a frog pops out of a victim's chest was created by using a live actor pretending to be a corpse, covered with a faux torso. For a close-up shot, the torso itself, which had a discrete access hole in it, was placed on the autopsy table, and an animal wrangler pushed a real frog up through the slit. After filming wrapped up, actors Michael Yama and Lucy Liu were asked to re-record their dialogue, this time affecting Cantonese dialects. Their lines were then added over the original footage in post-production.

== Reception ==
"Hell Money" premiered on the Fox network in the United States on March 29, 1996. This episode earned a Nielsen rating of 9.9, with a 17 share, meaning that roughly 9.9 percent of all television-equipped households, and 17 percent of households watching television, were tuned in to the episode. This totaled 14.86 million viewers.

The episode received mixed to positive reviews from critics, ranging from largely positive to negative. Entertainment Weekly gave the episode an A−, calling it "gorgeously shot", citing the "lush, smoky gaming sequences" in particular. Television Without Pity ranked "Hell Money" the eleventh most nightmare-inducing episode of the show noting, "If there's one thing you don't want to mess with, it's the Chinese mafia. Especially the branch that dresses up like Slipknot and either a) burns you alive, if you're lucky, or b) forces you to participate in a haunted organ-harvesting raffle only to slowly carve you up and sell your vital organs on the black market, whether you like it or not." Robert Shearman, in his book Wanting to Believe: A Critical Guide to The X-Files, Millennium & The Lone Gunmen, rated the episode four stars out of five, and called it a "hard episode to love [but] sincere and purposeful". The author praised the conceit of the episode, arguing that by presenting the situation from the Chinese immigrants—members of an alien culture—and Chao's point of view, "Mulder and Scully seem clumsy and arrogant. And by implication, the audience are made to feel just as arrogant."

Other reviews were more mixed. John Keegan from Critical Myth gave the episode 5/10, noting "Overall, this episode attempted to make a mundane murder case interesting by forcing the agents to interact with an 'alien' culture. Unfortunately, the structure of the episode gave the audience answers long before the agents discovered them, making the bulk of the episode an exercise. By not taking the theme far enough or deepening the mystery, the writers ultimately fail to reach their goals." Reviewer Emily St. James from The A.V. Club gave the entry a C+ and wrote that the episode "was also fairly bold for its time, providing a whole subplot that's mostly told through subtitles [but] it feels like a series of shocks that are strung together along a pretty standard story setup." Ultimately, St. James concluded that, "the major problem with 'Hell Money' is that it feels, at times, like a backdoor pilot for a new series starring B.D. Wong as corrupt detective Glen Chao." Paula Vitaris from Cinefantastique gave the episode a mixed review and awarded it two stars out of four. She critiqued the fact that the episode lacked a paranormal mystery, noting that the theme of the episode "would fit nicely into any other police drama". Vitaris described the "three actors in the black suits and ghost masks" as "not very convincing."

Co-producer Paul Rabwin was not a fan of "Hell Money": he believed that the premise was not really an X-File due to the fact that nothing paranormal happened during the episode. He claimed that if Mulder and Scully were removed from the story, it would not have changed anything and that the two were not affected personally by the case.

== Bibliography ==
- Edwards, Ted (1996). X-Files Confidential. Little, Brown and Company. ISBN 0-316-21808-1.
- Gradnitzer, Louisa; Pittson, Todd (1999). X Marks the Spot: On Location with The X-Files. Arsenal Pulp Press. ISBN 1-55152-066-4.
- Hurwitz, Matt; Knowles, Chris (2008). The Complete X-Files. Insight Editions. ISBN 978-1933784809.
- Lowry, Brian (1996). Trust No One: The Official Guide to the X-Files. Harper Prism. ISBN 0061053538.
- Shearman, Robert (2009). Wanting to Believe: A Critical Guide to The X-Files, Millennium & The Lone Gunmen. Mad Norwegian Press. ISBN 978-0-9759446-9-1.
