= D.P.O. (The X-Files) =

- The X-Files episode
- Darin Peter Oswald summoning lightning.
- Episode no.: Season 3 Episode 3
- Directed by: Kim Manners
- Written by: Howard Gordon
- Production code: 3X03
- Original air date: October 6, 1995
- Running time: 44 minutes

Guest appearances
- Giovanni Ribisi as Darin Peter Oswald; Jack Black as Bart "Zero" Liquori; Ernie Lively as Sheriff Teller; Karen Witter as Sharon Kiveat; Steve Makaj as Frank Kiveat

Episode chronology
← Previous "Paper Clip"	Next → "Clyde Bruckman's Final Repose"
- The X-Files season 3

"D.P.O." is the third episode of the third season of television series The X-Files. The episode first aired in the United States on October 6, 1995, on Fox, being written by Howard Gordon and directed by Kim Manners. The episode is a stand-alone episode, like most episodes of The X-Files, and follows the normal Monster-of-the-Week pattern of the show. "D.P.O." earned a Nielsen household rating of 10.9, being watched by 15.57 million people in its initial broadcast, and received positive reviews.

The show centers on FBI special agents Fox Mulder (David Duchovny) and Dana Scully (Gillian Anderson) who work on cases linked to the paranormal, called X-Files. In this episode, Mulder and Scully investigate a series of lightning-related deaths in Oklahoma, which are eventually connected to the only person, an emotionally charged youth, to have survived a series of lightning strikes that killed five other local men.

The original concept for the episode was a one line concept card stating "Lightning Boy" that had been tacked to a board in series creator Chris Carter's office since the first season. The episode contained several scenes of elaborate lightning effects. Notably, a "lightning machine", used for the sequence where Darin is struck by lightning, was created by Special Effects Supervisor David Gauthier and buried under the ground.

== Plot ==
At a video arcade in Connerville, Oklahoma, two young men, Jack Hammond and Darin Peter Oswald, argue over a game of Virtua Fighter 2. Hammond pushes Oswald to the ground, after which the power in the arcade mysteriously shuts down—except for a jukebox which plays "Ring the Bells" by James. This causes Hammond to leave, but when he goes outside to start his car, he finds the same song playing on the radio. He is then fatally electrocuted through the ignition. Oswald, who witnesses Hammond's death, returns to the game.

Hammond is the latest of five local men who have died due to lightning-related causes, causing Fox Mulder and Dana Scully to investigate. Scully talks to Bart "Zero" Liquori, the arcade owner and Oswald's friend, who was present the night Hammond died. Mulder finds Oswald's high scores on the game's display, realizing that he was playing that night; Oswald was the first of the victims, and the only one to have survived. Elsewhere, Oswald is at work at an auto repair shop when his boss's wife, Sharon Kiveat, walks in. He tries talking to Sharon, but she nervously rebuffs him; it is revealed that he had hit on her the day before and she turned him down. When the agents arrive and question Oswald, he claims to have not witnessed anything. However, Mulder's cell phone mysteriously overheats in Oswald's presence, to which he acts unsurprised.

Alarmed by the FBI's presence, Zero visits Oswald at his home that night; a drunk and rowdy Oswald dismisses Zero's worries and summons lightning to strike down nearby cattle. The lightning strikes him instead, but he appears unharmed. The next day, the agents visit the scene and find a melted shoe print in the ground, linking it to Oswald. Meanwhile, Oswald uses his abilities to manipulate local traffic lights, causing a car accident. The agents visit Oswald's home and find a cut-out picture of Sharon, his former high school teacher, inside a porn magazine.

At the scene of the car accident, Oswald's boss (who is also Sharon's husband) suffers an oddly timed heart attack. Oswald saves him by using his electrical powers as a makeshift defibrillator, much to the paramedics' surprise. The agents question Sharon at the hospital, who claims that Oswald told her about his powers. The agents also go through his medical records, showing that he exhibited acute hypokalemia—electrolytic imbalance in his blood. Oswald is brought in for questioning, but he proclaims his innocence and is eventually released by the local sheriff. Later, Oswald, believing that Zero ratted him out to the agents, uses his powers to strike him dead with lightning.

After learning of Oswald's release, Mulder and Scully rush to the hospital to protect the Kiveats, but the power goes out when they arrive and Zero's body appears in the elevator when its door slides open. Oswald confronts Scully and Sharon, and the latter fearfully agrees to leave with him in return for her husband's safety. The sheriff arrives and tries to stop him. While pursuing a fleeing Sharon, Oswald summons lightning but ends up striking himself once again and, in the process, kills the sheriff. Oswald is put in a psychiatric hospital, although the local district attorney has no idea how they will be able to prosecute him. As the agents observe Oswald, he uses his powers to change the channels of the TV in his room while the song "Live Fast, Diarrhea" by The Vandals is heard.

== Production ==
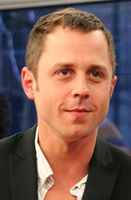
Giovanni Ribisi had to audition twice before being cast as title character Darin Peter Oswald.

The genesis of this episode can be traced back to a note card reading "Lightning Boy" that series creator Chris Carter had tacked to a board in his office since the first season. Carter's idea had not developed much beyond that two-word idea until the show's writers decided to approach the boy's power "as a metaphor for disenfranchised adolescence". Writer Howard Gordon described the episode's concept as "Beavis and Butt-Head electrified". "D.P.O." followed a string of mythology episodes, which Gordon believes caused this episode to suffer, conceptually. Then-story editor Frank Spotnitz claims that the writers initially thought about referencing the developments of these mythology episodes in "D.P.O.", but this plan was nixed due to Carter's desire to keep the mythology and monster-of-the-week episodes separate.

Giovanni Ribisi auditioned for the role of Darin twice: during his first try-out, Carter was dissatisfied with his performance, but after casting director Rick Millikan championed his cause and secured him another audition, Carter reconsidered his initial opinion. Spotnitz later described Ribisi's performance as "really, really good". The sheriff, Teller, was named after Teller from illusion and comedy duo Penn & Teller. The pair had wanted to appear on an episode of the show, but when conflicting schedules precluded this from happening, this reference was added instead. The "Astadourian Lightning Observatory" is fictional, and was named after Carter's executive assistant, Mary Astadourian. Darin Oswald was named after X-Files writer Darin Morgan.

Special effects supervisor David Gauthier created a unique "lightning machine" for the episode; the device, concealed in the ground, used mirrors and special generators to create the effect of lightning striking. The device was very powerful, producing 2.9 million cd of luminous intensity, and producing enough energy to "singe the grass." To keep Ribisi out of harm's way, he stood on a raised platform, which was hidden by special camera angles. The final effect was "augmented by sparks and smoke."

According to art director Graeme Murray, the scene in which Darin manipulates traffic lights required the construction of special street lights and a billboard, which could then be manipulated by the crew. This turned out to be "the biggest construction event" for the art crew. The farmhouse used for Darin's home, situated in Albion, British Columbia, had been used during the production of the movies Jennifer Eight (1992) and Jumanji (1995). The producers had difficulty securing permission to use a dead cow in the episode, due to concerns over animal rights groups. The art crew tried to create a faux-dead cow, but it did not look real. Consequently, the producers reached out to a slaughterhouse and were able to use a real corpse.

During the filming of this episode, director Kim Manners' best friend was killed. Due to the horrific nature of this turn of events, the production crew were willing to replace him with another director, but he insisted on completing the episode.

== Reception ==
"D.P.O." was first broadcast in the US on October 6, 1995, on Fox. The episode earned a Nielsen rating of 10.9, with a 20 share, meaning that roughly 10.9 percent of all television-equipped households, and 20 percent of households watching television, were tuned in to the episode. The episode was watched by 15.57 million viewers.

Entertainment Weekly gave "D.P.O." a B+, considering that despite the lack of action, it managed to "keep you glued" for the photography and "truly hilarious sociopathic high jinks". Emily VanDerWerff of The A.V. Club gave the same grade, praising Ribisi and Black's performances and "sequences that confidently walk the tricky line between horror and broad comedy", and marking it as the point where "the show's direction, always good, made the leap from consistently interesting to look at to consistently cinematic." Jane Goldman, in The X-Files Book of the Unexplained felt like the combination of Howard Gordon's "acutely observed dialogue" and Ribisi's "compelling performance" made Darin Oswald "one of season three's most memorable characters". Writing for Den of Geek, Nina Sordi put "D.P.O." only behind "Clyde Bruckman's Final Repose" as the best standalone season 3 episode, praising Ribisi's "all quiet, creepy power that eventually explodes into homicidal rage" and Jack Black's "weary and ultimately doomed sidekick". The plot for "D.P.O." was also adapted as a novel for young adults in 1996 by Neal Shusterman, under the title Voltage and the pseudonym Easton Royce.

== Bibliography ==
- Edwards, Ted (1996). X-Files Confidential. Little, Brown and Company. ISBN 0-316-21808-1.
- Goldman, Jane (1997). The X-Files Book of the Unexplained. Simon & Schuster. ISBN 0-684-81962-7.
- Gradnitzer, Louisa; Pittson, Todd (1999). X Marks the Spot: On Location with The X-Files. Arsenal Pulp Press. ISBN 1-55152-066-4.
- Hurwitz, Matt; Knowles, Chris (2008). The Complete X-Files. Insight Editions. ISBN 978-1-933784-80-9.
- Lovece, Frank (1996). The X-Files Declassified. Citadel press. ISBN 0-8065-1745-X.
- Lowry, Brian (1996). Trust No One: The Official Guide to the X-Files. Harper Prism. ISBN 0-06-105353-8.
