= Clyde Bruckman's Final Repose =

- The X-Files episode
- Clyde Bruckman dreams about his own body disintegrating. The scene used eight different stages, and mixed prosthetics and computer animation.
- Episode no.: Season 3 Episode 4
- Directed by: David Nutter
- Written by: Darin Morgan
- Production code: 3X04
- Original air date: October 13, 1995
- Running time: 45 minutes

Guest appearances
- Peter Boyle as Clyde Bruckman; Stu Charno as the killer; Jaap Broeker as The Stupendous Yappi

Episode chronology
← Previous "D.P.O."	Next → "The List"
- The X-Files season 3

"Clyde Bruckman's Final Repose" is the fourth episode of the third season of the American science fiction television series The X-Files. Directed by David Nutter and written by Darin Morgan, the installment serves as a "Monster-of-the-Week" story, that is, a stand-alone plot unconnected to the overarching mythology of The X-Files. Originally aired by the Fox network on October 13, 1995, "Clyde Bruckman's Final Repose" received a Nielsen rating of 10.2 and was seen by 15.38 million viewers. The episode received critical acclaim, and several writers have named it among the best in the series. The episode won both an Emmy for Outstanding Writing in a Drama Series as well as an Emmy for Outstanding Guest Actor in a Drama Series.

The show centers on FBI special agents Fox Mulder (David Duchovny) and Dana Scully (Gillian Anderson), who work on cases linked to the paranormal called X-Files. While Mulder is a believer in phenomena conventionally classed as paranormal, the skeptical Scully has been assigned to debunk his work. As they work together over time, the two have developed mutual professional respect and a deep friendship. In this episode, Mulder and Scully investigate a series of murders of psychics and fortune tellers. The two are assisted by Clyde Bruckman (Peter Boyle), an enigmatic and reluctant individual who possesses the ability to foresee how people are going to die.

Morgan wished to write an episode of The X-Files wherein one of the characters dies by suicide at the end. Although Morgan was initially afraid to add humor to his script, he created a compromise by making the episode as dark as possible. Several of the characters' names are references to silent film-era actors and screenwriters. Notably, the episode features a prediction by Bruckman—that Agent Scully will not die—that is later bookended by the sixth-season episode "Tithonus".

== Plot ==
In Saint Paul, Minnesota, Clyde Bruckman (Peter Boyle), an insurance salesman, buys scotch, a tabloid and a lottery ticket from a liquor store. Outside, he narrowly avoids colliding with an inconspicuous man (Stuart Charno), who heads to palm reader Madame Zelma (Karin Konoval). After seeking his fortune, the man then kills Zelma. Days later, the eyes and entrails of a tea leaf reader are discovered in her apartment. FBI agents Fox Mulder (David Duchovny) and Dana Scully (Gillian Anderson) are called in to assist the local police, who are also aided by an eccentric psychic: the Stupendous Yappi (Jaap Broeker). While the police are impressed by the psychic's supposed abilities, Mulder and Scully remain skeptical.

Meanwhile, Bruckman finds Zelma's body in his neighbor's dumpster. When interviewed by Mulder and Scully, he reveals details about the crime that he could not have known from the media accounts, which causes Mulder to believe that Bruckman has a psychic ability. Mulder insists that Bruckman help them find the tea leaf reader's body, whereupon her corpse is found in a nearby lake. After a series of psychic tests, Mulder concludes that Bruckman's only power is to see the details of people's deaths.

After examining the tea reader's body, Scully discovers a keychain that she links to an investment company owned by Claude Dukenfield; Bruckman sold Dukenfield an insurance policy and tells the agents that he was murdered. Bruckman guides Mulder and Scully to a nearby forest where he says Dukenfield's corpse is buried; as they tromp through the woods, Bruckman explains that following the deaths of Buddy Holly and the Big Bopper in a plane crash, he began obsessively thinking of the chain of events that led to the crash, which resulted in his developing psychic abilities. The trio soon find Dukenfield's body, upon which they discover traces of silk fiber, linking the murder to the previous victims.

At Bruckman's residence, he receives a note from the killer, predicting their first meeting. Intriguingly, the postmark predates Bruckman's involvement in the investigation, hinting at the killer's psychic capabilities. Bruckman describes Mulder's death as the killer sees it: getting his throat slit by the killer after stepping in a pie in a kitchen. Since the killer knows Bruckman's home address, Mulder and Scully bring him to a hotel where they take turns guarding him. While Scully does not believe in Bruckman's power, the two develop a fast friendship. Scully asks Bruckman if he can see his own end. He replies that he can see their end—that they will end up in bed together. This reinforces her skepticism. Bruckman then asks Scully why she is not interested in knowing how she will die. Scully finally asks him to tell her, to which Bruckman replies, "You don't."

Mulder and Scully are soon called to investigate the murder of another tarot card reader (Alex Diakun), and so a detective named Havez (Dwight McFee) takes over as Bruckman's guard. As the agents leave the hotel, they bump into a bellhop who is delivering food to Bruckman's room. The bellhop is actually the killer, and when he enters the room (while Havez is in the bathroom), he is delighted to discover that Bruckman has been brought to the place where he works. As he is about to kill Bruckman, Havez exits the bathroom, only to be killed by the bellhop. Meanwhile, Scully finds the same silk fiber at the new crime scene and, realizing that the bellhop had it on his tray, deduces that he is the murderer. The agents rush back to the hotel, with Mulder chasing the killer into a basement kitchen. After stepping in a pie, Mulder remembers Bruckman's premonition and narrowly dodges the bellhop. Scully arrives in the nick of time and shoots the bellhop; it turns out that what Bruckman had seen was the dying killer's last thoughts, not Mulder's.

Mulder and Scully return to Bruckman's apartment to find that Bruckman has died by suicide; Scully sits on Bruckman's bed holding his hand, deeply moved, just as he had predicted. Nights later, Scully sees a TV commercial from the Stupendous Yappi offering his services and throws her telephone at the screen in disgust.

== Production ==
=== Conception and writing ===
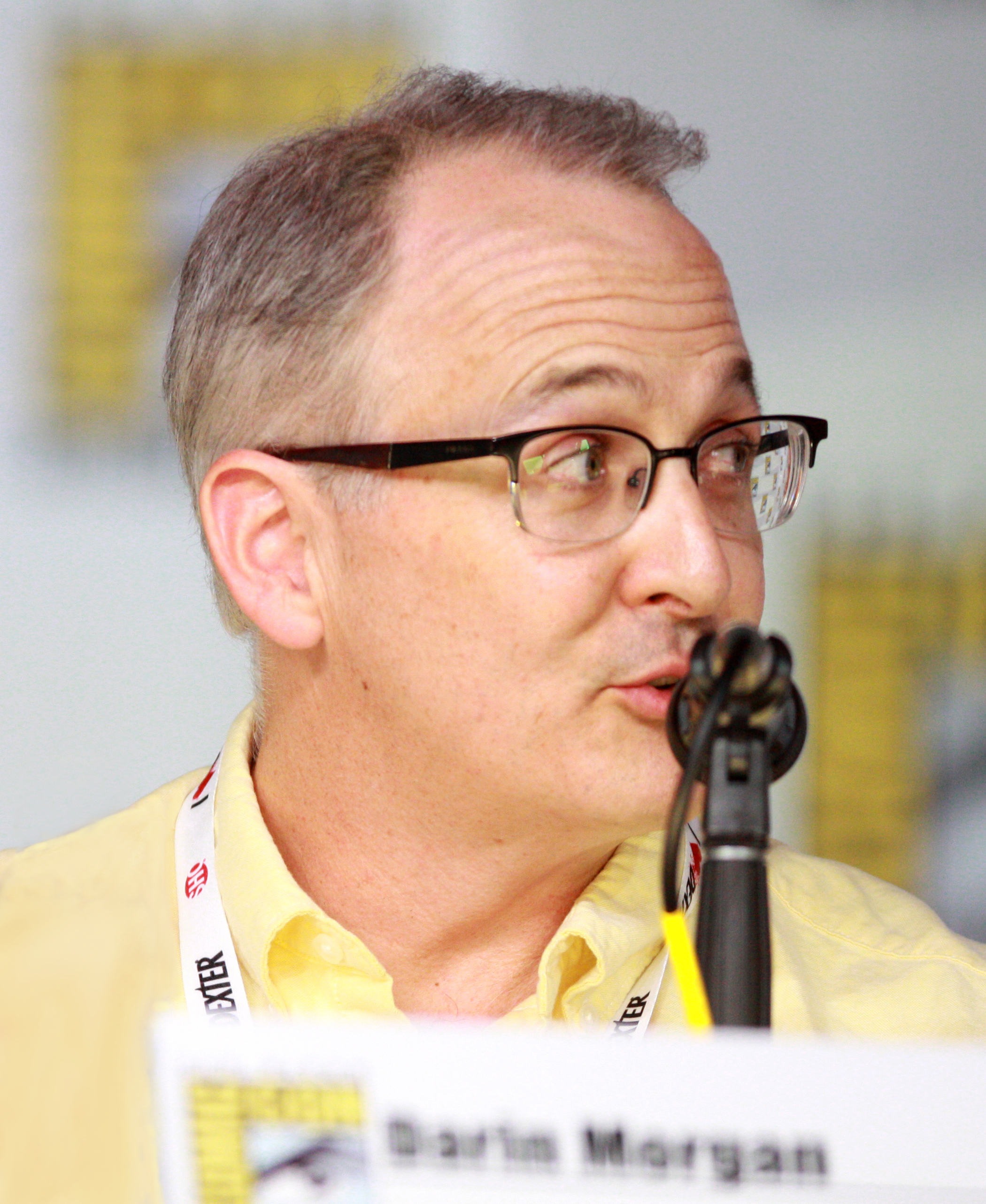
The episode was written by Darin Morgan, making it his second writing credit for the series

This episode was the second of four episodes written for the series by Darin Morgan during its initial run. Morgan had previously written the second season episode "Humbug", which was a stylistic break from the series' norm, being more overtly humorous. After working on said episode, Morgan worried that he had written the script the "wrong" way, and so he decided to write a more traditional X-Files story the next time he wrote an episode. To get inspiration, Morgan watched the first-season episode "Beyond the Sea", which features an unreliable criminal who claims to have psychic powers. Morgan was struck by the story and its tone, and sought to write a script that emulated its overall feel. Initially, Morgan was leery about focusing too much on humor, so he decided to make his episode very dark; in the end, however, he decided to lighten some of the mood by adding in some jokes. The tone of the episode was also affected by Morgan suffering from depression, which led to him developing a plot in which the main character kills himself in the end.

The episode focuses heavily on free will and fatalistic determinism—topics that Morgan was drawn to due to his frustration with the task of plotting episode stories. Morgan later explained that the way Bruckman and the killer interact was "really easy to plot, but [makes] the story seem complicated." While working on the script, Morgan realized that while Mulder is supposed to be intelligent, were he to talk to a "normal person" in real life, he would come across as paranoid or insane. The writer was thus inspired to "shake up Mulder's image" in the episode by making him fallible and foolish. This approach is illustrated by how Mulder views Bruckman "only as a phenomenon" and not as a person, whereas Scully views the titular character as a human, first and foremost.

Bruckman's cryptic prediction that Scully would not die "sent fans into a frenzy" due to its implications. Morgan claimed that Bruckman knew full well how Scully would die, but decided to withhold the information simply because he liked her. However, many interpreted the line to mean that Scully could not actually die and was, in essence, immortal. Frank Spotnitz later argued that this sub-plot was bookended by the sixth-season episode "Tithonus," which showed Scully starting to die, only to have her come back, fulfilling Bruckman's prophecy. Spotnitz later called this ending "very satisfying." However, in 2011, Spotnitz seemed to suggest that Scully was, in fact, immortal. This interpretation was seemingly verified by series creator Chris Carter in a 2014 reddit AMA.

Bruckman's quip about Fox Mulder dying by autoerotic asphyxiation was inspired both by the previous references in the series to Mulder's enjoyment of pornography, as well as a book that Morgan had read about homicide investigations. Morgan later noted that while Bruckman's line may have been prophetic, he added it simply to be funny.

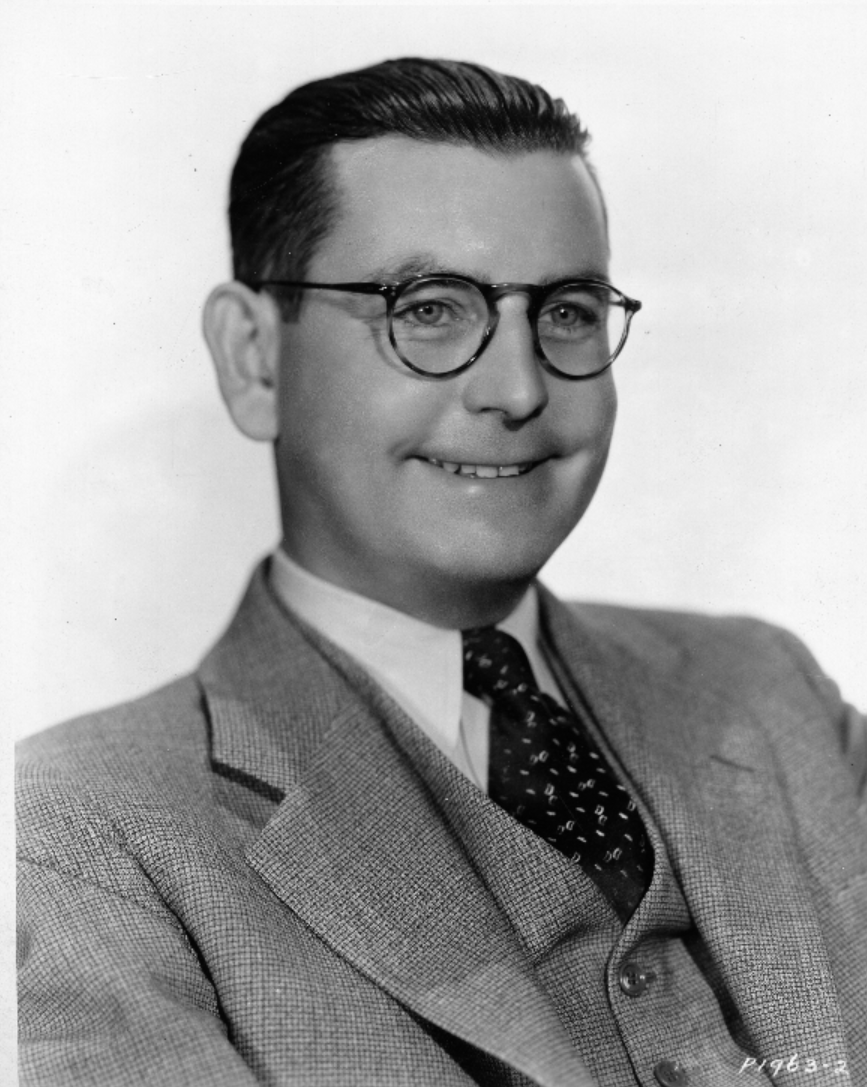
This episode was named after a real person. This Clyde Bruckman (pictured here in 1935) was a Hollywood comedy writer and director.

Many of the names used in the episode reference or allude to notable figures during the silent film era. The name "Clyde Bruckman", for instance, is a direct reference to a writer and director of classic comedies who died by suicide in 1955. Detective Havez and Detective Cline references the writer Jean C. Havez and the director Edward F. Cline, respectively. The names of one of the victims, Claude Dukenfield, was the real name of W. C. Fields. The name of the hotel in this episode, "Le Damfino", references the boat in the Buster Keaton movie The Boat.

=== Casting and filming ===
The titular character—who was based on Morgan's "depressive" father—was originally written with Bob Newhart in mind, but Peter Boyle was later cast. Although Chris Carter preferred to hire lesser-known individuals for the show, he believed Boyle to be "such a gifted character actor" that he made an exception. The character of the Stupendous Yappi, whom Morgan described as a cross between Uri Geller and the Amazing Kreskin, was specifically written for Jaap Broeker, David Duchovny's stand-in. The character later appeared again in the episode "Jose Chung's From Outer Space". Stuart Charno—credited as Stu Charno in the episode—played the killer in this episode; he is the husband of former series writer Sara Charno.

"Clyde Bruckman's Final Repose" was filmed in British Columbia, as was the rest of the show's third season. Visual effects producer Mat Beck and Toby Lindala created the elaborate dream sequence in which Bruckman's body decomposes. To create the effect, the design team rigged up a dummy with skeleton made out of copper wiring. The team then covered this frame with gelatinous skin and heated the wiring; this melted the skin, creating the illusion that the body was disintegrating. The entire sequence comprised eight discrete segments, some of which featured Boyle in makeup, some the dummy, and some a CGI skeleton. Because episode director David Nutter was working under a number of constraints, Morgan was effectively allowed to serve "as a producer", and after filming for the episode was completed, Morgan worked closely with the series' editor to produce the final cut. This version was originally 10 minutes over the time limit, resulting in multiple scenes featuring Bruckman and Scully being excised from the episode.

== Reception ==
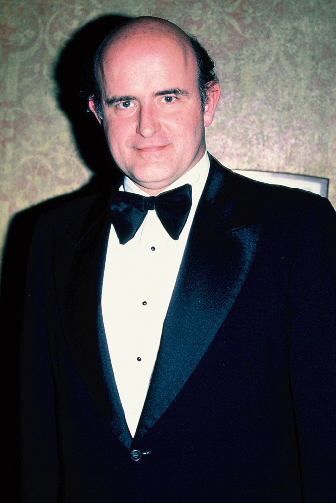
Boyle's portrayal of Clyde Bruckman won him an Emmy

"Clyde Bruckman's Final Repose" originally aired on the Fox network on October 13, 1995. The episode earned a Nielsen rating of 10.2, with an 18 share, meaning that roughly 10.2 percent of all television-equipped households, and 18 percent of households watching television, were tuned in to the episode. The episode was watched by 15.38 million viewers. The success of the episode led to it earning two Primetime Emmy Awards—writer Darin Morgan won the Emmy for Outstanding Writing in a Drama Series, while Peter Boyle won the Emmy for Outstanding Guest Actor in a Drama Series.

"Clyde Bruckman's Final Repose" has been critically lauded. Robert Shearman, in his book Wanting to Believe: A Critical Guide to The X-Files, Millennium & The Lone Gunmen, gave the episode a full five stars and called it "a little slice of genius". The author applauded the episode's rich humor, as well as its exploration of extremely dark themes in a lighthearted way. Shearman concluded that "the troubled questions Morgan poses here" about free will and death "are best answered by the writing of the episode itself … an episode like this isn't random—it's finely wrought, and thoughtful, and compassionate, and is a triumph of individualism." Author Phil Farrand rated the episode as his third favorite episode of the first four seasons in his book The Nitpickers Guide to the X-Files. Both Paul Cornell and Keith Topping, in the book Extreme Possibilities, applauded the episode; Cornell called it "an extraordinary piece of work" and altogether gorgeous", whereas Topping labelled it a "little gem". Conversely, Martin Day, in the same book, wrote a negative review, calling it "duller than a dull thing with dull knobs", despite noting that it was "clever and well-acted".

Paula Vitaris from Cinefantastique gave the episode four stars out of four and called it "one of those rare episodes where everything comes together—funny, bizarre, absurd, ironic, and sad." She applauded Boyle's acting, noting that he "gives a performance that simply takes over the TV screen", and argued that "only actors as strong as Duchovny and Anderson, with their blissfully deadpan delivery, could withstand such a titanic presence, but withstand it they do." Entertainment Weekly gave the episode a rare "A+", writing, "Boyle gets lots of help from another superlative, laugh-a-minute script [which] nicely captures one of the overarching themes of the show: fate and man's isolation." Reviewer Zack Handlen of The A.V. Club gave the episode an "A" and wrote positively of the ending, writing that, "for an episode that ends with a likable character killing himself, 'Bruckman' isn't what I'd call a downer." He called the entry his "favorite episode of The X-Files because it's funny, suspenseful, does well by Scully and Mulder, and creates some indelible characters."

Since its original airing, critics have listed "Clyde Bruckman's Final Repose" among the best X-Files episodes. Rolling Stone put it at #1 in the article "The X-Files: Every Episode Ranked From Worst to Best," calling it "heart-breaking," a "masterpiece," and "television perfection." TV Guide called it the tenth greatest episode in television history. Review website IGN named it the best standalone X-Files episode of the entire series, writing that the episode " is a distinctive episode of the series, mixing a healthy amount of humor [...] with some very nasty business [...] In just 44 minutes, Boyle creates a fully formed character who makes a big impact in his one and only appearance." Topless Robot named it the ninth-funniest episode of the series. Starpulse listed it as the third-best X-Files episode. Charlie Jane Anders and Javier Grillo-Marxuach of io9 included it on the list of "10 TV Episodes that Changed Television". Tom Kessenich, in Examination: An Unauthorized Look at Seasons 6–9 of the X-Files, named the episode the seventh-best installment of the series, noting that it features "a wonderful blend of humor, drama, and pathos, something The X-Files did better than just about any other show this past decade." The cast and crew of the series have expressed their enjoyment of the installment. Duchovny considers "Clyde Bruckman's Final Repose" to be one of his favorite episodes of the third season. Nutter highlighted it as one of the most enjoyable entries that he had worked on. He also noted that, "the writing was so tight and so crisp and so fresh that I think, as a director, the only thing you have to do is create the atmosphere, set up the characters, set up the shots and you are basically invisible. Then you step back and just let it happen." Series writer and producer Frank Spotnitz stated that the episode worked on many levels and that it is his favorite of the episodes written for the show by Morgan. In 2016, Ira Madison of Vulture.com named it the best episode of the series and "one of the best episodes of television ever", stating that the episode "takes every element that made the series so iconic and throws them all into one heartbreaking installment".

== See also ==
- List of television episodes listed among the best
