= Jose Chung's From Outer Space =

- The X-Files episode
- Agent Dana Scully reading the titular book. The cover is a parody of Whitley Strieber's Communion.
- Episode no.: Season 3 Episode 20
- Directed by: Rob Bowman
- Written by: Darin Morgan
- Production code: 3X20
- Original air date: April 12, 1996
- Running time: 44 minutes

Guest appearances
- Charles Nelson Reilly as Jose Chung; William Lucking as Roky Crikenson; Daniel Quinn as Jack Schaefer; Sarah Sawatsky as Chrissy Giorgio; Jason Gaffney as Harold Lamb; Alex Diakun as Dr. Fingers; Larry Musser as Detective Manners; Jaap Broeker as The Stupendous Yappi; Allan Zinyk as Blaine Faulkner; Michael Dobson as Sergeant Hynek; Mina E Mina as Dr. Hand; Jesse Ventura as Man in Black 1; Alex Trebek as Man in Black 2

Episode chronology
← Previous "Hell Money"	Next → "Avatar"
- The X-Files season 3

"Jose Chung's From Outer Space" is the 20th episode of the third season of the science fiction television series The X-Files. The episode first aired in the United States on April 12, 1996, on Fox. It was written by Darin Morgan and directed by Rob Bowman, and featured guest appearances by Charles Nelson Reilly, Jesse Ventura, and Alex Trebek. "Jose Chung's From Outer Space" earned a Nielsen household rating of 10.5, being watched by 16.08 million people in its initial broadcast, and also received praise from critics.

The show centers on FBI special agents Fox Mulder (David Duchovny) and Dana Scully (Gillian Anderson) who work on cases linked to the paranormal, called X-Files. In this episode, Mulder and Scully hear, and promptly investigate, a story about an alien abduction of two teenagers. Each witness provides a different version of the same facts. Within the episode, a thriller novelist, Jose Chung, writes a book about the incident.

The episode is a stand-alone episode of The X-Files (rather than an entry in the "mytharc"). While it follows the normal villain of the week pattern of those episodes, it features more humor than typical via manipulation of point of view, leading to multiple re-tellings of certain events with varying degrees of unreliable narrators. It is widely regarded as one of the best episodes of the series.

== Plot ==
In Klass County, Washington, teenagers Harold and Chrissy are driving home when their car suddenly stops. As they step out, a UFO appears, and they are abducted by two grey aliens—who are soon confronted by a larger alien of a different species. The greys panic and begin speaking English.

Later, author Jose Chung (Charles Nelson Reilly) interviews Agent Dana Scully (Gillian Anderson) for a book on alien abductions. Scully recalls that Chrissy's clothes were found inside out, suggesting that she had been the victim of date rape. However, when questioned, Harold claimed that he did not rape Chrissy and that the two had instead been abducted by aliens. Mulder (David Duchovny) has Chrissy hypnotized; she describes being in a spaceship with grey aliens, one of whom probes her mind psychically. This differs from Harold's account, which involves being trapped in a cage along with Chrissy and a grey alien in a nearby cage repeating "This is not happening." Mulder becomes convinced they were abducted.

Scully recounts how she and Mulder interviewed power company lineman Roky Crikenson, who claimed to witness the abduction and wrote a screenplay about it. He said he was later visited by men in black (played by Jesse Ventura and Alex Trebek), who told him he had only seen the planet Venus. (Roky's story also includes an encounter he had with a third alien, Lord Kinbote, who took him to the center of the Earth.) Fantastical flourishes notwithstanding, Mulder felt that Roky's story was enough evidence to have Chrissy re-hypnotized to see if her story better aligns with Harolds on further inquiry. This time, she claimed she had been abducted by the military, who brainwashed her into believing it was aliens.

Chung next interviews a science fiction enthusiast named Blaine, who claims to have seen Mulder and Scully (whom he believes were "men in black") recover an alien corpse. Blaine says that Mulder shrieked at the sight of the alien corpse, and that "Scully"—whom he insists was a disguised man—threatened him into silence. Blaine then says that Mulder let him film Scully perform an autopsy of the body, which that revealed the "alien" was actually a United States Air Force pilot in costume. Thereafter, the military arrived to retrieve the body, but not before Mulder managed to trick them into revealing the name of a second missing pilot, Lieutenant Jack Schaefer.

The episode then cuts back to Chung's interview with Scully. According to Scully, after the autopsy, Mulder found Schaefer in a dazed state, walking naked down a local highway. After getting him some clothes, Mulder then took Schaefer to a diner, where the pilot explained that he and his partner had been dressed as aliens while flying a secret U.S. military vehicle designed to resemble a UFO. Schaefer confessed that he, his partner, and the two teenagers had been abducted by real aliens in a real UFO. Suddenly, Schaefer's superiors arrived and took him away. (At this point, Chung interrupts Scully and reveals that the diner's cook told him a different version of the story: according to the cook, Mulder visited the diner alone and kept asking strange questions about UFOs while ordering piece after piece of sweet potato pie.)

Scully then continues her story, claiming that, after the autopsy, the next thing she remembers is waking up the next morning to find that Mulder had slept in a chair in her room. (According to Mulder, after leaving the diner, he returned to the motel and found the men in black from earlier in her room, with Scully herself in some sort of trance; Scully insists that she has no memory of this occurrence.) Mulder and Scully then visited the site of a crashed Air Force plane, where the dead bodies of the two pilots, including Schaefer, were recovered.

Sometime after interviewing Scully, Chung is visited by Mulder, who pleads with him not to publish his book, since it will further discredit UFO researchers and witnesses by making them look ridiculous. Chung dismisses Mulder and publishes it anyway. The finalized work reveals that Roky has moved to California and has founded a cult based on the teachings of Lord Kinbote, Blaine has replaced Roky as a power company lineman and continues to search for UFOs; and that Harold professed his love to Chrissy, only for her to reject him and dedicate her life to philanthropy; Mulder, on the other hand, is written-off as "a ticking time bomb of insanity”. The book ends with Chung concluding that the evidence for extraterrestrial life remains elusive.

== Production ==
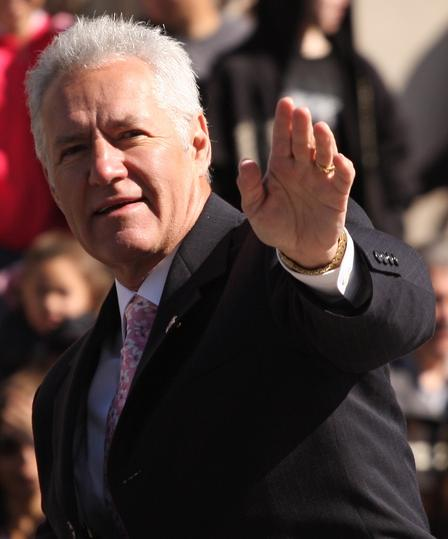
Jeopardy! host Alex Trebek appears as one of the Men in Black.

Disparate ideas that would eventually coalesce into "Jose Chung's From Outer Space" had been developed by writer Darin Morgan long before the script was actually written. The writer was inspired both by works he had read on hypnosis, as well as the theory that UFOs are real ships that can manipulate space and time, but they are piloted not by aliens but by the U.S. military. The episode's unique narrative style was influenced by a casting session that Morgan had attended in which an actor had mimicked the vocal styling of Truman Capote. Morgan soon thereafter developed an idea about a writer, Jose Chung, covering an X-file investigation. Morgan wanted to cast Rip Taylor in the role, but he was unavailable, so the role ended up going to Charles Nelson Reilly. Jesse Ventura was cast as one of the men in black, while Jeopardy! host Alex Trebek played the other. (Morgan himself had wanted Johnny Cash for the role.) Lord Kinbote was played by series stuntman Tony Morelli.

This episode would be Darin Morgan's last for the series before its revival in 2016. The writer claimed that he could not keep up with the frantic pace of the show, although he would later write the similarly themed "Jose Chung's Doomsday Defense" for the TV series Millennium.

== Reception ==
"Jose Chung's From Outer Space" premiered on the Fox network on April 12, 1996. This episode earned a Nielsen rating of 10.5, with a 19 share, meaning that roughly 10.5 percent of all television-equipped households, and 19 percent of households watching television, were tuned in to the episode. This totaled 16.08 million viewers.

The cast and crew of The X-Files reacted positively to the episode. Gillian Anderson cited the episode as being among her highlights of the third season. She said the episode was like dessert, adding "That's what kept it fun and that's what kept it worth doing all the time." Chris Carter said of writer Darin Morgan, "It's been a wonderful coincidence of timing, talent, and the success of the show, allowing it to stretch in a direction it would never have been able to if it had been a less successful or if it had been a younger show. Darin is a truly original comic mind. I don't know anybody in the world working in film, and that's what we work in here even though it appears on television, who has the voice Darin has. He is one in many million." Co-Producer Paul Rabwin said of the episode "An instant classic. One of those seminal episodes. You know, when people talk about The Twilight Zone, they say 'Remember "Eye of the Beholder"?' Or "Trouble with Tribbles" on the original Star Trek. 'Jose Chung' is going to be one of those episodes that is immediately revered." Assistant director Tom Braidwood appreciated Charles Nelson Reilly's presence, saying that he captivated virtually everyone and gave everyone a lift, nicknaming everyone on the crew. Executive Producer Robert Goodwin said that the casting of Reilly was the most fun of the episode.

"Jose Chung's From Outer Space" received praise from critics as well. Author Phil Farrand rated the episode as his favorite episode of the first four seasons in his book The Nitpickers Guide to the X-Files. Entertainment Weekly gave the episode an A, writing "A series so bleepin' ripe for parody brilliantly turns the tables on itself. Two (of many) guffaw-worthy moments: Mulder's squeal and the smoking alien." Reviewer Emily St. James from The A.V. Club gave the episode a rare A+ and wrote that the episode "is one of the very finest episodes of television I've ever seen, but I'm not sure it's a terrific episode of The X-Files. [...] If The X-Files were a The Lord of the Rings-length novel, then "Jose Chung's" would be its first appendix, a source that is at once in love with the main text and critical of it, a place where real human concerns creep around the edges of the show's chilly implausibilities." St. James's colleague Zack Handlen wrote that the episode was "brilliant", but he did not feel it was as satisfying as he anticipated because it did not contribute to the series as a whole. Review website IGN named it the fourth best standalone X-Files episode of the entire series, writing, "it was 'Jose Chung's From Outer Space' in Season 3 that showed that X-Files could create a true comedy masterpiece that almost completely broke away from the show's usual format and tone." Den of Geek listed it as the tenth best episode of the series.

== See also ==
- Jose Chung's Doomsday Defense
- Richard Sharpe Shaver
- Indrid Cold

== Bibliography ==
- Berger, Arthur Asa, ed. (1998). The Postmodern Presence: Readings on Postmodernism in American Culture and Society. Walnut Creek, CA: AltaMira Press.
- Edwards, Ted (1996), X-Files Confidential, Little, Brown and Company, ISBN 0-316-21808-1
- Farrand, Phil (1998), The Nitpickers Guide to the X-Files, Doubleday Direct, ISBN 1-56865-503-7
- Genge, Ngaire (1996), The Unofficial X-Files Companion II, Avon Books, ISBN 0-380-79024-6
- Hurwitz, Matt; Knowles, Chris (2008), The Complete X-Files, Insight Editions, ISBN 978-1-933784-80-9
- Levy, Michael M.; Mendelsohn, Farah (2019). Aliens in Popular Culture. Santa Barbara, CA: ABC-CLIO. ISBN 9781440838330.
- Lowry, Brian (1995), The Truth is Out There: The Official Guide to the X-Files, Harper Prism, ISBN 0-06-105330-9
