= Villain of the week =

Antagonist that only appears in one episode

A "villain of the week" or, depending on genre, "monster of the week" (MOTW) or "freak of the week", is an antagonist that only appears in one episode of a multi-episode work of fiction, such as a television series, and is usually never seen or heard from again.

The expression "monster of the week" was first used during the production of the 1960s series The Outer Limits. However, the origins of the concept predate this.

== Use in television ==
As many TV shows of the "villain-of-the-week" type air episodes weekly at a rate of ten to twenty new episodes per year, there is often a new antagonist in the plot of each week's episode. The main characters usually confront and vanquish these characters, often never encountering them again.

Shows that use such characters include Doctor Who, Scooby-Doo, Kolchak: The Night Stalker, The X-Files and its spin-off Millennium, Charmed, Smallville, Supernatural, Primeval, Justified and Grimm. Some series alternate between using such antagonists and furthering the series' ongoing plotlines (as in Buffy the Vampire Slayer, Supernatural, Fringe, JoJo's Bizarre Adventure, and The X-Files), while others use these one-time foes as pawns of the recurring adversaries (as in Kamen Rider, Sailor Moon, the Ultra series and Super Sentai and its American equivalent, Power Rangers).

In The X-Files, some monsters of the week make return appearances. In other series, villains may return reformed, becoming invaluable allies or gaining a larger role in the story.

While the defeat of the villain of the week in each episode allows the presentation of heroic action, "satisfying the casual or infrequent viewer", the "domestic melodrama" and personal relationships of the characters in contrast are usually developed over the course of a number of episodes sustaining interest for "regular viewers and fans".

== Reception ==
The villain-of-the-week format has been considered a "traditional plot formula" and a "standard format for genre television" until the 1980s. Since then, a trend towards longer story arcs has led to villain-of-the-week installments being negatively considered "filler episodes" with "lazy" storytelling. According to Screen Rant, viewers are increasingly familiar with the format, making it a less popular choice for writers. Charlie Jane Anders has described it as "an endangered beast".

"Villain-of-the-week" plotlines are attractive to syndicators, as it means that episodes can be rerun in any order and do not need to be aired in sequence as serials with continuing storylines do.

== See also ==
- Big Bad
- Episodic storytelling
- Plot device
