= List of guest appearances on The X-Files =

This is a list of actors who appeared in the long-running science fiction television series, The X-Files.

== A ==
- Andrew Airlie ("The Jersey Devil")
- Krista Allen ("First Person Shooter")
- Christopher Allport ("Lazarus")
- Lauren Ambrose ("Babylon", "My Struggle II")
- Robbie Amell ("Babylon", "My Struggle II")
- Erich Anderson ("Invocation")
- Michael J. Anderson ("Humbug")
- Sam Anderson ("The Pine Bluff Variant")
- Zachary Ansley ("Pilot")
- Samaire Armstrong ("Lord of the Flies")
- Tim Armstrong ("Home Again")
- Madeleine Arthur ("Ghouli")
- Edward Asner ("How the Ghosts Stole Christmas")
- Jayne Atkinson ("Fearful Symmetry")
- Erick Avari ("Lord of the Flies")
- Nicki Aycox ("Rush")
- John Aylward ("Sunshine Days")

== B ==
- Steve Bacic ("Soft Light", "Pusher", "Folie a Deux")
- Scott Bairstow ("Miracle Man")
- Gillian Barber ("Ghost in the Machine", "Red Museum")
- Raymond J. Barry ("Little Green Men", "Nisei", "S.R. 819")
- Frances Bay ("Excelsis Dei")
- Jim Beaver ("Field Trip")
- Henry Beckman ("Squeeze", "Tooms", "Chinga")
- Jason Beghe ("Darkness Falls")
- James Bell ("Squeeze")
- Marshall Bell ("Fallen Angel")
- Tobin Bell ("Brand X")
- Richard Belzer ("Unusual Suspects")
- Paul Ben-Victor ("Tooms")
- Matthew Bennett ("The Host")
- Abraham Benrubi ("Arcadia")
- Daniel Benzali ("Fresh Bones")
- Xander Berkeley ("Ice")
- Michael Berryman ("Revelations")
- Richard Beymer ("Sanguinarium")
- Casey Biggs ("Vienen")
- John Billingsley ("Three of a Kind")
- Raye Birk ("War of the Coprophages")
- Jack Black ("D.P.O.")
- Rubén Blades ("El Mundo Gira")
- Susan Blommaert ("Die Hand Die Verletzt")
- Sam Bottoms ("Revelations")
- Dennis Boutsikaris ("Brand X")
- Michael Ray Bower ("First Person Shooter")
- Tom Bower ("Rush")
- Lombardo Boyar ("X-Cops")
- Lynda Boyd ("Fire", "F. Emasculata")
- Katy Boyer ("Hellbound")
- Peter Boyle ("Clyde Bruckman's Final Repose")
- Jay Brazeau (“Lazarus”, “One Breath”)
- W. Earl Brown ("Underneath")
- Michael Bublé ("Piper Maru", "Apocrypha")
- Tara Buck ("Orison")
- A.J. Buckley ("War of the Coprophages")
- Genevieve Buechner ("Nothing Lasts Forever")
- Jere Burns ("Nothing Lasts Forever")
- Darren E. Burrows ("Monday")
- Dan Butler ("Die Hand Die Verletzt")
- Tom Butler ("Ghost in the Machine")

== C ==
- R.D. Call ("Miracle Man")
- Bruce Campbell ("Terms of Endearment")
- Ron Canada ("Empedocles")
- Timothy Carhart ("2Shy")
- Alex Carter ("Familiar")
- Christine Cavanaugh ("Small Potatoes")
- Nicola Cavendish (“One Breath”)
- Garry Chalk ("Babylon")
- Erin Chambers ("Familiar")
- Stuart Charno ("Clyde Bruckman's Final Repose")
- François Chau ("Ghouli")
- Lilyan Chauvin ("The Calusari")
- Nick Chinlund ("Irresistible", "Orison")
- Eric Christmas ("Excelsis Dei")
- Debra Christofferson ("Arcadia")
- Julian Christopher ("My Struggle II")
- Charles Cioffi ("Pilot")
- Dick Clark ("Millenium")
- Helene Clarkson ("The Calusari")
- Kristen Cloke ("The Field Where I Died", "Rm9sbG93ZXJz")
- Robert Clothier ("Red Museum", "Piper Maru")
- Randall "Tex" Cobb ("Fight Club")
- Frederick Coffin ("Fallen Angel")
- Signy Coleman ("Unusual Suspects", "Three of a Kind")
- Brendan Patrick Connor ("Kitten")
- Scott Cooper ("Rush")
- Matt Corboy ("Rm9sbG93ZXJz")
- Ben Cotton ("Ghouli")
- Bernie Coulson ("Anasazi")
- Richard Cox ("Brand X")
- Bryan Cranston ("Drive")
- Denise Crosby ("Empedocles", "Essence")
- Garvin Cross ("Fearful Symmetry", "Herrenvolk")
- Melinda Culea ("Alpha")
- Colin Cunningham ("End Game", "731", "Wetwired")
- John Cygan ("Blood")

== D ==
- Rhys Darby ("Mulder and Scully Meet the Were-Monster")
- Lisa Darr ("Underneath")
- Don S. Davis ("Beyond the Sea", "One Breath")
- David Denman ("Field Trip")
- Catherine Dent ("Trevor")
- William Devane ("The Truth")
- Cliff DeYoung ("Pilot")
- Dale Dickey ("Existence")
- John Diehl ("Trevor")
- Garret Dillahunt ("Travelers")
- Badja Djola ("The List")
- Michael Dobson ("Jose Chung's From Outer Space")
- Chad Donella ("Hungry")
- Aaron Douglas ("Founder's Mutation")
- Brad Dourif ("Beyond the Sea")
- Bill Dow ("The Jersey Devil")
- Ann Dowd ("Rush")
- Billy Drago ("Theef")
- Minnie Driver ("Hollywood A.D.")
- West Duchovny (“My Struggle IV”)
- Thomas F. Duffy ("Alpha")
- Nora Dunn ("Dreamland", "Dreamland II")
- Wayne Duvall ("Ghost in the Machine")
- Eugene Dynarski ("Patience")

== E ==
- Rodney Eastman ("Invocation")
- Tracey Ellis ("Oubliette")("Audrey Pauley")
- Michael Emerson ("Sunshine Days")
- Bradford English ("Patience")
- The Enigma ("Humbug")
- R. Lee Ermey ("Revelations")
- Christine Estabrook ("Young at Heart")
- Art Evans ("Fight Club")

== F ==
- Michael Fairman ("Synchrony")
- David Faustino ("Sunshine Days")
- Myles Ferguson ("F. Emasculata", "Schizogeny")
- Louis Ferreira ("Ghouli")
- Gavin Fink ("Scary Monsters")
- Christine Firkins ("Within", "Without")
- Frances Fisher ("Essence")
- Colleen Flynn ("Detour", "all things")
- Megan Follows ("Per Manum")
- Ken Foree ("The List")
- Jodie Foster ("Never Again")
- Colby French ("Millennium")
- Michael Bryan French ("Deep Throat")
- Joseph Fuqua ("Synchrony")
- Jim Fyfe ("Three of a Kind", "Jump the Shark")

== G ==
- M. C. Gainey ("Vienen")
- Lorena Gale ("Shadows")
- Spencer Garrett ("Sein und Zeit")
- Willie Garson ("The Walk", "The Goldberg Variation")
- Brian George ("The Sixth Extinction II: Amor Fati")
- Ashlyn Gere ("Blood")
- Marcus Giamatti ("Jump the Shark")
- Don Gibb ("Conduit")
- William Gibson ("First Person Shooter")
- Matthew Glave ("The Truth")
- Trevor Goddard ("Triangle")
- Mike Gomez ("Little Green Men")
- Walter Gotell ("Paper Clip")
- Beth Grant ("Signs and Wonders")
- Jason Gray-Stanford ("The Jersey Devil")
- Seth Green ("Deep Throat")
- Ellen Greene ("Improbable")
- Kim Greist ("Invocation")
- Zach Grenier ("Alone")
- David Alan Grier ("Hollywood A.D.")
- Jon Gries ("Sleepless")
- Kathy Griffin ("Fight Club")
- David Groh ("Kaddish")
- Arye Gross ("Salvage")
- Gary Grubbs ("Our Town")

== H ==
- Stacy Haiduk ("all things")
- Carrie Hamilton ("Monday")
- Laura Harris ("Die Hand Die Verletzt")
- Anthony Harrison ("Conduit")
- John Hawkes ("Milagro")
- Anthony Heald ("Closure")
- Lance Henriksen ("Millennium")
- Jimmy Herman ("Shapes")
- Barbara Hershey ("My Struggle III")
- Grant Heslov ("Via Negativa")
- Jennifer Hetrick ("Avatar")
- Matt Hill ("Fresh Bones")
- Judith Hoag ("Hungry")
- Susan Lee Hoffman ("Synchrony")
- Laurie Holden ("Herrenvolk, Teliko, Tunguska (The X-Files), Unrequited (The X-Files), Zero Sum (The X-Files), Patient X (The X-Files), The Red and the Black (The X-Files), One Son, Requiem (The X-Files), The Truth (The X-Files)")
- Sandrine Holt ("This")
- James Hong ("Hell Money")
- Michael Horse ("Shapes")
- Rance Howard ("My Struggle")
- Rhys Huber ("The Jersey Devil")
- Felicity Huffman ("Ice")
- Alf Humphreys ("Space", "The Blessing Way", "Detour")
- Brian Huskey ("The Lost Art of Forehead Sweat")
- Doug Hutchison ("Squeeze", "Tooms")
- Scott Hylands ("Unrequited")
- Steve Hytner ("Ice")

== I ==
- Frankie Ingrassia ("The Rain King")
- Katharine Isabelle ("Schizogeny")
- Željko Ivanek ("Roland")

== J ==
- Victoria Jackson ("The Rain King")
- Colton James ("Invocation")
- Graham Jarvis ("Young at Heart")
- Anjali Jay ("My Struggle III")
- Ricky Jay ("The Amazing Maleeni")
- Sarah Jeffery ("Ghouli")
- Ken Jenkins ("Medusa")
- Penny Johnson Jerald ("Medusa")
- Andrew Johnston ("Deep Throat", "Colony", "End Game", "Demons")
- O-Lan Jones ("Sanguinarium")
- Kathryn Joosten ("Trust No 1")

== K ==
- Hiro Kanagawa ("Firewalker", "Synchrony", "My Struggle")
- Caroline Kava ("Our Town")
- Eric Keenleyside ("All Souls")
- Lisa Robin Kelly ("Syzygy")
- Kari Kennell ("Hellbound")
- Janet Kidder ("Babylon")
- Patrick Kilpatrick ("Surekill")
- Ken Kirzinger ("Ice")
- Tuesday Knight ("Trevor")
- Mickey Knox ("S.R. 819")
- Jeff Kober ("Ice")
- Karin Konoval ("Clyde Bruckman's Final Repose", "Home", "Plus One")
- Ken Kramer ("War of the Coprophages")
- Kay E. Kuter ("The Calusari")

== L ==
- Rob LaBelle ("Ghost in the Machine")
- Shia LaBeouf ("The Goldberg Variation")
- Tyler Labine ("War of the Coprophages", "Quagmire", "Mulder and Scully Meet the Were-Monster")
- Caroline Lagerfelt ("The Gift")
- Campbell Lane ("Miracle Man", "The Calusari", "Tunguska", "Terma")
- Robert LaSardo ("The Amazing Maleeni")
- Sydney Lassick ("Elegy")
- Ed Lauter ("Space")
- Lucy Lawless ("Nothing Important Happened Today" Parts One and Two)
- Gene LeBell ("Fight Club")
- Kristin Lehman ("Kill Switch")
- Fredric Lehne ("Travelers", "The Unnatural")
- Téa Leoni ("Hollywood A.D.")
- Mimi Lesseos ("Fight Club")
- Jonathan Levit ("The Amazing Maleeni")
- David Lewis ("The Jersey Devil", "Firewalker", "Oubliette")
- Geoffrey Lewis ("Tithonus")
- Andrea Libman ("Born Again")
- Cody Lightning ("The Truth")
- Lucy Liu ("Hell Money")
- Ernie Lively ("D.P.O.")
- Robyn Lively ("Field Trip")
- Stephen Lobo ("Babylon")
- Donal Logue ("Squeeze")
- Brad Loree ("3", "Leonard Betts", "Unusual Suspects")
- William Lucking ("Jose Chung's From Outer Space")
- Carl Lumbly ("Teliko")
- Jane Lynch ("Lord of the Flies")

== M ==
- Annet Mahendru ("My Struggle")
- Wendie Malick ("The Beginning")
- Stuart Margolin ("The Lost Art of Forehead Sweat")
- Brian Markinson ("Born Again")
- Jesse L. Martin ("Irresistible", "The Unnatural")
- Benito Martinez ("The Beginning")
- Tom Mason ("Avatar")
- Michael Massee ("The Field Where I Died")
- Tom McBeath ("Space", "3", "Teso Dos Bichos")
- Heather McComb ("Die Hand Die Verletzt")
- Paul McCrane ("Leonard Betts")
- Neal McDonough ("Provenance", "Providence")
- Darren McGavin ("Travelers", "Agua Mala")
- Jack McGee ("Fight Club")
- Paul McGillion ("Small Potatoes")
- Richard McGonagle ("Deadalive")
- Michael McGrady ("The Gift")
- Melinda McGraw ("One Breath", "The Blessing Way", "Paper Clip", "Christmas Carol")
- Joel McHale ('My Struggle", "My Struggle II")
- Stephen McHattie ("Nisei", "731")
- Michael McKean ("Dreamland", "Dreamland II", "Three of a Kind", "Jump the Shark")
- Ray McKinnon ("Improbable")
- Kate McNeil ("Theef")
- Kevin McNulty ("Squeeze", "Soft Light")
- Jamie McShane ("Providence")
- Micole Mercurio ("Roland")
- Tracy Middendorf ("Signs and Wonders")
- John Milford ("Our Town")
- Gabrielle Miller ("Our Town", "Syzygy")
- Joel McKinnon Miller ("Agua Mala")
- Ty Miller ("Shapes")
- Deanna Milligan ("Irresistible")
- Judson Mills ("X-Cops")
- Silas Weir Mitchell ("Agua Mala")
- Zakes Mokae ("Teliko")
- Darin Morgan ("The Host", "Small Potatoes")
- Glenn Morshower ("All Souls")
- Janne Mortil ("Teso Dos Bichos")
- Joe Morton ("Redrum")
- Tegan Moss ("One Breath", "Piper Maru")
- Lachlan Murdoch ("The Jersey Devil")
- George Murdock ("The Red and the Black", "The End", "The Beginning", "Two Fathers")

== N ==
- Kumail Nanjiani ("Mulder and Scully Meet the Were-Monster")
- Arthur J. Nascarella ("Underneath")
- Eric Nenninger ("Signs and Wonders")
- Omari Newton ("Founder's Mutation")
- Dean Norris ("F. Emasculata")
- Marilyn Norry ("Memento Mori")
- Tom Noonan ("Paper Hearts")

== O ==
- Conor O'Farrell ("Roadrunners")
- John O'Hurley ("The Post-Modern Prometheus")
- Shannon O'Hurley ("Brand X")
- William O'Leary ("Roadrunners")
- Michael O'Neill ("Drive")
- Terry O'Quinn ("Aubrey", "Trust No 1")
- Cyril O'Reilly ("Hellbound")
- Randy Oglesby ("Signs and Wonders")
- Ty Olsson ("Kitsunegari")
- Leland Orser ("Firewalker")
- Holmes Osborne ("Millennium")
- Haley Joel Osment ("Kitten")

== P ==
- Joel Palmer ("Conduit")
- F. William Parker ("Chimera")
- Aaron Paul ("Lord of the Flies")
- Amanda Pays ("Fire")
- Mark Pellegrino ("Hungry")
- Emily Perkins ("All Souls")
- Bobbie Phillips ("War of the Coprophages")
- Tom Pickett ("Shadows")
- Byrne Piven ("Paper Hearts")
- Vic Polizos ("Pusher")
- Brian Poth ("Scary Monsters")
- CCH Pounder ("Duane Barry")
- Lawrence Pressman ("Roadrunners")
- Cynthia Preston ("Folie à Deux")
- Barry Primus ("Shadows")
- John Prosky ("Jump the Shark")
- John Pyper-Ferguson ("F Emasculata", "Emily", "Christmas Carol")

== R ==
- Natalie Radford ("The Gift")
- Steve Railsback ("Duane Barry", "Ascension")
- Anthony Rapp ("Detour")
- Sarah-Jane Redmond ("Aubrey", "Schizogeny")
- Jed Rees ("Synchrony")
- Perrey Reeves ("3")
- Lee Reherman ("Vienen")
- Charles Nelson Reilly ("Jose Chung's From Outer Space")
- James Remar ("Daemonicus")
- Patrick Renna ("Bad Blood")
- Callum Keith Rennie ("Lazarus", "Fresh Bones")
- Burt Reynolds ("Improbable")
- Ryan Reynolds ("Syzygy")
- Giovanni Ribisi ("D.P.O.")
- Miles Robbins ("Ghouli", "My Struggle IV")
- Ryan Robbins ("Founder's Mutation")
- Andrew Robinson ("Alpha")
- Zuleikha Robinson ("Jump the Shark")
- Charles Rocket ("Three of a Kind")
- Channon Roe ("Kaddish")
- Kacey Rohl ("Founder's Mutation")
- Clayton Rohner ("The Rain King")
- Mark Rolston ("Red Museum", "Sein und Zeit")
- Gabrielle Rose ("Deep Throat")
- Jim Rose ("Humbug")
- Teryl Rothery ("Excelsis Dei")
- Rodney Rowland ("Never Again")
- Deep Roy ("Badlaa")
- Jan Rubeš ("Tunguska", "Terma")
- Vyto Ruginis ("Medusa")
- Leon Russom ("Pilot")
- Steve Ryan ("Scary Monsters")

== S ==
- Vik Sahay ("Founder's Mutation")
- Paul Sand ("Red Museum")
- William Sanderson ("Blood")
- Miguel Sandoval ("Vienen")
- Zak Santiago ("Ghouli")
- Will Sasso ("Je Souhaite")
- John Savage ("Død Kalm")
- Doug Savant ("Founder's Mutation")
- Danielle Savre ("Sunshine Days")
- Diana Scarwid ("Kitsunegari")
- Wendy Schaal ("Chimera")
- Vincent Schiavelli ("Humbug")
- Rusty Schwimmer ("Roadrunners")
- Judith Scott ("Medusa")
- Judson Scott ("This is Not Happening", "DeadAlive", "Three Words")
- Rodney Scott ("Rush")
- Nestor Serrano ("Milagro")
- Brent Sexton ("Patience", "Medusa")
- Tony Shalhoub ("Soft Light")
- Garry Shandling ("Hollywood A.D.")
- Stan Shaw ("Audrey Pauley")
- Mark Sheppard ("Fire")
- Sab Shimono ("Excelsis Dei")
- Daryl Shuttleworth ("Home Again")
- Gregory Sierra ("The Jersey Devil")
- Michael B. Silver ("Dreamland", "Dreamland II")
- Isaac C. Singleton Jr. ("Triangle")
- Tucker Smallwood ("Home")
- Allison Smith ("Trust No 1")
- Charles Martin Smith ("F. Emasculata")
- Douglas Smith ("Home")
- Jamil Walker Smith ("Fresh Bones")
- Kurtwood Smith ("Grotesque")
- Shawnee Smith ("Firewalker")
- Carrie Snodgress ("Conduit")
- Mark Snow ("Per Manum")
- Veena Sood ("Shadows")
- Nancy Sorel ("The Walk")
- Sebastian Spence ("Home")
- Octavia Spencer ("Millennium")
- Jerry Springer ("The Post-Modern Prometheus")
- Jewel Staite ("Oubliette")
- Christopher Stanley ("Per Manum", "Empedocles")
- Claire Stansfield ("The Jersey Devil")
- Peter Stebbings ("Gender Bender")
- Sally Stevens ("The Rain King")
- Alexandra Stewart ("Pilot")
- Don Stewart ("Teliko")
- Malcolm Stewart ("Pilot")
- Sarah Strange ("Duane Barry")
- Don Swayze ("Hellbound")
- Keith Szarabajka ("Via Negativa")

== T ==
- Amanda Tapping ("Avatar")
- Lili Taylor ("Mind's Eye")
- Sharon Taylor ("Familiar")
- Jill Teed ("The Jersey Devil")
- Roy Thinnes ("Talitha Cumi" "Herrenvolk" "This Is Not Happening")
- Eddie Kaye Thomas ("Requiem", "This Is Not Happening")
- Susanna Thompson ("Space")
- Kenneth Tigar ('S.R. 819")
- Wayne Tippit ("The Jersey Devil")
- Tony Todd ("Sleepless")
- Lily Tomlin ("How the Ghosts Stole Christmas")
- Gordon Tootoosis ("Teso Dos Bichos")
- Ian Tracey ("The Walk")
- Saxon Trainor ("Per Manum")
- Alex Trebek ("Jose Chung's From Outer Space")
- Danny Trejo ("Redrum")
- Judd Trichter ("Requiem", "This Is Not Happening")
- Kett Turton ("The Pine Bluff Variant")

== U ==
- Andy Umberger ("Requiem")
- Jay Underwood ("Empedocles")

== V ==
- Justina Vail ("3")
- Rob Van Dam ("Fight Club")
- Jesse Ventura ("Jose Chung's From Outer Space")
- Pruitt Taylor Vince ("Unruhe")
- Daniel von Bargen ("The Pine Bluff Variant")

== W ==
- Shangela Laquifa Wadley ("Mulder and Scully Meet the Were-Monster")
- George D. Wallace ("Hellbound")
- J. T. Walsh ("The List")
- M. Emmet Walsh ("The Unnatural")
- Lisa Waltz ("Shadows")
- Jerry Wasserman ("Tooms", "Excelsis Dei")
- Kellie Waymire ("Surekill")
- Fritz Weaver ("Tunguska", "Terma")
- Timothy Webber ("Tooms", "Our Town", "Quagmire")
- Kevin Weisman ("Je Souhaite")
- Bruce Weitz ("Irresistible")
- Michael Welch ("Badlaa")
- Frank Welker ("Fearful Symmetry", "Teso Dos Bichos", "Patience")
- Titus Welliver ("Darkness Falls")
- Kenneth Welsh ("Revelations")
- Floyd "Red Crow" Westerman ("Anasazi", "The Blessing Way", "Paper Clip", "Biogenesis", "The Sixth Extinction II: Amor Fati")
- Maggie Wheeler ("Born Again")
- Dana Wheeler-Nicholson ("Syzygy")
- Bernard White ("This is Not Happening")
- Peter White ("Arcadia")
- Ted White ("Dreamland")
- Dondré Whitfield ("Within")
- Bradley Whitford ("Firewalker")
- Christine Willes ("Irresistible", "The Căluşari", "Elegy", "Founder's Mutation)
- Dick Anthony Williams ("Young at Heart")
- Wade Williams ("Salvage")
- Luke Wilson ("Bad Blood")
- Scott Wilson ("Orison")
- Robert Wisden ("Pusher", "Kitsunegari")
- Michael Wiseman ("Lord of the Flies")
- Rebecca Wisocky ("Founder's Mutation")
- Karen Witter ("D.P.O.")
- David Wohl ("Kaddish")
- BD Wong ("Hell Money")
- Bokeem Woodbine ("The List")
- Morgan Woodward ("Aubrey")
- Nicholas Worth ("The Goldberg Variation")

== Y ==
- Bellamy Young ("Redrum")
- Bruce A. Young ("Fresh Bones")
- Dey Young ("Born Again")
- Harris Yulin ("Hollywood A.D.")

== Z ==
- Kevin Zegers ("Revelations")
- Constance Zimmer ("First Person Shooter")

== See also ==
- List of regular and semi-regular appearances on The X-Files
- List of writers of The X-Files
- List of awards and nominations received by The X-Files
