= The Truth and the Light: Music from the X-Files =

Soundtrack album by Mark Snow
- Released: October 8, 1996
- Genres: Soundtrack; ambient music
- Length: 45:50
- Labels: Warner Bros. 46448
- Producers: Mark Snow; Jeff Charbonneau

The Truth and the Light: Music from the X-Files is a 1996 album by Mark Snow. The album is composed of excerpts of instrumental music scores from the first three seasons of the American science fiction television series The X-Files, on which Snow was the resident composer. These tracks are linked together with portions of dialogue from the series.

Released on October 8, 1996, the album received mixed reviews from critics. It reached a peak position of number forty-two in the UK albums chart, and spent four weeks in France's album charts, peaking at number nine.

== Track listing ==
All tracks are written by Chris Carter and Mark Snow.

No.	Title	Length
1.	"Introitus: Praeceps Transito Spatium" ("Død Kalm")	1:51
2.	"Materia Primoris: The X-Files Theme (Main Title)"	3:22
3.	"Raptus" ("Pilot")	3:16
4.	"Adflatus" ("One Breath")	4:00
5.	"Deverbero" ("F. Emasculata")	1:28
6.	"Cantus Excio" ("The Calusari")	4:42
7.	"Mercutura" ("Gender Bender")	3:23
8.	"Lamenta" ("Roland")	1:48
9.	"Insequi" ("Oubliette")	1:37
10.	"Otium" ("Conduit")	1:43
11.	"Dubitatio" ("Ghost in the Machine")	2:49
12.	"Iter" ("Nisei")	1:20
13.	"Progigno De Axis" ("Nisei")	1:35
14.	"Carmen Amatorium Ex Arcanum" ("3")	2:38
15.	"Facetus Malum" ("Humbug")	2:42
16.	"Memoria" ("Shapes")	2:02
17.	"Mitus Lumen" ("Soft Light")	2:41
18.	"Fides Fragilis" ("The Erlenmeyer Flask")	1:35
19.	"Exoptare Ex Veritas" ("Oubliette")	1:30
20.	"Kyrie" ("Grotesque")	1:43
21.	"The X-Files Theme (Flexifinger Terrestrial mix)" (International release only)	4:23
Total length:		45:50

== Personnel ==
- Composer – Mark Snow
- Concept; sound designer – Jeff Charbonneau
- Design, photography and illustration – Megan Snow, Sarah Snow
- Sound engineer and mixer – Larold Rebhun
- Assistant sound engineers – Richard Veltrap and Brian Virtue
- Liner notes – Chris Carter
- Sound mastering – Ramon Breton, Joe Gastwirt
- Producers – Chris Carter, Jeff Charbonneau, Mark Snow
- Cello – Erika Duke-Kirkpatrick
- Vocals – Gillian Anderson, Chris Carter, William B. Davis, Teri DeSario, Peter Donat, David Duchovny, Jerry Hardin, Alf Humphreys, Joel Palmer, Mitch Pileggi, Paul Rabwin, Steve Railsback, Larold Rebhun, Frank Spotnitz, Floyd Red Crow Westerman, Steven Williams,
- Words – Chris Carter

== Release ==
The Truth and the Light: Music from The X-Files was released by Warner Bros. Records on October 8, 1996, on both compact disc and compact cassette formats. It spent two weeks in the UK Albums Chart, reaching a peak position of number forty-two on September 12, 1996. The album spent four weeks in France's Syndicat National de l'Édition Phonographique album chart between September 14 and October 26, 1996. It entered the chart at number forty-two, before peaking at number nine, and finally dropping to number forty-three before leaving the chart entirely. A more comprehensive four-disc collection of Snow's compositions for The X-Files was released by record company La-La Land Records in May 2011, containing several of the cues found on The Truth and the Light.

== Reception ==
The Truth and the Light has received mixed reviews from critics. AllMusic's Stephen Thomas Erlewine rated the album four stars out of five, calling it "evocative and eerie", noting that "it holds up surprisingly well when isolated from the visuals" of the series. Filmtracks.com's Christian Clemmensen rated it two stars out of five, calling it a "basically adequate souvenir of sorts". Clemmensen lamented that the inclusion of dialogue from the series hindered the album as a whole, explaining that "inconsistent incorporation of dialogue hinders the album's continuity". He also felt that the cues included on the album did not reflect Snow's best work on the series, which in his view would come from the later seasons, but that the album instead reflected "Snow's darker, ambient, and atonal music", though admitting that there was still an audience for "those creepy sounds".

== Extended track listing with additional details ==
Track	Title	Title Translation	Length	Music	Quote(s)
1	Introitus: Praeceps Transito Spatium	The Beginning: Quickly Across the Void	1:51	2x19 Død Kalm	Fox Mulder in 3x13 Syzygy)
2	Materia Primoris: The X-Files Theme (Main Title)	Main Title	3:22		
3	Raptus	Abduction	3:16	1x79 Pilot	2x05 Duane Barry
4	Adflatus	Breathing upon	3:36	2x08 One Breath (23")	3x01 The Blessing Way, 3x16 Apocrypha (Cigarette Smoking Man: "You can trust all of us.")
5	Deverbero	Thrashing	1:28	2x22 F. Emasculata (15")	2x10 Red Museum (35")
6	Cantus Excio	Rousing Song	4:42	2x21 The Calusari (15",21",23")	
7	Mercutura	Merchandise	3:23	1x13 Gender Bender (38"), 2x22 F. Emasculata (27")	2x25 Anasazi (21", Bill Mulder)
8	Lamenta	Lamentation	1:48	1x22 Roland	2x06 Ascension, 2x22 F. Emasculata (26", Fox Mulder - "Why weren't we told the truth?", Cigarette Smoking Man - "The truth would have caused panic. Panic would have cost lives.", Cigarette Smoking Man - "What's the truth, Agent Mulder?")
9	Insequi	Pursuit	1:37	3x08 Oubliette	
10	Otium	Peace	1:43	1x03 Conduit	
11	Dubitatio	Uncertainty	2:49	2x22 F. Emasculata (14",35"), 1x07 Ghost in the Machine	1x01 Deep Throat (Deep Throat, Fox Mulder)
12	Iter	Journey	1:20	3x09 Nisei	
13	Progigno De Axis	Bring Forth from the sky/ the Axis	1:35	3x09 Nisei	2x25 Anasazi (40", Dana Scully - "Mulder, in these files, I found references to experiments that were conducted here in the US by Axis-power scientists who were given amnesty after the war.")
14	Carmen Amatorium Ex Arcanum	Love Song from secrets	2:38	2x07 3	2x22 F. Emasculata (42", Walter Skinner - "I'm saying this as a friend. Watch your back. This is just the beginning.")
15	Facetus Malum	Graceful Evil	2:42	2x20 Humbug (12",20")	
16	Memoria	Remembering	2:02	1x18 Shapes	3x01 The Blessing Way
17	Mitis Lumen	Soft Light	2:41	2x23 Soft Light (0",9",27",34")	2x06 Ascension (Dana Scully - "Mulder!), 2x25 Anasazi (42", Cigarette Smoking Man - "Burn it!")
18	Fides Fragilis	Fragile Faith	1:35	1x23 The Erlenmeyer Flask	2x16 Colony (0", Fox Mulder)
19	Exoptare Ex Veritas	Desire for the Truth	1:30	3x08 Oubliette	3x02 Paper Clip
20	Kyrie	O Lord	2:57	3x14 Grotesque (1:42 - 2:57)	"Apology is policy" derived from episode 3x10 731
21	The X-Files Theme (Flexifinger Terrestrial mix) (UK release only)		4:23		
