= Les Martin =

US speculative fiction writer (born 1934)

- Born: September 3, 1934 (age 91); New York City, New York, U.S.
- Occupation: Writer
- Writing career
- Period: 1971 – present

Lester Martin Schulman (born September 3, 1934), who writes as Les Martin, is an American writer of speculative fiction media tie-ins, particularly within the Blade Runner, Frankenstein, Indiana Jones, and The X-Files fiction series.

== Education and career ==
Schulman received a Bachelor of Arts degree from Antioch College in 1955. He was an editor for Popular Library (1963–1965), Bantam Books (1966–1967), and Dell Publishing from 1969.

== Select bibliography ==
=== Indiana Jones ===
- Indiana Jones and the Temple of Doom (1984) – young-adult novelization of the 1984 film
- Indiana Jones and the Last Crusade (1989) – young-adult novelization of the 1989 film

=== Young Indiana Jones ===
Young-adult novels set in the Young Indiana Jones universe

- Young Indiana Jones and the Tomb of Terror (1990)
- Young Indiana Jones and the Secret City (1990)
- Young Indiana Jones and the Princess of Peril (1991)
- Young Indiana Jones and the Gypsy Revenge (1991)
- Field of Death (1992)
- Trek of Doom (1992)
- Prisoner of War (1993)
- Young Indiana Jones and the Titanic Adventure (1993)

=== X-Files ===
- X Marks the Spot (1995) – novelization of the X-Files pilot episode from 1993
- Darkness Falls (1995) – novelization of the first season X-Files episode "Darkness Falls" from 1994
- Tiger, Tiger (1996) – novelization of the second season X-Files episode "Fearful Symmetry" from 1995
- Humbug (1996) – novelization of the second season X-Files episode "Humbug" from 1995
- Fear (1996) – novelization of the second season X-Files episode "Blood" from 1994.
- E. B. E. (1996) – novelization of the first season X-Files episode "E.B.E." from 1994
- Die, Bug, Die! (1997) – novelization of the third season X-Files episode "War of the Coprophages" from 1996
- Ghost in the Machine – novelization of the first season X-Files episode "Ghost in the Machine" from 1993
- Fresh Bones (1997) – novelization of the second season X-Files episode "Fresh Bones" from 1995
- The Host (1997) – novelization of the second season X-Files episode "The Host" from 1994
- Quarantine (1999) – novelization of the second season X-Files episode "F. Emasculata" from 1995

=== Other novelizations ===
- Blade Runner (1982) – photo-illustrated novelization based on the screenplay for the 1982 film
- The Bride: A Tale of Love and Doom (1985) – novelization of the 1985 film The Bride
- The Shadow (1994) – novelization of the 1994 film

=== Anthologies ===
All anthologies were edited under the name L. M. Schulman:

- Come Out the Wilderness (1965)
- Winners and Losers: An Anthology of Great Sports Fiction (1968)
- The Loners: Short Stories About the Young and Alienated (1970)
- The Cracked Looking Glass: Stories of Other Realities (1971)
- Travelers: Stories of Americans Abroad (1972)
- A Woman's Place: An Anthology of Short Stories (1974)
- Autumn Light: Illuminations of Age (1978)
- The Random House of Sports Stories (1990), illustrated by Thomas B. Allen
- Shakespeare's Life and World (2016), with Katherine Duncan-Jones
