= Hellbound (The X-Files) =

- The X-Files episode
- Ed's vision of a skinless Dr. Holland. The series' special effects team used over 200 prosthetic pieces, plus fake veins, to create the effect.
- Episode no.: Season 9 Episode 8
- Directed by: Kim Manners
- Written by: David Amann
- Production code: 9ABX04
- Original air date: January 27, 2002
- Running time: 44 minutes

Guest appearances
- Robert Beckwith as FBI Cadet; Katy Boyer as Dr. Lisa Holland; David Figlioli as Victor Dale Potts; James McDonnell as Detective Van Allen; Cyril O'Reilly as Ed Kelso; James Riker as Reborn Soul; Travis Riker as Reborn Soul; Don Swayze as Terrance Pruit; George D. Wallace as Dr. Bertram Mueller; Kari Kennell as Roxanne

Episode chronology
← Previous "John Doe"	Next → "Provenance"
- The X-Files season 9

"Hellbound" is the eighth episode of the ninth season of the American science fiction television series The X-Files. It originally aired on the Fox network on January 27, 2002. It was written by David Amann and directed by Kim Manners. The episode is a "monster-of-the-week" episode, a stand-alone plot which is unconnected to the series' wider mythology, or the overarching fictional history. The episode earned a Nielsen household rating of 5.1 and was viewed by 7.8 million viewers in its initial broadcast. It received positive reviews from television critics.

The show centers on FBI special agents who work on cases linked to the paranormal, called X-Files; this season focuses on the investigations of John Doggett (Robert Patrick), Monica Reyes (Annabeth Gish), and Dana Scully (Gillian Anderson). In this episode, Reyes takes the lead while investigating an X-File case surrounding a man found skinned alive. When she discovers that he had visions of a similar thing, she calls on Scully’s expertise to help with the investigation.

"Hellbound" was written to take Gish's character into a darker area. The episode's plot is similar to mythology surrounding the Aztec agriculture god Xipe Totec. To create the skinned human bodies, the makeup team sprayed a mannequin with layers of latex. The layers were then peeled off and positioned onto other mannequins that had been designed to resemble the actors. The faux skin was created to look "moist" and was composed of over 200 prosthetic pieces.

== Plot ==
In Novi, Virginia, a group of ex-convicts, led by Dr. Lisa Holland (Katy Boyer), meet and discuss atoning for their sins. Terry Pruit (Don Swayze) tells the others that, since he has discovered the group, he has made amends for his past. However, another member, Ed (Cyril O'Reilly), tells him that humans are unable to change and that they are both destined for hell. Ed's friend, Victor Potts (David Figlioli), tells Holland that he's been having nightmares involving people being skinned alive. That night, he has a vision of Ed skinned. Several hours later, Victor is murdered. Monica Reyes (Annabeth Gish) asks John Doggett (Robert Patrick) and Dana Scully (Gillian Anderson) to examine Potts' body. Reyes explains that, because Potts had a premonition of his own death, the case is an X-File. Meanwhile, at a butchery, Terry and Ed get into an argument. Terry later has a vision—similar to Victor's—in which Ed is skinned alive. That night, he is attacked and brutally flayed.

Reyes and Doggett arrive in Novi and talk to Detective Van Allen (James McDonnell), who seems apathetic about the case. At the same time, Scully contacts Dr. Bertram Mueller (George D. Wallace), a former medical examiner who autopsied several bodies in the 1960s that were skinned in a manner similar to Potts. Mueller tells Scully that the sheriff at the time did not pay much attention to the cases, emphasizing that there was more than one victim, and that he later killed himself. Reyes and Doggett receive news of Terry's attack and arrive at the local butchery to find him strung up among the pigs. While looking around the crime scene, Doggett discovers that Terry is still alive; Terry weakly says Ed's name. Doggett and the local police arrest Ed, who claims that he is innocent. Reyes believes him and admits that she too is having similar visions. Ed is freed, but not before having a vision in which Dr. Holland is skinned. In the meantime, Scully discovers that Potts and Terry were both born on the same day that two of the 1960s murder victims died.

Doggett, acting on Reyes' insistence that Ed is in danger, stakes out his house. Ed, however, is skinned regardless of Doggett's attempts to protect him. Reyes admits to Doggett that she is having flashes of the same premonitions that the victims are experiencing. She tells Doggett that Ed's body was gagged with a rag coated in coal dust from a mine, even though she has never seen his body. Reyes and Doggett head to the mine from which they believe the dust originated. Doggett finds the skeleton of a sheriff who killed himself in 1909.

Reyes finds newspaper clippings explaining the story: In 1868, a group of four miners murdered a man. The murderers' souls have been reincarnated several times since, only to be brutally skinned by the soul of the victim. In each case, the avenger is a prominent figure of the law.

Reyes soon stumbles onto the collected skin of the victims, but is attacked by Van Allen. Doggett eventually finds her unharmed. Reyes explains to Doggett that Van Allen is avenging his own murder and that all the murders that are linked to the case have been in groups of four. Reyes believes Van Allen takes his own life each time in order to restart the series of murders. Reyes frantically calls Holland, informing her that she is the fourth victim. Van Allen arrives at the church, but is stopped by Reyes. Later, Reyes muses to Scully that in the past, she had always failed to stop Van Allen's spirit, but may have succeeded in this life. The shot changes to Van Allen dying, only to be reincarnated into a newborn baby.

== Production ==
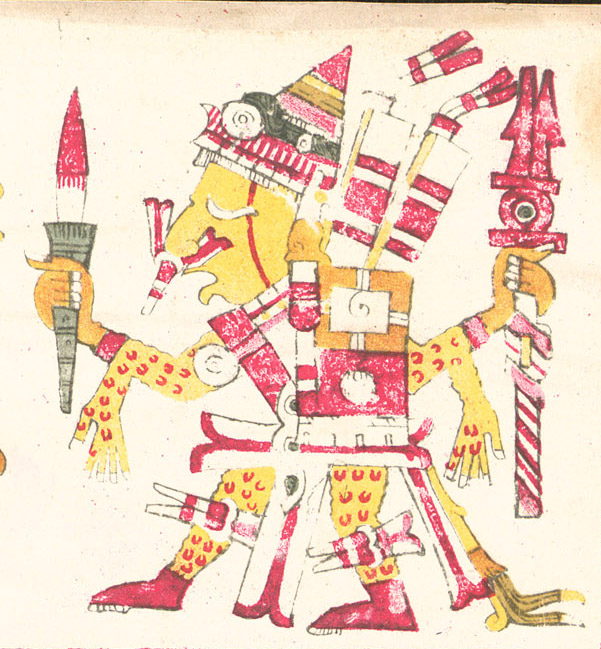
The episode's plot is similar to mythology surrounding the Aztec agriculture god Xipe Totec.

"Hellbound" was written by supervising producer David Amann and directed by Kim Manners. The episode was Amann's sixth episode written for the series, after season six's "Terms of Endearment" and "Agua Mala", season seven's "Rush" and "Chimera", and season eight's "Invocation". With this episode, executive producer Frank Spotnitz was interested in taking Annabeth Gish's character into a darker area. Executive producer John Shiban later explained that the episode—which deals with themes of "reincarnation and the idea of karmic justice"—revolved around Reyes questioning whether she was "a good person or a bad person? Did she fight evil, or did she let evil happen." It has been noted that the episode's plot is similar to mythology surrounding the Aztec agriculture god Xipe Totec. In mythology, Xipe Totec is often represented wearing flayed human skin, usually with the skin of the hands falling loosely from the wrists.

The production crew was tasked with building a refrigerated building the size of a warehouse for the slaughterhouse scenes. The crew rented an old dairy and decorated it with 300 slaughter pigs, supplemented by 200 additional rubber pigs. The skinned human bodies in the episode were created by spraying a mannequin with a layer of latex. The layer was then peeled off. Makeup technicians then took the "peeled skin" and positioned it onto other mannequins that had been designed to resemble the actors. According to Hurwitz and Knowles in the book The Complete X-Files, the effects were "a level of detail and sophistication never before seen on series television." The makeup staff worked quickly; according to Robert Patrick, the team "literally did a 36-hour day to pull off some of" the effects. The faux skin was created to look "moist" and was composed of over 200 prosthetic pieces. Fake veins were then overlaid on top of the skin. Makeup department head Cheri Montesanto-Medcalf later claimed that "seven makeup artists work[ed] seven hours on each person [for] ten days.

== Reception ==
=== Ratings ===
"Hellbound" originally aired in the United States on the Fox network on January 27, 2002, and was first broadcast in the United Kingdom on BBC One on January 5, 2003. The episode's initial broadcast was viewed by approximately 5.4 million households, (Note: At the time of airing, the estimated number of households was 105.5 million. Thus, 5.1 percent of 105.5 million is 5.4 million households.) and 7.7 million viewers, making it the seventy-first most watched episode of television that aired during the week ending January 27. "Hellbound" earned a Nielsen household rating of 5.1, meaning that it was seen by 5.1% of the nation's estimated households.

=== Reviews ===
"Hellbound" received generally positive reviews from critics. Jessica Morgan of Television Without Pity awarded the episode a "B". Robert Shearman and Lars Pearson, in their book Wanting to Believe: A Critical Guide to The X-Files, Millennium & The Lone Gunmen, rated the episode four stars out of five. The two wrote positively of the entry's plot—comparing it to the first season episode "Squeeze" and the fourth season episode "The Field Where I Died"—calling the writing "delightfully subtle". They praised Amann's misdirection, noting that the episode contains several red herrings. Shearman and Pearson also praised the episode's effects, calling the skinless bodies "the high point of the series' trading in gore". M.A. Crang, in his book Denying the Truth: Revisiting The X-Files after 9/11, called the episode "unexpectedly entertaining" and praised the script's attempts to shed more light on Reyes' character.

== Bibliography ==
- Fernández, Adela (1992). Dioses Prehispánicos de México (in Spanish). Mexico City: Panorama Editorial. ISBN 968-38-0306-7.
- Fraga, Erica (2010). LAX-Files: Behind the Scenes with the Los Angeles Cast and Crew. CreateSpace. ISBN 9781451503418.
- Hurwitz, Matt; Knowles, Chris (2008). The Complete X-Files. Insight Editions. ISBN 978-1933784809.
- Moctezuma, Eduardo Matos; Felipe Solis Olguín (2002). Aztecs. London: Royal Academy of Arts. ISBN 1-903973-22-8.
- Kessenich, Tom (2002). Examination: An Unauthorized Look at Seasons 6–9 of the X-Files. Trafford Publishing. ISBN 1553698126.
- Shearman, Robert; Pearson, Lars (2009). Wanting to Believe: A Critical Guide to The X-Files, Millennium & The Lone Gunmen. Mad Norwegian Press. ISBN 978-0975944691.

This article incorporates material derived from the "Hellbound" article on the X-Files wiki at Fandom (formerly Wikia) and is licensed under the Creative Commons Attribution-Share Alike 3.0 License (July 17, 2012).
