= Blood and Donuts =

- Directed by: Holly Dale
- Written by: Andrew Rai Berzins
- Produced by: Steve Hoban
- Starring: Gordon Currie; Justin Louis; Helene Clarkson; David Cronenberg
- Cinematography: Paul Sarossy
- Edited by: Stephan Fanfra; Brett Sullivan
- Music by: Nash the Slash
- Production companies: Daban Films; The Feature Film Project
- Distributed by: Live Entertainment
- Release date: 9 September 1995
- Running time: 89 minutes
- Country: Canada
- Language: English

Blood and Donuts is a 1995 Canadian supernatural comedy horror film directed by Holly Dale, written by Andrew Rai Berzins, and starring Gordon Currie and Helene Clarkson. David Cronenberg plays a cameo role as the local crime boss. The film features a vampire who is accidentally awakened after 25 years of sleep and starts to shyly make contact with the mortal world around him. As he interacts and begins to care for the people around him, he gets mixed up in their problems and they in his.

== Premise ==
A vampire named Boya is awakened from his sleep by a golf ball. He has not been awake since 1969, and marvels at his new surroundings. He does not feed on humans but instead on rats and animals. He meets up with a cab driver who is in trouble with some criminals, and a female donut shop worker who gets stuck in the middle.

Befriending them both, and slowly falling in love with Molly, they take on each other's problems. He tries to protect them, but also endangers them by drawing the attention of an ex-lover from decades past who has not stopped looking for him in 25 years.

== Cast ==
- Gordon Currie as Boya
- Justin Louis as Earl
- Helene Clarkson as Molly
- Fiona Reid as Rita
- Frank Moore as Pierce
- Hadley Kay as Axel
- David Cronenberg as Crime Boss
- J. Winston Carroll as Bernie
- Earl Pastko as Donut Shop Junkie

== Production ==
Blood and Donuts was the first film to be produced by the Canadian Film Centre, and it was director Holly Dale's first narrative film. Dale had previously made her reputation in documentary films. Fellow director Vincenzo Natali served as a stand-in for Cronenberg and also provided storyboards.

== Release ==
Blood and Donuts was released on home video on 4 October 1996.

== Reception ==
Brendan Kelly of Variety wrote that the film fails to deliver on its premise, as Dale has trouble combining the horror and comedy elements. In a retrospective of Canadian horror films, Variety later called the film "critically acclaimed".

=== Awards and nominations ===
Blood and Donuts was nominated in 1996 for the Genie Awards in 3 categories: Best Achievement in Costume Design (Emma England), Best Performance by an Actress in a Leading Role (Helene Clarkson), and Best Original Screenplay (Berzins).

== See also ==
- Vampire film
