= The X-Files (composition) =

1996 instrumental composition by Mark Snow

Single by Mark Snow

from the album The Truth and the Light: Music from the X-Files
- Released: 1996
- Length: 3:25
- Label: Warner Music; WEA International
- Songwriter: Mark Snow
- Producer: Mark Snow

Music video
- "The X-Files Theme Main Title (Materia Primoris)" Video on YouTube

"The X-Files" is an instrumental written and produced by American film and television composer Mark Snow. On its parent album, The Truth and the Light: Music from the X-Files (1996), the track is titled "Materia Primoris". It is a remixed version of the original theme Snow composed for the science fiction television series The X-Files in 1993. The composition was released as a single in 1996 and achieved chart success, particularly in France, where it reached number one on the SNEP Singles Chart. The composition has since been covered by many artists, including DJ Dado and Triple X; DJ Dado's version was a major hit in Europe while Triple X's version reached number two in Australia.

== Creation ==
The X-Files typically used more instrumental music than most hour-long dramas. According to the "Behind the Truth" segment on the Season 1 DVD, Mark Snow created the echo effect on his famous theme by accident. Snow said that he had gone through several revisions, but Chris Carter felt that something was not quite right. Carter walked out of the room and Snow put his hand and forearm on his keyboard in frustration. Snow said that "this sound was in the keyboard. And that was it."

The whistle melody comes from an old sample from the Proteus line of synth products called "Whistl'n Joe" and the whistling of Snow's wife, Glynn.

== Chart performance ==
The single debuted at number two on the UK Singles Chart on March 30, 1996, and stayed there for three weeks. In France, the single entered the chart at number 42 on April 6, 1996, and climbed to number two four weeks later. It remained for five weeks at this position, behind Robert Miles's hit "Children", then topped the chart for a sole week, becoming the second instrumental number-one hit on the French charts. It totaled 12 weeks in the top ten and 30 weeks in the top 50. The single re-charted in October 1998, but remained in the lower positions.

== Track listings ==
European and UK CD maxi-single; UK 12-inch single

1. "The X-Files" (original version) – 3:25
2. "The X-Files" (Terrestrial mix) – 4:20
3. "The X-Files" (P.M. Dawn remix) – 3:59

UK cassette single

1. "The X-Files" (original version) – 3:25
2. "The X-Files" (Terrestrial mix) – 4:20

German CD maxi-single

1. "The X-Files" (main theme) – 3:25
2. "The X-Files" (DJ Delicious remix) – 5:19
3. "The X-Files" (Ravers Nature remix) – 6:02

German 12-inch single

A1. "The X-Files" (DJ Delicious remix) – 5:19
B1. "The X-Files" (Ravers Nature remix) – 6:02
B2. "The X-Files" (main theme) – 3:25

French CD maxi-single and 12-inch single (remixes)

1. "The X-Files" (Secret Sessions extended mix) – 6:22
2. "The X-Files" (Secret Sessions radio edit) – 4:19
3. "The X-Files" (Map Mystery mix) – 5:27
4. "The X-Files" (Terrestrial mix) – 4:20

Australian CD maxi-single

1. "The X-Files" (main title)
2. "The X-Files" (Flexifinger Terrestrial mix)
3. "The X-Files" (P.M. Dawn remix)

Japanese 3-inch single

1. "The X-Files"
2. "The X-Files" (P.M. Dawn remix)

== Credits ==
- Composed by Mark Snow
- Terrestrial mix: remixed and produced Flexifinger
- P.M. Dawn remix: guitar by Cameron Greider, remixed by P.M. Dawn, synthesizers by Henry Hay and Maurice Luke, recorded and mixed by Michael Fossenkemper
- Ravers nature remix: produced and remixed by John Bogota, Pedro Ferrari and Roy Ströbel
- Secret Session remixes: produced by Special Agents for MAP Productions, engineered and mixed by RoBo
- Map Mystery mix: produced and mixed by Moorcroft and Prins for MAP Productions, engineered and programmed by TK for MAP Productions

== Charts ==
=== Weekly charts ===
Chart (1996)	Peak position
Australia (ARIA)	27
Belgium (Ultratop 50 Flanders)	19
Belgium (Ultratop 50 Wallonia)	7
Denmark (IFPI)	10
Europe (Eurochart Hot 100)	4
Finland (Suomen virallinen lista)	4
France (SNEP)	1
Germany (GfK)	8
Hungary (Mahasz)	3
Ireland (IRMA)	3
Israel (Israeli Singles Chart)	12
Netherlands (Dutch Top 40 Tipparade)	3
Netherlands (Single Top 100 Tipparade)	2
Scottish Singles Sales (Official Charts)	1
Sweden (Sverigetopplistan)	5
Switzerland (Schweizer Hitparade)	11
Taiwan (IFPI)	3
UK Singles (Official Charts)	2
UK Club Chart (Music Week)	63
US Dance Club Songs (Billboard)	45

=== Year-end charts ===
Chart (1996)	Position
Belgium (Ultratop 50 Flanders)	76
Belgium (Ultratop 50 Wallonia)	39
Europe (Eurochart Hot 100)	20
France (SNEP)	9
Germany (Media Control)	62
Sweden (Topplistan)	38
UK Singles (OCC)	25

== Certifications and sales ==
Region	Certification	Certified units/sales
France (SNEP)	Gold	250,000^{*}
United Kingdom (BPI)	Silver	200,000^{^}
^{*} Sales figures based on certification alone.^{^} Shipments figures based on certification alone.

== DJ Dado version ==
"X-Files"

Single by DJ Dado

from the album The Album
- Released: 1996
- Genre: Dream trance; dance; trance; house; techno; disco
- Length: 3:57
- Label: ZYX; Subway
- Songwriter: Mark Snow
- Producers: DJ Dado; Robert Gallo Salsotto

DJ Dado singles chronology
"Face It" (1995)	"X-Files" (1996)	"Metropolis - The Legend of Babel" (1996)

At the same time Snow's original version was experiencing chart success, Italian producer DJ Dado covered the song. His version became a top-10 hit in several countries, reaching number one in Denmark and Israel, and a top-20 hit in France and Germany. In the United States, this version was featured on the Pure Moods compilation album 1997 re-release.

=== Track listings ===
CD single

1. "X-Files" (DJ Dado paranormal activity mix) – 6:38
2. "X-Files" (Claudio Diva sub-dream activity mix) – 8:40

CD maxi

1. "X-Files" (radio edit) – 3:57
2. "X-Files" (DJ Dado paranormal activity mix) – 6:42
3. "X-Files" (Claudio Diva sub-dream paranormal activity mix) – 8:44

CD maxi

1. "X-Files" (radio edit) – 3:57
2. "X-Files" (DJ Dado paranormal activity mix) – 6:41
3. "X-Files" (Tom Wilson Dyme mix) – 6:38
4. "X-Files" (dV8 deviant mix) – 6:29
5. "X-Files" (freak bros area 51 mix) – 6:53
6. "X-Files" (Claudio Diva sub-dream paranormal activity mix) – 8:44

12-inch maxi

1. "X-Files" (DJ Dado paranormal activity mix) – 6:42
2. "X-Files" (Claudio Diva sub-dream paranormal activity mix) – 8:44

CD maxi – remixes

1. "X-Files" (2 Cowboys remix) – 5:07
2. "X-Files" (Reygroove remix) – 5:02
3. "X-Files" (Valez & L. Antolini remix) – 6:25
4. "X-Files" (Alex Voghi remix) – 6:25
5. "X-Files" (Miki B. remix – flute experience part I) – 8:38
6. "X-Files" (Moroldo & Mensi mix) – 4:35
7. "X-Files" (Hornbostel & M. Marvin remix) – 5:18
8. "X-Files" (Fabio Locati remix) – 6:18

=== Charts ===
==== Weekly charts ====
Chart (1996)	Peak position
Austria (Ö3 Austria Top 40)	4
Belgium (Ultratop 50 Flanders)	5
Belgium (Ultratop 50 Wallonia)	7
Denmark (IFPI)	1
Europe (Eurochart Hot 100)	6
Europe (European Dance Radio)	18
Finland (Suomen virallinen lista)	3
France (SNEP)	20
Germany (GfK)	19
Iceland (Íslenski Listinn Topp 40)	5
Ireland (IRMA)	5
Israel (Israeli Singles Chart)	1
Italy (Musica e dischi)	6
Scottish Singles Sales (Official Charts)	7
Sweden (Sverigetopplistan)	9
Switzerland (Schweizer Hitparade)	2
UK Singles (Official Charts)	8
UK Club Chart (Music Week)	50
UK Indie (Music Week)	1

==== Year-end charts ====
Chart (1996)	Position
Austria (Ö3 Austria Top 40)	14
Belgium (Ultratop 50 Flanders)	42
Belgium (Ultratop 50 Wallonia)	55
Europe (Eurochart Hot 100)	34
France (SNEP)	84
Israel (Israeli Singles Chart)	13
Sweden (Topplistan)	94
Switzerland (Schweizer Hitparade)	16

== Triple X version ==
The song was also covered by Triple X. This cover was less successful than the original version or DJ Dado's cover, but it did reach number two in Australia and was certified Gold by the Australian Recording Industry Association.

=== Charts ===
==== Weekly charts ====
Chart (1996)	Peak position
Australia (ARIA)	2
Belgium (Ultratop 50 Wallonia)	31
France (SNEP)	34
New Zealand (Recorded Music NZ)	39
Sweden (Sverigetopplistan)	24

==== Year-end charts ====
Chart (1996)	Position
Australia (ARIA)	11

=== Certifications ===
Region	Certification	Certified units/sales
Australia (ARIA)	Gold	35,000^{^}
^{^} Shipments figures based on certification alone.

== The X-Club version ==
"The X-Tended File"

Single by The X-Club
- A-side: "The X-Tended File 7-inch Mix"
- B-side: "The X-Tended File 12-inch Mix"
- Released: April 22, 1996 (Australia)
- Length: 3:55
- Label: Pro DJ International
- Songwriter: Mark Snow
- Producer: Clock

A version by the X-Club was released in Australasia in 1996.

=== Charts ===
Chart (1996)	Peak position
Australia (ARIA)	93

== The X-Files movie single and Mike Oldfield version ==
"The X-Files Theme"

Single by various artists

from the album The X-Files: The Album
- A-side: "Tubular X"
- B-side: "The X-Files Theme"; "The Source of Secrets"
- Released: June 8, 1998 (Japan)
- Length: 3:53
- Label: Twentieth-Century Fox
- Songwriters: Mark Snow; Mike Oldfield
- Producers: Mike Oldfield and others

Mike Oldfield singles chronology
"Women of Ireland" (1997)	"The X-Files Theme" (1998)	"Man in the Rain" (1998)

"The X-Files Theme" was released as a Japan only EP in 1998 from the soundtrack album The X-Files: The Album for The X-Files movie.

The maxi-CD includes four remixes of Mark Snow's theme to the television series, The X-Files. Notably "Tubular X" is part Snow's theme and consists of parts of Mike Oldfield's Tubular Bells. Another track from Oldfield also appears, "The Source of Secrets", the opening piece from his Tubular Bells III album, which also based upon the same theme from the original Tubular Bells.

=== Track listing ===
1. "Tubular X" – Mike Oldfield – 3:53
2. "The X-Files Theme" – The Dust Brothers – 3:27
3. "The X-Files Theme" – Satoshi Tomiie radio edit – 4:17
4. "The X-Files Theme" – R.H. Factor Pop radio edit – 3:37
5. "The Source of Secrets" – Mike Oldfield – 5:33
