= DJ Dado =

- Born: Flavio Daddato; January 6, 1967 (age 59)
- Origin: Milan, Italy
- Genres: Dream house, Italo dance
- Years active: 1994–2004

DJ Dado (born Flavio Daddato, 6 January 1967) is an Italian disc jockey and record producer who is mostly known for his remix of Mark Snow's theme for X-Files, and for covering Giorgio Moroder's "The Legend Of Babel". He produced dream house and italo dance music between 1994 and 2004, and has done many remixes for other artists such as Boy George, Jean-Michel Jarre, and Italian singer Alexia.

== Discography ==
=== Albums ===
- 1995: The Films Collection
- 1996: The Album
- 1998: Greatest Hits & Future Bits
- 1999: Greatest Themes '99

=== Singles ===
Year	Single	Peak chart positions											Album
Year	Single	ITA	AUT	BEL (Vl)	BEL (Wa)	FIN	FRA	GER	IRE	SWE	SWI	UK	Album
1993	"Peace & Unity" (with 2 System)	—	—	—	—	—	—	—	—	—	—	—	Singles only
1994	"The Same"	—	—	—	—	—	—	—	—	—	—	—	Singles only
1994	"Check It Up" (featuring Nando Vanelli)	—	—	—	—	—	—	—	—	—	—	—	Singles only
1995	"Face It"	—	—	—	—	—	—	—	—	—	—	100	Singles only
1996	"X-Files"	10	4	5	7	3	20	19	5	9	2	8	The Films Collection
1996	"Metropolis - The Legend of Babel"	8	—	—	—	13	—	97	—	—	16	—	The Films Collection
1996	"Mission Impossible"	24	—	—	—	—	—	—	—	—	—	—	The Films Collection
1996	"Dreaming"	—	—	—	—	—	—	—	—	—	—	—	The Films Collection
1996	"Revenge"	5	—	—	—	—	—	—	—	—	—	—	Singles only
1997	"Coming Back"	2	—	—	—	—	—	—	—	—	—	63	Singles only
1997	"Millennium" (with Dirty Mind)	—	—	—	—	—	—	—	—	—	—	—	Singles only
1997	"Shine On You Crazy Diamond" (DJ Dado presents DD Pink)	22	—	—	—	—	—	—	—	—	—	—	Singles only
1998	"Give Me Love" (vs. Michelle Weeks)	1	—	—	33	—	65	—	—	—	—	59	Singles only
1998	"Ready or Not" (with Simone Jay)	8	—	—	—	—	—	—	—	—	—	51	Singles only
1998	"Give Me Love, Part Two"	—	—	—	—	—	—	—	—	—	—	—	Singles only
1999	"Forever" (featuring Michelle Weeks)	12	—	—	—	—	—	—	—	—	—	—	Singles only
1999	"One & Only" (with Nina)	18	—	—	—	—	—	—	—	—	—	—	Singles only
2000	"Where Are You" (featuring Nu-B-Ja)	17	—	—	—	—	—	—	—	—	—	—	Singles only
2001	"You and Me" (featuring J. White)	42	—	—	—	—	—	—	—	—	—	—	Singles only
2002	"X-Files Theme 2002" (vs. Light)	—	—	—	—	—	—	—	—	—	—	—	Singles only
2004	"Theme from the Warriors" (featuring Dr. FeelX)	—	—	—	—	—	—	—	—	—	—	—	Singles only
2014	"No More Rain" (with Elettro Latino feat. Steph B.)	—	—	—	—	—	—	—	—	—	—	—	Singles only
"—" denotes releases that did not chart.

=== Remixes ===
- Imperio - Atlantis (DJ Dado mix)
- Vasco Rossi - Rewind (D.J. Dado Fm First Cut) " Remix – DJ Dado, Roberto Gallo Salsotto 1999"
