= Conduit (The X-Files) =

- The X-Files episode
- Episode no.: Season 1 Episode 4
- Directed by: Daniel Sackheim
- Written by: Alex Gansa; Howard Gordon
- Production code: 1X03
- Original air date: October 1, 1993
- Running time: 44 minutes

Guest appearances
- Carrie Snodgress as Darlene Morris; Michael Cavanaugh as Sheriff Jack Withers; Don Gibb as Kipp; Joel Palmer as Kevin Morris; Charles Cioffi as Scott Blevins; Shelley Owens as Tessa Sears; Taunya Dee as Ruby Morris

Episode chronology
← Previous "Squeeze"	Next → "The Jersey Devil"
- The X-Files season 1

"Conduit" is the fourth episode of the first season of the American science fiction television series The X-Files. The episode premiered on the Fox network on October 1, 1993. It was written by Alex Gansa and Howard Gordon, directed by Daniel Sackheim and featured a guest appearance by Carrie Snodgress as the mother of an abducted teenager.

The show centers on FBI agents Fox Mulder (David Duchovny) and Dana Scully (Gillian Anderson) who work on cases linked to the paranormal, called X-Files. In this episode, Mulder and Scully, when investigating the possible alien abduction of a teenage girl, find that the missing girl's younger brother may be capable of receiving satellite transmissions and that her mother was also party to a UFO encounter over twenty years earlier. Mulder finds himself becoming emotionally attached to the case due to its similarities to the childhood abduction of his younger sister Samantha.

The episode, although not directly tied to the series' ongoing story arcs, provides more information on how Mulder's sister had been abducted as a child, a plot thread which would go on to become one of the more prominent of the series. The episode was filmed in British Columbia, with Buntzen Lake being used as Lake Okobogee.

== Plot ==
At a campground at Lake Okobogee National Park in Sioux City, Iowa, Darlene Morris witnesses a flash of light outside her RV. She ventures outside to find her young son, Kevin, who claims that his teenaged sister, Ruby, has vanished.

In Washington, FBI Division Chief Scott Blevins informs Dana Scully that, unbeknownst to her, Fox Mulder has requested travel expenses to Sioux City based on a tabloid article about Ruby's disappearance. Blevins also shows Scully an X-File on the disappearance of Mulder's sister Samantha. When Scully asks Mulder about the travel expenses, he explains that Lake Okobogee was the scene of a series of UFO sightings in 1967; Darlene, then a member of a Girl Scout troop, was one of the witnesses.

When Mulder and Scully travel to Iowa and meet the Morrises, Mulder observes Kevin writing down binary code on a piece of paper; Kevin claims they are coming from static on a television screen. After submitting Kevin's code for analysis, the agents meet with the local sheriff, who tells them that Ruby was a juvenile delinquent who likely ran away. They also meet a young woman, Tessa, who says that Ruby had gotten pregnant and was planning to run away with her boyfriend, Greg Randall. The agents are unable to find Greg at the bar where he works; however, his boss tells them about UFO activity at Lake Okobogee.

Kevin's code is revealed to be part of a Defense Department satellite transmission. NSA agents ransack the Morris household, looking for any other material that might supposedly compromise national security. After the Morrises are taken into NSA custody, Mulder examines the charred roof of their RV, prompting him to head to Lake Okobogee. There, the agents discover sand turned to glass and a burned tree line, indicating the presence of a massive heat source. Upon encountering some white wolves, Mulder and Scully find Greg's body in a shallow grave.

On his person, Mulder and Scully find a note in Greg's wallet that eventually leads them to conclude that it was Tessa, not Ruby, who was pregnant. Under interrogation, Tessa confesses to killing Greg but denies Ruby was at Lake Okobogee that night. The agents return to the Morris' house, and, finding it deserted, discover the binary-covered pieces of paper laid out across the living room floor, forming an image of Ruby's face. Returning to Lake Okobogee, they find Darlene and Kevin in the nearby woods. A motorcycle gang appears, and as Mulder hurries to rescue Kevin from their wake, Scully discovers Ruby nearby.

Ruby is then seen in a hospital bed, with Kevin by her side. When questioned about her ordeal, she says she was told by an unnamed group not to say anything. Darlene also refuses to cooperate any further, given the ridicule that she faced after her past experiences. Back in Washington, Scully listens to a tape of hypnotic sessions in which Mulder recalls the night his sister vanished. Mulder, meanwhile, sits in a church, crying as he looks at a picture of his sister.

== Production ==
The episode was filmed in British Columbia, with Buntzen Lake being used as Lake Okobogee. Several crew members became lost in the surrounding area after the van responsible for installing signage got lost itself. The mural of Ruby made up of binary code was designed by assistant art director Greg Loewen and Vivien Nishi, who hand-wrote all the numbers on the mural.

Co-writer Howard Gordon said of the episode, "Alex [Gansa] and I made an effort to play to our own strength, which is character. We thought this was an interesting place to reiterate Mulder's quest for his sister. We set out to tell a simple abduction story, which was played out behind the shadows. We wanted to create an air of tension. With everything that happened, we wanted to explain what it could be. At every point, everything can be explained. Was she taken or killed by her boyfriend, who she was seeing against her mother's wishes? Is it Twin Peaks or an alien abduction? That was the theme of the show." Gordon and Gansa were afraid that series creator Chris Carter would not like the script, but Carter did and approved the episode they wrote.

Gordon praised the episode's ending, saying, "I think we're most proud of the ending: Mulder's quest is re-established (and Daniel Sackheim directed it beautifully) with Mulder sitting alone in a church with only his faith. The story, again, was fueled by Mulder's belief and emotional connection with this case. Another girl taken from her family. And, in a way, the little boy who is the conduit, who is also perhaps touched by the aliens, is essentially Mulder. These little touches the fans seem to respond to. It was difficult for us, but in the end satisfying. It came out of frustration on our parts, and creative uncertainty."

Producer Glen Morgan felt that Gordon and Gansa "have a better character-dramatic sense," adding that he believed the episode "really helped define Mulder." Carter felt the episode's highlights were the ending and the realization by Scully that Mulder may not be a crackpot, feeling it was very important to the show in establishing its point of view. He also felt that the episode proved effective at highlighting that the series was told from Scully's point of view, citing instances of the character "pulling Mulder back" from his fringe theories and emotional attachment.

The character Kevin Morris was played by actor Joel Palmer, who would appear in the series again in the second season episode "The Calusari."

== Broadcast and reception ==
"Conduit" premiered on the Fox network on October 1, 1993. The episode earned a Nielsen household rating of 6.3 with an 11 share—meaning that in the US, 6.3 percent of television-equipped households, and 11 percent of all households actively watching television, were watching the program. It was viewed by 5.9 million households.

In a retrospective of the first season in Entertainment Weekly, "Conduit" was rated a B, with the episode being described as "excellent for background" for the series, though it was noted that Duchovny gave "a performance that makes wood look lively." Keith Phipps, writing for The A.V. Club, reviewed the episode positively, rating it a B+, feeling that the episode worked well to expand on the motivations of the two lead characters, noting that "the work done here will pay off well later." The episode has been seen as laying the foundation for the recurrence of Fox Mulder's obsession with finding his missing sister, which would come to be one of the main plot threads of the series.

Duchovny's portrayal of Fox Mulder in this episode has been cited as an example of the character's reversal of traditional gender roles—his openness and vulnerability when dealing with the similarities between the Morris case and that of his sister casts him "in a pattern typically engendered as female." He represents a break from past archetypes, with his "emotional and empathic balance" providing a contrast to previous male detectives in fiction.

== Footnotes ==
=== References ===
- Bush, Michelle (2008). Myth-X. Lulu. ISBN 978-1-4357-4688-6.
- Edwards, Ted (1996). X-Files Confidential. Little, Brown and Company. ISBN 0-316-21808-1.
- Gradnitzer, Louisa; Pittson, Todd (1999). X Marks the Spot: On Location with The X-Files. Arsenal Pulp Press. ISBN 1-55152-066-4.
- Hurwitz, Matt; Knowles, Chris (2008). The Complete X-Files. Insight Editions. ISBN 978-1-933784-80-9.
- Lavery, David; Hague, Angela; Cartwright, Marla (1996). Deny All Knowledge: Reading The X-Files. Syracuse University Press. ISBN 0-8156-2717-3.
- Lovece, Frank (1996). The X-Files Declassified. Citadel Press. ISBN 0-8065-1745-X.
- Lowry, Brian (1995). The Truth is Out There: The Official Guide to the X-Files. Harper Prism. ISBN 0-06-105330-9.
- Malin, Brenton J (2005). American Masculinity under Clinton: Popular Media and the Nineties "Crisis of Masculinity". Peter Lang. ISBN 0-8204-6806-1.
