= Helene Clarkson =

Canadian actress

Helene Clarkson is a Canadian actress. She has most notably starred in the 1995 Canadian film, Blood and Donuts, earning a Genie Award nomination. She has also acted in several TV films, as well as in a 1995 episode of The X-Files, named "The Calusari".

== Awards and nominations ==
Year	Award	Category	Title of work	Result
1995	Genie Award	Best Performance by an Actress in a Leading Role	Blood and Donuts	Nominated
