= Darkness Falls (The X-Files) =

- The X-Files episode
- Episode no.: Season 1 Episode 20
- Directed by: Joe Napolitano
- Written by: Chris Carter
- Production code: 1X19
- Original air date: April 15, 1994
- Running time: 43 minutes

Guest appearances
- Jason Beghe as Larry Moore; Tom O'Rourke as Steve Humphreys; Titus Welliver as Doug Spinney

Episode chronology
← Previous "Shapes"	Next → "Tooms"
- The X-Files season 1

"Darkness Falls" is the twentieth episode of the first season of the American science fiction television series The X-Files, premiering on the Fox network on April 15, 1994. "Darkness Falls" was written by series creator Chris Carter and directed by Joe Napolitano. It featured guest appearances by Jason Beghe and Titus Welliver. The episode is a "Monster-of-the-Week" story, a stand-alone plot that is unconnected to the series' wider mythology. "Darkness Falls" earned a Nielsen household rating of 8.0, being watched by 7.5 million households in its initial broadcast, and received mostly positive reviews.

The show centers on FBI agents Fox Mulder (David Duchovny) and Dana Scully (Gillian Anderson) who work on cases linked to the paranormal, called X-Files. In this episode, Mulder and Scully are called in to investigate when a team of loggers disappear without a trace. Initially suspecting eco-terrorism, the agents find themselves trapped by a seemingly ancient menace lurking in the woods.

Carter was inspired to write this episode based on an interest in dendrochronology, a subject that involves analyzing annual growth rings found in non-tropical tree species. Carter credits the episode's ominous ending with his experience growing up in the era following the Watergate scandal, having spent his life coming to profoundly mistrust the government.

== Plot ==
In Olympic National Forest in Washington State, a group of loggers flee through the woods, trying to escape from an unseen force. They are eventually killed by a large swarm of small, glowing, green insects. Later, at FBI headquarters, Fox Mulder shows Dana Scully a photo of the missing loggers, telling her that another group of loggers disappeared in the forest in 1934. The two agents head to the forest, where they meet U.S. Forest Service employee Larry Moore and Steve Humphreys: head of security for the logging company. While driving through the forest, their truck hits caltrops left in the ground by eco-terrorists, forcing them to walk the rest of the way. Upon arriving at the camp site, Mulder and Scully find the cabins abandoned and the communication equipment destroyed. Searching the forest, they find a corpse encased in a large cocoon hanging from a tree.

While repairing one of the generators, Humphreys catches an eco-terrorist named Doug Spinney. He tells the group that there's a deadly swarm of insects in the forest and that they must avoid darkness to stay alive. The next morning, they find an old-growth tree cut down with an unexplained band of green contained within its growth rings. Spinney suspects that an organism that was dormant in the tree for centuries was disturbed when the tree was illegally cut down. Humphreys hikes down to Moore's truck but is killed by the swarm at nightfall. In the cabin, everyone else is kept safe by the light. The next morning, Spinney convinces Mulder to let him hike to his colleagues with gasoline so that he can return with a Jeep to pick them up. Scully and Moore confront Mulder, since this will leave them with little fuel for the generator.

The night passes with only a single lightbulb lighting the cabin, going out just as morning arrives. Mulder, Scully, and Moore hike down to the truck with a flat tire from camp, hoping to patch it, put on the spare, and escape. They find Humphreys's cocooned body. Spinney returns with the Jeep, telling the others that his friends are all dead. The Jeep hits another caltrop left in the ground, and Spinney is killed when he leaves the Jeep after dark. Moore and the agents are engulfed by the insects, which enter the vehicle through the air conditioning vents. They are found soon after and brought to a quarantined facility in Winthrop, Washington, where one of the scientists tells Mulder that the forest is being bombarded with pesticides and controlled fire in the hopes of eradicating the insects. Mulder asks the scientist what will happen if the efforts fail, but is simply told "that is not an option."

== Production ==
Series creator Chris Carter was inspired to write this episode based on an interest in dendrochronology, a subject that involves analyzing annual growth-rings found in non-tropical tree species, as he believed that trees that were "thousands of years old" might end up acting as "time capsules" that would shed light on past events or species. Carter also credits the episode's ominous ending with his experience growing up in the era following the Watergate scandal, having spent his life coming to profoundly mistrust the government. The green insects in this episode were primarily computer-generated and added in during the post-production process. The close-up shots of the bugs were done using microscopic photography of mites.

The episode was intended to be a bottle episode, meaning that it would be based in a single location to help save money, but bad weather plagued production, and it was one of the toughest episodes of the season for the crew. The episode was shot on-location in Lynn Valley, British Columbia in the Lower Seymour Conservation Reserve, known as the Seymour Demonstration Forest. The atmosphere amongst many of the crew had grown quite tense towards the end of the shooting schedule, and it culminated in a heated argument between director Joe Napolitano and first assistant director Vladimir Stefoff, after which Napolitano did not appear on-location again. "Darkness Falls" was the last episode of the series that Napolitano directed. The weather delayed production at the site so much that pick-up shots and inserts had to be filmed at a later date to finish the episode. Delays were also caused by the inaccessibility of the location, as only generators, camera equipment, and first-aid crew were able to stay on-site, and time was wasted commuting staff in each day. Jason Beghe, who played Ranger Larry Moore, was a childhood friend of David Duchovny and helped convince him to pursue an acting career. The camaraderie between the two actors is said to have helped lighten the mood during the episode's difficult production.

== Broadcast and reception ==
"Darkness Falls" premiered on the Fox network on April 15, 1994. This episode earned a Nielsen rating of 8.0 with a 14 share, meaning that roughly 8 percent of all television-equipped households and 14 percent of households watching television were tuned in to the episode. It was viewed by 7.5 million households.

In a retrospective of the first season in Entertainment Weekly, "Darkness Falls" was rated a B, with the episode being called an "eerie outing" set against a "torn-from-today's-headlines backdrop". Zack Handlen, writing for The A.V. Club, called "Darkness Falls" an "excellent" episode that "hits the right notes". He praised the episode's setting, comparing it to the earlier first-season episode "Ice", and felt that the "on-the-nose" approach to the environmental themes worked well. Matt Haigh, writing for Den of Geek, felt positively about the episode's ambiguous resolution, feeling that its "open-ended treatment" lent the episode "a real mysticism and strength" and finding that the episode held a sense of "weight, credibility, and intrigue". Writers for IGN named the episode their fifth-favorite standalone episode of the show, finding that it "boasts several interesting twists" and noting positively the episode's "smart" environmental themes.

Although Carter claims "Darkness Falls" was not written with an environmental message in mind, the episode was honored at the fourth annual Environmental Media Awards in 1994, winning in the "Television Episodic Drama" category. The plot for "Darkness Falls" was also adapted as a novel for young adults in 1995 by Les Martin.

== Footnotes ==
=== References ===
- Edwards, Ted (1996). X-Files Confidential. Little, Brown and Company. ISBN 0-316-21808-1.
- Gradnitzer, Louisa; Pittson, Todd (1999). X Marks the Spot: On Location with The X-Files. Arsenal Pulp Press. ISBN 1-55152-066-4.
- Lovece, Frank (1996). The X-Files Declassified. Citadel Press. ISBN 0-8065-1745-X.
- Lowry, Brian (1995). The Truth is Out There: The Official Guide to the X-Files. Harper Prism. ISBN 0-06-105330-9.
