= Kevin McNulty (actor) =

Canadian actor (born 1955)

- Born: December 8, 1955 (age 70); Penticton, British Columbia, Canada
- Education: Studio 58
- Occupation: Actor

Kevin McNulty (born December 8, 1955) is a Canadian actor best known for his roles in Ernest Goes to School, Timecop, Fantastic Four, John Tucker Must Die, Snakes on a Plane, Fantastic Four: Rise of the Silver Surfer, and as Mel Ivarson on the rural airline drama series Arctic Air. He is also known for his role as Farmer McDonough on the Apple TV+ musical comedy series Schmigadoon!.

== Biography ==
His appearance in science fiction films and television productions has been prolific. McNulty grew up in Rossland, British Columbia. He studied music and acting at Washington State University and graduated from Studio 58, Langara College in Vancouver, British Columbia. He put his acting skills to work first on stage, working for two years from 1984 to 1985 at the Stratford Festival. In 1986, McNulty made his break in screen work. Since that time, he continued on an extensive track of television and film work.

== Filmography ==
=== Film ===
Year	Title	Role	Notes
1988	Shoot to Kill	San Francisco Policeman	
1989	The First Season	John	
1990	Short Time	Dr. Drexler	
1990	Bird on a Wire	Brad	
1990	Narrow Margin	James Dahlbeck	
1992	Impolite	Weinfield	
1993	Anything for Love	Louis Calder	Video
1994	Ernest Goes to School	Axwell	
1994	Timecop	Jack Parker	
1994	The NeverEnding Story III	Barney Bux	
1994	Max	Dr. Flock	
1995	The War Between Us	Tom McIntyre	
1995	Live Bait	John MacIntosh	
1995	Gunfighter's Moon	Mayor Petersen	
1996	Mask of Death	Mickelson	
1996	Maternal Instincts	Dr. Joe Reilly	
1997	Kitchen Party	Brent	
1999	The Arrangement	Agent Dackhouse	
2001	Last Wedding	Rabbi	
2002	Greenmail	Albert Torsfeld	Video
2003	Stealing Sinatra	James Mahoney	
2004	Pursued	John Blakely	
2005	Fantastic Four	Jimmy O'Hoolihan	
2006	John Tucker Must Die	Basketball Coach	
2006	Snakes on a Plane	Emmett Bradley	
2007	Code Name: The Cleaner	Dr. Soames	
2007	The Invisible	Principal Whitcliff	
2007	Fantastic Four: Rise of the Silver Surfer	Jimmy O'Hoolihan	
2007	Nightwatching	Hendrick Uylenburgh	
2007	American Venus	Dick	
2008	Toxic Skies	Mayor Jim Tanner	
2009	The Uninvited	Sheriff Emery	
2009	The Seamstress	Collier Gatier	
2009	Excited	Bob	
2011	Donovan's Echo	Dean Belton	
2016	Interrogation	Eli Reed	
2023	She Talks to Strangers	Podcast narrator	
2025	R.L. Stine's Pumpkinhead	Farmer Palmer	

=== Television ===
Year	Title	Role	Notes
1986	Firefighter	Firefighter Stranan	Television film
1986	The Beachcombers	McNab	Episode: "Alekos"
1987	Stingray	Peters	Episode: "The Second Finest Man Who Ever Lived"
1987–1989	Wiseguy	O'Brien / Phil	Episodes: "New Blood", "Heir to the Throne"
1987–1991	21 Jump Street	Many	Guest roles
1988	Earth Star Voyager	Commander Gardiner	Disney Television film
1988	Laura Lansing Slept Here	Howard	Television film
1990	Danger Bay	Alan Marcus	Episode: "Listening In"
1990	Booker	Dr. James Brunswick	Episode: "Crazy"
1990	Bordertown	Mr. Parker	Episode: "The Pony Riders"
1990	Neon Rider	Joe / Bill Brenton	Episodes: "Over the Line", "Vengeance"
1991	Deadly Intentions... Again?	Dr. Uttley	Television film
1991	Palace Guard	Doggitt	Episode: "The Three-Minute Egg"
1991	Blackmail	Herb Grayson	Television film
1992	Diagnosis Murder: Diagnosis of a Murder	Foster	Television film
1992	Bill & Ted's Excellent Adventures	Falsey	Episode: "It's a Totally Wonderful Life"
1992–1995	The Commish	Wayne Tibbets / Captain Greg Burdage	Episodes: "Video Vigilante", "Brooklyn"
1992–1995	Highlander: The Series	Harry Dawes / David Markum	Episodes: "Revenge Is Sweet", "Reluctant Heroes"
1992–1993	Street Justice	Mr. Frank / Special Agent Simpson	Episodes: "Catcher", "Desperate"
1993	Liar, Liar: Between Father and Daughter	Reimer	Television film
1993	When a Stranger Calls Back	Dr. Schifrin	Television film
1993	For the Love of My Child: The Anissa Ayala Story	Dr. G. Thomas	Television film
1993	Final Appeal	Blankenship	Television film
1993	A Child Too Many	Daniel Hall	Television film
1993	Other Women's Children	Frank Blake	Television film
1993–1996	The X-Files	Agent Brian Fuller / Dr. Christopher Davey	Episodes: "Squeeze", "Soft Light", "Apocrypha"
1994	Snowbound: The Jim and Jennifer Stolpa Story	Joe Tirado	Television film
1994	Cobra	Sheriff Deak Macon	Episode: "Caged Fury"
1994	The Man Who Wouldn't Die	Curruthers	Television film
1994	Tears and Laughter: The Joan and Melissa Rivers Story	Gene	Television film
1994	M.A.N.T.I.S.	Fred Saxon	Episode: "First Steps"
1994	For the Love of Nancy	George Sabbath	Television film
1994	Cult Rescue	Travis	Television film
1994	Frostfire	Leonard Marquis	Television film
1995	Fighting for My Daughter	Sergeant Burnett	Television film
1995	Freefall: Flight 174	Larry Roberts	Television film
1995	The Marshal	Robert Steiner	Episode: "Hitwoman"
1995	Children of the Dust	Sheriff Harriman	Television miniseries
1995	The Other Mother	Edward	Television film
1995	Broken Trust	Judge Peatling	Television film
1995	When the Vows Break	Joe Rand	Television film
1995	Ebbie	Mr. Dobson	Television film
1995–2000	The Outer Limits	Dr. Leiberman / Everett Costello	Episodes: "The Message", "Judgment Day"
1996	Strange Luck	Ira Goldberg	Episode: "In Sickness and in Wealth"
1996	When Friendship Kills	Ted	Television film
1996	Generation X	Robert Ralston	Television film
1996	Abduction of Innocence	District Attorney Davis	Television film
1996	Two	Joe	Episode: "Armies of the Night"
1996	Titanic	Charles Lightoller	Television miniseries
1996	An Unexpected Family	Goldani	TV film
1996–1999	Viper	Metcalf / Jack Falvo	Episodes: "Die Laughing", "Hell Hath No Fury"
1997	A Child's Wish	Robbie	Television film
1997	Alibi	Attorney Hendricks	Television film
1997	The Adventures of Shirley Holmes	Reg Stebbings	Episode: "The Case of the Mystery Child"
1997	A Call to Remember	Michael Bratton	Television film
1997	Final Descent	Henry Gibbons	Television film
1997	Dead Man's Gun	Alastair Hodge	Episode: "Fortune Teller"
1997	Convictions	Marshall Link	Television film
1997	Tricks	Henry	Television film
1997–1999	Stargate SG-1	Dr. Warner	Episodes: "The Enemy Within", "Singularity", "Spirits", "Legacy"
1998	Shattered Hearts	Hal Baylor	Television film
1998	Silencing Mary	Tom Stuartson	Television film
1998	An Unexpected Life	Goldani	Television film
1998	Poltergeist: The Legacy	Paul Miller	Episode: "The Covenant"
1998	The Net	Judge Thomas Mayall	Episode: "Death of an Angel"
1998	In the Doghouse	Lee Goldberg	Television film
1998	The Color of Courage	Thompson	Television film
1998	Max Q	Oz Gilbert	Television film
1998	Noah	Donecker	Disney Television film
1999	First Wave	Ryan	Episode: "Deluge"
1999	Strange World	Menzes	Episode: "Lullaby"
1999	Millennium	Dr. Arnett	Episodes: "Darwin's Eye", "Via Dolorosa", "Goodbye to All That"
1999	Nothing Too Good for a Cowboy	Danny Doyle	Episode: "Float Like a Butterfly"
1999	Evolution's Child	Dr. Collard	Television film
2000	Trial by Fire	Warren Vaughn	Television film
2000	Navigating the Heart	Jack Stanton	Television film
2000	Secret Agent Man	Clive	Episode: "From Prima with Love"
2000	Miracle on the Mountain: The Kincaid Family Story	Dave	Television film
2000	Quarantine	John	Television film
2000	Seven Days	Clemons	Episode: "The Dunwych Madness"
2000	Special Delivery	Fred Anders	Television film
2001	Anatomy of a Hate Crime	Carl Manzani	Television film
2001	A Girl Thing	Peter	Television film
2001	Love and Treason	Director Horvath	Television film
2001	The Lone Gunmen	Wash	Episode: "Maximum Byers"
2001	Dark Angel	Gil	Episode: "I and I Am a Camera"
2001	Strange Frequency	Ross Van Horn	Episode: "Don't Stop Believing"
2001–2002	The Chris Isaak Show	Mr. Drubner	Episodes: "It's the Music, Stupid", "Our Place", "Just Us Kids"
2002	Andromeda	Cuatemoc	Episode: "Bunker Hill"
2002	Smallville	Mr. Summers	Episode: "Leech"
2002	L.A. Law: The Movie	Max Bettencart	Television film
2003	Just Cause	Hatcher	Episode: "Reasonable Doubts"
2003	Out of Order	Priest	Television miniseries
2003	A Date with Darkness: The Trial and Capture of Andrew Luster	Judge Riley	Television film
2003	Peacemakers	Charles Curry	Episode: "Dead to Rights"
2004	Family Sins	Kenneth Geck	Television film
2004	The Dead Zone	Dr. Scanlon	Episode: "Total Awareness"
2004	Cold Squad	David Andrews	Episode: "Girlfriend in a Closet"
2005	Reefer Madness	Mayor Harris MacDonald	Television film
2005	Supervolcano	Joe Foster	Television film
2005	Saving Milly	Sheldon Adler	Television film
2005	14 Hours	Larry Dastych	Television film
2005	Into the West	Thomas Fitzpatrick	Episode: "Dreams and Schemes"
2005–2006	Da Vinci's City Hall	James Dubreau	Guest role (season 1)
2005–2008	Robson Arms	Stanley Wasserman	Main role
2006	Stargate Atlantis	Chancellor Lycus	Episode: "Inferno"
2006	Augusta, Gone	Mr. Wallace	Television film
2006	The Collector	Father Derek Martin	Episode: "The Exorcist"
2006	The 4400	Christopher Dubov	Episode: "Gone: Part 2"
2006	Past Sins	Dale Beckman	Television film
2006	Firestorm: Last Stand at Yellowstone	Malcolm Levine	Television film
2006–2014	Supernatural	Reverend Roy Le Grange / Phillip	Episodes: "Faith", "Ask Jeeves"
2007	Anna's Storm	Tad Wingate	Television film
2007	Intelligence	Judd Walters	Episode: "Something in the Air"
2007	Tin Man	Hank	Television miniseries
2008	Love to Kill	Daniel Nash	Television film
2009	Kyle XY	Dr. Fieldman	Episode: "Life Support"
2009	Spectacular!	Uncle Sam	Television film
2009	Battlestar Galactica	Frank Porthos	Episodes: "Daybreak: Parts 1-3"
2009	Impact	Danny	Episode: "1.1"
2009	Do You Know Me?	Joe Prescott	Television film
2009	Psych	Chad Wiswall	Episode: "He Dead"
2009	The Good Wife	Cormac	Episode: "Pilot"
2009	Sight Unseen	Detective Mike Corland	Television film
2010	Meteor Storm	General Brock	Television film
2010	Life Unexpected	Richard	Episode: "Love Unexpected"
2011	Three Weeks, Three Kids	Russell Mills	Television film
2011	Endgame	A.C. Chase	Episode: "Huxley, We Have a Problem"
2012–2014	Arctic Air	Mel Ivarson	Main role
2014	Mom's Day Away	Don Holland	Television film
2015	Fatal Memories	Orly Chambers	Television film
2015	iZombie	The Magnificent Magnus	Episode: "Abra Cadaver"
2015	Wish Upon a Christmas	Mr. Tomte	Television film
2015–2016	The Man in the High Castle	Dr. Gerald Adler	Episodes: "End of the World", "Travelers"
2016	Tulips in Spring	Frank	Television film
2016	Unclaimed	Deputy Chief Quinn	Television film
2016	Travelers	Earl	Episode: "Hello 685"
2016	A Christmas to Remember	Dan Daniels	Television film
2016	The Magicians	Knight of Crowns	Episode: "Knight of Crowns"
2017	Daughter for Sale	Judge Smith	Television film
2017	Murdoch Mysteries	Robert Duncan	Episode: "Home for the Holidays"
2019	Unspeakable	Arthur	Television miniseries
2019	Bottled with Love	Earl Everson	Television film
2021	Yellowjackets	Mr. Taylor	Episode: "Saints"
2021–2023	Schmigadoon!	Farmer McDonough	5 episodes
2023	The Good Doctor	Dr. Sinclair	Episode: "The Good Boy"

== Awards and nominations ==
In 2013 McNulty was nominated for a Leo Award in the category of Best Lead Performance by a Male: Dramatic Series for his work on Arctic Air, episode "There's Gold In Them Thar Hills".
