= Humbug (The X-Files) =

- The X-Files episode
- Episode no.: Season 2 Episode 20
- Directed by: Kim Manners
- Written by: Darin Morgan
- Production code: 2X20
- Original air date: March 31, 1995
- Running time: 45 minutes

Guest appearances
- Jim Rose as Dr. Blockhead; Wayne Grace as Sheriff James Hamilton; Michael Anderson as Mr. Nutt; The Enigma as The Conundrum; Vincent Schiavelli as Lanny

Episode chronology
← Previous "Død Kalm"	Next → "The Calusari"
- The X-Files season 2

"Humbug" is the twentieth episode of the second season of American science fiction television series The X-Files. It was written by Darin Morgan and directed by Kim Manners. Morgan had previously appeared in a guest role as the Flukeman in an earlier episode of that season called "The Host". "Humbug" aired in the United States on March 31, 1995, on the Fox network. The episode is a "Monster-of-the-Week" story, unconnected to the series' wider mythology. "Humbug" earned a Nielsen household rating of 10.3, being watched by 9.8 million households in its initial broadcast. The episode received generally positive reviews and critics appreciated Morgan's unique writing style.

The show centers on FBI special agents Fox Mulder (David Duchovny) and Dana Scully (Gillian Anderson) who work on cases linked to the paranormal, called X-Files. In this episode, Mulder and Scully investigate a series of murders in a community of former circus sideshow performers. Mulder believes the murderer to be the mysterious "Fiji mermaid", which Scully argues is only a hoax—a mere humbug.

"Humbug" was the first explicitly comedic episode in the series, and Morgan would go on to contribute five more scripts that furthered his comic take on the show. According to critical analysis of the episode, "Humbug" explored themes of "Otherness" and difference. Guest stars included real-life sideshow performers Jim Rose and The Enigma of the Jim Rose Circus, as well as actors Michael J. Anderson and Vincent Schiavelli. "Humbug" was nominated for an Edgar Award and a Cinema Audio Society Award.

== Plot ==
In the town of Gibsonton, Florida, two brothers are playing in their outdoor swimming pool. A mysterious figure approaches them from the woods and jumps into the pool without their noticing. As the brothers play, they notice something is wrong. The figure emerges from the water; it's revealed to be the boys' father, a freak show act named the "Alligator Man", who scares his sons for fun. After the boys leave the pool for bed, their father stays behind to swim. Another mysterious figure approaches the pool from the woods. It attacks and kills the "Alligator Man" in his pool.

Agents Fox Mulder (David Duchovny) and Dana Scully (Gillian Anderson) travel to Gibsonton to investigate a 28-year series of attacks by an unknown assailant in a community of former freak show performers. They attend the funeral of the "Alligator Man" (who suffered from ichthyosis). Among the people they meet afterwards are "self-made freaks" Dr. Blockhead (Jim Rose) and his "geek" sidekick, The Conundrum (The Enigma), who will eat anything but says nothing. The agents also meet former performer Jim Jim, the "Dogface Boy", who later became the local sheriff after his face went through hair loss.

Mulder and Scully stay at the Gulf Breeze trailer court. Here, they meet the distrustful manager Mr. Nutt (Michael J. Anderson), a dwarf, and Lanny (Vincent Schiavelli), an alcoholic with an underdeveloped conjoined twin named Leonard. The agents hear a story about the legendary Fiji mermaid, a common sideshow act in the 19th century that generally turned out to be a monkey with a fish tail attached — the "humbug" referred to by the episode's title. Despite Scully's usual skepticism, Mulder is intrigued because of what look like simian tracks left by the mystery attacker.

One night, Mr. Nutt is fatally attacked by the creature, who the agents eventually discover is Lanny's twin, Leonard, who is able to detach himself from Lanny's body. According to Lanny, Leonard attacks people and attempts to burrow into them because he is looking for a new brother to replace Lanny, who is dying from liver failure. Lanny voluntarily locks himself in the local jail in an effort to keep Leonard from escaping, but dies during the night. Leonard slips through the bars on the cell window and flees. Mulder and Scully try to capture Leonard, who goes inside a funhouse, but he seemingly manages to get away.

Upon leaving the funhouse, the agents find The Conundrum lying on the ground, rubbing his stomach, apparently having been attacked by Leonard. As Dr. Blockhead prepares to leave town with The Conundrum the following morning, he comments to Scully that with modern science eradicating genetic anomalies, it will be up to self-made freaks like him to remind people that "nature abhors normality." The Conundrum looks unwell and Mulder asks what the matter is. The Conundrum — in his only line of the episode — replies, "Probably something I ate." As Dr. Blockhead drives away with The Conundrum, Mulder and Scully turn to each other with confused and somewhat shocked expressions.

== Production ==
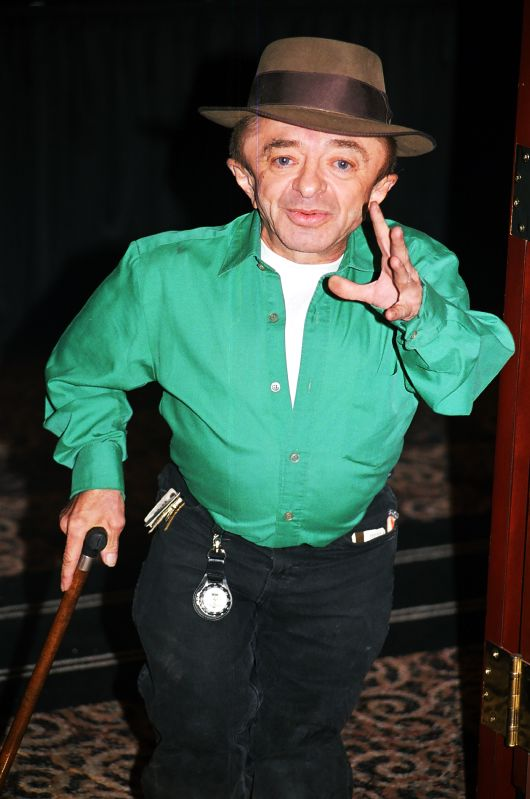
Twin Peaks regular Michael J. Anderson appeared in this episode as Mr. Nutt.

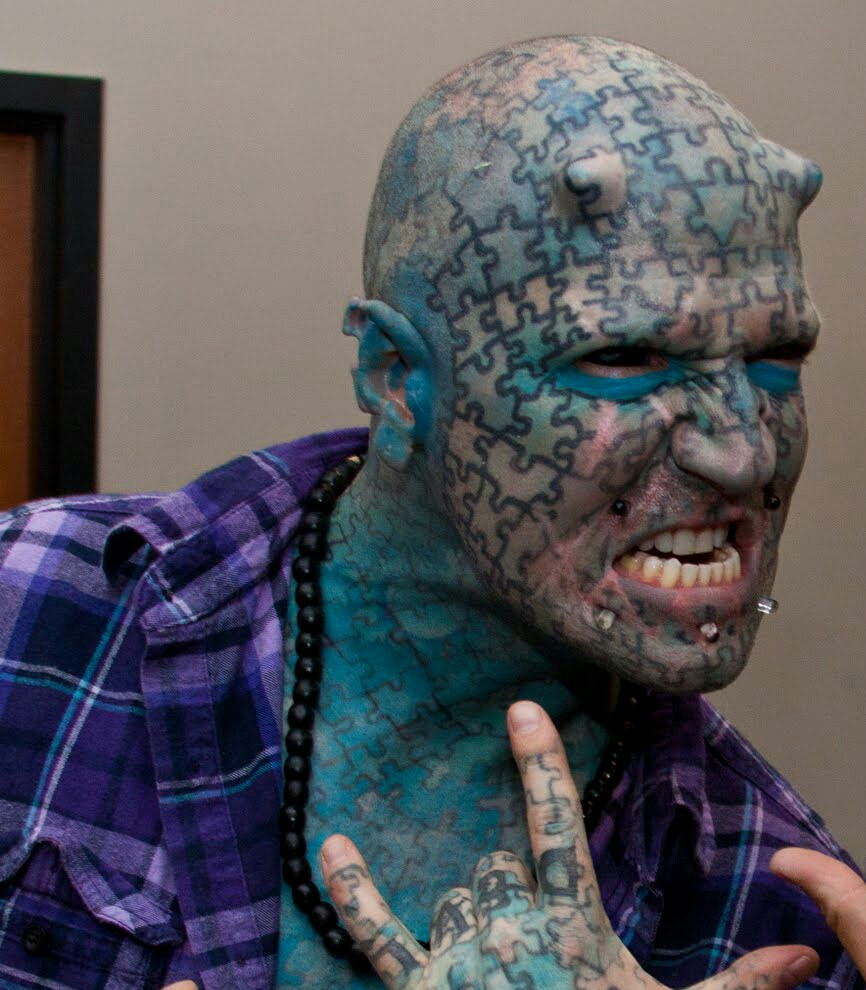
The Enigma appeared in the episode as The Conundrum.

"Humbug" was written by Darin Morgan; it was his first script for the series. Earlier in the second season, he appeared in the second episode "The Host" as the Flukeman. He also helped his brother Glen Morgan—already a regular writer on The X-Files—with the script for the third episode of the season, "Blood". Series creator Chris Carter offered Darin Morgan a permanent place on The X-Files writing team, which he reluctantly accepted. Morgan said he was uncomfortable initially, stating "One of the reasons I was uncomfortable joining the staff is that I'm a comedy writer and this isn't a comedy show, so I was trying more or less to have an episode with a little bit of humor, without telling anybody what I was doing." Glen suggested that he write an episode about sideshow performers. Before writing the episode Darin Morgan watched a tape of Jim Rose's circus sideshow and subsequently cast Rose and The Enigma as Dr. Blockhead and The Conundrum, respectively. Other guest stars were Twin Peaks regular Michael J. Anderson as Mr. Nutt and Vincent Schiavelli as Lanny.

Morgan's script turned out to be the most comedic episode of the series so far. The departure from The X-Files' usual style made some of the crew, including director Kim Manners, uncomfortable, and some of the more explicitly comic scenes were cut. After "Humbug", Morgan went on to write three more comedy-infused stories for the show: "Clyde Bruckman's Final Repose", "War of the Coprophages" and "Jose Chung's From Outer Space". David Duchovny later commented, "what I loved about his scripts was that he seemed to be trying to destroy the show." The plot for "Humbug" was also adapted as a novel for young adults in 1996 by Les Martin.

== Themes ==
In his 2002 book Strange TV, M. Keith Booker describes "Humbug" as an important episode in the show's "ironization" of its exploration of "Otherness"; from the start it challenges the characters'—and viewers'—assumptions about difference. In the teaser, what appears to be a monster is in fact a suburban father and eventual murder victim. When Mulder and Scully are quick to suspect the freak show performers of murder, Dr. Blockhead, a self-made freak and "postmodern celebration of difference", confronts their prejudice and bemoans a future with no genetic anomalies. The agents, with their conventional appearance are considered outsiders, and are quickly (and correctly) judged to be working for the FBI. According to Booker, the freak show characters from the episode exemplify the concept of the Other. He contrasts the perspective of "Humbug", which celebrates Otherness, with that of The X-Files overall in which "Other" is generally synonymous with danger and evil, much like Leonard. Despite this association between difference and malevolence generally found in The X-Files, the show meets the audience's need for difference and diversity, in its sheer number of strange and different characters. This need for something beyond everyday existence is mirrored by the main characters in Mulder's "wanting to believe" in the paranormal and Scully's Catholic faith. In "Humbug", this is highlighted by Dr. Blockhead's argument that the freaks add a richness to life that will be eliminated by genetic advancements.

According to Rhonda Wilcox and J. P. Williams in "What Do You Think? The X-Files, Liminality, and Gender Pleasure", "Humbug" is about "difference, sex, and looking". Regarding The X-Files as a whole, they say that the relationship between Mulder and Scully is non-sexual and "quasi-marital". Although sharing a degree of intimacy that allows them to share each other's space, they avoid a sexual or objectifying gaze: "They look into each other's eyes and argue ideas, rather than gazing at each other's bodies." This status quo is challenged in this episode as the objectifying gaze is highlighted and deconstructed, although not between the partners themselves. According to Wilcox and Williams, a key scene involves Agent Scully and Lanny. When Lanny goes to wake Scully in her trailer one morning, he catches a glimpse of her breasts; she inadvertently exposes herself as she in turn catches sight of Lanny's uncovered parasitic twin; "each gaze involves the objectification of difference". This objectification is emphasized by the fact that Scully's body is not normally revealed in this way.

== Reception ==
=== Ratings ===
"Humbug" was first broadcast in the United States on March 31, 1995, on the Fox network. In its original broadcast it was watched by 9.8 million households, according to the Nielsen ratings system. It received a 10.3 rating/18 share among viewers meaning that 10.3 percent of all households in the US, and 18 percent of all people watching television at the time, viewed the episode. The episode was nominated for an Edgar Award for 'Best Episode in a Television Series' and a Cinema Audio Society Award for 'Outstanding Achievement in Sound Mixing for a Series'.

=== Reviews ===
"Humbug" received praise from critics. In a 2010 review of the episode, The A.V. Club's Emily St. James gave it a "Grade A" rating. She noted the difference between the style of the episode and previous stories of the series, saying that at first, it "feel[s] like it might be a very special Murder, She Wrote or something," and that later, "we're clearly in some other show entirely, the only links in the continuity chain being Mulder and Scully themselves." Including Morgan's other scripts for the show, St. James called his writing "deeply, deeply funny", but said that "Humbug" "may be [his] weakest script". She particularly praised the ending of the episode, saying "there are few other TV writers that would come up with something as haunting and as perfectly understanding of the human condition as the final reveal of who the killer is." Also writing for The A.V. Club in 2010, Zack Handlen called it "a terrific episode ... well-written and odd". Ted Cox of the Daily Herald called "Humbug" "the pivotal episode of The X-Files." Robert Goodwin said of the episode "Talk about offbeat. It's very theatrical and grandiose. The trick was being careful that it didn't become like a bad Vincent Price movie, but it worked out well." Jessica Morgan of Television Without Pity gave the episode an A grade. Reviewers for website IGN named "Humbug" the tenth best standalone X-Files episode of the entire series. Topless Robot named it the sixth funniest episode of the series.

== Bibliography ==
- Booker, M. Keith (2002). Strange TV: Innovative Television Series From The Twilight Zone To The X-Files. Greenwood Publishing Group. ISBN 0-313-32373-9.
- Edwards, Ted (1997). X-Files Confidential: The Unauthorized X-Philes Compendium. Little, Brown and Company. ISBN 0-316-21808-1.
- Lovece, Frank (1996). The X-Files Declassified: The Unauthorized Guide. Citadel. ISBN 0-8065-1745-X.
- Lowry, Brian (1995). The Truth Is Out There: The Official Guide To The X-Files. HarperPrism. ISBN 0-06-105330-9.
- Martin, Les (1996). Humbug. HarperCollins. ISBN 0-06-440627-X.
- Wilcox, Rhonda; Williams, J. P. (1996). "What Do You Think? The X-Files, Liminality, and Gender Pleasure". In Lavery, David; Hague, Angela; Cartwright, Marla (eds.). Deny All Knowledge: Reading The X Files. Syracuse University Press. ISBN 0-8156-2717-3.
