= Soft Light (The X-Files) =

- The X-Files episode
- Episode no.: Season 2 Episode 23
- Directed by: James A. Contner
- Written by: Vince Gilligan
- Production code: 2X23
- Original air date: May 5, 1995
- Running time: 44 minutes

Guest appearances
- Tony Shalhoub as Dr. Chester Ray Banton; Kate Twa as Det. Kelly Ryan; Kevin McNulty as Dr. Christopher Davey; Steven Williams as X

Episode chronology
← Previous "F. Emasculata"	Next → "Our Town"
- The X-Files season 2

"Soft Light" is the twenty-third episode of the second season of the American science fiction television series The X-Files. It originally aired on the Fox network on May 5, 1995. It was written by Vince Gilligan and directed by James A. Contner. The episode is a "Monster-of-the-Week" story, unconnected to the series' wider mythology, although it marks the breakdown in relations between Mulder and his informant X. "Soft Light" received a Nielsen rating of 8.5 and was watched by 8.1 million households. The episode generally received mixed to positive reviews from television critics.

The show centers on FBI special agents Fox Mulder (David Duchovny) and Dana Scully (Gillian Anderson) who work on cases linked to the paranormal, called X-Files. In this episode, an ex-student of Scully's (Kate Twa) asks the agents to help her with her first investigation concerning a number of disappearances with very few clues. Mulder ponders the idea of spontaneous human combustion but rethinks it when they find a man, Chester Ray Banton (Tony Shalhoub), who is afraid of his own shadow. Banton is a scientist researching dark matter, and his shadow has somehow developed the ability to disintegrate people who come across it.

"Soft Light" was the first The X-Files episode written by Gilligan, who would go on to write several acclaimed episodes such as "Pusher", "Bad Blood" and "Memento Mori". "Soft Light" was one of the first episodes written by someone not on the main writing staff for The X-Files. Originally, the script called for Banton's shadow to be able to move independently, but it was rewritten to save on animation costs. In addition, the character of X (Steven Williams) was not in the script initially. His character was added to give Banton a legitimate fear of the government.

== Plot ==
At a hotel in Richmond, Virginia, Chester Ray Banton (Tony Shalhoub) reaches a room and frantically knocks on the door while shouting the name ″Morris″. Banton's shouts attract the attention of Patrick Newirth, a guest in the room across the hall. When Newirth looks through his door's peephole, Banton steps back, causing his shadow to slip beneath Newirth's door. Newirth suddenly evaporates, leaving a strange burn mark on the floor. Banton realizes what has happened and flees the scene.

The case of Newirth's death, the latest in several of its kind, is assigned to local detective Kelly Ryan (Kate Twa). She seeks help from Dana Scully (Gillian Anderson), her former instructor at the FBI Academy. Fox Mulder (David Duchovny) also takes part in the investigation, believing Newirth died from spontaneous human combustion. While searching the home of an earlier victim, the agents realize that both she and Newirth had recently traveled by train. Meanwhile, Banton sits in a train station, cautiously looking at the floor; because the room is lit by soft light, his shadow cannot be seen. After he leaves, Banton is confronted by two policemen patrolling the area. Despite Banton's warnings, the officers step into his shadow and disappear, leaving more burn marks.

The following day, while reviewing the station's surveillance tapes, Mulder sees footage of Banton staring at the floor. After blowing up the frame, Mulder sees the logo for a company called Polarity Magnetics on Banton's jacket. At Polarity Magnetics, the agents meet scientist Christopher Davey (Kevin McNulty), who identifies Banton, a physicist conducting research into dark matter. Davey reveals that Banton disappeared five weeks earlier after an incident in his laboratory in which he was locked in a target room with an active particle accelerator and exposed to a large amount of subatomic particles. His account is enough for Scully to consider spontaneous human combustion, but Mulder is now doubtful of this theory.

The agents find Banton at the train station, but he runs to a poorly lit area. He indicates that walking into his shadow will kill the agents, so Mulder shoots out the overhead lights. Banton allows himself to be taken to a mental hospital, where he is put in a room with soft light per his own request. He tells the agents that the accident in his lab caused his shadow to behave like a black hole, splitting atoms into component particles and reducing matter into pure energy. Banton claims that the deaths were all accidents, and that the government wants to exploit him. Ryan and her superior stop the questioning and declare the case closed, despite Mulder's objections. Mulder contacts X (Steven Williams), who assures him that the government has no interest in Banton. However, X and two associates later attempt to remove Banton from the hospital by cutting the power. In the process, X's associates are killed when the emergency lights turn on and Banton's shadow falls upon them. Banton flees from the hospital.

Banton returns to Polarity Magnetics and is confronted by Ryan, whom he reluctantly kills with his shadow when she tries to arrest him. Banton orders Davey to destroy him with the particle accelerator, but Davey reveals that he has been helping the government hunt him down. Davey locks Banton in with the particle accelerator, but is shot by X. Mulder and Scully arrive soon after, seemingly too late to save Banton from being vaporized by the accelerator; Mulder realizes that X has betrayed him, and tells X to never contact him again. The case is considered closed, but Mulder notes that Davey disappeared after the incidents. At a research facility, X watches as experiments are being performed on a despairing Banton.

== Production ==
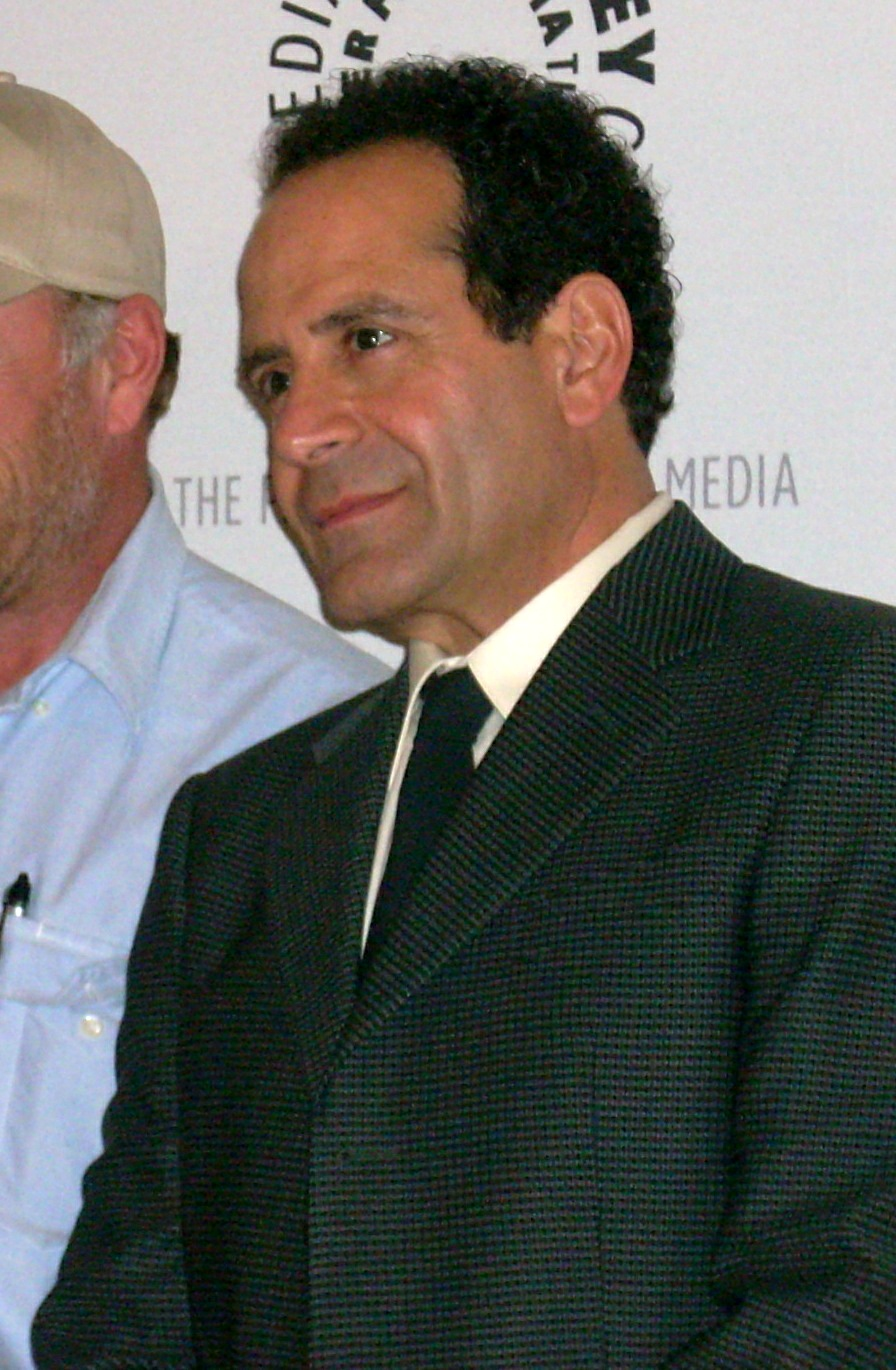
Tony Shalhoub guest starred in the episode as Dr. Banton.

"Soft Light" was written by Vince Gilligan and directed by James A. Contner. Prior to writing this episode, Gilligan, who was a fan of the show, learned that his agent was a relative of series creator Chris Carter. Thanks to this connection, he was allowed to meet Carter. During this meet, Carter asked Gilligan if he had any episode ideas, to which Gilligan quickly noted that he had been observing his shadow and thought it would be "creepy" if it began moving independently. Carter asked Gilligan to develop a script based on the idea as a freelance project (although when the episode was finished, Carter offered Gilligan a job as a permanent writer). This episode was thus one of the first episodes to be written by someone from outside the main writing staff of The X-Files.

Originally, the script called for Banton's shadow to be able to move independently; Carter and writer Howard Gordon rewrote the story to remove this aspect, which ended up "sav[ing] an enormous amount of money in animation costs", according to Gilligan. After reading the first draft, Carter also felt that Banton's fear of having the government control him should be "more than just paranoia". He thus wrote X into the story; writer Frank Spotnitz later noted, "It had been a long time since X had done anything and the character really needed to grow." Gilligan himself inserted a reference to the villain Eugene Victor Tooms from the first-season episodes "Squeeze" and "Tooms" in a conversation between Ryan and Mulder.

The episode guest stars Tony Shalhoub as Dr. Banton. Shalhoub, who had a recurring role on the NBC series Wings, was not familiar with The X-Files when he was offered the part because at the time he did not watch much television. However, after reading the script for "Soft Light", he enjoyed the story due to its The Twilight Zone-esque nature. When Shalhoub informed people that he had secured a part in The X-Files, he claimed that "the response was unbelievable". Shalhoub was impressed with the on-location filming that the series did; he noted, "Ninety-nine percent of our filming on Wings is done on a soundstage, while most of [The X-Files] is shot on location in and around Vancouver. It's an ideal city because it gives producers so many options."

Both the Pacific Central Station and the Pacific Marine Training Institute in Vancouver stood in for the train station featured in the episode. Initially, the Pacific Marine Training Institute would only give the series permission to film after 5pm, but the show's producers eventually talked the dean of the station into letting production begin at 2 in the afternoon. Because he was a fan of the series, Gilligan traveled to Vancouver and video recorded the filming of "Soft Light".

== Broadcast and reception ==
"Soft Light" was originally aired in the United States on the Fox Broadcasting Company on May 5, 1995. In its original broadcast, it was watched by 8.1 million households, according to the Nielsen ratings system. It received an 8.5 rating and 15 share among viewers, meaning that 8.5 percent of all households in the United States and 15 percent of all people watching television at the time, viewed the episode.

"Soft Light" received mixed to positive reviews from television critics. Entertainment Weekly gave the episode a "B−" and noted that the episode "gains points for the obscure subject matter" but "loses them for the strained conspiratorial element". Zack Handlen of The A.V. Club also gave it a "B−". He praised the cold open for its strangeness and X's involvement, but thought that the explanation for Banton's shadow was not satisfactorily fleshed out. Robert Shearman, in his book Wanting to Believe: A Critical Guide to The X-Files, Millennium & The Lone Gunmen, rated the episode four stars out of five. Writing positively of the episode's focal case, Shearman called the set-up one wherein "Mulder and Scully get to investigate properly, coming up with theories that they later build on or retract." Shearman also wrote positively of the episode's conclusion, noting that "there's no better illustration for distrusting the government than the brilliant closing scene" which features Shalhoub "fixed to a chair, bombarded with flashes of light, as one single tear rolls down his terrified face."

Critic A.J. Black compared Banton to Vince Gilligan's later creations, such as Walter White from Breaking Bad and Saul Goodman in Better Call Saul: "Banton feels, intriguingly for Gilligan’s first X-File, like the end of the writer’s exploratory road, certainly in the kind of tragic masculine figure he is so fascinated by. Banton is exhausted, worn out, paranoid and anxious about anyone who gets too close to him. “Please, I’m warning you! I’m a dangerous man!” He feels more equivalent to Walter or Jimmy/Saul (the latter, perhaps, in his future guise as the broken Gene Takavic) at the point they have lost their souls."

== Bibliography ==
- Edwards, Ted (1996). X-Files Confidential. Little, Brown and Company. ISBN 0-316-21808-1.
- Hurwitz, Matt & Knowles, Chris (2008). The Complete X-Files: Behind the Series the Myths and the Movies. New York, US: Insight Editions. ISBN 978-1-933784-72-4.
- Lowry, Brian (1995). The Truth is Out There: The Official Guide to the X-Files. Harper Prism. ISBN 0-06-105330-9.
- Shearman, Robert (2009). Wanting to Believe: A Critical Guide to The X-Files, Millennium & The Lone Gunmen. Mad Norwegian Press. ISBN 978-0-9759446-9-1.
