= Squeeze (The X-Files) =

- The X-Files episode
- Tooms squeezing himself through a chimney.
- Episode no.: Season 1 Episode 3
- Directed by: Harry Longstreet
- Written by: Glen Morgan; James Wong
- Production code: 1X02
- Original air date: September 24, 1993
- Running time: 42 minutes

Guest appearances
- Doug Hutchison as Eugene Victor Tooms; Donal Logue as Tom Colton; Henry Beckman as Detective Frank Briggs; Kevin McNulty as Agent Fuller

Episode chronology
← Previous "Deep Throat"	Next → "Conduit"
- The X-Files season 1

"Squeeze" is the third episode of the first season of the American science fiction television series The X-Files. It premiered on the Fox network on September 24, 1993. "Squeeze" was written by Glen Morgan and James Wong and directed by Harry Longstreet, with Michael Katleman directing additional footage. The episode featured the first of two guest appearances by Doug Hutchison as the mutant serial killer Eugene Victor Tooms, a role he reprised in the 1994 episode "Tooms". "Squeeze" was the first "monster-of-the-week" episode of The X-Files, unconnected to the series' overarching mythology.

In the episode, the FBI agents Fox Mulder (David Duchovny) and Dana Scully (Gillian Anderson) investigate a series of ritualistic killings by somebody seemingly capable of squeezing his body through impossibly narrow spaces. The agents deduce that their suspect may be a genetic mutant who has been killing in sprees for at least ninety years.

The production of "Squeeze" was problematic; creative differences between Longstreet and the crew led to him being replaced as director, while some missing scenes needed to be shot after the initial filming. Because of these issues, the completion of the episode relied on post-production techniques. However, "Squeeze" has received positive reviews from critics and the episode has since been described as "the episode that really sold The X-Files idea to the masses." Academics have examined "Squeeze" for its portrayal of the politics of law enforcement, highlighting the tension—evident throughout the series—between the agents' desire to find the truth and their duty to secure criminal convictions.

== Plot ==
In Baltimore, businessman George Usher arrives at his office building. He is watched from a storm drain by someone who then infiltrates the building by climbing through the elevator shaft into the ventilation system, kills Usher and removes his liver.

Usher's murder, the latest of three, is assigned to careerist FBI agent Tom Colton (Donal Logue), who turns to Dana Scully (Gillian Anderson) for help. Colton is baffled by the lack of entry points at the crime scenes and by the apparent removal of the livers with bare hands. Fox Mulder (David Duchovny) notes their similarity to earlier murder sprees from 1933 and 1963. At the scene, he notices an elongated fingerprint on the air vent, which he finds to be similar to some documented in the X-Files. He concludes that because five murders occurred during the earlier sprees, the investigators should expect two more.

Because Scully believes that the killer will return to the scenes of his earlier crimes, she and Mulder wait in the parking garage of the office building. There, they catch a man named Eugene Victor Tooms (Doug Hutchison) climbing through the air vents. Tooms is given a polygraph test, which includes questions written by Mulder linking him to murders dating as far back as 1903. Tooms passes most of the test, but crucially fails Mulder's questions placing Tooms at the historical murders. However, Colton dismisses Mulder's queries and lets Tooms go. To prove his assertion to Scully, Mulder digitally elongates and narrows Tooms' fingerprints, showing that they match the prints at the crime scene. He believes that Tooms is able to stretch and squeeze his body through narrow spaces. That night, Tooms demonstrates this ability by squeezing down a chimney to claim another victim.

Mulder and Scully find no documentation on Tooms' life. They visit retired detective Frank Briggs (Henry Beckman), who recounts his investigation into the 1933 murders. Briggs brings out old photographs of Tooms—who has not aged in sixty years—and gives them the address of Tooms' former apartment building. There, Mulder and Scully find a "nest" constructed out of newspaper and bile in the building's crawl space, as well as several trophy items taken from past victims. Mulder suspects that Tooms is a mutant who can hibernate for thirty years at a time after consuming five human livers. As the two leave, Tooms, who is hiding in the rafters, stealthily takes the necklace Scully is wearing as a new trophy.

Mulder and Scully put Tooms' apartment under surveillance, but Colton has them taken off the job. Mulder finds Scully's necklace inside the apartment and tries to call his partner, but her phone line has been cut. Tooms breaks into Scully's apartment through a tiny air vent to kill her, but Mulder rushes there and apprehends him first. Tooms is institutionalized and begins to build another nest using newspaper. Scully informs Mulder that medical tests on Tooms show an abnormal skeletal and muscle system, and a rapidly declining metabolism. When Tooms is given food through a slot in the door, he stares at the thin slot and grins.

== Production ==
=== Pre-production ===
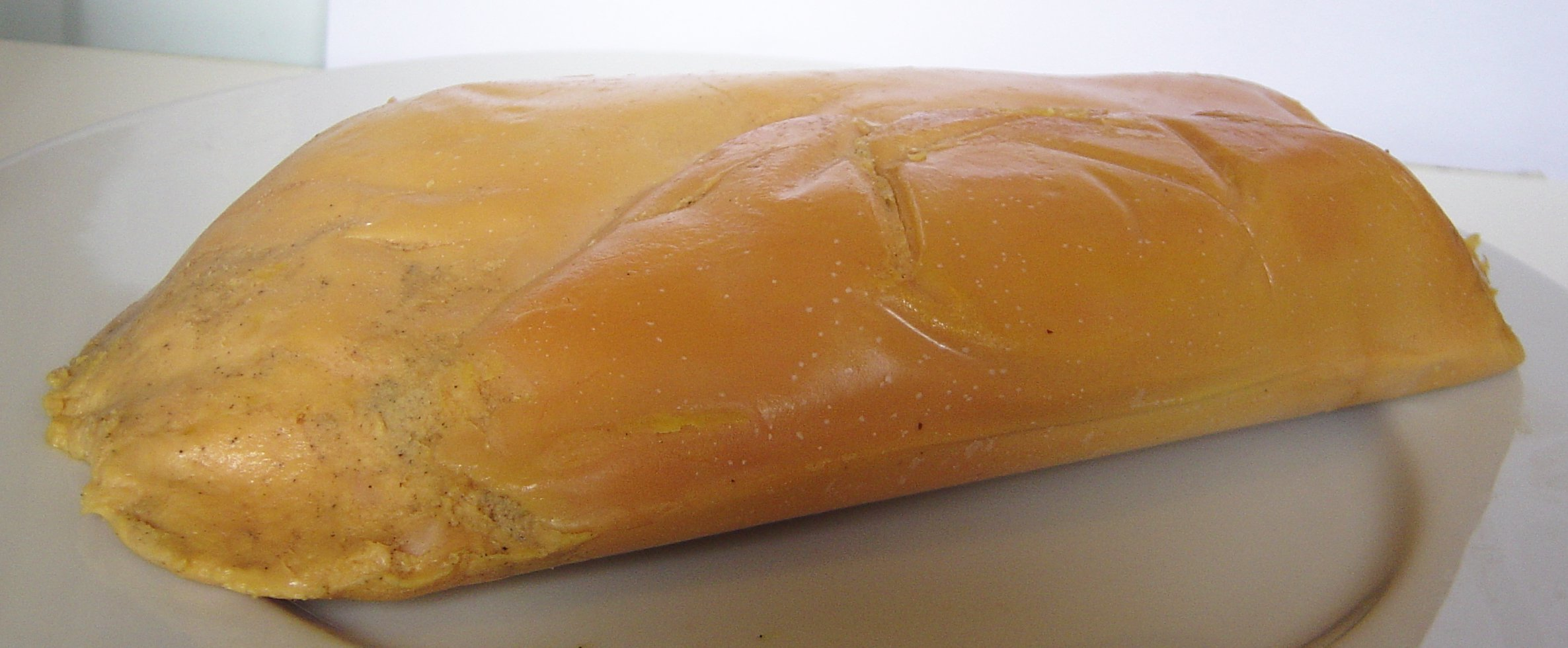
Series creator Chris Carter suggested that Tooms eat human livers after tasting foie gras, the liver of a fattened goose.

Coming after two episodes focused on the series' "mythology", or fictional history, "Squeeze" helped establish that the show could cover other paranormal subjects and was the series' first "monster-of-the-week" episode. Series creator Chris Carter thought that the show could not sustain its momentum unless it branched out from the previously UFO-centered plots. Co-writers Glen Morgan and James Wong were inspired to write the episode when they looked at a ventilation shaft outside of their office and thought about whether someone could crawl inside it. Although the episode has parallels with the second Kolchak film, The Night Strangler (1973), which featured a man who commits murders every 21 years, Morgan and Wong have stated they were inspired by the serial killers Jack the Ripper and Richard Ramirez.

After eating foie gras during a trip to France, Carter proposed the idea that the villain should consume human livers. Morgan noted that the writers settled on the liver because it was "funnier" than any other organ. The idea to have Tooms use a nest for hibernation came from Morgan and Wong; they liked that if the agents were unable to catch Tooms, he could return after weeks of dormancy.

Actor Doug Hutchison was aged 33 when he auditioned for the part of Tooms, but the producers initially considered him too young for the role; Morgan thought that Hutchison "looks twelve years old." However, Hutchison impressed the writers with his ability to suddenly transition into aggressive behavior, which convinced them to hire him. He related that his portrayal of Tooms was inspired by the "stillness" of Anthony Hopkins' acting in The Silence of the Lambs (1991).

=== Filming ===
You must put the camera in certain places to scare people, and you must not put the camera in other places, because you will not scare them. There were many re-shoots. There was a lot of editorial wizardry by Heather McDougall. And there was Jim and Glen, who worked on it tirelessly to make it right.

— Carter on the episode's filming.

The episode's establishing exterior shots, and those of Tooms' apartment, were filmed around Hastings Street in Vancouver. When filming the first shot of Tooms' eyes glowing from a storm drain, the production crew arrived too late to secure the street for filming and a nearby construction crew were temporarily drafted to guard the area. The ventilation system through which the first victim is attacked at night was meant to be of a parking garage. However, to avoid a costly tenting operation to simulate night-time, a replica of the necessary parts of the ventilation system was built in a lower level of the parking garage. Exterior shots of Scully's apartment were also filmed in Vancouver, at the same location used in the pilot episode. However, this location's use was later discontinued owing to the limited range of shots it afforded; most reverse angles would show a large parking lot across the street.

Wong was disappointed with director Harry Longstreet, claiming he did not have respect for the script. Longstreet had failed to film one of the script's scenes, and had not obtained additional camera coverage for the scenes which had been filmed. As a result, Wong and another director, Michael Katleman, re-shot several scenes for additional coverage to complete the episode, and filmed the omitted scene and some inserts. Morgan said that the episode's production was problematic, feeling that "Squeeze" "was truly saved in post-production." Hutchison and Duchovny both had difficulty with Longstreet's directing, with Hutchison finding his acting instructions "ridiculous." Duchovny disagreed with the director's take on how Mulder should be portrayed, noting, "The director wanted me to be mad about this horrible serial killer. I was like, 'No, this is an amazing discovery! He's not morally culpable, because he's genetically driven.' I judge no one."

=== Post-production ===
For the shot in which Tooms slides through a chimney, the producers hired a contortionist who could squeeze through small spaces. They filmed the shot with the camera standing below the contortionist. The chimney, which was "more like a belt than a pipe," was made to look much narrower than it actually was. Using computer-generated imagery, they were able to produce and elongate shots of the contortionist's fingers. Producer R. W. Goodwin believed that the contortionist—known only as "Pepper"—would only have limited success in fitting down the chimney set and would work mostly as a photo double. However, he was able to fit entirely inside the chimney; the production crew only needed to add some sound effects "of bones snapping and cracking."

The scene in which Tooms enters Scully's home was initially filmed in Hutchison's absence. The crew shot his entrance later, using a larger blue screen set. These shots were digitally merged so that Tooms would appear to emerge from a much smaller hatch than was filmed. The effect was kept to a minimum; Hutchison's footage was not "squeezed" too much, as both Carter and visual effects supervisor Mat Beck have stated their belief that "less is more: just a hint of the supernatural is all that is required."

== Themes ==
Although it did not directly affect the ongoing storyline of The X-Files, "Squeeze" introduced key thematic elements to the series. It has been described as "the episode where Dana Scully must publicly pick a side." She had previously confronted military officials in "Deep Throat," and has "carefully worded" her reports to protect Mulder from ridicule, but an encounter with former colleague Tom Colton forces her to openly choose between Mulder and the politics of careerism. These developments with Colton "[tether] another thread between her career and the rest of the FBI," highlighting a sense of "exasperation and derision" from her colleagues, whose mindsets represent "institutionally acceptable" models of reality.

This hostility suggests that the series' problems are "not epistemological; they are political"—the agents, Scully in particular, has to balance a search for "the truth" with the need to secure criminal convictions in their cases. This balancing act "between investigating to discover the truth and gathering evidence to support a court case" has been compared to the perceived stance of the FBI during the series' tenure. The Bureau had at this time seen itself as a law enforcement agency responsible for amassing evidence to prosecute criminal cases. There is a disparity between this approach and public perception of the FBI's role as an organization investigating an objective and apolitical truth; this led to public frustration "because [people] incorrectly believe that a courtroom is designed to discover the truth."

== Broadcast and reception ==
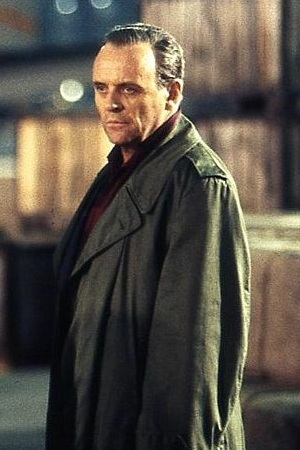
Guest star Doug Hutchison based his critically acclaimed portrayal of Tooms on Anthony Hopkins (pictured) in The Silence of the Lambs.

"Squeeze" premiered on the Fox network on September 24, 1993. The episode's initial broadcast was viewed by approximately 6.8 million households and 11.1 million viewers. "Squeeze" earned a Nielsen rating of 7.2, with a 13 share, meaning that roughly 7.2 percent of all television-equipped households, and 13 percent of households watching television, were tuned in to the episode.

Morgan was very pleased with Hutchison's performance, describing him as an "ace in the hole" and calling his work "outstanding." He went on to write "Tooms", another first season episode in which the character returns. The Vince Gilligan-penned second season episode "Soft Light" would also make reference to the character. Hutchison wrote a prequel titled "Dark He Was and Golden-Eyed" and sent it to Carter, but the script was returned unread for legal reasons.

"Squeeze" has been described as the first episode of The X-Files to branch out into horror, which came to be one of the defining genres of the series. The plot was adapted as a novel for young adults in 1996 by Ellen Steiber. The episode also inspired "Folding Man," a first season episode of the television series Sanctuary.

In Entertainment Weekly's 1996 retrospective of the first season, "Squeeze" was rated B+; it was called "an important episode," and Hutchison's portrayal of Tooms was described as "profoundly creepy." However, Thomas Sutcliffe of The Independent was more critical, deriding the premise in a 1994 review, as "entirely ludicrous," and sarcastically described Mulder's deduction of Tooms' abilities as "clearly another triumph for the deductive method." A 2008 article in the Vancouver Sun listed "Squeeze" as one of the best stand-alone episodes of the show, saying, "The X-Files became known for its creepy, monster-of-the-week episodes, and Squeeze was the one that started it all," and that, together with "Tooms", it "remains one of the scariest things ever seen on television."

Keith Phipps, writing for The A.V. Club in 2008, praised the episode, rated it an A−, and described Hutchison's role as "the part that would launch [him] as a go-to character actor for creep parts." Phipps felt the climactic scene in which Tooms infiltrates Scully's home is "the scene that makes the episode," noting that there was "a real sense of peril" despite it being clear that Scully, a lead character, was not going to come to harm. Robert Shearman, in his book Wanting to Believe: A Critical Guide to The X-Files, Millennium & The Lone Gunmen, notes that the episode's premise is the first in the series "not to rely upon accepted urban legends." It conveys its "absurd" plot through suggestion, leaving any special-effects sequences of Tooms' abilities until the audience is "already suitably adjusted to the absurdity." However, Shearman found the monologue likening the crimes committed by Tooms to the Holocaust, given by the retired detective Briggs, to be "not only unnecessary but tasteless to boot." He ultimately rated the episode four stars out of five. Mumtaj Begum, writing for Malaysia's The Star in 2008, described "Squeeze" as "the episode that really sold The X-Files idea to the masses," and called it "simply brilliant."

In a guest column for Entertainment Weekly's 1000th issue in 2008, author Neil Gaiman listed Tooms as one of his favorite monsters, while UGO Networks listed the character in a 2011 countdown of the "Best TV Serial Killers," and described Hutchison's acting as "uber-creepy." Also in 2008, IGN's Christine Seghers listed Hutchison as the fourth-best guest star of the series in a top-ten countdown, complimented his "brilliantly perverse" performance, and wrote: "Even when he doesn't appear to be doing anything, Hutchinson [sic] can still make your skin crawl with his dead, shark-like stare." In 2009, Connie Ogle from PopMatters listed Tooms amongst the greatest monsters of the series.

== See also ==
- List of unmade episodes of The X-Files
