= F. Emasculata =

- The X-Files episode
- A prisoner with exploding pustules. The pustules were carefully rigged to burst on command by makeup supervisor Toby Lindala.
- Episode no.: Season 2 Episode 22
- Directed by: Rob Bowman
- Written by: Chris Carter; Howard Gordon
- Production code: 2X22
- Original air date: April 28, 1995
- Running time: 45 minutes

Guest appearances
- Charles Martin Smith as Doctor Osborne; Dean Norris as Marshal Tapia; John Pyper-Ferguson as Paul; William B. Davis as The Smoking Man; Angelo Vacco as Angelo Garza; Mitch Pileggi as Walter Skinner

Episode chronology
← Previous "The Calusari"	Next → "Soft Light"
- The X-Files season 2

"F. Emasculata" is the twenty-second episode of the second season of the American science fiction television series The X-Files. It first premiered on the Fox network in the United States on April 28, 1995. It was written by series creator Chris Carter and staff writer Howard Gordon, and directed by Rob Bowman. "F. Emasculata" received a Nielsen rating of 8.9 and was watched by 8.5 million households. The episode received mixed reviews from television critics.

The show centers on FBI special agents Fox Mulder (David Duchovny) and Dana Scully (Gillian Anderson) who work on cases linked to the paranormal, called X-Files. Mulder is a believer in the paranormal, while the skeptical Scully has been assigned to debunk his work. In this episode, Scully tries to discover the cause of a mysterious illness after several men in a prison die. Meanwhile, Mulder attempts to find two escapees who could potentially spread the disease.

"F. Emasculata" was based on the actual practice of pharmaceutical companies sending scientists all over the world looking for plants and animals that could have medicinal use. The X-Files director Frank Spotnitz felt that the episode's exploding pustules were ridiculous because of their over-the-top nature. The Costa Rican forest at the opening was shot at the Seymour Demonstration Forest in North Vancouver.

== Plot ==
In the Costa Rican rainforest, entomologist Robert Torrance discovers a decomposing boar carcass covered with purple pustules. While examining one, it bursts, spraying him with fluid. By nightfall, Torrance develops similar boils and attempts to radio for help. When soldiers arrive the next morning, Torrance is dead.

Simultaneously, in Dinwiddie County, Virginia, a prison inmate also named Robert Torrance receives a package containing an infected leg of meat. A pustule on the meat erupts, and Torrance dies within thirty-six hours. Two other inmates, Paul and Steve, clean Torrance's cell but escape in a laundry cart. Fox Mulder (David Duchovny) and Dana Scully (Gillian Anderson) are sent to help the U.S. Marshals find them. The agents are surprised when the prison is quarantined by the CDC and the National Guard: Mulder decides to join the Marshals to hunt the fugitives while Scully investigates the prison.

Scully discovers that the prison population is infected with a lethal contagion. She finds a pile of body bags ready for incineration and examines Torrance's corpse. Dr. Osbourne from the CDC tries to stop her, but a pustule on Torrance's body erupts in his face. Scully traces Torrance's package to Pinck Pharmaceuticals, a major drug developer, and finds an insect in another prisoner's body. Dr. Osbourne, now visibly infected, reveals that his team works for Pinck and is researching a dilating enzyme produced by the insect. The insect has a parasitic life cycle that kills its hosts. Osbourne claims that Pinck deliberately introduced the insect and contagion into the prison as an experiment. He soon dies, and his body is burned.

Meanwhile, the fugitives murder a man, steal his campervan, and stop at a gas station. Paul calls his girlfriend, Elizabeth, for shelter. They knock out the gas station clerk and escape in his car, evading the Marshals. Mulder witnesses a CDC biohazard team taking the clerk away. Scully warns Mulder that the contagion could spread if the fugitives are not captured. The fugitives reach Elizabeth's house, where she tends to Steve, who is in the late stages of infection. As Steve dies, a pustule erupts in Elizabeth's face, infecting her. Mulder and the Marshals raid the house, and while they manage to arrest Elizabeth, Paul escapes. Mulder therefore decides to confront Skinner and The Smoking Man, suspecting he and Scully were deceived into taking the case. Mulder argues that the public should know the truth of the situation, but the Smoking Man argues it would cause mass panic, which Scully agrees with.

Questioning Elizabeth, Mulder learns Paul plans to flee to Toronto by bus. Mulder and the Marshals track down the bus and surround it. Mulder persuades a panicking Paul to release a teenage hostage, but before Paul can divulge any information, he is shot dead by the Marshals. Later, Scully explains that Pinck sent the package to a namesake of the dead entomologist to disguise their wrongdoing as a postal error. Mulder confronts Skinner in his office, determined to go public. Skinner, however, warns him they lack evidence, and he tells Mulder to be more cautious in future cases.

== Production ==
While F. emasculata and Pinck Pharmaceuticals are fictitious, the show was inspired by the fact that pharmaceutical companies do send researchers the world over looking for unique plants or animals that might prove to have medicinal use. Initially, the show's producers were worried about releasing the episode around the same time as the film Outbreak—a movie in which a deadly, contagious disease spreads in a California town. In the end, however, they realized that the two entities were substantially different from one another. Notably, the Smoking Man appears in this episode; his appearance in stand-alone or monster-of-the-week episodes was unusual, as Chris Carter preferred not to mix the show's overarching mythology with its self-contained episodes.

The exploding pustules were carefully rigged to burst on command. Makeup supervisor Toby Lindala created a device that was connected to the fake sores by discreet tubing. When the device was activated, the sores would explode. Filming the scenes with this device was particularly arduous, and Lindala later noted, "[In one scene] I was jammed underneath one of the bus seats with these extras basically stepping on my head." The X-Files director Frank Spotnitz remarked, "When we saw the pustule bursting on film, we just laughed because it was just so over-the-top grotesque." The Lower Seymour Conservation Reserve, North Vancouver stood in for the Costa Rican jungle; this location had previously been used for the season opener "Little Green Men". Both the gas station and the bus station used the same set, which was actually a redecorated car dealership located in Delta, British Columbia.

== Reception ==
"F. Emasculata" was originally broadcast in the United States on the Fox network on April 28, 1995. This episode earned a Nielsen rating of 8.9, with a 16 share, meaning that roughly 8.9 percent of all television-equipped households, and 16 percent of households watching television, were tuned in to the episode. It was viewed by 8.5 million households.

The episode received generally mixed reviews from television critics. Entertainment Weekly graded the episode a C, writing, "A good idea is tainted by plot holes as gaping and disturbing as the pustular boils you'll be treated to in this hour". Zack Handlen of The A.V. Club was positive, grading it an A. He particularly praised the way the darkness was handled which made it a "tense, gripping mini-movie", and also praised the guest stars. Robert Shearman, in his book Wanting to Believe: A Critical Guide to The X-Files, Millennium & The Lone Gunmen, rated the episode three-and-a-half stars out of five. Writing positively of the first part of the episode, Shearman contended that it "jogs along quite merrily as a simple contagion story". He was, however, more critical of the second half, noting that the story "takes a left turn and becomes a thoughtful analysis on disinformation, on cover-up, and the public right to truth." Shearman called both parts "two really interesting rough drafts", but concluded that the two halves were ill-suited for one another.

== Bibliography ==
- Gradnitzer, Louisa; Todd Pittson (1999). X Marks the Spot: On Location with The X-Files. Arsenal Pulp. ISBN 1-55152-066-4.
- Hurwitz, Matt; Knowles, Chris (2008). The Complete X-Files: Behind the Series the Myths and the Movies. New York, US: Insight Editions. ISBN 978-1-933784-72-4.
- Lowry, Brian (1995). The Truth is Out There: The Official Guide to the X-Files. Harper Prism. ISBN 0061053309.
- Simon, Anne (2001). The Real Science Behind the X-Files: Microbes, Meteorites, and Mutants. New York: Simon & Schuster. p. 65. ISBN 978-0-684-85618-6.
- Shearman, Robert (2009). Wanting to Believe: A Critical Guide to The X-Files, Millennium & The Lone Gunmen. Mad Norwegian Press. ISBN 978-0975944691.
