= The Calusari =

- The X-Files episode
- Episode no.: Season 2 Episode 21
- Directed by: Mike Vejar
- Written by: Sara Charno
- Production code: 2X21
- Original air date: April 14, 1995
- Running time: 44 minutes

Guest appearances
- Helene Clarkson as Maggie Holvey; Joel Palmer as Charlie and Michael Holvey; Lilyan Chauvin as Golda; Kay E. Kuter as the Head Calusari; Ric Reid as Steve Holvey; Christine Willes as Agent Karen Kosseff; Bill Dow as Dr. Charles Burks

Episode chronology
← Previous "Humbug"	Next → "F. Emasculata"
- The X-Files season 2

"The Calusari" is the twenty-first episode of the second season of the American science fiction television series The X-Files. It originally aired on the Fox network on April 14, 1995. It was written by Sara B. Charno and directed by Michael Vejar. "The Calusari" is a "Monster-of-the-Week" story, unconnected to the series' wider mythology, or fictional history. It earned a Nielsen household rating of 8.3, being watched by 7.9 million households in its initial broadcast. Due to perceived inconsistencies in the plot, "The Calusari" received mixed reviews from television critics.

The show centers on FBI special agents Fox Mulder (David Duchovny) and Dana Scully (Gillian Anderson) who work on cases linked to the paranormal, called X-Files. In this episode, a photograph taken just before the death of a two-year-old boy yields evidence of some supernatural intervention which piques Mulder and Scully's curiosity. When another death in the family occurs, the grandmother of the remaining child requests the aid of some Romanian ritualists, named the Calusari, in order to cleanse the home of evil.

The script for "The Calusari" was inspired by Charno's experience as a doctor of Eastern medicine. The inspiration for the entry came from an idea series creator Chris Carter had involving someone getting hanged with a garage-door opener. Because "The Calusari" was heavy in terms of violence, Fox's standards and practices department took issues with several scenes. In addition, Carter re-cut the episode after it was completed in order to make it scarier.

== Plot ==
In Murray, Virginia, Maggie (Helene Clarkson) and Steve Holvey (Ric Reid) visit an amusement park with their children. During the outing, Teddy, the youngest child, loses his balloon. His father, Steve, substitutes it with Charlie's balloon. In a tragic turn of events, Teddy follows the balloon onto the tracks and is fatally struck by a train. Strangely, Charlie appears unaffected by Teddy's death.

Three months later, Fox Mulder (David Duchovny) shows Dana Scully (Gillian Anderson) a photo taken moments before Teddy's death that suggests a mysterious force lured Teddy onto the tracks. The agents later visit the Holveys, and Scully grows suspicious of Maggie's elderly Romanian mother, Golda (Lilyan Chauvin), who is seen drawing a swastika on the boy's hand. Scully hypothesizes that the Holvey children may be victims of Munchausen by proxy, perpetrated by their grandmother. As they delve deeper into the case, Steve recalls odd occurrences surrounding Golda's arrival after Teddy's birth. Concerned for Charlie's safety, Scully suggests involving the social worker named Karen Kosseff (Christine Willes). However, tragedy strikes when Steve is accidentally killed in his garage, and when the police investigate his death, they discover evidence of ritualistic sacrifices in Golda's room.

In her room, Golda initiates a ritual with several Căluşari mystics. In the meantime, Kosseff shows up at the Holveys' house and asks to meet with Charlie. Suddenly the boy begins to convulse. After noticing smoke billowing out from under Golda's door, Kosseff and Maggie interrupt the ritual. This, however, leads to Golda's demise at Charlie's hands. Kosseff rushes off and finds Mulder, who in turn questions the Căluşari mystics. They explain that their ritual was an attempt to stop "an ancient and unrelenting evil". Kosseff later sits Charlie down and inquires about the struggle, but the boy swears that it was not him in his grandmother's room, but rather another boy named "Michael". Maggie later tells Mulder and Scully that Michael was the name of Charlie's twin brother who was a stillborn. Terrified, she insists that she and Steve never told Charlie. After Charlie was born, Golda tried to perform a ritual that would have separated the spirits of the two boys. However, Steve would not allow it.

Charlie seizes again and is taken to a hospital. However, Michael pretends to be Charlie and convinces Maggie to take him home. Scully witnesses what is happening, and informs Mulder, who is certain that the spirit of Michael, and not Charlie, is killing people. The two agents split up: Mulder tracks down the Căluşari mystics to complete the ritual, and Scully goes to Maggie's home to protect her. Although Michael very nearly kills Scully and Maggie, Mulder and the Căluşari manage to complete the ritual, which causes Michael's spirit to disappear. Maggie then returns to the hospital and is reunited with Charlie.

== Production ==
Golda draws a left-facing swastika on Charlie's hand, a protective symbol in many Eastern religions.

The episode was written by Sara Charno and directed by Mike Vejar. Before becoming a writer, Charno had been a doctor of Eastern medicine, and so her "esoteric knowledge that none of the rest of [the writers] had about all kinds of things" was put to use in this script, according to writer Frank Spotnitz. The episode was based largely on an idea that series creator Chris Carter had had about a "garage-door opener hanging". Christine Willes, who plays the part of Agent Kosseff, reprises her role; she originally appeared in the earlier episode "Irresistible".

During production of the episode, the producers "agonized" over both the teaser (given that it revolves around a child being killed by a tram) and the episode's over-all bleakness. Fox's standards and practices department, on the other hand, took issues with the initial cut of Steve's strangulation scene; in the end, the sequence was kept but the actor's face was obscured to "soften the impact". Although the episode's filming went along smoothly, the final cut "didn't pass muster". Spotnitz explained that Carter "spent a lot of time in the editing room trying to figure out how to make this more terrifying." Spotnitz later noted that Carter's dedication proved that something could be so "much better ... if you didn't give up."

== Broadcast and reception ==
"The Calusari" originally aired on the Fox network on April 14, 1995. The episode earned a Nielsen household rating of 8.3 with a 16 share, meaning that roughly 8.3 percent of all television-equipped households, and 16 percent of households watching TV, were tuned in to the episode. A total of 7.9 million households watched this episode during its original airing. "The Calusari" is the only episode of the series to have received an explicit rating of "18" in the United Kingdom by the BBFC for "occasional strong horror" and themes involving "demonic possession".

"The Calusari" received mixed reviews, with critics citing inconsistencies in the plot as the main detractions. Entertainment Weekly gave the episode a "B−" rating, calling it "an Exorcist/Omen rip-off, but a classy one". Emily VanDerWerff of The A.V. Club gave it a "C+", writing that it was "an episode with a lot of great and spooky moments", but "a messy, chaotic story that could have been much better developed, and too many things that happen [...] just because the writers thought it would be cool if they happened". However, while she was "not sure everything hangs together" and wished for more backstory, VanDerWerff did praise some "really great moments", particularly the opening teaser. Robert Shearman, in his book Wanting to Believe: A Critical Guide to The X-Files, Millennium & The Lone Gunmen, gave the episode a largely negative review and rated it one-and-a-half stars out of five. The writer called it a "pale retread of The Exorcist" and noted that many of the episode's elements, like the chicken-sacrificing grandmother and the Calusari members, were "tremendously crass". Shearman, however, did enjoy the episode's dialogue, praising one scene in particular where the spirit of Michael torments his mother by asking to be taken to the amusement park and ride the train that killed his younger brother. Regardless, however, Shearman concluded that "there's something stale and pointless at [the episode's] heart."

The plot for "The Calusari" was later adapted into a novel for young adults in 1997 by Garth Nix.

== Bibliography ==
- Hurwitz, Matt & Knowles, Chris (2008). The Complete X-Files: Behind the Series the Myths and the Movies. New York, US: Insight Editions. ISBN 978-1933784724.
- Lowry, Brian (1995). The Truth is Out There: The Official Guide to the X-Files. Harper Prism. ISBN 0061053309.
- Nix, Garth (1997). The Calusari. HarperCollins. ISBN 0-06-447171-3.
- Shearman, Robert (2009). Wanting to Believe: A Critical Guide to The X-Files, Millennium & The Lone Gunmen. Mad Norwegian Press. ISBN 978-0975944691.
