= Founder's Mutation =

- The X-Files episode
- Episode no.: Season 10; Episode 2
- Directed by: James Wong
- Written by: James Wong
- Production code: 1AYW05
- Original air date: January 25, 2016
- Running time: 44 minutes

Guest appearances
- Doug Savant as Augustus Goldman; Jonathan Whitesell as Janitor; Rebecca Wisocky as Jackie Goldman; Chris Logan as Dr. Sanjay; Omari Newton as Rogers; Nikolai Witschl as Dr. Hill; Alison Wandzura as Cynthia; Aaron Douglas as Lindquist; Vik Sahay as Gupta; Ryan Robbins as Murphy; Christine Willes as Sister Mary; Kacey Rohl as Agnes; Craig March as Detective Gordon; Megan Peta Hill as Molly Goldman

Episode chronology
← Previous "My Struggle"	Next → "Mulder and Scully Meet the Were-Monster"
- The X-Files season 10

"Founder's Mutation" is the second episode of the tenth season of The X-Files. It was written and directed by James Wong, and aired on January 25, 2016, on the Fox network. Guest stars include Doug Savant, Rebecca Wisocky, Omari Newton, Aaron Douglas, Vik Sahay, Ryan Robbins, Christine Willes, and Kacey Rohl.

The installment primarily serves as a "Monster-of-the-Week" story, that is, a stand-alone plot, but is also tangentially connected to the series' overarching Mythology.

== Plot ==
At the headquarters of Nugenics Technology, researcher Dr. Sanjay arrives at work in a troubled state, hearing a mysterious high-pitched noise in his head. At a staff meeting, the noise becomes so overwhelming that he flees and locks himself inside a server room, where he begins frantically deleting data. Desperate to stop the noise, he shoves a letter opener through his eardrum and into his brain, killing himself. Before doing so, he writes something on the palm of his left hand.

With the X-Files now re-opened by the FBI, reinstated agents Fox Mulder and Dana Scully are dispatched to investigate the incident. Receiving little cooperation from Nugenics, Mulder steals Sanjay's mobile phone and contacts the last person he called. At a Washington bar, he meets a man named Gupta, Sanjay's secret lover. Gupta tells Mulder that Sanjay had expressed concern that his "kids" were dying. Meanwhile, Scully performs Sanjay's autopsy and finds the words "founder's mutation" written on his left palm – a reference to Nugenics' reclusive owner, Dr. Augustus Goldman, known to employees as "The Founder". Upon searching Sanjay's apartment in Dupont Circle, the agents discover several photographs of horribly disfigured children. Police arrive, and Mulder suddenly becomes overwhelmed by the high-pitched noise which afflicted Sanjay. The sound somehow conveys the message "find her" to Mulder.

Upon presenting their findings to Assistant Director Walter Skinner, Mulder and Scully are told that the case has been closed in order to placate the Department of Defense, which has ties to Goldman and Nugenics. Privately, however, he tells the agents to continue. Observing footage of birds which flocked near the Nugenics building at the time of Sanjay's death, Mulder thinks that the noise is a frequency normally unheard by humans. Citing Nugenics' reluctance to assist in the investigation, the agents visit the hospital where Scully works in order to find Goldman, who happens to be one of the hospital's biggest donors. They are approached by a young woman named Agnes, who expresses a desire to leave and claims her unborn child is abnormal. Outside, Mulder and Scully discuss the possibility that Goldman is experimenting on pregnant women for The Project, and reminisce about their son William, who remains in hiding. Later, Scully has a fantasy about living with William, shown as a teenager going to school, having an accident, and having alien, lizard-like black eyes.

The agents receive approval to meet Goldman, who purports to conduct research on children suffering from debilitating genetic conditions such as Proteus syndrome, Crouzon syndrome, epidermal dysplasia, Pitt-Hopkins syndrome, ichthyosis, and Marfan syndrome. During a tour of his facility, they witness a confrontation in which one of his patients causes objects to move on their own. Soon afterward, they learn that Agnes has been struck and killed by a car, with her fetus mysteriously missing. The agents next question Goldman's wife Jackie, who has been confined to an insane asylum and claims her husband is keeping her there against her will. She recalls an incident in which her young daughter fell into a swimming pool and was thought to have drowned after spending ten minutes submerged. Jumping into the water, Jackie was shocked to find her daughter instead breathing normally underwater. Realizing that Goldman experimented on her while pregnant, she fled but wrecked her car. Under attack by the noise – her unborn child's attempt to communicate with her telepathically – Jackie cut her uterus open with a kitchen knife; the baby escaped and was presumed dead.

Using security footage, Mulder and Scully discover that a Nugenics janitor working one floor directly beneath Sanjay reacted strangely at the precise moment of his suicide. They drive to the remote home of the janitor, Kyle Gilligan, and are confronted by his adoptive mother. Mulder is once again incapacitated by the noise. Noticing a nearby flock of birds, Scully quickly locates Kyle, forces him to stop, and takes him in to custody. Kyle reveals that he killed Sanjay unintentionally and demands to meet his sister, who is one of Goldman's test subjects. Kyle is taken to Goldman's lab, where he is presented with a girl who Goldman claims to be his sister. However, Kyle quickly realizes that the girl is a decoy and not his actual sister, and he runs down the corridor where he encounters the irate patient from earlier – his real sister, Molly. After speaking to each other telepathically, the siblings use their abilities to repel the agents. Utilizing the noise, they kill Goldman and flee the Nugenics building.

== Production ==
"Founder's Mutation" was written and directed by James Wong, making it his first directorial contribution to The X-Files since 1996's "Musings of a Cigarette Smoking Man", as well as his first writing credit since 1997's "Never Again", both of which aired as part of the show's fourth season. "Founder's Mutation" was the fifth of the season's episodes to have been written and filmed, and it was originally going to be the fifth episode to air. However, it was later chosen to air the day after "My Struggle". The episode guest stars Doug Savant, Rebecca Wisocky, Omari Newton, Aaron Douglas, Vik Sahay, Ryan Robbins, Christine Willes, and Kacey Rohl. Willes previously played a different character, Agent Karen Kosseff, in seasons two and four.

== Reception ==
=== Ratings ===
"Founder's Mutation" debuted on January 25, 2016, and was watched by 9.67 million viewers. It scored a 3.2 Nielsen rating in the 18- to 49-year-old demographic (Nielsen ratings are audience measurement systems that determine the audience size and composition of television programming in the United States), which means that the episode was seen by 3.2 percent of all individuals aged 18- to 49-years old who were watching television at the time of the episode's airing. Although the episode marked a decrease in ratings from the previous episode, it was noted that the viewership remained "startlingly large". This episode was also the highest-rated broadcast program of the night.

=== Reviews ===
Alex McCown of The A.V. Club reviewed the first three episodes of the revival and awarded them collectively a "B+". Although he largely derided the season's opening episode, "My Struggle", he argued that the season "immediately course corrects" with Wong's "Founder’s Mutation"; he called the "smart" and "unsettling" episode "a solid return to form". He felt that the episode's dialogue allowed the audience to remember "what we like about these characters, and why they work so well together". Darren Franich of Entertainment Weekly awarded the episode a "B", arguing that "Founder's Mutation" is "fun for fans of the show" and "an improvement over the premiere". Brian Tallerico of RogerEbert.com wrote that "Founder's Mutation" "perfectly blends show mythology (including Mulder and Scully’s kid) with a modern plot". Kaly Soto of The New York Times gave the episode a favorable review, noting that it gave her "faith in this new iteration" and praising Anderson's performance in particular: "Gillian Anderson does a flawless job of imbuing Scully with a sense of grief over William, her voice brittle and her expressions slow and weary". Matthew Chernov of Variety wrote that unlike the first episode, the chemistry between Mulder and Scully "seems much closer to the playful banter we're used to from the good old days" and that the script "allows Gillian Anderson to do some of the best work in the series so far".
