= Mulder and Scully Meet the Were-Monster =

- The X-Files episode
- Episode no.: Season 10; Episode 3
- Directed by: Darin Morgan
- Written by: Darin Morgan
- Production code: 1AYW03
- Original air date: February 1, 2016
- Running time: 44 minutes

Guest appearances
- Rhys Darby as Guy Mann; Kumail Nanjiani as Pasha; Richard Newman as Dr. Rumanovitch; Tyler Labine as Stoner #1; Nicole Parker-Smith as Stoner #2; Alex Diakun as Manager; D.J. "Shangela" Pierce as Annabell

Episode chronology
← Previous "Founder's Mutation"	Next → "Home Again"
- The X-Files season 10

"Mulder and Scully Meet the Were-Monster" is the third episode of the tenth season of The X-Files, written and directed by Darin Morgan, it aired on February 1, 2016, on Fox and guest stars Rhys Darby as Guy Mann, Kumail Nanjiani as Pasha, and Tyler Labine as Stoner #1.

The show centers on FBI special agents who work on unsolved paranormal cases called X-Files; this season focuses on the investigations of Fox Mulder (David Duchovny), and Dana Scully (Gillian Anderson) after their reinstatement in the FBI. In this episode, Mulder and Scully investigate mysterious killings seemingly perpetrated by a were-monster. Eventually, Mulder meets said "monster" (Darby), a lizard-creature, who, after having been bitten by a human, turns into a human during the day. The installment serves as a "monster-of-the-week" story, that is, a stand-alone plot unconnected to the overarching Mythology.

"Mulder and Scully Meet the Were-Monster" can trace its origin back to a script entitled "The M Word" that Morgan had written for Frank Spotnitz's short-lived show, Night Stalker. Once it was decided that The X-Files would be revived, Morgan heavily modified his script so that it could work as an episode involving Mulder and Scully. This also allowed Morgan to add in various easter eggs. The episode was met with glowing critical reception, with most reviewers calling it the best episode of the tenth season; for instance, Rotten Tomatoes, a review aggregator, awarded the episode a 100% approval rating with an average score of 9.5 out of 10 based on 22 reviews. Ratings-wise, the episode was watched by 8.37 million viewers, and scored a 2.7 Nielsen rating in the 18- to 49-year-old demographic.

== Plot ==
When a dead body is found with its throat ripped open in the woods outside Shawan, Oregon, Dana Scully and Fox Mulder are called in to investigate whether it was an animal attack, a serial killer or just maybe a strange creature as described by eyewitnesses. Mulder continues to question his faith in the unexplained as he attempts to gather proof of the existence of the new creature he and Scully investigate before jumping to conclusions. During an inspection of a truck stop, Mulder, Scully, and an animal control officer named Pasha (Kumail Nanjiani) seemingly encounter the creature.

Eventually, evidence starts to coalesce, and Mulder begins to suspect that an individual named Guy Mann (Rhys Darby) is actually a murderous were-monster, capable of transforming into a lizard person. After confronting Mann, his suspicions are proven only half correct: Mann is not a man who turns into a lizard person, but rather a lizard person who turns into a human. Mann apparently became a shape-shifter after being bitten by a human some days before and laments the existential hopelessness of human life, full sentience, and modern society. In the end, it is revealed that Pasha was the true killer, and that Mann was simply in the wrong place at the wrong time. Upon learning this, Mulder rushes to tell Mann, who quickly brushes off the news. He informs Mulder that he will be going into a 10,000 year hibernation, but that he was glad to have met Mulder. Then, before Mulder's eyes, Mann turns back into his original lizard person form and scampers off into the night. Mulder thus witnesses a paranormal happening, and his faith is renewed.

== Production ==
=== Writing ===
"Mulder and Scully Meet the Were-Monster" was written and directed by Darin Morgan, the younger brother of producer and fellow writer Glen Morgan. This episode marked the first time that the younger Morgan had written an episode for the series since 1996's "Jose Chung's From Outer Space", which had aired as part of the show's third season. Morgan wrote this episode "to comment on the nature and format of monster-of-the-week episodes themselves". The episode can trace its origin back to a script entitled "The M Word" that Morgan had written for Frank Spotnitz's short-lived show, Night Stalker. Because the show was abruptly cancelled, Morgan's script was never used. When he heard that The X-Files was returning, he realized this was the perfect opportunity to tell the story, and he "leapt at the chance" to finish it. Because the script had not been written with The X-Files in mind, Morgan was forced to "readjust everything, giving Mulder and Scully parts".

=== Casting ===
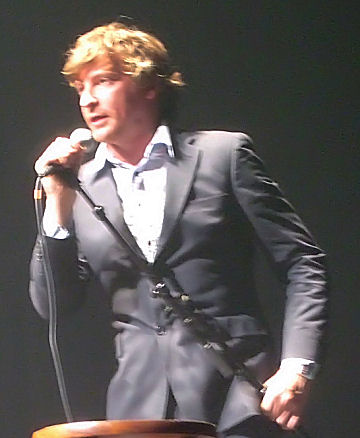
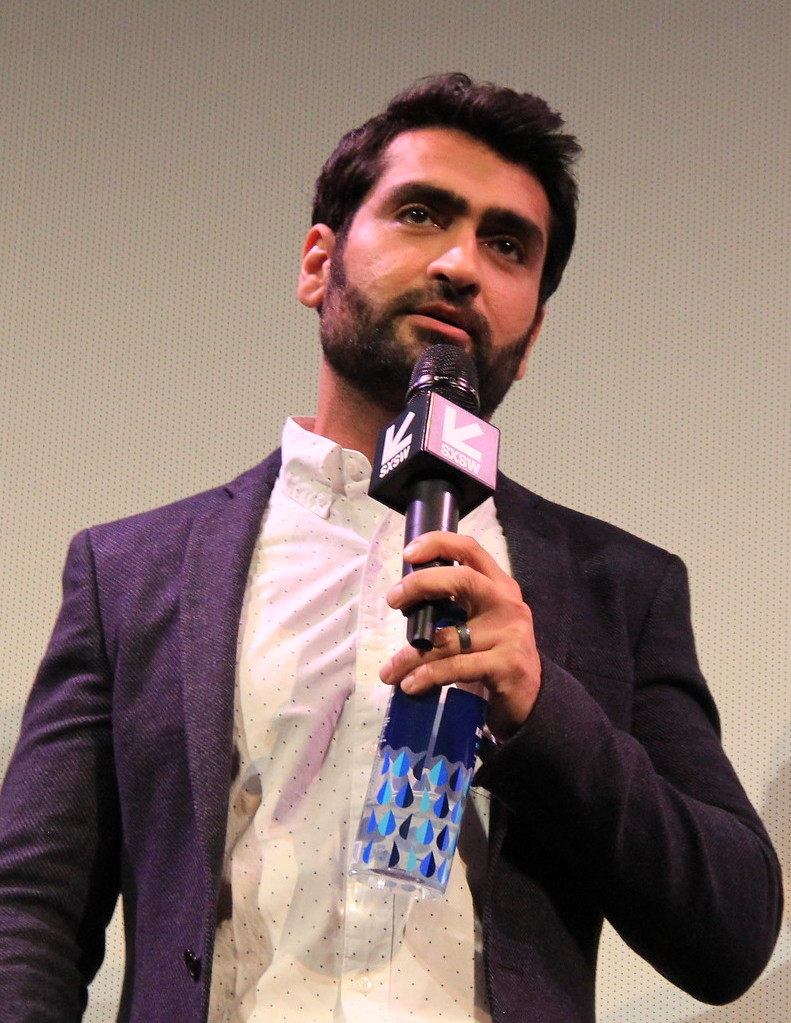
The episode guest stars Rhys Darby (left) and Kumail Nanjiani (right).

The episode guest stars Rhys Darby as Guy Mann and Kumail Nanjiani as Pasha. Darby was nervous about appearing in the episode, largely due to "the amount of story I had to tell". He was, however, more confident about playing up the comedic nature of the role, due to his history as a comedian. Darby explained that when he usually films, he enjoys improvising new lines, or ad-libbing bits to make existing lines funnier, but with Morgan’s script he found this unnecessary: "His writing was perfect—I couldn't deviate off the tracks. Normally, as a comic actor, I like to improvise and try and make things funnier than they are on paper. But there was no improvement I could make."

Nanjiani—a self-professed fan of The X-Files—hosts a podcast called "The X-Files Files", in which he and a guest discuss various episodes. Morgan enjoyed Nanjiani's "critical thinking about the series on [the] podcast", and he decided to offer him a role in this episode. Nanjiani was worried that the fans would think he "ruined the show", and he jokingly said, "It's like being in love with a gorgeous woman for 20 years. And then, when you finally go out with her, you end up murdering her."

The episode also features Tyler Labine and Nicole Parker-Smith reprising their roles as the "stoner" characters introduced in an earlier episode written by Morgan, "War of the Coprophages", and featured in "Quagmire" (an episode for which Morgan assisted with the writing). Alex Diakun, who guest stars in this episode as a hotel manager, previously appeared in Morgan's episodes "Jose Chung's From Outer Space", "Clyde Bruckman's Final Repose" and "Humbug" as different characters.

=== Filming ===
According to Morgan, the episode—which was shot during a very warm week in Vancouver—required many long days of work, which caused difficulty with filming. He later said, "Nobody had any fun filming this episode except for Kumail. He had so much fun that he made up for everybody else." Nanjiani said of his first day on the set, "My first day was late night in the Vancouver forest. I got there, and it was lit like [the Vancouver-produced episodes of] The X-Files, and I was like, 'Oh my gosh, I'm on The X-Files.'"

== Series in-jokes ==
The episode heavily features in-jokes and easter eggs that reference past episodes. In the fifth season episode "Chinga", Mulder revealed his penchant for throwing pencils into his office's ceiling. In this episode, he takes to throwing them at the famous "I Want to Believe" poster. After single-handedly taking down Pasha, Scully hushes Mulder's concerns, noting, "You forget... I'm immortal." This is a reference to Morgan's "Clyde Bruckman's Final Repose", wherein the title character, after being asked by Scully how she will die, responds that she will not. When the motel owner looks into Mulder’s room, he sees him sleeping in a red speedo, a reference to a scene in the second season episode "Duane Barry". The graveyard where Mulder and Mann talk prominently features tombstones with the names "Kim Manners" and "Jack Hardy". Manners was a former director of the series, who worked on 52 episodes; the tombstones' epigraph—"Let’s kick it in the ass"—was a saying often uttered by Manners. Hardy was an assistant director to Carter on The X-Files' sister series Millennium and spin-off The Lone Gunmen—as well as The X-Files: I Want to Believe (2008). Mann's dog's name, Daggoo, is a reference to Herman Melville's novel Moby Dick, continuing a tradition of featuring Melville-inspired names in the series (Scully's father used to call her Starbuck; Scully's former dog—referenced in this episode—was named Queequeg; and in "Quagmire", Scully likens Mulder's search for the truth to Captain Ahab's search for the great white whale). The stoners from "Quagmire" reprise their roles as stoners in this episode. Mulder's cell phone ringtone is the series' theme song. Guy Mann is dressed in a similar rumpled seersucker suit and battered straw hat with a red and black hatband that was worn by INS reporter Carl Kolchak as played by Darren McGavin in the 1970s series Kolchak: the Night Stalker, a TV series that Carter has said inspired him to create The X-Files. McGavin went on to play the part of Arthur Dales in the episodes "Travelers" and "Agua Mala" in the fifth and sixth seasons of The X-Files, respectively.

== Reception ==
=== Ratings ===
"Mulder and Scully Meet the Were-Monster" debuted on February 1, 2016, and was watched by 8.37 million viewers. It scored a 2.7 Nielsen rating in the 18- to 49-year-old demographic (Nielsen ratings are audience measurement systems that determine the audience size and composition of television programming in the United States), which means that the episode was seen by 2.7 percent of all individuals aged 18- to 49-years old who were watching television at the time of the episode's airing. This marked a drop in ratings from the previous week's episode, but the episode was still the highest-rated broadcast program of the night.

=== Reviews ===
Critics praised the episode. On Rotten Tomatoes, the episode garnered a 100% approval rating with an average score of 9.5 out of 10 based on 22 reviews, writing, "'Mulder and Scully Meet the Were-Monster' is a welcome return to traditional X-Files format, making the most of a surreal, comedic episode with terrific one-liners." Alex McCown of The A.V. Club called "Mulder and Scully Meet the Were-Monster" an "instant classic". He concluded that the episode is "a brilliant and empathetic justification of the series' return" and therefore "makes the case for why The X-Files is still worth having around". Later, Zack Handlen, also of The A.V. Club, awarded the episode an "A" grade. He praised Morgan's writing and direction, stating, "his script and direction in 'The Were-Monster' are as ambitious and funny as one might hope". Overall, he wrote that the episode "is the first episode of the show's new season that feels like a legit defense of season 10's existence". Brian Tallerico of RogerEbert.com wrote that "Mulder and Scully Meet the Were-Monster" is "hysterical, smart and so much fun." Darren Franich of Entertainment Weekly awarded the episode an "A" and called the episode a "wild, playful, brain-twisting, heart-pulling, and above all adventurous episode of television." IGN's Matt Fowler gave it a very positive review with a score of 9.5 out of 10. He called it "a funny, clever, absorbing episode" and praised the guest performances, especially that of Rhys Darby.
