= My Struggle (disambiguation) =

My Struggle usually refers to Mein Kampf, an autobiography–manifesto by Adolf Hitler, most often referred to by its untranslated German title.

My Struggle or Mein Kampf may also refer to:

- Mein Kampf (film) (1959) , a Swedish documentary film by Erwin Leiser about the rise and fall of Adolf Hitler
- My Struggle (Knausgård novels), a novel series by Karl Ove Knausgård
- "My Struggle" (The X-Files), a 2016 episode
- My Struggle (Mark Mothersbaugh), a satirical book, by Mark Mothersbaugh as Booji Boy, of the American new wave band Devo
- My Struggle (Paul Merton), a spoof memoir by Paul Merton.
