= My Struggle II =

- The X-Files episode
- Episode no.: Season 10; Episode 6
- Directed by: Chris Carter
- Story by: Anne Simon; Margaret Fearon; Chris Carter
- Teleplay by: Chris Carter
- Production code: 1AYW06
- Original air date: February 22, 2016
- Running time: 43 minutes

Guest appearances
- Annabeth Gish as Monica Reyes; Joel McHale as Tad O'Malley; Lauren Ambrose as Agent Einstein; Robbie Amell as Agent Miller; Julian Christopher as Dr. Oscar Griffiths; William B. Davis as Cigarette Smoking Man; Aliza Vellani as Nurse Sandeep

Episode chronology
← Previous "Babylon"	Next → "My Struggle III"
- The X-Files season 10

"My Struggle II" is the sixth episode and season finale of the tenth season of The X-Files. Written and directed by Chris Carter, it aired on February 22, 2016, on Fox. The tagline for this episode is "This Is the End".

== Plot ==
Six weeks after the events of "My Struggle", Scully arrives at FBI headquarters to find that Mulder has disappeared after watching an excerpt from Tad O'Malley's online news broadcast (which had been revived). As Scully informs Skinner and Einstein of Mulder's absence, Mulder attempts to leave Washington—visibly unwell and badly bruised.

Back in Washington, D.C., Scully receives a phone call from O'Malley, who has arrived at Mulder's house for a pre-arranged meeting and found signs of a struggle. O'Malley explains that he suspects that alien DNA has been injected into every American citizen in order to facilitate the widespread outbreak of the Spartan Virus. Designed to strip humans of their immune systems, this contagion quickly manifests itself nationwide, with Scully and Einstein noting a sharp increase in the number of patients admitted to hospitals and triage centers.

Miller finds a phone-tracking app on Mulder's computer, notes his position in Spartanburg, South Carolina, and leaves Washington in order to track him down, while Einstein questions Scully's medical theories. Scully, accepting that Einstein may be correct, receives a phone-call from former X-Files agent Monica Reyes (Annabeth Gish), who asks to meet, claiming that she knows how to develop a vaccine.

During their meeting, Reyes reveals that, shortly after the closure of the X-Files, she was contacted by the badly injured Cigarette Smoking Man, who had survived the confrontation in New Mexico. Cigarette Smoking Man offers to secure Reyes a place among the designated survivors of the end-times, in exchange for Reyes' assistance in the colonization effort. Reyes departs the FBI shortly thereafter, and is absent when Scully "looks her up" in 2016. Reyes also reveals that she has spent the past twelve years assisting Cigarette Smoking Man and that Scully will survive the coming apocalypse due to her alien DNA that was given to her through her abductions and the experiments performed on her, one of the "chosen elite".

Scully and Einstein attempt to develop a vaccine using Scully's DNA. Scully realizes that she is being protected from the contagion by the alien genomes that remained after she was abducted and experimented on. It is the absence of alien DNA that makes everybody else susceptible. Mulder, meanwhile, approaches Cigarette Smoking Man, who offers him a chance to survive the outbreak. Mulder declines, and is found by Miller, who returns him to Washington with the hope of finding a cure.

O'Malley tells the nation that a friend, a doctor, has informed him of the existence of a vaccine.

After administering a vaccine to Einstein, Scully travels to Mulder and Miller's location, finding them at the 14th Street Bridge. She realizes that Mulder is too badly ill to survive without a stem cell transplant. When Miller asks how this will be possible, Scully replies that William, their son, will have to be the donor. While Scully and Miller discuss Mulder's prognosis, Mulder begins to succumb to the virus. Suddenly, a beam of light shines down onto Miller, Scully, and Mulder, and a triangle-shaped UFO slowly descends and hovers above them.

The episode ends with Scully looking at the lights of the spacecraft, shining down directly onto her and her partners.

== Production ==
The episode was directed by series creator Chris Carter who wrote the teleplay. Anne Simon and Margaret Fearon receive story credit along with Carter. Simon is the science adviser for the series and has worked on the series since the first season. The episode features the return of Annabeth Gish as Monica Reyes, whose casting was announced in August 2015. The episode also guest stars Joel McHale, Lauren Ambrose, and Robbie Amell, all reprising their roles from previous episodes as new characters that were introduced in this season. William B. Davis appears as Cigarette Smoking Man in a significant role, after previously appearing in small cameo roles in two previous season ten episodes.

During the halftime period of Super Bowl 50, Fox briefly posted preview footage of the episode on its website and social media channels.

The episode's ending scene set on the 14th Street Bridge was filmed on the Georgia Viaduct in Vancouver, British Columbia on September 2, 2015, near Rogers Arena. The producers had to close the viaduct to the public in order to shoot the scene.

== Reception ==
"My Struggle II" received generally negative reviews from critics. On Rotten Tomatoes, the episode received a 32% approval rating and an average score of 4.7/10. The consensus reads: "Arguably noble intentions notwithstanding, 'My Struggle II' serves as a disappointingly sloppy conclusion to The X-Files' long-awaited revival — and a painfully persuasive argument that the show was better left 'out there'."

In its initial broadcast in the United States on February 22, 2016, it received 7.60 million viewers, an increase in viewership from the previous week's 7.07 million viewers.
