= My Struggle (The X-Files) =

- The X-Files episode
- Episode no.: Season 10; Episode 1
- Directed by: Chris Carter
- Written by: Chris Carter
- Production code: 1AYW01
- Original air date: January 24, 2016
- Running time: 44 minutes

Guest appearances
- Joel McHale as Tad O'Malley; Annet Mahendru as Sveta; William B. Davis as Cigarette Smoking Man; Hiro Kanagawa as Garner; Aliza Vellani as Nurse Sandeep

Episode chronology
← Previous "The Truth"	Next → "Founder's Mutation"
- The X-Files season 10

"My Struggle" is the first episode of the tenth season of The X-Files. Written and directed by series creator Chris Carter, the episode aired on the Fox network on January 24, 2016. Guest stars include Joel McHale as Tad O'Malley and Annet Mahendru as Sveta.

The show centers on FBI special agents who work on unsolved paranormal cases called X-Files; this season focuses on the investigations of Fox Mulder (David Duchovny), and Dana Scully (Gillian Anderson) after their reinstatement in the FBI. In this episode, Mulder is contacted by Scully at the behest of FBI Assistant Director Walter Skinner (Mitch Pileggi), who wants him to meet a right-wing online webcaster named Tad O'Malley (McHale). O'Malley claims that the idea of an alien invasion is just a smoke-screen for nefarious government doings, and he claims to have proof.

"My Struggle" debuted to a select crowd at the 2015 New York Comic Con, where it was lauded by fans and critics alike. However, closer to the episode's premiere, pre-release reviews were much more critical of, among other things, the excessive use of monologues and the performances of the cast. Nonetheless, the episode was a ratings success, being watched by 16.19 million viewers; this made it the most-watched episode of The X-Files to air since the eighth season episode "This Is Not Happening" in 2001. Furthermore, when DVR and streaming are taken into account, "My Struggle" was seen by 21.4 million viewers.

== Plot ==
The episode opens with a monologue by Fox Mulder detailing alien-related events in history, leading up to his partnership with Dana Scully and their investigations into the X-Files. The subsequent scene takes place in 1947, when an unnamed military doctor is escorted by a Man in Black via bus to the site of a crashed spacecraft in the New Mexico desert. After viewing the wreck in amazement, the doctor finds a trail of blood leading to a wounded being, ostensibly an alien, crawling away from the scene. Despite the doctor's pleas, soldiers shoot and kill the alien.

Moving to the present day, fourteen years after the closure of the X-Files and seven years after the events of I Want to Believe, Mulder is contacted by Scully at the behest of FBI Assistant Director Walter Skinner, who wants him to meet a right-wing online webcaster named Tad O'Malley. Mulder and Scully reunite in Washington, D.C., where they are picked up by O'Malley in his limousine and driven to a remote farmhouse in Low Moor, Virginia. Inside, they meet a young woman named Sveta, who claims to have fragmented memories of having her fetuses stolen from her during alien abductions and to possess alien DNA, which Scully agrees to examine. O'Malley takes Mulder to a secret location where a triangular aircraft built from alien technology is being housed. The craft is referred to as an "ARV", or Alien Replica Vehicle.

During her medical examination, Sveta makes several astute observations which allude to Scully's strained relationship with Mulder, making Scully uncomfortable. When the test results on Sveta's blood come back, Scully immediately orders the sample re-tested. Meanwhile, Mulder meets with the now-aged doctor from the New Mexico crash site, a man he has known for 10 years. Mulder offers the doctor a new theory based on the "ARV", Sveta's memories and past hints from the doctor: Mulder now believes that Colonization and the alien invasion were all an elaborate hoax to distract.

Instead, Mulder thinks it was a "conspiracy of men" who have used extraterrestrial technology on human parties for decades, and these events were subsequently made to look like alien abductions. Mulder outlines a global conspiracy involving the hoarding and testing of alien technology which will be utilized at some future point to stage an attack on America and eventually take over the world. The doctor refers to Mulder's previous belief in Colonization as "nonsense" and says that Mulder is now close to the truth, but refuses to disclose the purpose behind the abductions and the tests on human subjects.

Following these revelations, Mulder shares his theory with Scully that the conspiracy is a group armed with alien technology attempting to subvert society and assume power over the world. Before O'Malley can go public with his claims, his website is shut down, the "ARV" craft is destroyed and its scientists are killed by heavily armed men dressed in military uniforms, and a UFO intercepts Sveta while she is driving, she attempts to escape but is killed when her car is destroyed in an explosion. Mulder and Scully meet in a dark parking garage and Scully reveals that Sveta's re-tested DNA sample confirms that she does in fact possess extraterrestrial DNA; a test Scully has performed on herself has revealed that she does as well. Mulder states that Sveta is the key to exposing the conspiracy and those responsible. They then receive an urgent summons from Skinner requesting them to meet him.

The episode ends revealing the Cigarette Smoking Man alive in the present day, receiving word via telephone that the X-Files have been re-opened.

== Production ==
=== Writing ===
Prior to filming, Carter explained that he had "ideas for every [character]" and that the series would strive to tell fresh stories in a "very new political environment". Carter adapted the series to the political and social climate of America during the presidency of Barack Obama, and stated that there would be "plenty of references to Edward Snowden, WikiLeaks, and Julian Assange." For the revival's mythology episodes, of which this is one, Carter noted that he wanted to "monkey with" it and "give you a spin and twist on" the mythology.

=== Casting ===
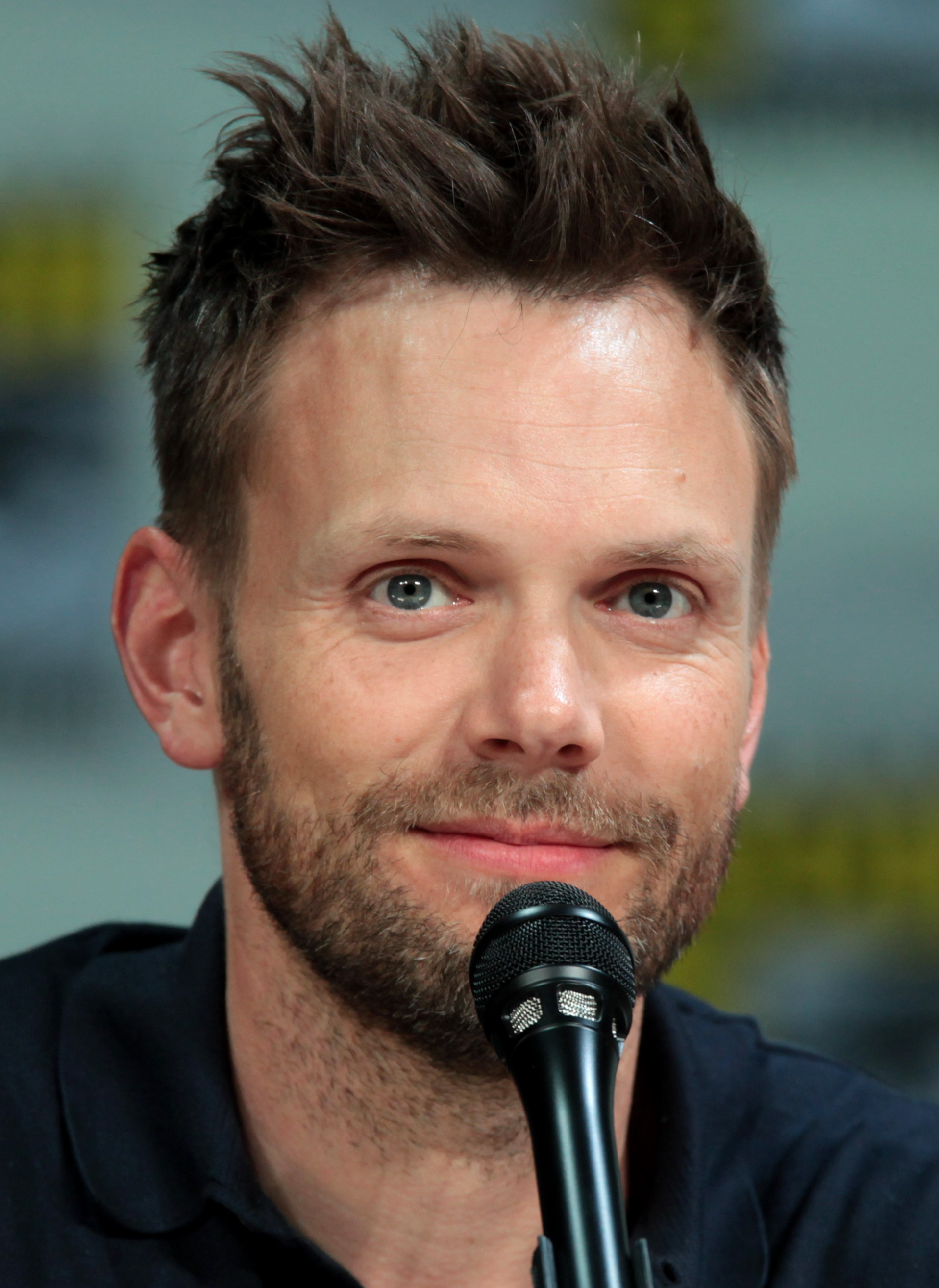
Joel McHale (pictured in 2014) was cast as a guest star after his roast of Barack Obama at the 2014 White House Correspondents Dinner.

After it was confirmed that both Duchovny and Anderson would reprise their respective roles as Mulder and Scully, widespread speculation ensued as to who would also return. Early on it was discovered that Mitch Pileggi, who played Walter Skinner, and William B. Davis, who played Cigarette Smoking Man, would return. Joel McHale was announced as a guest star in June 2015, playing Tad O'Malley, a conservative Internet news anchor who is an unlikely ally of Mulder's. Carter chose to cast McHale after his roast of Barack Obama at the 2014 White House Correspondents Dinner. Hiro Kanagawa guest stars as a scientist named Garner in this episode. Kanagawa previously appeared as two different characters in previous episodes, as Peter Tanaka in the second season episode "Firewalker" and as Dr. Yonechi in the fourth season episode "Synchrony".

=== Filming and effects ===
With "My Struggle", the series returned to Vancouver, Canada for filming. This marked the first time that the series had filmed an episode in the city since the fifth season finale "The End", which aired in 1998. Filming for the episode commenced June 8, 2015.

Because most of the episode is set in Washington, D.C., the crew tried to find parts of Vancouver that could "play" the aforementioned city. Certain shots were digitally altered, with shots of the United States Capitol Building and the Washington Monument added in post-production. One of the episode's opening scenes is a dramatic visualization of the supposed Roswell crash that took place in 1947. Mark Freeborn, the series' production designer, according to Carter, "came up with a UFO crash that was so much bigger and better than I ever imagined it would be." Art director Shannon Grover noted that "everyone wanted to see [a] 1950s classic flying saucer" used in the scene. In addition to a scene featuring a computer-generated version of a saucer crashing, the production crew also created a faux wrecked saucer that was around 50 feet (15 meters) in diameter.

== Reception ==
=== Ratings ===
"My Struggle" debuted on January 24, 2016, and was watched by 16.19 million viewers. It scored a 6.1 Nielsen rating in the 18- to 49-year-old demographic (Nielsen ratings are audience measurement systems that determine the audience size and composition of television programming in the United States), which means that the episode was seen by 6.1 percent of all individuals aged 18- to 49-years old who were watching television at the time of the episode's airing. In terms of viewers, this made "My Struggle" the highest-rated premiere since the seventh season opener "The Sixth Extinction" in 1999, which was viewed by 17.82 million people, as well as the most-watched episode of The X-Files to air since the eighth season episode "This Is Not Happening" in 2001, which was watched by 16.9 million viewers. When DVR and streaming are taken into account, "My Struggle" was seen by 21.4 million viewers, scoring a 7.1 Nielsen rating; this put it on par with the average viewership of the show's highly rated fifth season.

=== Reviews ===
The episode debuted to a select crowd at the 2015 New York Comic Con, and critical reception was mostly positive. Sadie Gennis of TV Guide wrote, "The episode immediately establishes that this is not a reboot nor a mere cash grab, but a thoughtful continuation of the beloved franchise." Chris Eggerstein of HitFix wrote that the tone of the revival was very reminiscent of the show's original run, and that "if you were a fan of the old X-Files, you're probably going to like the new X-Files just fine". Jane Mulkerrins of The Telegraph called the debut "fresh" and "one of the highlights" of the convention. Furthermore, she noted that the premiere was popular with fans, who greeted the episode with a standing ovation.

However, pre-release reviews of "My Struggle" released after the New York Comic Con were more critical. Brian Lowry of Variety magazine panned the opening episode, writing, "It's simply hard to escape the prevailing malaise of this being a deal-driven exercise, a chance to cash in on the name recognition of the title in a format that mitigated the time commitment for all concerned." Similarly, Tim Goodman, writing for The Hollywood Reporter, described the premiere as "a very underwhelming hour that will force even diehard fans [...] to consider whether pushing onward is really worth the time". Darren Franich of Entertainment Weekly awarded the episode a "C−", calling it "one of the single strangest episodes of anything ever" due to it featuring "a chain-gun barrage of catchphrase paranoia and midlife-crisis crypto-Randian anti-philosophy". Brian Tallerico of RogerEbert.com called the episode "stubbornly anachronistic", and unfavorably compared the tone to that of the 2008 film, The X-Files: I Want to Believe. Alex McCown of The A.V. Club largely derided "My Struggle", writing that "it indulges in all of [Chris Carter's] worst [writing] tendencies". He was particularly critical of the episode's expository monologues. Ultimately, he wrote that "the first episode demonstrates some of The X-Files' weaker tendencies, though it possesses a hokey charm, one that comes from pretending as though the past 15 years of television never happened". After the episode aired, The A.V. Club writer Zack Handlen later awarded the episode a "C+" and called it "a mess. But it's a clean mess, if that makes sense, one that at least shows the courtesy of cauterizing most of its loose ends as it goes." Despite arguing that the episode had its flaws, he concluded that he "remain[s] interested to see what happens next.

Matt Fowler of IGN awarded it a 7.2 out of 10, denoting a "good" episode. Fowler wrote positively of Mahendru's performance as Sveta, and he also applauded the focus on the conspiracy as well as the episode's ending. However, he criticized it for having a "bored, disinterested tone". David Zurawik of The Baltimore Sun wrote positively of the episode, applauding the show for exploring the darker side of American politics; he noted that the episode "is all richly textured in the sense of darkness at the heart of America's secret political life [...] I love the dark cultural touchstones this series explores. But that's me. Take me to the river, and wash me in our darkest national deeds."
