= Mayo Simon =

American screenwriter, author, and playwright (born 1928)

- Born: May 2, 1928 (age 98); Chicago, Illinois, U.S.
- Occupations: Screenwriter, author, playwright
- Years active: 1963–present
- Children: 4, including Francesca and Anne

Mayo Simon (born May 2, 1928) is an American screenwriter, author, and playwright.

He is the father of the author Francesca Simon and biologist-X-Files science advisor Anne Simon. His mother, Laura Simon (1905–2014), was an author and painter who wrote a memoir, I'm Still Here, aged 100.

== Select filmography ==
- Man from Atlantis (1977) (pilot episode)
- Futureworld (1976)
- Phase IV (1974) (original screenplay)
- Marooned (1969) (screenplay)
- Why Man Creates (1968) (conceived and written with Saul Bass)
- I Could Go On Singing (1963) (screenplay)

== Select plays ==
- Happiness - Lincoln Center
- L.A. Under Siege (1970) - Mark Taper Forrum
- Elaine's Daughter - Actors Theatre of Louisville
- The Twilight Romance (2003) - Falcon Theatre
- Greek Holiday (2003) - Payright's theatre
- The Old lady's Guide to Survival - Actors Theatre of Louisville
- These Men (1980) - Bush theatre
- Walking to Waldheim - Lincoln Center
- A Rich Full Life (1985) - L.A. Theatre Center
- Going West (2010) - Shooting Star Theatre

== Books ==
- The Audience and the Playwright (2003)
