= Francesca Simon =

American-British author (born 1955)

Francesca Simon MBE
- Born: Francesca Isabella Simon; 23 February 1955 (age 71); St. Louis, Missouri, U.S.
- Education: Yale University; Jesus College, Oxford
- Occupation: Writer
- Years active: 1963–present
- Notable work: Horrid Henry; Evil Evie
- Spouse: Martin Stamp
- Children: Josh Stamp-Simon
- Father: Mayo Simon
- Relatives: Anne Simon (sister)
- Writing career
- Genre: Children's literature
- Website: francescasimon.com

Francesca Isabella Simon (born 23 February 1955) is an American-born British author. She wrote the Horrid Henry series of children's books.

She is the daughter of screenwriter and playwright Mayo Simon.

== Biography ==
Simon was born on 23 February 1955 in St. Louis, Missouri. She grew up in California. Simon is Jewish has described Friday-night Shabbat dinner as a regular family practice during her childhood, often shared with family friends. She studied at Yale University and Jesus College, Oxford, where she read medieval studies and Old English. Simon worked as a journalist, writing for The Sunday Times, The Guardian, Mail on Sunday, The Daily Telegraph and Vogue (US). She is married to an English husband, Martin Stamp, and has one son called Joshua (born August 1989).

Simon was inspired to write by Anthony Trollope. She began to write children's books full-time in 1989. Simon is one of the UK's best-selling children's writers; she has published more than 50 different books, including her most popular Horrid Henry series, which has sold more than 21 million copies and has been translated into 31 languages. Simon got the idea for Horrid Henry when she was asked by Judith Elliott, an editor at Orion Books, to write a story about a horrid child. She also wanted to write about sibling rivalry and families where one child was considered "perfect" and the other "horrid". Inspiration also came from Cain and Abel, Oedipus Rex, Seinfeld, and Simon's own childhood, growing up in California the eldest of four siblings (including her sister Anne), desperately wanting to be an only child. They lived in small houses with confined spaces, with their father Mayo writing upstairs and telling them to be quiet. Many of the books' stories were inspired by events from Simon's life and those of people that she knew, with additional ideas coming from her imagination.

Simon lives in London with her husband, Martin. Their Tibetan spaniel, Shanti, is memorialised in the short story "Shanti" that Simon wrote for inclusion in the Paws and Whiskers anthology by fellow author Jacqueline Wilson published in February 2014.

In the spring of 2019, the Royal Opera House staged an opera based on Simon's book The Monstrous Child, about the Norse god of the dead, Hel, as an angry teenager. The opera is composed by Gavin Higgins with libretto by Simon.

== Selected works ==
- Horrid Henry series, illustrated by Tony Ross, Orion Books, 1994 to 2015, 2019
- Simon, Francesca (1995). The Topsy Turvies. Illustrated by Keren Ludlow (1st ed.). Dial Press. ISBN 978-0803719699.
- Simon, Francesca (2012). The Topsy-Turvies (Early Reader). Illustrated by Emily Bolam. Orion Children's. ISBN 978-1444005127.
- Simon, Francesca (2014). The Lost Gods. Profile Books. ISBN 978-1846685668. – longlisted for the Guardian Prize, 2014
- Simon, Francesca (2017). The Monstrous Child (Paperback ed.). Faber & Faber Children's. ISBN 978-0571330270.
- Simon, Francesca (2017). Hack and Whack. Illustrated by Charlotte Cotterill. Faber & Faber Children's. ISBN 978-0571328710.

== Honours and awards ==
In 2008, Simon won the British Book Award for British Book Award The Children's Book of the Year with Horrid Henry and the Abominable Snowman. She is the first American to win this award.

Simon was appointed Member of the Order of the British Empire (MBE) in the 2023 New Year Honours for services to literature.
