= Babylon (The X-Files) =

- The X-Files episode
- Episode no.: Season 10; Episode 5
- Directed by: Chris Carter
- Written by: Chris Carter
- Production code: 1AYW04
- Original air date: February 15, 2016
- Running time: 44 minutes

Guest appearances
- Lauren Ambrose as Agent Einstein; Robbie Amell as Agent Miller; Eric Breker as SP Agent Brem; Stephen Lobo as Man in Suit; Shaine Jones as; Janet Kidder as Nurse; Artin John as Shiraz; Nina Nayebi as Noora; Garry Chalk as Mad Dog; Marci T. House as Angry Woman; William B. Davis as Cigarette Smoking Man; Bruce Harwood as John Fitzgerald Byers; Tom Braidwood as Melvin Frohike; Dean Haglund as Richard "Ringo" Langly

Episode chronology
← Previous "Home Again"	Next → "My Struggle II"
- The X-Files season 10

"Babylon" is the fifth episode of the tenth season of The X-Files. Written and directed by Chris Carter, it aired on February 15, 2016, on Fox. The episode is a monster of the week style plot unconnected to the overarching mythology of the series.

== Plot ==
In Texas, a young Muslim man prays and goes about his daily routine. After driving to a motel to meet a friend, they then head over to an art gallery called Ziggurat for an art opening, which is later revealed to have been showcasing controversial depictions of Muhammad considered offensive to Muslims. Prior to leaving the car, they hold hands and say a prayer and then walk into the gallery, which shortly thereafter explodes. One of the men, now presumed to be a suicide bomber along with his friend, survives but is incapacitated in a vegetative state. Meanwhile, other bombers are shown to be planning another attack.

Back in Washington, D.C., Mulder and Scully meet Agents Miller and Einstein, both younger counterparts to the agents (believer and skeptic) but Miller is more extreme. While Agents Miller and Einstein leave to solve the bombing in Texas, Mulder asks Einstein (instead of Scully due to her recent loss) to meet up with him while Scully meets Miller in Texas.

Mulder and Einstein's relationship starts off rocky due to Einstein's extreme skepticism. Scully and Miller get along well but clash with bigoted Homeland Security agents who try to silence him. The agents try to find a way to communicate with the vegetative bomber. Miller, who had worked with the FBI in Iraq, tries to speak with him in Arabic, while Scully checks his EEG for any subconscious reaction.

Arriving in Texas, Mulder comes up with an idea to communicate with the comatose bomber. Einstein gives Mulder psilocybin mushrooms, making Mulder high. He wanders into a rodeo themed bar where he dances and passes out after seeing The Lone Gunmen amongst the crowd. In his dreams Mulder is on a ship being beaten by the Cigarette Smoking Man. He sees the comatose man in his mother's arms. He speaks to Mulder in Arabic.

Mulder wakes up in a hospital and is scolded by Skinner. Einstein reveals that she had given Mulder a placebo, despite Mulder's objections considering his powerful and profound experience. Mulder later spots the bomber's mother hoping her presence would wake him up. However, the man dies. Agent Miller asks Mulder about his dreams, after trying to remember Mulder says, "Babil al funduq" which turns out to be the name of the hotel where the other bombers are hiding, Babylon Hotel. FBI SWAT agents arrive at the hotel and capture the bombers.

Mulder later questions human nature and their beliefs, but then hears a loud sound of trumpets, suggesting it is the voice of God.

== Casting ==
This episode features the return of The Lone Gunmen (portrayed by actors Tom Braidwood, Bruce Harwood and Dean Haglund) which had been announced in July 2015. Since the characters had been killed off in the ninth season, it was unknown how their characters would appear. Chris Carter explained that he would not reference The X-Files season 10 comics where The Lone Gunmen faked their deaths. The Lone Gunmen's appearance was nearly cancelled when casting directors were unable to find Dean Haglund after he moved to Sydney, Australia. Haglund learned of the search from Bruce Harwood at a convention in Connecticut. In the episode, they appear in Mulder's hallucination.

The casting of Lauren Ambrose and Robbie Amell as Agents Einstein and Miller was also announced in July 2015.

Eric Breker, who plays Agent Brem in this episode, previously appeared as several different characters in various episodes, including "Apocrypha", "Demons", "Emily" and "Christmas Carol".

== Reception ==
=== Ratings ===
In its initial broadcast in the United States on February 15, 2016, it received 7.07 million viewers, a decrease in viewership from the previous week of 8.31 million viewers.

=== Reviews ===
"Babylon" was met with mixed reviews from critics, and was faced with controversy over accusations that the episode was Islamophobic in its negative portrayal of Muslims and Islamic beliefs. On Rotten Tomatoes, the episode received a 69% approval rating and an average score of 6.54/10. The consensus reads: "The sloppy 'Babylon' represents an unfortunate stumble, but Mulder and Scully's interactions still offer fans enough incentive to tune in." Keith Uhlich, writing for Vulture, gave the episode a 4 out of 5 rating and stated that "On first glance, I found the whole affair aggressively unpleasant, but a second viewing snapped me around to overwhelmed admiration. The truth is surely somewhere in between". Zack Handlen of The A.V. Club awarded the episode a "B" and wrote: "Wanting to believe is maybe the most powerful drug there is, and it can work chaos or miracles, or something in between. At its best, "Babylon" is somewhere in between those two poles".
