= The X-Files season 10 =

Season of television series

The X-Files
- Season 10
- DVD and Blu-ray cover
- Starring: David Duchovny; Gillian Anderson; Mitch Pileggi
- No. of episodes: 6

Release
- Original network: Fox
- Original release: January 24 – February 22, 2016

Season chronology
- ← Previous; Season 9 Next → Season 11

The tenth season of the American science fiction television series The X-Files commenced airing in the United States on January 24, 2016, on Fox. The season consists of six episodes and concluded airing on February 22, 2016. When Fox initially announced the string of episodes, the network referred to them collectively as an "event series". After their release, Fox began referring to the episodes collectively as "season 10" on their website, as did streaming sites like Amazon Prime and Hulu, and myriad critics.

The season, which takes place fourteen years after the ninth season (2001–02) and seven years after the film The X-Files: I Want to Believe (2008), follows newly re-instated Federal Bureau of Investigation (FBI) agents Fox Mulder (David Duchovny) and Dana Scully (Gillian Anderson) as they learn more about the existence of extraterrestrials and their relationship with the government.

Ever since The X-Files: I Want to Believe debuted in theaters, there was talk of a third X-Files movie to wrap-up the series' remaining storylines. However, for years these talks never resulted in action until on March 24, 2015, Fox announced that the series would return as a short-format event series with six episodes. After the season aired, it received mixed reviews from critics. The second, third, and fourth episodes were met with mostly positive comments, with "Mulder and Scully Meet the Were-Monster" receiving overwhelmingly positive comments. Conversely, the first, fifth, and sixth episodes were largely derided by critics. The mythology episodes, in particular, were poorly received.

== Plot overview ==
Fourteen years after the closure of the X-Files and seven years after the events of I Want to Believe, Fox Mulder is contacted by Dana Scully at the behest of FBI Assistant Director Walter Skinner, who wants him to meet a right-wing online webcaster named Tad O'Malley. Mulder and Scully reunite in Washington, D.C., where they are picked up by O'Malley in his limousine. They meet a young woman named Sveta, who claims to have fragmented memories of having her fetuses stolen from her during alien abductions and to possess alien DNA.

O'Malley takes Mulder to a secret location where a triangular aircraft (referred to as an "ARV", or Alien Replica Vehicle) built from alien technology is being housed. Mulder now believes that Colonization and the alien invasion were all an elaborate hoax to distract. Instead, Mulder thinks it was a "conspiracy of men" who have used extraterrestrial technology on human parties for decades, and these events were subsequently made to look like alien abductions. Before O'Malley can go public with his claims, his website is shut down, the "ARV" craft and its scientists are destroyed by heavily armed men dressed in military uniforms, and a UFO intercepts Sveta while she is driving, destroying her car.

Scully reveals that Sveta's re-tested DNA sample confirms that she does in fact possess extraterrestrial DNA; a test Scully has performed on herself has revealed that she does as well. Mulder states that Sveta is the key to exposing the conspiracy and those responsible. They then receive an urgent summons from Skinner requesting them to meet him. The Cigarette Smoking Man, now alive in the present day, receives word via telephone that the X-Files have been re-opened.

Six weeks after the events of "My Struggle", Scully arrives at FBI headquarters to find that Mulder has disappeared after watching an excerpt from Tad O'Malley's online news broadcast. As Scully informs Skinner and Agent Liz Einstein of Mulder's absence, Mulder attempts to leave Washington—visibly unwell and badly bruised. O'Malley explains to Scully that he suspects that alien DNA has been injected into every American citizen in order to facilitate the widespread outbreak of the Spartan Virus. Designed to strip humans of their immune systems, this contagion quickly manifests itself nationwide, with Scully and Einstein noting a sharp increase in the number of patients admitted to hospitals and triage centers.

Agent Kyd Miller finds a phone-tracking app on Mulder's computer and notes his position in Spartanburg, South Carolina. Scully receives a phone-call from former X-Files agent Monica Reyes to meet with her. Reyes reveals that Cigarette Smoking Man offered to secure both Scully and Reyes a place among the designated survivors of the end-times. Scully and Einstein attempt to develop a vaccine using Scully's DNA. Scully realizes that she is being protected from the contagion by a combination of the alien genomes that remained after she was abducted and experimented on, and the DNA anomalies instilled within her at the request of Reyes.

Mulder approaches Cigarette Smoking Man, who offers him a chance to survive the outbreak. Mulder declines, and is found by Miller, who returns him to Washington with the hope of finding a cure. Scully travels to Mulder and Miller's location, finding them at the 14th Street Bridge. Miller asks how Mulder will survive, Scully replies that William, their son, will have to be the donor of a stem cell transplant. Mulder begins to succumb to the virus. Suddenly, a beam of light shines down onto Miller, Scully, and Mulder, and a triangle-shaped UFO slowly descends and hovers above them. The episode ends with Scully looking at the lights of the spacecraft, shining down directly onto her and her partners.

== Cast ==
=== Main cast ===
- David Duchovny as Fox Mulder, an FBI special agent assigned to the newly reopened X-Files division. He remains a believer in the paranormal and the existence of extraterrestrial life, though, throughout the season, his faith begins to waver.
- Gillian Anderson as Dana Scully, a medical doctor and FBI special agent assigned to the X-Files. Although an initial skeptic, after Mulder's abduction, she became more open-minded about the possibility of extraterrestrial life.
- Mitch Pileggi as Walter Skinner, an assistant director at the FBI and an ally of Mulder and Scully. (Note: Only credited for the episodes he appears in.)

=== Recurring cast ===
- William B. Davis as Cigarette Smoking Man, a former government official, and nemesis of Mulder and Scully, who worked to cover up the truth of the existence of aliens and their plan to colonize the Earth.

=== Guest cast ===
- Joel McHale as Tad O'Malley, an Internet news anchor who is an ally of Mulder.
- Lauren Ambrose as Agent Liz Einstein, a medical doctor, Miller's partner, and a hard-skeptic.
- Robbie Amell as Agent Kyd Miller, an open-minded FBI agent who believes in the paranormal, and is Einstein's partner.
- Aliza Vellani as Sandeep, a nurse at the Our Lady of Sorrows Hospital. She acts as an assistant to Dana Scully.
- Annabeth Gish as Monica Reyes, an FBI special agent and ally to Mulder and Scully who was formerly assigned to the X-Files division.
- Bruce Harwood as John Fitzgerald Byers, a member of The Lone Gunmen.
- Tom Braidwood as Melvin Frohike, a member of The Lone Gunmen.
- Dean Haglund as Richard Langly, a member of The Lone Gunmen.
- Sheila Larken as Margaret Scully, Scully's mother.
- Annet Mahendru as Sveta, a victim of multiple alien abductions.
- Rhys Darby as Guy Mann, a shape-shifter.
- Kumail Nanjiani as Pasha, an animal control officer.

== Episodes ==
Episodes marked with a double dagger (‡) are episodes in the series' alien mythology arc.

No. overall	No. in season	Title	Directed by	Written by	Original release date	Prod. code	U.S. viewers (millions)
203	1	"My Struggle"‡	Chris Carter	Chris Carter	January 24, 2016	1AYW01	16.19
Mulder is contacted by Scully at the behest of FBI Assistant Director Walter Skinner, who wants him to meet a right-wing online webcaster named Tad O'Malley. O'Malley claims that the idea of an alien invasion is just a smoke-screen for nefarious government doings, and he claims to have proof.
204	2	"Founder's Mutation"	James Wong	James Wong	January 25, 2016	1AYW05	9.67
With the X-Files now re-opened, Mulder and Scully are assigned to investigate the mysterious suicide death of a geneticist. Their search leads them to a research facility where extreme genetic experimentation has bred subjects possessing strange powers.
205	3	"Mulder and Scully Meet the Were-Monster"	Darin Morgan	Darin Morgan	February 1, 2016	1AYW03	8.37
Mulder and Scully investigate mysterious killings seemingly perpetrated by a were-monster. Eventually, Mulder meets said "monster", a lizard-creature, who, after having been bitten by a human, turns into a human during the day.
206	4	"Home Again"	Glen Morgan	Glen Morgan	February 8, 2016	1AYW02	8.31
Scully returns home to cope with a personal tragedy leaving Mulder to solve a homicide that doesn't seem to have been committed by human hands.
207	5	"Babylon"	Chris Carter	Chris Carter	February 15, 2016	1AYW04	7.07
When an art gallery that's showing potentially offensive artwork is bombed, Mulder and Scully seek some way to communicate with the comatose bomber in order to prevent a future attack. Scully seeks answers from neuroscience and Mulder from mysticism.
208	6	"My Struggle II"‡	Chris Carter	Story by : Dr. Anne Simon & Dr. Margaret Fearon & Chris Carter; Teleplay by : Chris Carter	February 22, 2016	1AYW06	7.60
The investigations that Mulder and Scully previously began with conspiracy theorist Tad O’Malley have awakened powerful enemies. A widespread panic begins as people all over the country suddenly start falling gravely ill, and Scully must look within to try and find a cure. Meanwhile, Mulder confronts the man whom he believes to be behind it all, but another figure from Mulder and Scully’s past may prove to be the key to their salvation.

== Background ==
The X-Files aired from 1993 to 2002 on Fox and followed the efforts of federal agents Fox Mulder (David Duchovny) and Dana Scully (Gillian Anderson) as they investigated crimes linked to the paranormal. Following the series' seventh season, Duchovny scaled back his involvement substantially, appearing in only half of the eighth season's episodes, and only starring in two of season nine's. Likewise, during the ninth season, both Anderson and Carter had signed on at the last minute, with their contract extensions only lasting until the end of 2002, and Anderson specifically stated that she would leave the show following the conclusion of the season. During these final two seasons, FBI agents John Doggett (Robert Patrick) and Monica Reyes (Annabeth Gish) became the series' new leads. Executive producer Frank Spotnitz speculated that the show could extend into a tenth and possibly eleventh season, if the show was able to attract an audience. However, the show lost viewers and was eventually cancelled by Fox.

In 2008, both Duchovny and Anderson reprised their roles as Mulder and Scully in the film The X-Files: I Want to Believe. In several interviews around the release, series creator Chris Carter said that if The X-Files: I Want to Believe proved successful at the box office, a third installment would be made going back to the TV series' mythology, focusing specifically on the alien invasion and colonization of Earth foretold in the series finale, due to occur on December 22, 2012. In an October 2009 interview, Duchovny said he would want to do a 2012 X-Files film, but did not know if he would get the chance.

Anderson stated in August 2012 that a third X-Files film was "looking pretty good". At the October 2013 New York Comic Con, Duchovny and Anderson reaffirmed that they and Carter are interested in making a third film, with Anderson saying "If it takes fan encouragement to get Fox interested in that, then I guess that's what it would be." In January 2015, Fox Television Group chairman and CEO Gary Newman revealed that there was network interest in reviving The X-Files, not as a film franchise, but as a six-episode limited run.

== Broadcast ==
The season had a two-night premiere on Fox, debuting on Sunday, January 24, 2016, with the following episode airing on Monday at 8:00 pm, the timeslot in which the remaining episodes also aired. The premiere episode was screened at New York Comic Con on October 10, 2015.

Internationally, the season premiered in Canada on CTV on January 24, 2016, simultaneous with the American broadcast. It premiered in Ireland on RTÉ2 on January 26, 2016, two days after its U.S. premiere. It premiered in Australia on Network Ten on January 31, 2016. It premiered in the United Kingdom on Channel 5 on February 8, 2016, where it became the highest-rated drama in the channel's history.

Fox International Channels, where available, premiered the series the day after the American premiere.

== Production ==
=== Casting ===
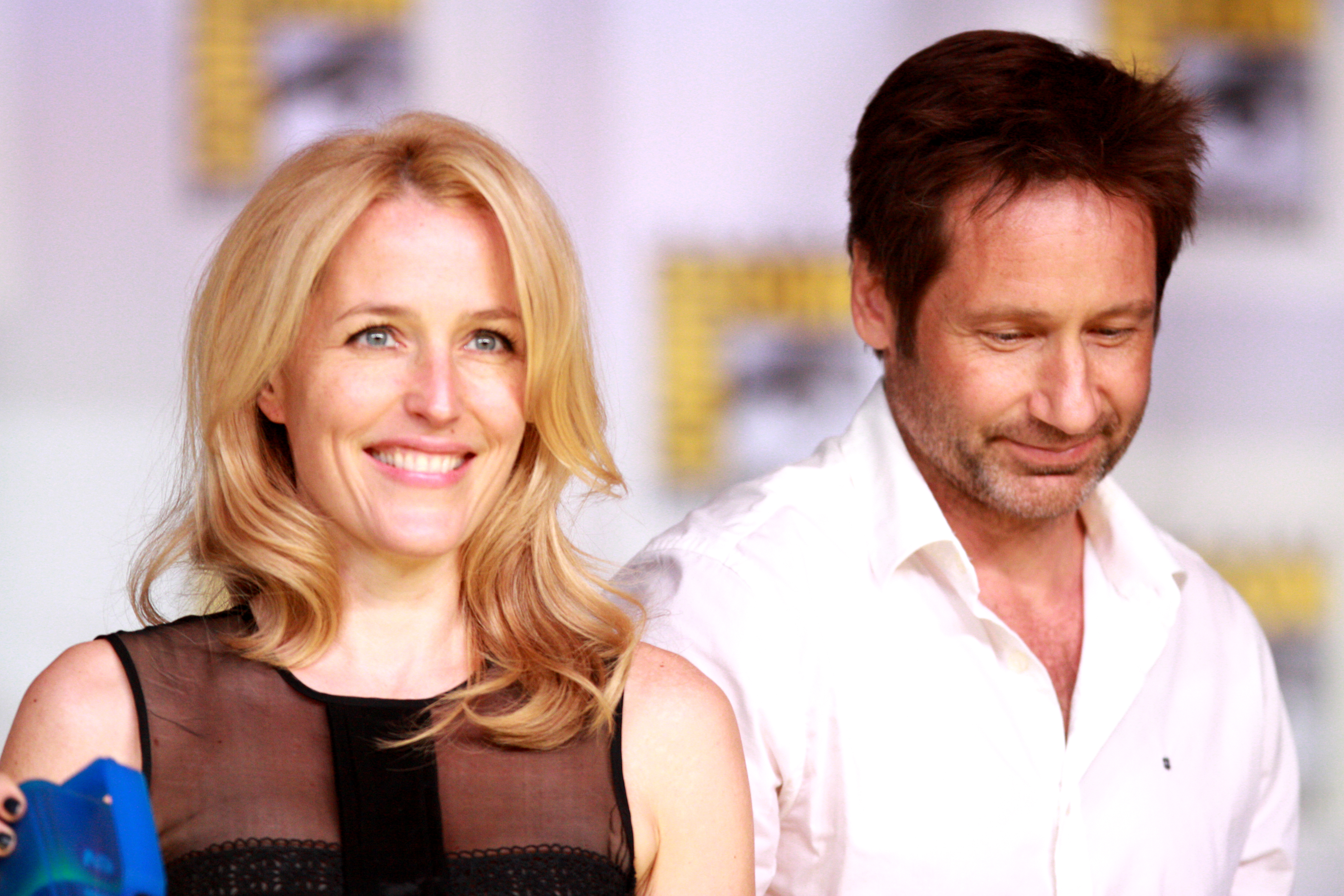
The revival features Gillian Anderson (left) and David Duchovny (right), pictured in 2013, reprising their roles as Dana Scully and Fox Mulder, respectively.

Once Newman revealed thoughts of bringing back the series, he noted that the revival would include "all key players": Carter, Duchovny, and Anderson. Fox TV Group chairman Dana Walden later noted that finding the ideal time that the three key members of the series were free would pose a challenge. At the time of the announcement, Duchovny was working on the NBC series Aquarius, and Anderson was involved in the BBC drama The Fall. However, both co-stars expressed their desire to return to the series: prior to Newman's announcement, Anderson said that she would be "fucking overjoyed" if Fox brought back The X-Files, and Duchovny said that he would be "more than happy" to reprise his role as Mulder.

In a later interview with GQ magazine, Anderson revealed that, when asked about returning for a television continuation of the program, she was hesitant, since she assumed the network would want to order over twenty new episodes (the length of a season when the show had originally aired). When it was revealed that the network would only order a short run, she enthusiastically agreed to reprise her role. Initially, Anderson was offered half the pay of Duchovny, but she negotiated her contract so that both leads received the same amount.

Early on, it was reported that an offer went out for Mitch Pileggi, who played Walter Skinner, to reprise his role, and that "other key cast members will also return." William B. Davis, the actor who portrayed Cigarette Smoking Man, also noted that he was asked about his availability during the summer of 2015, hinting that his character would return in some form. Later, Duchovny revealed during his March 31, 2015, appearance on Late Show with David Letterman that both Pileggi and Davis would return for the season. Pileggi confirmed his return in April 2015.

In an interview with XFilesNews.com, Carter expressed hope in having Robert Patrick and Annabeth Gish reprise their roles as John Doggett and Monica Reyes, respectively, although their involvement would be contingent upon their current acting commitments. Patrick ruled out a return, but it was confirmed in August 2015 that Gish was returning for at least one episode. Laurie Holden did not rule out a return as Marita Covarrubias, but did not appear in any of the episodes. Joel McHale was announced as a guest star in June 2015, playing Tad O'Malley, an Internet news anchor who is an ally of Mulder's. Carter chose to cast McHale after his roast of Barack Obama at the 2014 White House Correspondents' Dinner.

=== Writing ===
We're going to tell X-Files the way that we've always told them; we will of course set them in the time and place that they exist. We're telling contemporary stories about contemporary situations, true to Mulder and Scully's characters and their relationship and the passage of time.

— Chris Carter, on the nature of The X-Files revival.

Carter himself was also confirmed to be helming the project, serving as writer and executive producer. Carter later confirmed that Darin Morgan and James Wong would return to the series as writers, and Glen Morgan would return in a "productorial position". Wong and Glen Morgan had served as writers for the series during its first, second, and fourth seasons, and Darin Morgan had provided several scripts for the series during its second and third seasons. Following the announcement of the season, it was speculated as to whether long-time Carter collaborator Frank Spotnitz would return to assist with the writing, although this did not come to pass. In addition, former X-Files writer Vince Gilligan noted that he would have enjoyed returning to the series, but his busy work schedule did not allow it; he later said, "I'll be watching every episode and rooting them on".

Mark Snow also reprised his role as the series' composer. "There are some new musical elements I've brought in for certain moments in the episodes," said Snow. "It's difficult to describe what is so completely different about them, except that there are some different sounds, different pulsing percussion elements, and different ambient designs, but the basic harmonic structure from the past is fairly intact."

Prior to filming, Carter explained that he had "ideas for every [character]" and that the season would strive to tell fresh stories in a "very new political environment". He explained that, since the original conclusion of the series back in 2002, he had been collecting noteworthy news stories for future use. Carter revealed that the seasons' plot has no connection to the Season 10 comic book series, and is composed of both mythology episodes, as well as stand-alone "Monster-of-the-Week" episodes. It was later confirmed by Carter that the first and sixth episodes would be mythology episodes, and others would be standalones. Carter wrote the teleplays and directed the first, fifth, and sixth episodes.

The second, "Founder's Mutation", was written and directed by James Wong. The third, "Mulder and Scully Meet the Were-Monster", was written and directed by Darin Morgan. The fourth episode, titled "Home Again", was written and directed by Glen Morgan. Scientist and biology professor Anne Simon, who first consulted on the series' first-season finale episode "The Erlenmeyer Flask", and for the rest of the original series run, returned as a biology science advisor. She later received writing credit for her contributions to the finale. A seventh episode, based on a spec script, was written. It was not produced due to scheduling conflicts. According to Carter, if Fox orders more episodes, this unfilmed episode will be made.

=== Filming ===
In March 2015, it was claimed by several sources that the network would order a short-run season of fewer than ten episodes, with an initial guess of six. The decision to cut the order down to only a few installments was reportedly done so that the network could work around the busy schedules of Duchovny and Anderson. Duchovny said he had no interest in doing a full season because: "We're all old, we don't have the energy for a full season." The article claimed that, if all went as planned, the season would begin filming in the summer of 2015. It was confirmed by both Davis and Carter that the series would return to Vancouver for filming. Filming began on June 8 and finished on September 3.

== Reception ==
=== Reviews ===
Critical reception to this season has been mixed. The first and last episodes were met with lukewarm to negative reviews from critics, whereas episodes two through five were generally well received. Overall, the review aggregator Metacritic gave it a score of 60 out of 100 based on 35 reviews, indicating "mixed or average" reviews. Likewise, Rotten Tomatoes gave the revival a 64% approval rating with an average score of 6.5 out of 10 based on 180 reviews. The site's consensus reads, "Gillian Anderson and David Duchovny's chemistry remains intact, but overall, The X-Files revival lacks the creative spark necessary to sustain the initial rush of nostalgia."

"My Struggle" debuted to a select crowd at the 2015 New York Comic Con, and critical reception was mostly positive. Sadie Gennis of TV Guide wrote, "The episode immediately establishes that this is not a reboot nor a mere cash grab, but a thoughtful continuation of the beloved franchise." Chris Eggerstein of HitFix wrote that the tone of the revival was very reminiscent of the show's original run, and that "if you were a fan of the old X-Files, you're probably going to like the new X-Files just fine." Jane Mulkerrins of The Telegraph called the debut "fresh" and "one of the highlights" of the convention. Furthermore, she noted that the premiere was popular with fans, who greeted the episode with a standing ovation.

Pre-release reviews of "My Struggle" released after the New York Comic Con were more critical, with the consensus of many reviewers being that the first episode was not good. Reviewing the premiere episode, Brian Lowry of Variety panned the revival of the series, "It's simply hard to escape the prevailing malaise of this being a deal-driven exercise, a chance to cash in on the name recognition of the title in a format that mitigated the time commitment for all concerned." Similarly, Tim Goodman, writing for The Hollywood Reporter, described the premiere as "a very underwhelming hour that will force even diehard fans [...] to consider whether pushing onward is really worth the time.

Matt Fowler of IGN awarded it a 7.2 out of 10, denoting a "good" episode. Fowler wrote positively of Sveta's performance, and he also applauded the focus on the conspiracy as well as the episode's ending. However, he criticized it for having a "bored, disinterested tone". Alex McCown of The A.V. Club reviewed the first three episodes of the revival and awarded them collectively a "B+". He largely derided the first episode, writing that "it indulges in all of [Chris Carter's] worst [writing] tendencies." He was particularly critical of the episodes's expository monologues. Ultimately, he wrote that "the first episode demonstrates some of The X-Files' weaker tendencies, though it possesses a hokey charm, one that comes from pretending as though the past 15 years of television never happened."

Pre-release reviews of the following two episodes were much more positive. McCown argued that it "immediately course corrects" with Wong's "Founder's Mutation"; he called the episode "smart" and "unsettling". McCown lauded Morgan's "Mulder and Scully Meet the Were-Monster", writing that the episode ultimately "makes the case for why The X-Files is still worth having around." Brian Tallerico of RogerEbert.com wrote that "Founder's Mutation" "perfectly blends show mythology (including Mulder and Scully's kid) with a modern plot" and that "Mulder and Scully Meet the Were-Monster" is "hysterical, smart and so much fun". Darren Franich of Entertainment Weekly reiterated these thoughts, arguing that "Founder's Mutation" is "an improvement over the premiere", and that Darin Morgan's episode is "a wild, playful, brain-twisting, heart-pulling, and above all adventurous episode of television."

The X-Files season 10: Critical reception by episode
Season 10 (2016): Percentage of positive critics' reviews tracked by the website Rotten Tomatoes

=== Ratings ===
Before the season even began filming, an anonymous network insider revealed that Fox was interested in reviving the series because it would be a ratings success, noting: "The network feels that they can draw huge numbers and a PR drive to bring back a show which offers both drama and a built-in cult following." It was speculated that the success of the 24: Live Another Day event series, which aired in 2014, inspired Fox to revive The X-Files.

"My Struggle" debuted on January 24, 2016, and was watched by 16.19 million viewers. It scored a 6.1 Nielsen rating in the 18- to 49-year-old demographic. Nielsen ratings are audience measurement systems that determine the audience size and composition of television programming in the United States, which means that 6.1 percent of all individuals aged 18- to 49-years old were watching at the time of the episode's airing. In terms of viewers, this made "My Struggle" the highest-rated premiere, since the seventh season opener "The Sixth Extinction" in 1999, which was viewed by 17.82 million people. It was the most-watched episode of The X-Files to air since the eighth season episode "This Is Not Happening" in 2001, which was watched by 16.9 million viewers. When DVR and streaming are taken into account, "My Struggle" was seen by 21.4 million viewers, scoring a 7.1 Nielsen rating. The second episode, "Founder's Mutation", was viewed by 9.67 million.

Viewership and ratings per episode of The X-Files season 10
No.	Title	Air date	Rating/share (18–49)	Viewers (millions)	DVR (18–49)	DVR viewers (millions)	Total (18–49)	Total viewers (millions)
1	"My Struggle"	January 24, 2016	6.1/19	16.19	2.2	5.28	8.3	21.47
2	"Founder's Mutation"	January 25, 2016	3.2/10	9.67	1.9	4.71	5.1	14.38
3	"Mulder and Scully Meet the Were-Monster"	February 1, 2016	2.7/8	8.37	1.8	4.56	4.5	12.93
4	"Home Again"	February 8, 2016	2.5/8	8.31	1.6	3.66	4.1	11.97
5	"Babylon"	February 15, 2016	2.1/7	7.07	1.6	3.47	3.8	10.9
6	"My Struggle II"	February 22, 2016	2.4/7	7.60	1.3	3.47	3.7	11.07

=== Awards and nominations ===
Ceremony	Category	Nominee(s)	Result
42nd Saturn Awards	Best Science Fiction Television Series	The X-Files	Nominated
42nd Saturn Awards	Best Actor on Television	David Duchovny	Nominated
42nd Saturn Awards	Best Actress on Television	Gillian Anderson	Nominated

== Future ==
In an interview with Entertainment Weekly, Duchovny mentioned that, if the season were successful, he would be interested in filming another: "I would be open to doing another cycle. I don't know that I could do a 20-episode version of this show at this point in my life, and I don't know that Gillian could. But I think everybody is open ended on what happens after this. Certainly, we didn't bring it back with the idea of ending it." At the 2016 Television Critics Association panel for the series, Carter stated, "If we do well in the ratings, I can't imagine we wouldn't be asked to do more."

Fox Television Group chairman and CEO Gary Newman stated that he and fellow executive Dana Walden would be open to another renewal, stating, "We would love to do this again, so we'd be on board if schedules can be worked out." In an interview with Variety prior to the premiere, Anderson, Duchovny, and Walden stated their willingness for another renewal. On April 20, 2017, Fox announced that The X-Files would be returning for an eleventh season, with ten episodes, to air in the 2017–18 television season, after filming in mid-2017.

== Home media release ==
The season was released on Blu-ray and DVD in region 1 in June 2016. Special features include deleted and extended scenes; a gag reel; several featurettes – "The Makings of a Struggle", "Season X: An In-Depth Behind-the-Scenes Look at The Event Series", "Monsters of the Week: A Recap from the Wildest and Scariest from the Original Series", "The X-Files – Green Production PSA" and "Short Film – Grace by Karen Nielsen". There were three audio commentaries – "Founder's Mutation" with Chris Carter and James Wong, "Mulder & Scully Meet the Were-Monster" with David Duchovny, Gillian Anderson, Kumail Nanjiani and Darin Morgan and "My Struggle II" with Chris Carter and Gabe Rotter.

== Bibliography ==
- Shapiro, Marc (2000). All Things: The Official Guide to the X-Files Volume 6. Harper Prism. ISBN 0-06-107611-2.
