= Eric Breker =

Canadian actor

- Born: Humboldt, Saskatchewan, Canada
- Occupation: Actor
- Years active: 1992–present

Eric Breker is a Canadian actor from Humboldt, Saskatchewan, best known for his recurring role as Colonel Albert Reynolds across 16 episodes of the science fiction television series Stargate SG-1 (1998–2007). He has also appeared in Battlestar Galactica, The X-Files, The Dead Zone, and Arrow, among other genre television productions, and starred in the independent film Captive (2013).

== Early life ==
Breker is from Humboldt, Saskatchewan. He began acting in high school, crediting actor and director Gord McCall and the touring company Shakespeare on the Saskatchewan with introducing him to theatre. He worked with Shakespeare on the Saskatchewan in the summer of 1988. The following year he enrolled at the National Theatre School of Canada in Montreal, joining the school's incoming class in the fall of 1989 alongside fellow Saskatchewan actor Karen Turner. He completed one year at the school before relocating to Victoria, British Columbia, to pursue stage work.

== Career ==
=== Theatre ===
In Victoria, Breker built a stage career through the first half of the 1990s. He played the title role in Theatre Inconnu's 1992 production of Georg Büchner's Woyzeck. In 1994 he originated the role of executed Second World War spy Frank Pickersgill in the Belfry Theatre's premiere of Bill Penner and Jim Read's Night and Fog. The following year he played the lead, Bob, in the Chemainus Theatre's production of Beau Jest.

After relocating to Vancouver, Breker continued to take stage roles between screen jobs, including Gerry Mackay in the Firehall Arts Centre's 2001 production of Michael Lewis MacLennan's The Shooting Stage and Billy in Ron Chambers's Respectable, also at the Firehall Arts Centre, in 2002.

=== Television and film ===
By the mid-1990s Breker had moved into screen work, appearing in several episodes of The X-Files during the period the series filmed in Vancouver. By 1998, with the show having relocated its production away from the city, he continued auditioning for principal roles, including on the series Dead Man's Gun and First Wave, and lost out for a part in the Sam Elliott feature One Last Town. He credited Vancouver casting director Stewart Aikens with several of these auditions.

He first appeared on Stargate SG-1 as Major Reynolds in the second-season episode "Touchstone", broadcast on Showtime on October 30, 1998. In a 2024 interview, Breker recalled producer Robert C. Cooper telling him the production wanted "an intelligent officer" rather than a stock military type for the part, (Note: Breker also recalled in the same interview that the character began as a Sergeant and was promoted to Major, Lieutenant Colonel, and finally Colonel over the course of the series. The contemporary "Touchstone" episode credit identifies him as a Major in his debut appearance.) and that the character, subsequently named Albert Reynolds, eventually took command of the recurring team SG-3. He went on to appear in 16 episodes through 2007 and reprised the role in the direct-to-video film Stargate: The Ark of Truth (2008).

On Battlestar Galactica, Breker played the captain of the Gemenon Traveler in the first-season episode "Flesh and Bone" (2005) and the civilian George Chu in the second-season episode "Sacrifice" (2006).

Breker has continued to work as a Vancouver-based actor. He played Sergeant Macready on Primeval: New World and a one-episode role as Leo Mueller in the first-season Arrow episode "Damaged", and has also had guest roles on series including The Andromeda Strain, The 100, DC's Legends of Tomorrow, The Man in the High Castle, and The Magicians. He took the lead role of corrupt detective John Rancour in the independent film Captive (2013). He played Mugger #1 in a 2003 episode of The Dead Zone titled "Deja Voodoo" and John Smith, Johnny's grandfather, in a 2006 episode titled "Panic", and returned to The X-Files as Agent Brem in the 2016 revival episode "Babylon".

== Personal life ==
In July 1994, Victoria's Times Colonist reported that Breker, then also performing on the western Canadian Fringe-festival circuit, had become engaged to fellow actor and advertising model Jenny Matechuk. He married in early 1998, travelling to Australia for the wedding.

Breker has worked for years as a contractor carpenter alongside his acting career, which he discussed in a 2024 interview by comparing notes with his Stargate SG-1 co-star Don S. Davis, who held the same dual career.
