= Home Again (The X-Files) =

- The X-Files episode
- Episode no.: Season 10; Episode 4
- Directed by: Glen Morgan
- Written by: Glen Morgan
- Production code: 1AYW02
- Original air date: February 8, 2016
- Running time: 44 minutes

Guest appearances
- Tim Armstrong as Trashman; Sheila Larken as Margaret Scully; Daryl Shuttleworth as Daryl Landry; Peggy Jo Jacobs as Nancy Huff; Alessandro Juliani as Joseph Cutler; Chris Shields as Detective Dross; Gary Sekhon as Forensic Tech; Sachin Sahel as Jack Budd; Veena Sood as Dr. Louise Colquitt; Jannen Karr as Nurse Taillie; Seth Whittaker as Fitzpatrick; Daniel Jacobsen as Proudley; John DeSantis as Band-Aid Nose Man

Episode chronology
← Previous "Mulder and Scully Meet the Were-Monster"	Next → "Babylon"
- The X-Files season 10

"Home Again" is the fourth episode of the tenth season of The X-Files. Written and directed by Glen Morgan, it first aired February 8, 2016, and guest stars Tim Armstrong as Trashman, Sheila Larken as Margaret Scully, and Veena Sood as Dr. Louise Colquitt.

The episode is a monster of the week style plot unconnected to the series wider Mythology.

== Plot ==
Mulder and Scully are sent to investigate the murder of a city official, which it seems no human could have committed. At the crime scene, Scully receives a phone call from her older brother Bill, in Germany, telling her that their mother had a heart attack, causing her to leave and visit her. At the hospital, she again receives another call from her older brother asking for his mother's condition, and also learns that her mother had changed her living will, stating not to attempt resuscitation if she is unconscious or on life support. Mulder then meets Scully, who tells him that her mother had asked for Charlie before falling into coma and had changed her living will without consulting. Shortly afterwards, her mother is extubated and Scully receives a phone call from her younger brother, Charlie, who talks to their mother on speaker. Upon hearing Charlie's voice, her mother suddenly opens her eyes and then holds Mulder's hands and says "my son is named William, too", dying shortly afterwards.

Back at their investigation, Mulder and Scully then track down a mysterious creature known as the Band-Aid Nose Man. He is a force of destruction — ripping bodies apart — but the cause of the rage is complicated. The creature is the inadvertent creation of a street artist named Trashman, who drew the image of a defender of the homeless. Trashman claims the Band-Aid Nose Man is a "thought form". Meanwhile, Scully has flashbacks about her and Mulder's child, William, who was placed for adoption for his protection.

After identifying city official Landry as the last victim, Scully, Mulder and the Trashman head to Franklin Hospital to prevent him from being killed by the Band-Aid Nose Man. There, Landry starts smelling a very unpleasant odour and goes to an off-limits corridor, where he is confronted by the creature. He tries to flee, and in doing so, he enters a room where he is attacked by the creature. Seconds later, the agents and the Trashman arrive in the room, only to find Landry's dismembered body and no signs of the creature, prompting Scully to question how the creature left the room, given there is only one exit door and Landry's shouts were heard a few seconds ago.

The episode ends with Mulder and Scully at a beach talking about Scully's interpretation of her mother's dying words, where she tells Mulder that her mother had asked for her brother, despite him being out of her mother's life, because her mother was responsible for him, as they, Mulder and Scully, are for their son, William.

== Production ==
"Home Again" was written and directed by executive producer Glen Morgan. Guest stars include Tim Armstrong as Trashman, Sheila Larken as Margaret Scully, and Veena Sood as Dr. Louise Colquitt. Morgan was inspired to cast Armstrong because he is a fan of the punk rock band Rancid. Sood previously appeared as a different character in the first-season episode "Shadows".

== Reception ==
"Home Again" was met with positive reviews from critics. On Rotten Tomatoes, the episode received an 85% approval rating and an average score of 7.7/10. The consensus reads: "'Home Again' blends dramatic performances and spooky fun, all in service of a storyline that sends the characters on a dark, personal journey."

Alan Sepinwall of HitFix called the episode "more representative of the original series' meat-and-potatoes substance, and was a terrific example of that."

In its initial broadcast in the United States on February 9, 2016, it received 8.31 million viewers, a slight decrease in viewership from the previous week of 8.37 million viewers.

== See also ==
- "Arcadia", a sixth-season episode which also features a tulpa or thought form
