= Anne Simon =

American biologist

Anne Simon is an American biology professor, scientist, and a science advisor on the American television series The X-Files, for both the original nine season run and the 2016 revival. The first episode of the original series that she provided science consultation on was the first-season finale "The Erlenmeyer Flask", which was telecast on May 13, 1994. She became involved with the series through her connection as a family friend of series creator Chris Carter. She wrote a 2001 book about the biological science of the show, The Real Science Behind the X-Files: Microbes, Meteorites and Mutants (ISBN 0-684-85618-2).

Her father is screenwriter and playwright Mayo Simon, and her sister is Horrid Henry author Francesca Simon. She received her BA in biology (magna cum laude) from the University of California San Diego in 1978 and her PhD in genetics from Indiana University in 1982.

Simon's primary research is on virus replication and symptom expression using the model virus Turnip crinkle virus. She is a professor at the University of Maryland, College Park in the Department of Cell Biology and Molecular Genetics. Dr. Simon also heads the Virology Program at UMd, and is a senior editor of the Journal of Virology.
