= Walter Skinner =

X-Files character

- The X-Files character
- First appearance: "Tooms" (April 22, 1994)
- Last appearance: "My Struggle IV" (March 21, 2018)
- Portrayed by: Mitch Pileggi
- City: Washington, D.C.

In-universe information
- Occupation: FBI Special Agent, Assistant Director of the FBI
- Family: Sharon Skinner
- Agents: Dana Scully; John Doggett; Fox Mulder; Monica Reyes
- Affiliations: Alvin Kersh; The Lone Gunmen; Brad Follmer; C. G. B. Spender
- Duration: 1994–2002, 2008, 2016, 2018
- Seasons: 1 • 2 • 3 • 4 • 5 • 6 • 7 • 8 • 9 • 10 • 11
- Films: The X-Files, The X-Files: I Want to Believe

FBI Assistant Director Walter Sergei Skinner is a fictional character portrayed by American actor Mitch Pileggi on The X-Files and its short-lived spin-off The Lone Gunmen, both broadcast on Fox.

In the science fiction-supernatural series, Skinner supervised the X-Files office, which is concerned with unresolved FBI cases of mysterious or possibly supernatural circumstances. Fox Mulder, the FBI agent in charge of the X-Files, considers the X-Files the truth behind the supposed conspiracy. Skinner was a main character in the ninth, tenth and eleventh seasons of the show and a recurring character throughout the first eight seasons.

Skinner made his first appearance in the first season 1994 episode "Tooms". At the start of the series, Skinner was dismissive towards Mulder's belief in extraterrestrial and other strange phenomena. However, throughout the series Skinner has moved on to respect and agree with Mulder, who is finally proven correct in "Requiem", when Skinner sees an alien spacecraft. Skinner has received critical acclaim and has become a fan favorite.

Pileggi received the role of Walter Skinner after "two or three" auditions for the role. Beginning with only a small cameo, his character frequently made more appearances during the second season.

== Character arc ==
Skinner is a former Marine and a Vietnam War veteran. In the war he once killed a boy at a very short distance, an experience which has scarred him for life. He is married to Sharon Skinner. He has been treated at a sleep disorder clinic, suffering from recurring dreams of an old woman, which may either be a hallucination arising from drug use during Vietnam or a succubus. Skinner's hobbies include jogging and boxing, the latter of which has been shown in his ability to outfight Fox Mulder and X and to defend himself reasonably well when he was attacked by Alex Krycek and his men.

Skinner took personal administrative charge of the X-Files in the latter half of Season 1, replacing Section Chief Scott Blevins. Initially, Skinner acts solely as a supervisor to Agent Mulder and Dana Scully's investigations of the paranormal. In the early episodes, it is unclear whether he is entirely independent of his actions or controlled by men such as the "Cigarette Smoking Man". Eventually, Skinner begins trusting Mulder and Scully and becomes their ally, saving both of their lives on multiple occasions. He stands up to the conspirators that tried to control him, for which he frequently pays throughout the series.

After Skinner has long broken free of the "Cigarette Smoking Man", he is again forced to take orders, this time from Alex Krycek. He is covertly infected with nanotechnology, which gives Krycek the leverage to control him. Two years later, Skinner is finally able to rid himself of Krycek, when during an attempt by Krycek on Mulder's life, Skinner fatally shoots Krycek. At Mulder's murder trial, Skinner is asked to act as Mulder's lawyer, having become a supporter of Mulder's cause. Later, Skinner and Deputy Director Alvin Kersh confront the "Toothpick Man" in Kersh's office, after Agents John Doggett and Monica Reyes discover that the X-Files office had been emptied out. This results in another, apparently permanent, closing of the X-Files division. Six years later, with the X-Files still closed down, Skinner assists Scully in finding Mulder after he goes missing while consulting on the FBI's investigation into the disappearance of a missing agent. Mulder and Skinner are shown to still be on friendly terms, despite Mulder's animosity towards the FBI for the events following the trial.

When Season 10 begins in 2016, 8 years after he assisted Scully in finding Mulder in 'X-Files:I Want to Believe' Skinner is shown to still be working at the FBI as Assistant Director. He convinces Mulder and Scully to return to active duty, and re-opens the X-Files. He sets up the meeting between Mulder and Tad O'Malley, setting up the key mythology for the season. Although he plays a limited role in this season, he appears in Babylon, reprimanding Mulder for crossing the line by using drugs. In 'My Struggle II', Skinner is present when Scully realises that Mulder is missing.

In Season 11, Skinner plays a more main role within the Mythology episodes. In 'My Struggle III', Scully is hospitalised, and Skinner works alongside Mulder to find out what happens. He decodes the abnormal brain scans and discovers Scully's brain is sending a message in morse code that reads: "Find him", referencing her son, William. When leaving the hospital, he is ambushed by and held at gunpoint in his car by Monica Reyes and Cigarette Smoking Man. CSM offers Skinner a dark "deal with the devil". Help him find William, and receive immunity from the upcoming Spartan Virus that he has designed to wipe out humanity. It is also revealed to Skinner that CSM is the biological father of William, and he used alien technology to artificially impregnate Scully. When he returns to the hospital, Mulder smells cigarette smoke on him and they fight each other in the hospital room. Mulder demands to know which side Skinner is on, but Skinner doesn't reveal anything, instead he leaves. In the second episode, 'This' Skinner is shown to be an ally, but still distrusted by both Mulder and Scully. He advises them to surrender, and travels to the woods to help them. He provides them with information about the group that is pursuing them and gives them some money, as they refuse to travel with him by car. He later meets with them, and provides them with access to online scans of X-File cases. In 'Ghouli' (11x05) Skinner tries to protect Mulder and Scully from going into a deeper government trap by advising them to stop investigating the top-secret test files that Jackson Van de Kamp had. Mulder, however, refuses Skinner's orders. He then reveals to Skinner that Jackson was actually William. Kitten (11x06) focuses on Skinner as a character, and his backstory. He receives a human ear in the mail, and subsequently goes missing. It is revealed that during the period that he served in the Vietnam war, he was tasked with guarding a top-secret crate that accidentally leaks a chemical gas, causing his squadmate John 'Kitten' James to hallucinate and see monsters, driving him to kill many people. Skinner feels guilt for this, as he stayed quiet to protect his career, letting Kitten end up in a mental institution for decades. He travels to Mud Lick to investigate, but ends up falling into the trap set out by Kitten's vengeful son Davey, and gets stabbed in the stomach by a wooden spike. He is rescued by Mulder and Scully. At the end of the episode, he declares his ultimate loyalty to Mulder and Scully, explaining that it is not their fault that he has not moved up the rankings in the FBI. The season ends with 'My Struggle IV' In which Skinner plays a role. He is pressured by Director Alvin Kursh to shut down the X-Files due to the information leak about the man made pathogen. He then joins Scully in the hunt for William (and Mulder), directly disobeying Kursh and choosing his loyalty to Scully and Mulder. Skinner and Scully follow Mulder's car to a factory. Whilst Scully goes off to find Mulder and William, Skinner spots CSM and Monica Reyes in a car. He steps out to block their car, drawing the gun and aiming for the windshield. Monica attempts to stop the car, not wanting to kill Skinner, but CSM seizes the wheel, and accelerates towards Skinner. He stands his ground, and shoots Monica in the head. He tries to dive out of the way of the car, but CSM ruthlessly hits Skinner. It has not been confirmed whether Skinner was killed or survived the incident.

== Conceptual history ==
=== Creation and development ===
"I've done a number of interviews and I've told a number of people this, and I don't know if it's flattering or what to my father, because it's, I base a lot of the, you know, the character's based a lot on my father. I lost my dad about a year and a half ago, and I loved him a lot, he was very, very important in my life. But he was a man in a position very much like Mr. Skinner is."
— Mitch Pileggi talking about his character's development.

The role of Walter Skinner was played by actor Mitch Pileggi, who had unsuccessfully auditioned for two or three other characters on The X-Files before getting the part. At first, the fact that he was asked back to audition for the recurring role slightly puzzled him, until he discovered the reason he had not previously been cast in those roles — Chris Carter had been unable to envision Pileggi as any of those characters, due to the fact that the actor had been shaving his head. When the actor had attended the audition for Walter Skinner, he had been in a grumpy mood and had allowed his small amount of hair to grow back. Pileggi's attitude fit well with Walter Skinner's character, causing Carter to assume that the actor was only pretending to be grumpy. After successfully auditioning for the role, Pileggi thought he had been lucky that he had not been cast in one of the earlier roles, as he believed he would have appeared in only a single episode and would have missed the opportunity to play the recurring role of Walter Skinner.

Pileggi himself thought he got the role because of Gillian Anderson's (who portrayed Dana Scully) pregnancy during the second season, saying the producers felt they needed to take the "show in a different direction" while she was pregnant. So Pileggi felt at the start that he "compensated" for the situation of the show, and after a while the character started to grow on the producers and fellow cast, as Pileggi puts it, "the character just started kind of clicking and working". At the end of the second season, the producers wanted Pileggi to return in future episodes, so he signed a six-year contract with them.

In an interview with X-Files fan site host Robin Mayhall, Pileggi commented once that he felt David Duchovny's (portrayed Fox Mulder) semi-departure in season eight and the introduction of Robert Patrick's John Doggett, and the fact that he started to believe in Aliens at the end of season seven, Skinner was given the "opportunity to grow", further stating "new avenues" had been opened. While Pileggi stated that he missed Duchovny's presence in The X-Files, he continued saying that he did not have the opportunity to work with him during the seventh season. He even went as far as saying that there was no "interaction between" the two characters. He was positive to the new storyline conceived during Duchovny's departure, saying it gave the show a "shot in the arm," which reinvented the show.

=== I Want to Believe ===
As writers Carter and Frank Spotnitz aimed to avoid complicating the storyline of The X-Files: I Want to Believe with superfluous appearances of characters from the television series, Skinner is the only returning character in the movie. He was included in the film's plot only when a fitting opportunity to involve him arose, and Spotnitz and Carter were very happy to write Skinner into the story. The scenes of The X-Files: I Want to Believe that include Skinner were filmed very late in the movie's filming schedule, and the particular scene that acts as the character's introduction in the movie was filmed, for reasons of time, in two different locations.

== Reception ==
The character received critical acclaim from fans and critics alike and since became a fan's favourite of the show. Mitch Pileggi received acclaim for his portrayal of the character.

While not winning or getting nominated for any of his work alone in The X-Files, Mitch Pileggi and several other cast members were nominated in the category "Outstanding Performance by an Ensemble in a Drama Series" by the Screen Actors Guild Awards in 1997, 1998 and 1999 but did not win. Following the broadcast of "One Breath", in which Skinner recalls serving as a US Marine during the Vietnam War, Pileggi received several fan letters from Vietnam veterans. Ben-Rawson Jones named the character of Skinner a "Spy cult icon" in 2008, describing him as the "corporate middle man".

George Avalos and Michael Liedtke from the Contra Costa Times both reacted positively to the death of Alex Krycek at the hands of Skinner, saying it was the best scene of the eighth-season finale, "Existence". Another review from the same site and writers said the season eight episode, "Via Negativa", said the story "clicked" largely thanks to Skinner along with Alvin Kersh, saying that Skinner "delivered another Mulderesque". In a review of The X-Files feature film, Soren Andersen from The News Tribune said the character was "underused" both in the series and film. Entertainment Weekly reviewer Bruce Fretts said Skinner brought "a real element of danger to the show."
