= The X-Files: I Want to Believe =

2008 science fiction film

- Theatrical release poster
- Directed by: Chris Carter
- Written by: Chris Carter; Frank Spotnitz
- Based on: The X-Files by Chris Carter
- Produced by: Chris Carter; Frank Spotnitz
- Starring: David Duchovny; Gillian Anderson; Amanda Peet; Billy Connolly; Alvin 'Xzibit' Joiner
- Cinematography: Bill Roe
- Edited by: Richard A. Harris
- Music by: Mark Snow
- Production companies: Crying Box Productions; Dune Entertainment III; Ten Thirteen Productions
- Distributed by: 20th Century Fox
- Release date: July 25, 2008
- Running time: 104 minutes
- Country: United States
- Language: English
- Budget: $30 million
- Box office: $68.4 million

The X-Files: I Want to Believe is a 2008 American supernatural thriller film directed by Chris Carter, and written by Carter and Frank Spotnitz. It is the second feature film installment of The X-Files franchise created by Carter, following the 1998 film. Three main actors from the television series, David Duchovny, Gillian Anderson, and Mitch Pileggi, reappear in the film to reprise their respective roles as Fox Mulder, Dana Scully, and Walter Skinner.

Unlike the first film, the plot does not focus on the series' ongoing extraterrestrial-based mytharc themes, but instead works as a standalone thriller horror story, like many of the monster-of-the-week episodes frequently seen in the TV series, as well as focusing on the personal relationship between Mulder and Scully. The story follows Mulder and Scully who have been out of the FBI for several years, with Mulder living in isolation and Scully having become a doctor at a Catholic hospital, where she has formed a bond with a critically ill child patient. When an FBI agent is mysteriously kidnapped and a former Catholic priest who has been convicted of pedophilia claims to be experiencing psychic visions of the endangered agent, Scully is asked to bring Mulder back to the bureau to consult on the case because of his work with psychics. The narrative goes through the push and pull of his at-first reluctant involvement and Scully's attempts to stay out of it.

The film was first anticipated in November 2001 to follow the conclusion of the ninth season of the television series, but it remained in development hell for six years before entering production in December 2007 in Vancouver, British Columbia, Canada. The film premiered on July 23, 2008, at Grauman's Chinese Theatre in Hollywood before opening theatrically two days later on July 25. The worldwide gross was $68.4 million from a $30 million budget. It received mixed reviews; critics praised the chemistry between Duchovny and Anderson while criticizing the plot.

A director's cut of the film, titled The X-Files: I Want to Believe – Vrach Frankenshteyn, which restores horror elements that were removed from the original release, was released on Hulu and Disney+ on August 14, 2026.

== Plot ==
Six years after the closure of the X-Files, Dana Scully, a former FBI Special Agent, is now a staff physician at a Catholic hospital; she is treating Christian, a young boy with symptoms similar to Sandhoff disease. FBI Special Agent Mosely Drummy approaches Scully for help in locating her former partner, Fox Mulder, who has been in hiding as a fugitive for several years. Drummy states that the FBI will call off its manhunt for Mulder if he helps investigate the disappearances of several women in West Virginia, the latest of whom is a young FBI Special Agent named Monica Bannan. Scully agrees and convinces a reluctant Mulder to help.

The duo is taken to Washington, D.C., where Special Agent Dakota Whitney requests Mulder's expertise with the paranormal as they have been led to a severed human arm, by Father Joe, a priest defrocked for the molestation of thirty-seven altar boys, who claims God is sending him visions of the crimes. A second woman is run off the road by a truck driven by Janke Dacyshyn, who then abducts her. After a grueling nighttime search in a snow-covered field, Father Joe leads the FBI to a frozen burial ground of people and body parts. Analysis of the remains, along with tracking down the recent movements from the second abducted woman's car crash, eventually leads them to Dacyshyn, an organ transporter in Richmond, Virginia, and his husband, Franz Tomczeszyn, who was among the youths Father Joe sexually abused.

Father Joe tells Scully not to give up, which she interprets as a sign to pursue experimental stem cell research to treat Christian. Mulder suspects that she is associating Christian with their son, William, who was given up for adoption. Her decision places her at odds with the hospital's Catholic board, but she pushes on even when Christian's parents ask to stop his treatment. She argues that Mulder is becoming too invested in the paranormal again, and she cannot live that life any more.

During an FBI raid on the organ donor facility where Dacyshyn works, he escapes, leaving Bannan's severed head at the scene. Mulder, who accompanied Whitney on the raid, chases Dacyshyn to a building construction site. Whitney follows and is killed when Dacyshyn pushes her down an elevator shaft. Scully, seeking a resolution, asks Joe, who has not yet heard of the discovery of Bannan's head, if he senses that she is still alive, and he replies that she is. Discouraged but still determined, Mulder follows Dacyshyn, who runs his car off the road. Mulder survives and tails Dacyshyn, who exits his truck after the engine fails, to a small compound in a former barn. Mulder enters, and the commotion caused by a two-headed guard dog brings Dacyshyn out from one of the buildings. The compound is being used by an Eastern European medical team that has been murdering people and stealing their organs for years. The field where Father Joe discovered the bodies was their dumping ground. Mulder enters the building to find that the team has used the organs and body parts to keep Tomczeszyn alive. At that moment, they attempt to place Tomczeszyn's head on the body of the second abducted woman. Mulder tries to save her from the gruesome fate, but a doctor injects him with a tranquilizer. Helpless, Mulder is taken outside to be murdered by Dacyshyn.

Scully, unable to reach Mulder on his cell phone, contacts her old FBI superior, Assistant Director Walter Skinner, for help. They triangulate the phone's location and find Mulder’s wrecked car, eventually making their way through the snow to find the compound as Mulder is about to be axed by Dacyshyn. Scully incapacitates him while Skinner stops the medical procedure before the young woman is beheaded.

Later, Mulder is at home when Scully tells him Father Joe has died. It happened at the same moment, Mulder notes, that Scully disconnected the life support to Tomczeszyn's severed head. Somehow, he surmises, the two men's fates were linked by more than just visions. He encourages Scully to listen to her instincts in relation to Christian's treatment, and she goes ahead with his surgery.

== Cast ==
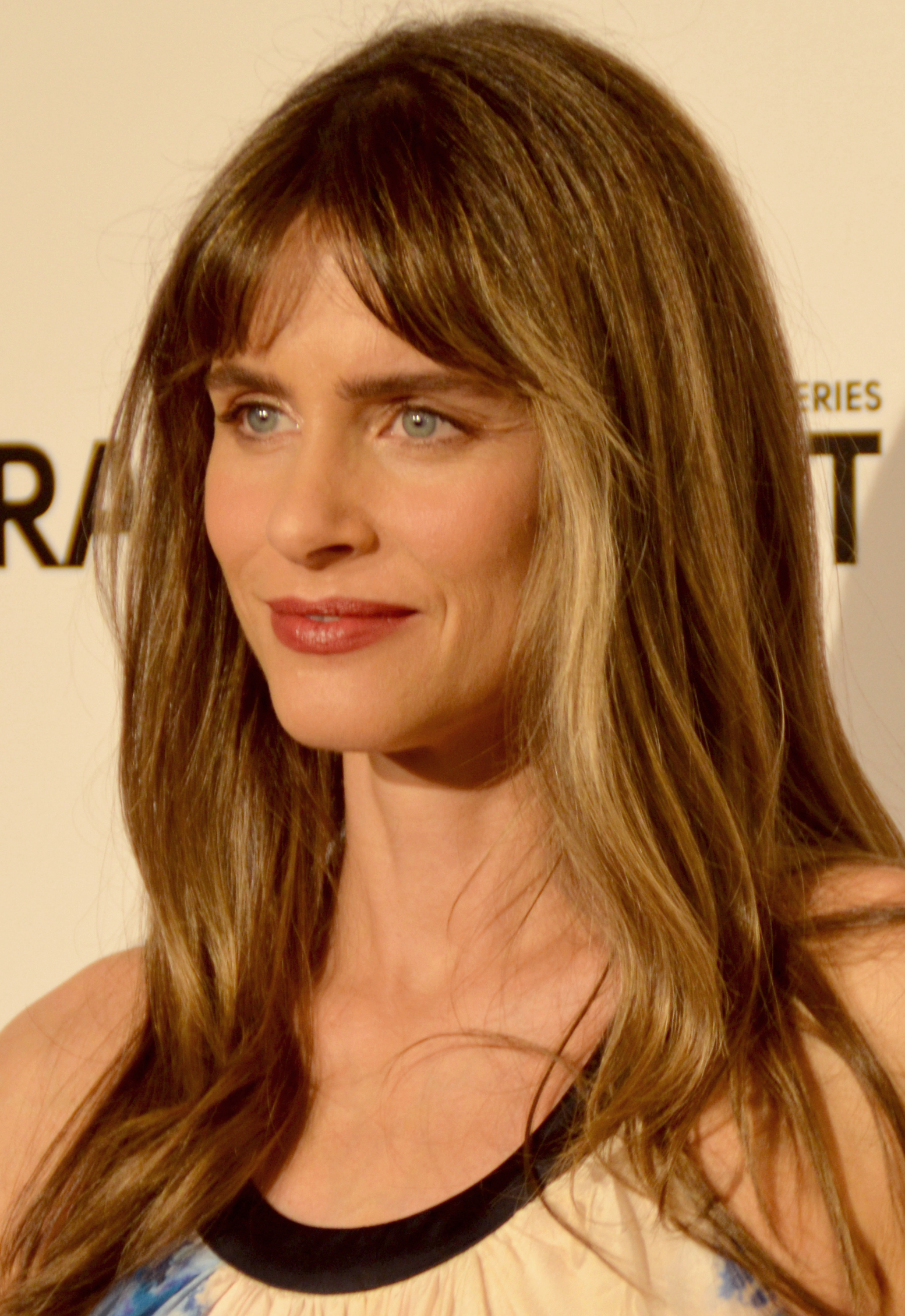
Supporting actress Amanda Peet portrays FBI Agent Dakota Whitney

- David Duchovny as Fox Mulder
- Gillian Anderson as Dana Scully
- Amanda Peet as Special Agent in Charge Dakota Whitney
- Billy Connolly as Joseph "Father Joe" Crissman
- Alvin 'Xzibit' Joiner as Special Agent Mosley Drummy
- Mitch Pileggi as Assistant Director Walter Skinner
- Callum Keith Rennie as Janke Dacyshyn
- Adam Godley as Father Ybarra
- Xantha Radley as Special Agent Monica Bannan
- Fagin Woodcock as Franz Tomczeszyn
- Nicki Aycox as Cheryl Cunningham
- Alex Diakun as Gaunt Man

== Production ==
=== Development ===
In November 2001, the creators of the TV series The X-Files decided to pursue a second feature film adaptation of the series, following the 1998 film. Carter was expected to collaborate with Spotnitz, who had co-written the first film, on a script for the follow-up. Production of the film was slated to begin after the completion of the ninth season of the TV series, with a projected release in December 2003. In April 2002, Carter reiterated his desire and the studio's desire to do a sequel film. He planned to write the script over that summer and begin production in the spring or summer of 2003 for a 2004 release. Carter described the film saying, "We're looking at the movies as stand-alones. They're not necessarily going to have to deal with the mythology." Director Rob Bowman, who had directed episodes of The X-Files in the past as well as the 1998 film, expressed an interest in filming the sequel in July 2002.

In April 2004, Duchovny said he was waiting for the film's production to begin, explaining that Carter had signed off on the premise. Duchovny said of the delay, "So now it's just a matter of making sure everybody can get together at the same time and do it." The following November, Carter revealed that the project was in the negotiation stage, explaining, "Because it's a sequel, there are peculiar and specific kinds of negotiations that are holding us up." Duchovny spoke of the premise for the yet-produced film in 2005, "Mulder and Scully investigate one particular case that has nothing to do with alien life. It has to do with supernatural stuff." He also explained, "I think we're going back to the 'monster of the week' type feel, where if you're not an avid fan and don't understand the mythology, you can still come to it and get the movie." Duchovny and Carter planned to begin production in the winter of 2005 to be released in the summer of 2006. The following April, Duchovny admitted to a lack of a script, adding that Carter would have it ready by early next year.

In May 2006, Spotnitz blamed the continued delay on legal matters between Carter and 20th Century Fox. The screenwriter anticipated, "Once the legal issues are over with, we will go on with it. I'm hoping it will get resolved soon." By April 2007, Spotnitz confirmed that a script was finally in development. The following October, the studio officially announced the production of the sequel film, whose premise would be kept under wraps.

=== Filming ===
Principal photography took place in Vancouver and Pemberton, in British Columbia, Canada. According to Spotnitz, the script was written specifically for these locations. Filming began in December 2007 in Vancouver under the direction of Carter, and shooting finished on March 11, 2008. In a teaser trailer shown at Wondercon on February 23, 2008, the date "July 25, 2008" appeared at the end, and was the only text in the trailer. On March 27, 2008, the horror film site Bloody Disgusting reported a bootleg video of the official trailer uploaded by a user on YouTube. The first public trailer was released after midnight on May 12, 2008, after a period of downtime on the official website.

The decision to shoot in Vancouver, where the first five years of The X-Files had been filmed and produced before the series had moved to Los Angeles, was an early idea—one that seemed right to both Chris Carter and David Duchovny. According to Duchovny, "It all makes sense. You know, when Chris and I first talked about doing this movie, we kind of unconsciously both said, 'You know, I guess it should be in Vancouver, it really should be,' and it just felt like you know, almost superstitiously like the right thing to do." Filming in Vancouver also facilitated the return of many former crew members who had previously worked on The X-Files, as well as individuals who had worked on the other series that Ten Thirteen Productions had created. Frank Spotnitz said that "In terms of making of the movie, we've brought together as many people as we can, not just from The X-Files but from all the shows that we did here in Vancouver – Harsh Realm, Millennium and The Lone Gunmen – and our crew is populated with all these faces that we'd worked with, over the past fifteen years. And there's even some people from the L.A. crew."

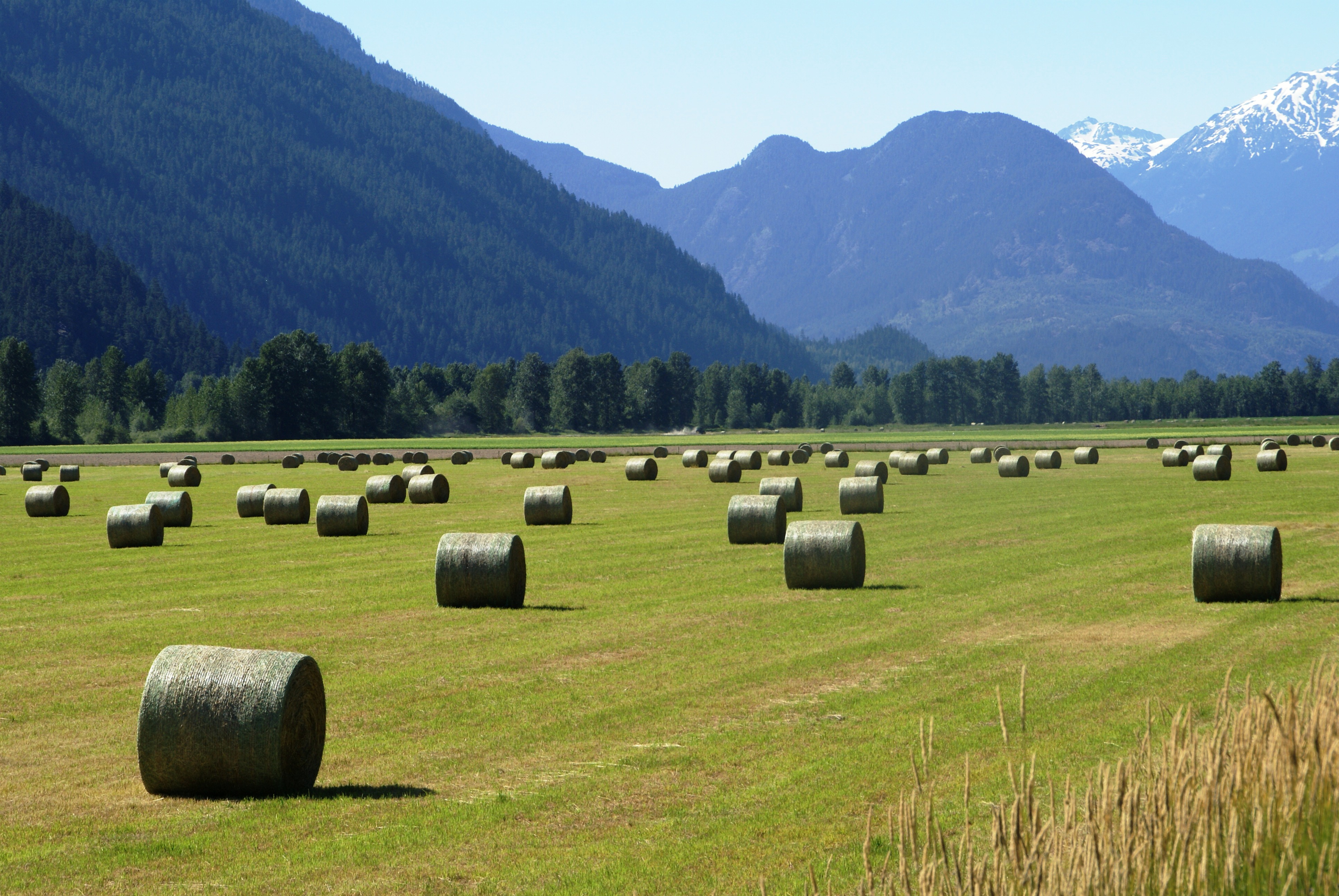
A haybale field in Pemberton, like the location used for filming the scene involving the abduction of Cheryl Cunningham.

The exterior of Monica Bannan's house was filmed in Pemberton, a location that Spotnitz found to be beautiful but extremely cold. Although the location is shown in exterior shots incorporated into the scene in which Fox Mulder (Duchovny), Whitney (Amanda Peet), Drummy (Alvin "Xzibit" Joiner), and Father Joe (Billy Connolly) drove to the missing agent's home, the same scene also includes footage of the actors that was filmed on a stage, using a rear projection to show the exterior from inside the car. The latter method was used for all the shots in which any of the travelers appear.

Several of the other locations were filmed in and around Pemberton Valley. Key scenes were also filmed in Riverlands. The interior of Mulder's home was a set in Burnaby, outside of Vancouver. The set was an old roller rink or at least sounded like one, as it was very noisy. During filming, Carter placed a carrot juice bottle on the table of the set, having just finished the drink, as he thought it would be "a nice sort of Mulder touch." Some of the artwork in Mulder's office came from a friend of Carter's who had a gallery in Vancouver and was named Monica Reyes, a name that had previously been used in her honor for a character who features in a recurring role in the series' eighth season and appears as a main character in every episode of the series' ninth season. One of the pictures on the wall of Mulder's office was by Douglas Coupland, who was featured in the real Monica Reyes' gallery and had written a book Carter liked which was called Hey Nostradamus!, so Carter stuck a Post-it on which he wrote the book's title onto the picture.

The exterior of the dorms for habitual sex offenders where Father Joe lives was an apartment complex in Vancouver that was slated for demolition while the production crew were filming there. Snow that can be seen outside the dorms was actually fake snow that was imported by the crew and fabricated by the film's Special Effects Department. Bill Roe and Mark Freeborn worked together to create a creepy green glow on the location using green lights. The production crew also created their own factory smoke for chimneys in the background, as Carter opined that the smoking chimneys made the location look like London. The interior of Joe's apartment was another set and was exactly like the real apartment except that it was slightly bigger. A trans-light was incorporated into the set to resemble daylight visible through a window of the apartment. The set also had a porch that was used for some shots in the scene where Mulder and Scully were outside the apartment. Additional filming was done in Coquitlam, another Vancouver suburb, at Riverview Hospital's Unit 8 building.

=== Title ===
The code name Done One was used as the film's working title during filming, with location signs labeled as "Done One Productions." The name meant the producers had already done one film. "The Crying Box Productions" was listed as the production company, instead of Carter's usual "Ten Thirteen Productions." The Hollywood Reporter posted a series of information sheets regarding upcoming studio films, and the 20th Century Fox fact sheet referred to the film as The X-Files: Done One.

On April 16, 2008, the official title of the film was announced: The X-Files: I Want to Believe. Carter referred to the title as a "natural title", saying that it pertained to "a story that involves the difficulties in mediating faith and science. 'I Want to Believe.' It really does suggest Scully's struggle with her faith." Carter also said that he and Spotnitz settled upon the title as soon as they started writing the screenplay. This title is a popular phrase among X-Files fans. It is featured on the UFO poster above Mulder's desk.

=== Music ===
After The X-Files was cancelled in 2002, Chris Carter and his crew started working with a goal of releasing a second X-Files film. In 2003, Carter called Mark Snow, who by that time lived in London, United Kingdom and said he wanted him to return for another film. Snow was positive to the idea, but filming got bogged down by contract issues between Fox and Carter. Once the contract issues were sorted out, Carter re-contacted Snow about the development, and later on sent him the script for the film. Carter and his production crew wanted as much secrecy for the film as possible, forcing Snow to sign a contract when receiving the script. After reading the script three times, Snow started on the "visuals" for the story. Snow initially wrote a couple of demos, with which Carter and Frank Spotnitz were not pleased, but they were eventually accepted when Snow re-recorded them.

When composing the score for I Want to Believe, Snow called it "different" from the previous film which followed the shows mytharc storyline about the government conspiracy and aliens. He said it was much "more heart, warmth and tuneful music" since this film was based more around Fox Mulder (David Duchovny) and Dana Scully's (Gillian Anderson) relationship.

Snow recorded the score with the Hollywood Studio Symphony in May 2008 at the Newman Scoring Stage at 20th Century Fox in Century City, California. This music was fully written out and orchestrated. When making the music, Snow used such instruments as the "battery of percussion" taiko drums and whistles with live singers among other things. It took four days to record with the orchestra. He used no trumpets and no high woodwinds when recording, but used up to eight french horns, five trombones, two pianos, one harp, thirty-two violins, sixteen violas, twelve cellos and eight basses.

British performers UNKLE recorded a new version of the theme music for the end credits to the film. Some of the unusual sounds were created by a variation of silly putty and dimes tucked in between and over the strings of the piano. Mark Snow also comments that the fast percussion featured in some tracks was inspired by the track "Prospectors Quartet" from the There Will Be Blood soundtrack.

== Marketing ==
=== Novel ===
A novelization by Max Allan Collins was released by Harper Entertainment on July 29, 2008.

== Release ==
=== Box office ===
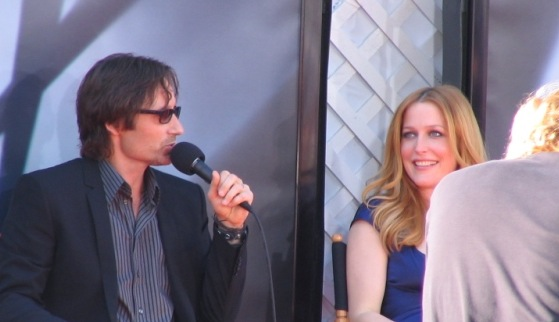
Duchovny and Anderson at the premiere

The film grossed $4 million on its opening day in the United States It opened fourth on the U.S. weekend box office chart, with a gross of $10.2 million. By the end of its worldwide theatrical run, it had grossed $20,982,478 domestically and an additional $47,386,956 internationally, for a total worldwide gross of $68,369,434. Among 2008 worldwide releases, it ended up in 78th place. As a domestic release, it finished in 114th place.

The film's stars both claimed that the timing of the movie's release, a week after the highly popular Batman film The Dark Knight, negatively affected its box-office return.

=== Home media ===
20th Century Fox Home Entertainment released the film on DVD and Blu-ray on December 2, 2008. The home release included an extended cut that adds an additional four minutes of footage into the movie, including extra violence and character moments. The most recent available data showed it has grossed $17,434,152 from U.S. DVD sales.

==== Director's cut ====
During an interview with David Duchovny released on June 3, 2025, Chris Carter revealed that he had been recently given the go-ahead to produce a director's cut for the film, with Carter further implying that the cut might be produced for streaming. Titled The X-Files: I Want to Believe – Vrach Frankenshteyn (Doctor Frankenstein in Russian), it was set to be released on Disney+ in June 2026 but was delayed to August 14, 2026, for Hulu, due to an unspecified technical issue.

=== Reception ===
Rotten Tomatoes reports that 32% of 168 listed film critics gave the film a positive review; the average rating is 4.79/10. The website wrote of the critics' consensus, states: "The chemistry between leads David Duchovny and Gillian Anderson do live up to The X-Files' televised legacy, but the roving plot and droning routines make it hard to identify just what we're meant to believe in." Metacritic, which assigns a normalized rating out of 100 reviews from mainstream film critics, reported that there were "mixed or average" reviews, with an average score of 47 based on 33 reviews. Audiences polled by CinemaScore gave the film an average grade of C on an A+ to F scale.

The X-Files: I Want to Believe arrives billed as a 'stand-alone' film that requires no familiarity with the famous television series. So it is, leaving us to piece together the plot on our own. And when I say 'piece together,' trust me, that's exactly what I mean.

— Roger Ebert, writing for the Chicago Sun-Times

Manohla Dargis of The New York Times found the film "baggy, draggy, oddly timed and strangely off the mark" and that "Mr. Carter knows how to grab your attention visually, but the amalgam of trashy thriller clichés that he has compiled with Frank Spotnitz, another series regular, creates its own deadening effect". Frank Lovece of Film Journal International, likewise said, "What plot there is plays like a PG-13 Se7en: body parts, gruesomeness, gloom and doom, but hey, not too much, and don't worry, there's nothing deeply upsetting", and while praising the cinematography, music and Gillian Anderson's performance, believes, "It seems unlikely that this franchise will reach The X-Files X". Jason Anderson of Canada's CBC News called the film "muddled" with a "hurried and half-baked" climax, and said, "Beyond the pleasure of seeing Duchovny and Anderson back in action and back on form," the film "offers little to either the longtime fans or newcomers". Jan Stuart from the Los Angeles Times commented, "The X-Files was a load of malarkey. But it was thoughtful malarkey and compulsively watchable. One could say the same about the first two-thirds of The X-Files: I Want to Believe before it spins out of control and into a delirious plane of awfulness." M. A. Crang, in his book Denying the Truth: Revisiting The X-Files after 9/11, praised the acting, locations and characterization but felt that the script was the film's "biggest weakness".

Roger Ebert gave a positive review of the film with three-and-a-half out of four stars, saying; "It involved actual questions of morality, just as The Dark Knight does. It's not simply about good and evil but about choices". He also felt "the movie works like thrillers used to work, before they were required to contain villains the size of buildings", also calling the film "a skillful thriller". Sandra Hall of the Sydney Morning Herald was more equivocal, saying, "... it just about works, thanks to Carter's sense of timing and the script's allegorical enhancements." Empire gave the film three stars ("good"), but expressed a desire for Chris Carter to return to the more comedic and "post-modern" elements of the series upon the next revisit. Stephanie Zackarek was mostly positive towards the film, saying; "I Want to Believe comes off like a solid if not great episode from one of the show's early seasons, a reasonably suspenseful story made by a director with a sturdy sense of how to tell a story." Mick LaSalle was also positive towards the film, saying that you didn't need to know anything about the previous settings and calling it a "compelling suspense thriller with some tense moments." TV Guide reviewer Maitland McDonagh gave the film two and a half stars out of four saying that the film was not "sufficiently gripping to transform a middling thriller into something truly provocative or haunting." About the theme and story she said, "such weighty concerns aren't the stuff of most mainstream genre movies."

In preparation for the miniseries continuation of the series, Keith Uhlich of The A.V. Club suggested The X-Files: I Want to Believe is "much better than its reputation suggests." He continues, saying: "It was never this writer’s opinion that I Want to Believe... was some worthless addition to X-Files canon. On first view, it seemed a very consciously low-key study of the Mulder/Scully dynamic, filtered, as per usual, through the prism of the latest mystery the agents were called in to solve. If Fight The Future, which dealt in grandiose fashion with the series’ convoluted alien myth arc, was The X-Files in summer blockbuster mode, I Want to Believe was its attempt at an intimate chamber drama – more Ingmar Bergman than Michael Bay."

In June 2025, Carter announced that he was working on a director's cut of The X-Files: I Want to Believe which would restore the original horror elements which were cut from the theatrical release due to studio and censor demands.

== Sequel ==
In several interviews that Carter gave around the time the film was released, he said that if I Want to Believe proved financially successful, a third installment would be made going back to the TV series' mythology, focusing specifically on the alien invasion and colonization of Earth foretold in the series finale, due to occur on December 22, 2012. Fox Chairman Tom Rothman, responding to an interview question regarding the possibility of a third X-Files movie, said in October 2008, "It's really up to Chris [Carter], David [Duchovny] and Gillian [Anderson]". During an interview at the Sarajevo Film Festival in August 2009, Anderson was asked about a third film and responded, "They talked about maybe doing it in 2012. I think there were discussions about that. I don't know whether that's going to happen or not, but there isn't any reason not to do it." Frank Spotnitz responded to his blog readers' requests for clarification regarding Anderson's comments by denying that any deal was in place, saying, "I'm afraid I have no news to report other than our continuing desire to make a third film if there's an audience for it." In an October 2009 interview, David Duchovny likewise said that he wanted to do a 2012 X-Files movie, but still did not know if he would get the chance.

In December 2009, Carter said he could not "ensure" another movie would be made, but thought the international box office for the 2008 film made it at least a theoretical possibility. In an interview published in August 2012, Spotnitz said he was talking up the idea of an X-Files movie every chance he got, but that there was still nothing happening on that front, and that time was running very short for a third movie concluding the original X-Files franchise to be made at all. He blamed the poor performance of the 2008 film on the fact that it was not about aliens. Speaking at San Diego Comic-Con in July 2013, Carter, when asked about a third film, was extremely noncommittal, indicating there was still no forward movement, and saying, "We can get to it later." In August 2013, Carter said, in an interview with Empire, that "It's really up to 20th Century Fox, whether they have the will to do it. I think all of us are interested in putting the band back together", adding that a third installment would be a return to the mythology and that the colonisation date of the television series would not be ignored.

In March 2015, it was confirmed that there would be a six-episode miniseries on Fox, featuring Duchovny, Anderson, and some other members of the original cast, which would have both standalone and mythology elements. In April 2017, it was announced the series would return with a ten-episode eleventh season, which premiered on January 3, 2018.
