= One Breath (The X-Files) =

- The X-Files episode
- Dana Scully is visited by the spirit of her father, during her near-death experience.
- Episode no.: Season 2 Episode 8
- Directed by: R. W. Goodwin
- Written by: Glen Morgan; James Wong
- Production code: 2X08
- Original air date: November 11, 1994
- Running time: 45 minutes

Guest appearances
- Sheila Larken as Margaret Scully; Melinda McGraw as Melissa Scully; Mitch Pileggi as Walter Skinner; Steven Williams as X; William B. Davis as The Smoking Man; Don Davis as William Scully; Bruce Harwood as John Fitzgerald Byers; Dean Haglund as Richard Langly; Tom Braidwood as Melvin Frohike

Episode chronology
← Previous "3"	Next → "Firewalker"
- The X-Files season 2

"One Breath" is the eighth episode of the second season of the American science fiction television series The X-Files. It premiered on the Fox network on November 11, 1994. It was written by Glen Morgan and James Wong, directed by R. W. Goodwin, and featured guest appearances by Melinda McGraw, Sheila Larken and Don S. Davis. The episode helped to explore the series' overarching mythology. "One Breath" earned a Nielsen household rating of 9.5, being watched by 9.1 million households in its initial broadcast. The episode received mostly positive reviews from television critics.

The show centers on FBI special agents Fox Mulder (David Duchovny) and Dana Scully (Gillian Anderson) who work on cases linked to the paranormal, called X-Files. In the episode, Scully is found comatose in hospital after her abduction in the earlier episode "Ascension". Mulder attempts to investigate what has happened to her, but finds himself hindered by a man he had believed to be an ally.

Anderson returned to the series only days after having given birth, missing the previous episode due to her pregnancy. Morgan and Wong attempted to create a version of the earlier episode "Beyond the Sea", this time centered on Duchovny's character Mulder. The episode also introduced the character of Melissa Scully, an attempt to provide a romantic lead for Mulder which was later dropped.

== Plot ==
=== Background ===
FBI special agent Dana Scully (Gillian Anderson) is currently missing, having disappeared after being kidnapped by a deranged multiple-abductee in the two-part episodes "Duane Barry" and "Ascension". Her partner Fox Mulder (David Duchovny) has continued his work without her, but is still investigating her disappearance, believing her to have been abducted by aliens. His investigations into similar abductions in the past have been aided by The Lone Gunmen, a trio of conspiracy theorists made up of John Byers (Bruce Harwood), Melvin Frohike (Tom Braidwood) and Richard Langly (Dean Haglund).

=== Events ===
Scully's mother, Margaret (Sheila Larken), tells Mulder a story about Dana shooting a snake with her brothers as a child and regretting what she did. She indicates that she is ready to let go of Dana and shows Mulder Scully's gravestone. Mulder, however, refuses to give up.

Scully then turns up mysteriously at a hospital in a coma. An out-of-control Mulder demands to know how she got there and is escorted out by security but calms down and meets with Dr. Daly (Jay Brazeau), who reveals that no one can figure out how she got there or what's wrong with her. At Scully's bedside, Mulder meets her older sister Melissa (Melinda McGraw).

Scully has a vision of sitting in a boat, attached by rope to a dock where Mulder and Melissa stand with the mysterious Nurse Owens behind them. Frohike visits Scully and sneaks out her medical chart, which the Lone Gunmen investigate. Byers finds that Scully's blood contains branched DNA that may have been used for identification but now is inactive and a poisonous waste product in her system.

Later, Mulder visits Scully while another nurse takes her blood. A mysterious man steals Scully's blood sample and runs. Mulder chases him to the parking lot where he is confronted by X, who demands that he stop pursuing what happened to Scully and let her die. X then executes the man who stole her blood. When Assistant Director Walter Skinner (Mitch Pileggi) calls Mulder to his office regarding the incident, Mulder denies any involvement and claims that The Smoking Man is responsible for what happened to Scully. Mulder demands to know where he is, but Skinner refuses to tell him.

In another vision, Scully lies on a table and is visited by her deceased father. Mulder, with Melissa in the hospital cafeteria, is asked by a woman for change for the cigarette machine. When she says that a pack of Morleys is already there and leaves, Mulder opens it and finds the Smoking Man's address inside. Mulder bursts into the Smoking Man's home and holds him at gunpoint, demanding to know why Scully was taken instead of him. The Smoking Man claims he likes both of them, which is why she was returned; he reveals that he told Skinner that Mulder shot the man in the parking lot, although he didn't believe this to be true, incidentally revealing himself as being unaware of who did, namely X. He tells Mulder that he'll never know the truth if he kills him, and Mulder decides not to.

Mulder returns to FBI headquarters and types a resignation letter that he hands to Skinner. Skinner visits his office as Mulder is packing and relates an out-of-body experience he had in Vietnam. He refuses to accept Mulder's resignation, and Mulder realizes that he was the one who provided him with the Smoking Man's location. Heading to the parking garage, Mulder is met by X, telling him that he'll have a chance for revenge that night when men, believing him to have information on Scully, will search his apartment. Mulder is waiting with his gun at his apartment when Melissa arrives. Although he initially refuses to leave, Melissa convinces Mulder to see Scully. While with Scully, Mulder holds her hand and talks to her. Returning home to find his apartment trashed, he sits on the floor and cries.

Scully awakens the following day, and Mulder is called to the hospital to see her, where she indicates that she heard his voice while in her coma, and he returns her cross necklace. Scully tells him she doesn't remember anything after being kidnapped by Duane Barry. Later, Scully asks one of the nurses if she can see Nurse Owens, but the nurse tells Scully that no nurse named Owens has ever worked at that hospital.

== Production ==
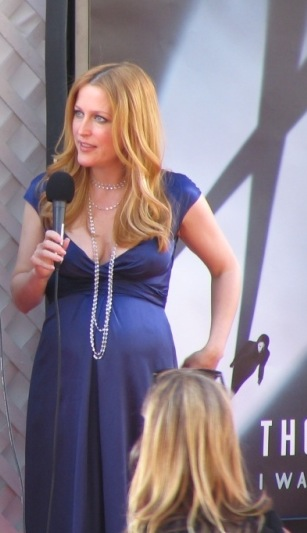
Anderson had given birth to her daughter days before filming "One Breath".

The episode title, "One Breath" comes from a line from Scully's father when he talks to her during the episode. The character 'The Thinker', who later appears in person in the episode "Anasazi" was named after online X-Files fan 'DuhThinker'. The episode introduces Melinda McGraw as Scully's sister Melissa. McGraw had previously worked with writers Glen Morgan and James Wong, who specifically wrote the part with her in mind. Thoughts were given to having a romantic interest between Mulder and Melissa, but the concept never came to pass.

Writer Glen Morgan said of the episode, "Duchovny challenged us to do a "Beyond the Sea" for him. The show had been so dark and bleak, and Jim and I feel that there is a side to the paranormal that's very hopeful. We wanted to do that side of it. I thought it would be a great opportunity for Duchovny, but then the situation came up with Gillian's pregnancy. We needed to get her off her feet anyway." Consequently, Gillian Anderson, who had just given birth to her daughter Piper days before this episode spent the majority of the episode in a hospital bed.

Chris Carter described the opening scene—in which Scully discovers the truth about death, sadness, and sorrow—as "a way he would never imagined an X-Files episode to begin with", and that the related scene with Scully's tombstone was "a soft but beautiful opening" that "sets up the episode in a frightening way". The image of Scully in the boat was meant to symbolize "being tethered to something very tenuously, and that there was a chance for you to be cut adrift and slip into the unknown". Skinner facing the Smoking Man placed the character as "both an antagonistic and institutional figure" that tries to be both an FBI agent and an ally of Mulder and Scully—his refusal to allow the Smoking Man to smoke in his office "speaks of [Skinner's] alliances and allegiances to Agent Scully and his hatred of this man he cannot vanquish, he cannot get rid of, but he has to tolerate".

== Reception ==
=== Ratings ===
"One Breath" premiered on the Fox network on November 11, 1994. The episode earned a Nielsen household rating of 9.5 with a 16 share, meaning that roughly 9.5 percent of all television-equipped households, and 16 percent of households watching television, were tuned in to the episode. A total of 9.1 million households watched this episode during its original airing.

=== Reviews ===
"One Breath" received mostly positive reviews from critics. Nina Sordi, writing for Den of Geek, ranked the episode as the eighth best in the series' run, calling it "just too unforgettable". Sordi added that "verbal sparring matches between Mulder and Scully's equally feisty sister, Melissa, created an interesting dynamic in the absence of Scully's perspective". Nick De Semlyen and James White of Empire named it the fifteenth "greatest" episode of the series, considering it a "testament to the X-Files writing staff's ability to turn the temporary loss of one of the stars into a compelling, suspenseful and worthwhile piece of the overall mythology".

In a retrospective of the second season in Entertainment Weekly, the episode was rated a B. Its "absurd symbolism and the introduction of Scully's dopey New Age sister" were criticized, but it was felt that these elements did not prevent "One Breath" from being a "richly layered installment". It was also felt that the episode featured "arguably Duchovny's best performance". Reviewer Zack Handlen of The A.V. Club hailed "One Breath" as an essential episode of the show. He felt that there was a "sloppiness to the mythology" and that "the resolution of the whole coma situation is weak". However, the "incredibly moving moments" and highlights such as Mulder attacking the Smoking Man and Skinner's speech about Vietnam turned it into an episode "more about the moments than the big picture".

In 1996, Chris Carter declared "One Breath" to be one of the series' most popular episodes. Co-writer James Wong also enjoyed the episode, saying "I really love that show". Director R. W. Goodwin said of the episode, "What's so unusual about "One Breath" is that it had very little to do with our usual X-File stuff. It was more about human emotions, drama, relationships".

=== Awards ===
"One Breath" earned a nomination for an Emmy Award by the Academy of Television Arts & Sciences for Outstanding Cinematography - Series.

== Bibliography ==
- Edwards, Ted (1996). X-Files Confidential. Little, Brown and Company. ISBN 0-316-21808-1.
- Lovece, Frank (1996). The X-Files Declassified. Citadel Press. ISBN 0-8065-1745-X.
- Lowry, Brian (1995). The Truth is Out There: The Official Guide to the X-Files. Harper Prism. ISBN 0-06-105330-9.
