= Excelsis Dei =

- The X-Files episode
- Scully is surrounded by mysterious apparitions. One critic referred to the ghostly effects as "eerie".
- Episode no.: Season 2 Episode 11
- Directed by: Stephen Surjik
- Written by: Paul Brown
- Production code: 2X11
- Original air date: December 16, 1994
- Running time: 44 minutes

Guest appearances
- Teryl Rothery as Michelle Charters; Sab Shimono as Gung Bituen; Frances Bay as Dorothy; Eric Christmas as Stan Phillips; David Fresco as Hal Arden

Episode chronology
← Previous "Red Museum"	Next → "Aubrey"
- The X-Files season 2

"Excelsis Dei" is the eleventh episode of the second season of the science fiction television series The X-Files. It premiered in the United States on the Fox network on December 16, 1994. It was written by Paul Brown and directed by Stephen Surjik. The episode is a "Monster-of-the-Week" story, unconnected to the series' wider mythology. "Excelsis Dei" earned a Nielsen household rating of 8.9, being watched by 8.5 million households in its initial broadcast. The episode received mixed reviews from television critics; although some complimented the episode's effects, others were critical of the way the show handled rape.

The show centers on FBI special agents Fox Mulder (David Duchovny) and Dana Scully (Gillian Anderson) who work on cases linked to the paranormal, called X-Files. Mulder is a believer in the paranormal, while the skeptical Scully has been assigned to debunk his work. In the episode Mulder and Scully are called in to investigate a claim of rape made by a nurse at a nursing home; the case falls into the purview of the X-Files because the assailant appears to have been a disembodied spirit.

Surjik personally asked if he could direct the episode because he was a fan of the series; this was his only credit for the series. Filming the episode was difficult for the cast and crew due largely to the fact that the script arrived for the cast and crew to film only two days in advance. Other issues arose because of technical reasons; one scene required flooding a hallway with 3,300 gallons of water. Many of the scenes were filmed at Riverview Hospital, a mental health facility located in Coquitlam, British Columbia.

== Plot ==
FBI agents Fox Mulder (David Duchovny) and Dana Scully (Gillian Anderson) are called to the Excelsis Dei nursing home in Worcester, Massachusetts, in order to investigate a nurse's claim that she was raped by an invisible entity. Severely bruised, Michelle Charters (Teryl Rothery) claims that she knows who was responsible and names the attacker as Hal Arden, an elderly resident with Alzheimer's disease. When questioned, Hal admits that he made sexual overtures to Michelle but claims that it was harmless and that he is too elderly to have done anything. In turn, the hospital's administrator believes that Michelle has manufactured the rape allegation in order to extort money from the nursing home.

As Mulder and Scully investigate, they discover that many of the facility's Alzheimer's patients have shown significant improvement over their condition, a development that is not medically possible. Their doctor, Grago, attributes the patients' improvement to regimen he has applied using Deprenyl, an experimental drug that has so far shown negligible effect in patient studies. Before Mulder and Scully can make much headway, Hal dies unexpectedly while his roommate, Stan Phillips, stands by, complicating the investigation further. Worried about her father, Stan's daughter arranges to move him back into her home, despite his angry insistence that he doesn't want to leave. An orderly tries to help Stan pack, but Stan flees the room and leads the orderly on a chase to the roof. The orderly follows Stan out of a window but falls or is pushed to his death before Mulder can save him.

Mulder and Scully eventually discover that a Malaysian orderly, Gung Bittuen, is dosing the patients with an herbal drug made of mushrooms he cultivates in the building's basement. He explains that in Malay culture, the elderly are revered and treated with respect; coming to the U.S., Gung was appalled to see how Westerners send their elderly away to places like Excelsis Dei, where—as Gung has seen firsthand—they are badly mistreated. Gung attempted to ease their suffering with the herbal drug but admits something has gone badly wrong. While the mushrooms are used in his country to "speak with the dead," the spirits lingering around Excelsis Dei are restless and angry, and the living residents' use of the mushrooms has given the spirits a power to act on that anger. The drug reverses the patients' Alzheimer's symptoms, but also allows them to channel the spirits, resulting in the assaults and murders.

As Stan, who stole all of Gung's herbal stash, overdoses and begins seizing, the spirits once again attack Charters, trapping her and Mulder in a flooding bathroom. Scully and Grago manage to stop Stan's seizures, at which point the spirits disappear and the bathroom door opens, freeing Mulder and Charters. The government of Massachusetts takes over the facility, and Gung is turned over to immigration services. The remaining original patients, no longer having access to the drug, revert to their previous state of dementia.

== Production ==
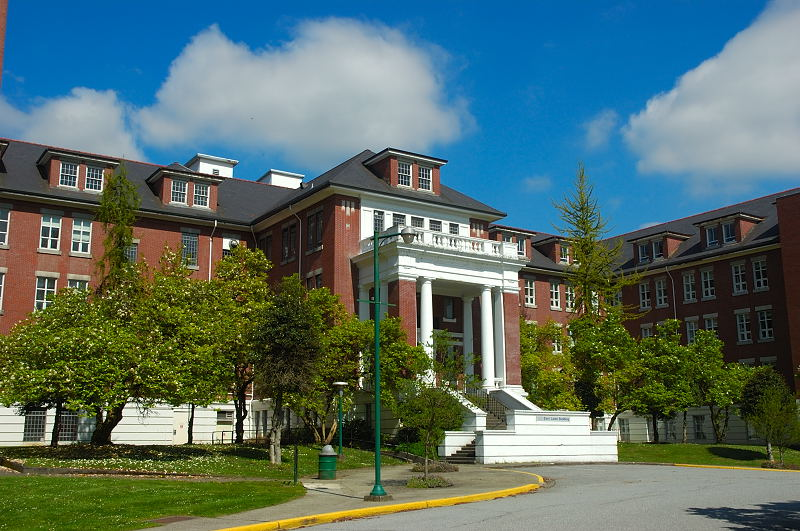
Many of the scenes were filmed at Riverview Hospital.

"Excelsis Dei" was written by Paul Brown, his final script for the series after the earlier episode "Ascension". The episode was directed by Stephen Surjik (his only credit for the series), who had reached out to the show's producers and requested a chance to direct an episode because he was a fan of the show.

Production for this episode was notoriously difficult, and the book The Complete X-Files notes that it "gave the staff headaches—both during the shoot and editing process". Part of this was due to the script being delivered to the cast and crew only two days before filming was scheduled to begin. One part of the episode that was nixed during the writing stage was an extended look at Michelle's love life: originally, she was explicitly described as a lesbian, and in one short scene her partner enters her apartment to talk to her. Series creator Chris Carter eventually cut the scene because he felt it "felt gratuitous at that point".

Many of the scenes were filmed at Riverview Hospital, a psychiatric hospital located in Coquitlam, British Columbia. During on-site production, several of the members of the show's cast and crew claimed that they heard mysterious voices, and they refused to "venture into the bowels of the building" for fear that it was haunted. In order to film the scene featuring the bathroom door bursting with water—a scene Matt Hurwitz and Chris Knowles called "nail-biting"—special effects supervisor Dave Gauthier built a massive tank that was rigged to flood the set hallway with 3,300 gallons of water.

The episode features several actresses that had previously had parts in other episodes of The X-Files. Tasha Simms, who portrayed the daughter of Stan Phillips in the episode, had previously played the part of Cindy Reardon's mother in the first season episode "Eve". Sheila Moore, who had appeared as a background character in the episode "Deep Throat" appears in the episode as the nursing home's director.

== Broadcast and reception ==
"Excelsis Dei" premiered in the United States on the Fox network on December 16, 1994. This episode earned a Nielsen rating of 8.9, with a 15 share, meaning that roughly 8.9 percent of all television-equipped households, and 15 percent of households watching television, were tuned in to the episode. It was viewed by 8.5 million households.

Critical reception to the episode was mostly mixed. Entertainment Weekly gave the episode a grade of B−, calling it "offbeat and cute". Zack Handlen from The A.V. Club was mixed, writing that "the handling of the rape case left a bad taste in my mouth" and that the resolution was "a bit fuzzy". Robert Shearman, in the book Wanting to Believe: A Critical Guide to The X-Files, Millennium & The Lone Gunmen, gave the episode a largely critical review and rated it one star out of five. Shearman referred to the episode as "the idiot's version" of the previous season-two episode "One Breath". Shearman also derided how the episode handled the rape element, noting that "there's a sour atmosphere to the whole proceedings"; he further pointed out that "only Scully shows the slightest concern that a woman's been sexually assaulted." Further, while Shearman found the ghost effects "eerie", he concluded that the scripting was "very stupid".

== Bibliography ==
- Hurwitz, Matt; Knowles, Chris (2008). The Complete X-Files: Behind the Series the Myths and the Movies. New York, US: Insight Editions. ISBN 978-1933784724.
- Lowry, Brian (1995). The Truth is Out There: The Official Guide to the X-Files. Harper Prism. ISBN 0061053309.
- Shearman, Robert (2009). Wanting to Believe: A Critical Guide to The X-Files, Millennium & The Lone Gunmen. Mad Norwegian Press. ISBN 978-0975944691.
