= Firewalker (The X-Files) =

- The X-Files episode
- An ascocarp bursts from throat of Tanaka
- Episode no.: Season 2 Episode 9
- Directed by: David Nutter
- Written by: Howard Gordon
- Production code: 2X09
- Original air date: November 18, 1994
- Running time: 45 minutes

Guest appearances
- Bradley Whitford as Dr. Daniel Trepkos; Hiro Kanagawa as Peter Tanaka; Leland Orser as Jason Ludwig; Shawnee Smith as Jessie O'Neil; Tuck Milligan as Dr. Adam Pierce

Episode chronology
← Previous "One Breath"	Next → "Red Museum"
- The X-Files season 2

"Firewalker" is the ninth episode of the second season of the American science fiction television series The X-Files. It premiered on the Fox network on November 18, 1994. It was written by Howard Gordon, directed by David Nutter, and featured guest appearances by Bradley Whitford, Leland Orser and Shawnee Smith. The episode is a "Monster-of-the-Week" story, unconnected to the series' wider mythology.

The show centers on FBI special agents Fox Mulder (David Duchovny) and Dana Scully (Gillian Anderson) who work on cases linked to the paranormal, called X-Files. In the episode, Mulder and Scully investigate a death in a remote research base and discover that a new silicon-based Ophiocordyceps-like fungus found in the area may be killing the researchers.

The plot of the episode was inspired by NASA's Project Dante. "Firewalker" earned a Nielsen household rating of 9, being watched by 8.6 million households in its initial broadcast. The episode received poor reviews from critics, being noted as repeating material already familiar to the series.

== Plot ==
Dr. Adam Pierce, a scientist at the California Institute of Technology in Pasadena, intercepts a visual transmission from Firewalker, a mobile robot sent by a volcanic research project on Mount Avalon in the Cascades of Washington State. Firewalker is broadcasting from inside a volcanic cave, where Pierce glimpses the dead body of the chief seismologist, Phil Erickson. He also sees a shadow moving in the cave, an impossibility due to the extremely high temperatures. Firewalker's camera is then destroyed, ending the transmission.

Pierce goes to Fox Mulder (David Duchovny) and Dana Scully (Gillian Anderson), showing them a TV interview of the project's leader, Daniel Trepkos (Bradley Whitford); Pierce was with the project until he and Trepkos had a falling-out. Mulder is reluctant to let Scully come along because of her recent abduction; Scully, however, insists that she is ready. Upon arriving at Mount Avalon, Pierce enters the woods to inspect the project's equipment while the agents search the laboratory. They discover the seemingly traumatized team: robotics engineer Jason Ludwig (Leland Orser), systems analyst Peter Tanaka (Hiro Kanagawa), and graduate student Jessie O'Neil (Shawnee Smith). They claim that Trepkos destroyed their lab and disappeared after Firewalker's first descent. Meanwhile, outside, Trepkos strangles Pierce.

After the team retrieves Pierce's body, Mulder reviews Trepkos' fragmented notes. He finds references to a new silicon-based organism existing inside Mount Avalon; Scully, however, doubts his conclusions because of his mental state. Tanaka breaks into convulsions and displays a high fever, but refuses any help from Mulder or Scully. When he is put on a stretcher for a medivac pickup, Mulder notices a throbbing bulge in his neck. Tanaka flees into the woods and dies when a tentacle-like ascocarp bursts out of his throat. An autopsy by Scully finds sand (silicon dioxide) in his lungs, indicating the existence of a silicon-based lifeform; she theorizes that the organism infects the nearest hosts or otherwise dies. Mulder contacts the CDC to have them quarantine the site.

Mulder and Ludwig venture into the volcanic caves to find Trepkos. When they find Firewalker, Trepkos shoots Ludwig in the back with a flare gun, killing him. He then burns Ludwig's body, as he was infected. Trepkos tells Mulder that after Firewalker returned from its first descent, Erickson pulverized a rock in one of its samples, resulting in his death and the infection of all the scientists immediately surrounding him. Trepkos says that the organism is parasitic in nature, making its hosts pass itself on to others. Meanwhile, in the lab, an infected O'Neil handcuffs herself to Scully to expose her to the fungus. Scully protects herself by throwing O'Neil into a sealed chamber and closing the door. The fruiting body breaks out from O'Neil's throat, killing her without spreading the disease any further.

Mulder and Trepkos arrive on the scene. Mulder radios the evacuation team but—knowing that Trepkos will refuse to go—reports that only he and Scully have survived the ordeal. The agents enter a month-long quarantine while the Chemical Corps confiscates the lab and cordons off Mount Avalon. Firewalker is salvaged, but is too damaged to yield sufficient data. Trepkos and O'Neil are officially unaccounted for and presumed dead; Trepkos is last seen carrying O'Neil's body as he disappears into the volcano.

== Production ==
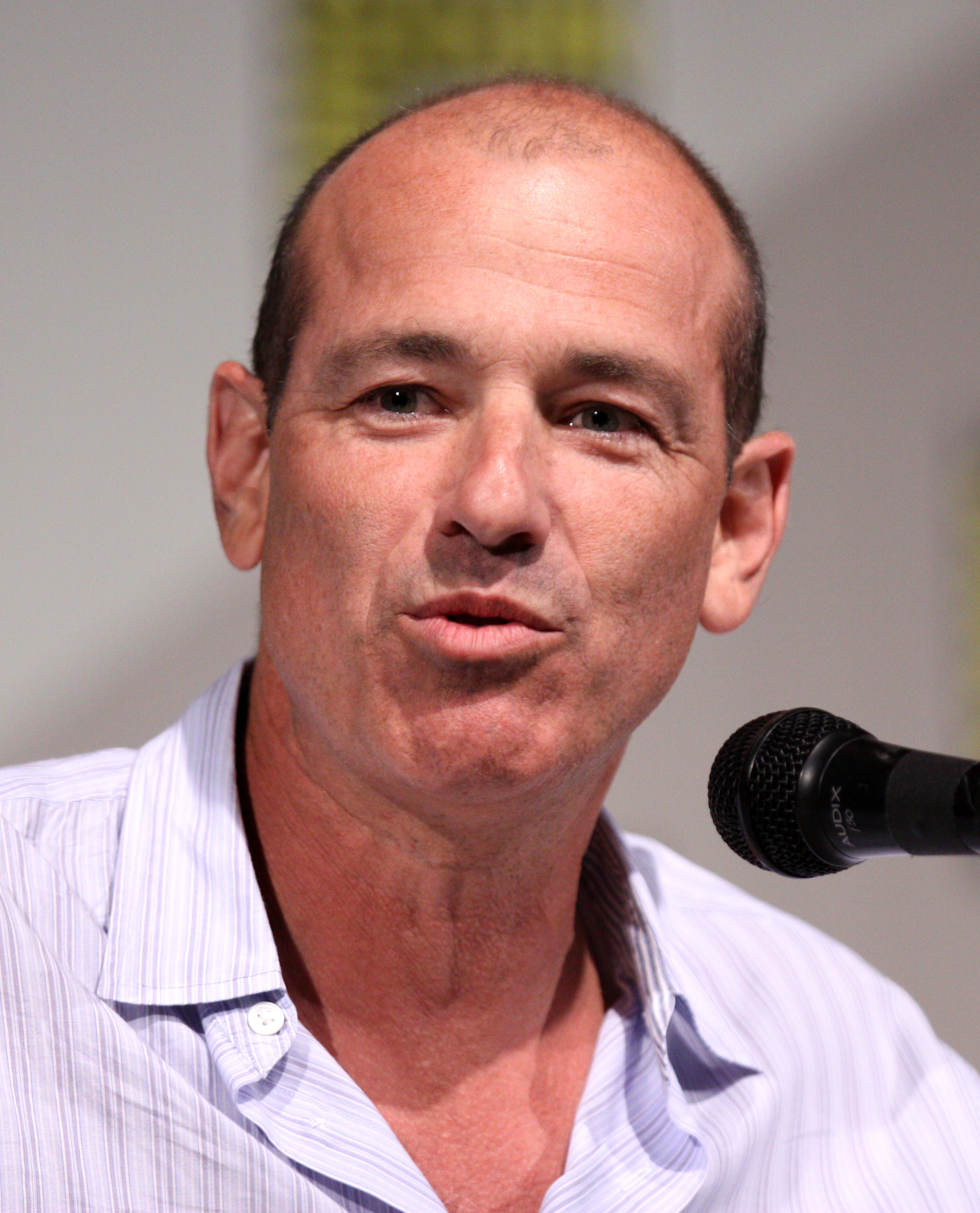
Howard Gordon was inspired to write "Firewalker" by a NASA exploration project.

Howard Gordon was inspired to write the episode after seeing two news reports about Project Dante, a robotic explorer created by NASA that had been sent into a volcano. Chris Carter said of the episode, "I think that's the first time in our second season that we were telling what's one of our serial stories rather than our mythological stories. In other words, it was an X-File rather than one of the cosmology shows that explore the characters". However, Gordon felt that the episode allowed him to explore the possible results of Mulder's search for the truth, echoing this in the mindset of Daniel Trepkos and the interactions between the two characters. Gordon noted that "the natural endpoint of this quest for the truth is madness", comparing Mulder's treatment of Trepkos with the events of the novel Heart of Darkness.

The episode shared themes with previous episodes from the first season such as "Ice" and "Darkness Falls", which both featured the agents finding new lifeforms in remote locations. James Wong was somewhat negative concerning the episode's similarities to "Ice", saying, "If the show starts to cannibalize itself, there's going to be trouble". Gordon stated, however, "I know there are some similarities with 'Ice', but I think once you get beyond the similarities of a group of people in a confined space going up against a creature, there are enough differences to separate the two".

As the mountains of the Cascade Range were too far from Vancouver to serve as a location, the film crew settled on a nearby forest that had a partial view of the mountains. The set used for the exterior of the field base camp was later sold to the production company responsible for the TV series The Sentinel, while the interior was shot inside a British Columbia hydro sub station. A set was built to represent the interior of the volcano, and footage filmed there was achieved through the use of a crane. Hiro Kanagawa, who portrays the character Peter Tanaka, would make two further appearances, in the fourth season episode "Synchrony" and tenth season episode "My Struggle", as well as making appearances both in the spin-off series The Lone Gunmen and The X-Files' sister show Millennium.

== Broadcast and reception ==
"Firewalker" premiered on the Fox network on November 18, 1994. The episode earned a Nielsen household rating of 9 with a 16 share, meaning that roughly 9 percent of all television-equipped households, and 16 percent of households watching television, were tuned in to the episode. A total of 8.6 million households watched this episode during its original airing.

In a retrospective of the second season in Entertainment Weekly, the episode was rated a D−. The review described it as "insultingly bad," noting that it seemed to be "ripping off" both the first-season episode "Ice" and the 1979 film Alien. Writing for The A.V. Club, Zack Handlen felt that "Firewalker" represented a "back to basics" approach to the series, following from the previous story arc relating to Scully's abduction. Handlen noted that the episode would have been "a total waste of time" elsewhere in the season's schedule, but served as a "competent enough" means of reuniting the main characters. Howard Gordon praised physical effects supervisor Toby Lindala's work on this episode, quipping that Lindala's effects "won the gross-out award". Gordon also praised Nutter's job in directing the episode. Carter said that "Firewalker" was a very successful episode. David Nutter added a nice directorial touch; the guest appearances were very good".

== See also ==
- Alien (franchise)
- The Devil in the Dark

== Bibliography ==
- Edwards, Ted (1996). X-Files Confidential. Little, Brown and Company. ISBN 0-316-21808-1.
- Gradnitzer, Louisa; Pittson, Todd (1999). X Marks the Spot: On Location with The X-Files. Arsenal Pulp Press. ISBN 1-55152-066-4.
- Lovece, Frank (1996). The X-Files Declassified. Citadel Press. ISBN 0-8065-1745-X.
- Lowry, Brian (1995). The Truth is Out There: The Official Guide to the X-Files. Harper Prism. ISBN 0-06-105330-9.
