= The X-Files season 2 =

Season of television series

The X-Files
- Season 2
- DVD cover
- Starring: David Duchovny; Gillian Anderson
- No. of episodes: 25

Release
- Original network: Fox
- Original release: September 16, 1994 – May 19, 1995

Season chronology
- ← Previous; Season 1 Next → Season 3

The second season of the science fiction television series The X-Files commenced airing on the Fox network in the United States on September 16, 1994, concluded on the same channel on May 19, 1995, after airing all 25 episodes, making it the only season of the series to consist of 25 episodes. The series follows Federal Bureau of Investigation special agents Fox Mulder and Dana Scully, portrayed by David Duchovny and Gillian Anderson respectively, who investigate paranormal or supernatural cases, known as X-Files by the FBI.

The second season of The X-Files takes place after the closure of the department following the events of the first season finale. In addition to stand-alone "Monster-of-the-Week" episodes, several episodes also furthered the alien conspiracy mythology that had begun to form. Season two introduced several recurring characters—X (Steven Williams), an informant to Mulder; Alex Krycek (Nicholas Lea), Mulder's partner-turned-enemy; and the Alien Bounty Hunter (Brian Thompson), a shape-shifting assassin.

The storylines were widely affected by the pregnancy of actress Gillian Anderson; it was decided that Scully would be kidnapped and abducted by aliens, explaining her absence and allowing her to appear comatose two episodes later, which ultimately added more intricacies to the mythology. The season earned seven Primetime Emmy Award nominations. The premiere "Little Green Men", debuted with a Nielsen household rating of 10.3 and was viewed by 9.8 million households, marking a noticeable increase in viewership since the previous year. The series rose from number 111 to number 63 for the 1994–95 television year. In addition, the show's second season has generally received positive reviews from television critics.

== Plot overview ==
Dana Scully (Gillian Anderson) is reassigned to teach at the FBI Academy while Fox Mulder (David Duchovny) is given lowly surveillance assignments. After he investigates extraterrestrial cases at the Arecibo Observatory in Puerto Rico, Mulder is given a new partner, Alex Krycek (Nicholas Lea), and meets a secretive informant, X (Steven Williams). Mulder is recruited to assist in a hostage negotiation when Duane Barry, an alien abductee, captures four people. Barry eventually kidnaps Scully, believing that if he brings her to his original abduction site, Skyland Mountain, aliens will take her instead of him. Mulder follows but is delayed by Krycek, who is revealed to be a mole working for Cigarette Smoking Man (William B. Davis). When Mulder reaches Skyland Mountain, Scully is gone. Barry, who insists that aliens took him, dies soon after an interrogation by Krycek. When Krycek vanishes, Skinner re-opens the X-Files, claiming that is what the conspirators will fear most.

Scully turns up comatose in a hospital four weeks later with no explanation about how she got there. X provides Mulder with information allowing him to take revenge on her captors, but Mulder is instead convinced by Scully's sister Melissa to visit her bedside. Scully recovers and returns to work shortly thereafter. The agents later investigate a case involving alien biology being injected into teenagers in Wisconsin, and once again they encounter Deep Throat's killer, who is killed by the local sheriff.

When investigating a case involving the murder of identical doctors, the agents come across a shapeshifting Alien Bounty Hunter (Brian Thompson) responsible for executing a series of alien clones. During this case a grown woman claiming to be Mulder's sister Samantha appears, telling Mulder of the Bounty Hunter's objectives and that she has the ability to identify him. When Scully is kidnapped by the Bounty Hunter, Mulder is forced to trade Samantha for her. During a botched attempt to kill the Bounty Hunter, Samantha is killed. However, it is discovered that this was simply one of many alien clones of Samantha. With the help of X, Mulder pursues the Bounty Hunter to a submarine in the Arctic. Mulder is nearly killed when exposed to the Bounty Hunter's toxic blood, but is saved by Scully.

When a hacker downloads decades' worth of classified information about aliens onto a digital tape, he gives it to Mulder, who finds that the entire tape is written in Navajo. Cigarette Smoking Man begins searching for the tape and visits Mulder's father, who calls Mulder to see him shortly afterwards. Before he can reveal anything to Mulder, however, he is murdered by Alex Krycek. Scully brings Mulder to New Mexico, where she introduces him to Albert Hosteen, a code-talker who can translate the digital tape. Albert's grandson shows Mulder a boxcar filled with alien corpses. Cigarette Smoking Man tracks Mulder's location, however, and orders the boxcar burned.

== Production ==
=== Writing and development ===
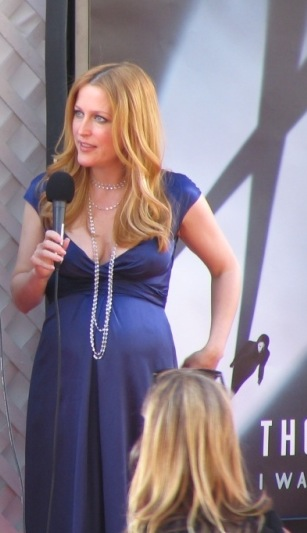
Gillian Anderson's pregnancy altered the storyline for the season. Pictured: Anderson pregnant with her third child, Felix, 2008

The season premiere was originally supposed to have been written by series creator Chris Carter. In his initial pitch, Mulder would have been sent to Moscow. In fact, the producers wanted to film the episode in Russia, but they were not able to secure the appropriate arrangements. In the end, Carter was unable to complete the script idea, which would have also featured the reopening of the X-Files. Instead, co-executive producers Glen Morgan, James Wong and Howard Gordon penned the opening premiere, "Little Green Men"; the episode was the first entry to actually show an alien in the series. This delay gave Carter time to write "Duane Barry", the start of the series' first two-parter.

As the series ended its first season, a problem had arisen for the producers: the pregnancy of Gillian Anderson, who played Dana Scully. Some network executives wanted the role recast, which Carter refused to do. Though they considered having Scully giving birth to an alien child, the producers decided to work around Anderson's pregnancy by having her abducted and appearing comatose several episodes later. This was described by executive producer Frank Spotnitz as "the best thing that ever happened to the series" as it helped form the intricate mythology that would run throughout the show.

The writers decided to close the X-Files at the end of the first season and thus separate Mulder and Scully in the earlier episodes of the season. To hide Anderson's pregnancy in the early episodes, the producers disguised it with "very fancy trick angles, trench coats, and scenes where she is seated rather than standing". The two-parter of Carter's "Duane Barry" and Paul Brown's "Ascension" were scripted to culminate in Scully's abduction and the re-opening of the X-Files. Anderson does not feature at all in the following episode "3", as she was giving birth to her daughter at the time of filming.

=== Casting ===
The season introduced the character X, played by Steven Williams, who replaced Deep Throat as Mulder's informant, following Deep Throat's assassination in the first-season finale, "The Erlenmeyer Flask". X was originally intended to be a woman with Natalija Nogulich already cast in the role, but was replaced by Williams as the writers did not believe she had the "right chemistry" with her co-stars. X was written to be different than Deep Throat. Deep Throat had been selfless, while X was intended to be selfish and scared. Nicholas Lea, who had previously appeared in a small part in the season one's "Gender Bender", was cast as Alex Krycek. Krycek was originally intended as a temporary replacement for Scully when she was abducted, but grew into a character who would last seven seasons on the show.

During the production of the season, Duchovny asked Carter "wouldn't it be great if we had like an alien bounty hunter?" Carter was positive towards the idea and acted upon it, creating with Spotnitz the character of the Alien Bounty Hunter for the two-part episodes "Colony" and "End Game". Actor Brian Thompson auditioned for the role in a casting session, where he was competing with another actor. Spotnitz and Carter did not have much time to cast the character, but they knew this casting would be important since they intended the character to become a recurring character. Thompson was chosen according to Spotnitz because he had a very "distinctive look" about him, most notably his face and mouth.

Megan Leitch appeared in "Colony" and "End Game" as a grown-up clone version of Samantha Mulder, and returned to play Samantha or one of her clones over the other seasons. Carter did not want it to be the real Samantha, since that would have been "straight science fiction" and it was too "ridiculous" to give too many answers. Darren McGavin, star of Kolchak: The Night Stalker, was sought out for the part of Senator Matheson in "Little Green Men" and Mulder's father in "Colony" and "End Game", but the roles went to Raymond J. Barry and Peter Donat respectively, while McGavin agreed to play X-Files founder Arthur Dales in season five.

=== Crew ===
Carter also served as executive producer and showrunner and wrote seven episodes. Co-executive producers and writing team Glen Morgan and James Wong wrote five episodes for their final season as regular writers for the series, although they both returned as consulting producers for part of season four. Supervising producer Howard Gordon wrote five episodes. Frank Spotnitz joined the series, writing two episodes. Cast member David Duchovny collaborated with Carter for two episodes, receiving story credit. Glen Morgan's younger brother Darin Morgan joined the series, contributing the story for an episode written by his older brother and James Wong, and writing another script solo.

Paul Brown joined the series as a producer and wrote two episodes. Sara B. Charno, another staff writer, wrote two episodes. Vince Gilligan joined the series, writing one episode. Former supervising producer Alex Gansa returned to co-wrote one episode with writing partner Howard Gordon. Chris Ruppenthal returned to write one more freelance episode after last season. Steve De Jarnatt contributed one freelance episode for the season. Line producer and production manager Joseph Patrick Finn was promoted to producer with this season. Paul Rabwin continued to serve as co-producer for the show.

Producing-directors for the show included Rob Bowman, David Nutter, Kim Manners and co-executive producer R. W. Goodwin, who directed most of the season; Bowman with seven, Nutter with five, and Manners and Goodwin each with two. Series creator Chris Carter directed one episode, making his directorial debut, while Daniel Sackheim, Michael Lange, James Contner, James Whitmore, Jr., Michael Vejar, Nick Marck, Stephen Surjik and Win Phelps each directed one episode.

== Cast ==
=== Main cast ===
- David Duchovny as Special Agent Fox Mulder
- Gillian Anderson as Special Agent Dana Scully (Note: Anderson does not appear in "3".)

=== Recurring cast ===
- Mitch Pileggi as Walter Skinner
- Steven Williams as X
- William B. Davis as Cigarette Smoking Man
- Nicholas Lea as Alex Krycek
- Tom Braidwood as Melvin Frohike
- Bruce Harwood as John Fitzgerald Byers
- Dean Haglund as Richard Langly
- Peter Donat as William Mulder

=== Guest cast ===
- Sheila Larken as Margaret Scully
- Megan Leitch as Samantha Mulder
- Steve Railsback as Duane Barry
- Brian Thompson as Alien Bounty Hunter
- Raymond J. Barry as Richard Matheson
- Nick Chinlund as Donnie Pfaster
- Don S. Davis as William Scully
- Lindsey Ginter as Crew Cut Man
- Melinda McGraw as Melissa Scully
- Rebecca Toolan as Teena Mulder
- Floyd Westerman as Albert Hosteen

== Episodes ==
Episodes marked with a double dagger (‡) are episodes in the series' Alien Mythology arc. (Note: The episodes were included in the DVD collection The X-Files Mythology, Volume 1 – Abduction, released by Fox.)

No. overall	No. in season	Title	Directed by	Written by	Original release date	Prod. code	U.S. viewers (millions)
25	1	"Little Green Men"‡	David Nutter	Glen Morgan & James Wong	September 16, 1994	2X01	16.1
With the X-Files shut down, FBI agent Fox Mulder finds his own belief in the truth waning. So when an old political ally gives him a new reason to believe, he goes alone to an abandoned SETI program site—Arecibo Observatory—in Arecibo, Puerto Rico. Concerned for his safety, fellow FBI agent Dana Scully has to track down his whereabouts before someone or something else does.
26	2	"The Host"	Daniel Sackheim	Chris Carter	September 23, 1994	2X02	15.9
When a man's decomposed body is found in the sewers of Newark, Mulder is given the supposed "grunt" work. But after Scully's autopsy turns up a parasite living inside the body and a sewer worker is attacked and bitten by something, it opens up a whole new can of worms.
27	3	"Blood"	David Nutter	Story by : Darin Morgan; Teleplay by : Glen Morgan & James Wong	September 30, 1994	2X03	14.8
Prompted by messages from digital appliances with instructions to kill, several residents of a small farming community suddenly turn violent and dangerous.
28	4	"Sleepless"	Rob Bowman	Howard Gordon	October 7, 1994	2X04	13.4
An audio cassette hidden in his morning paper brings Mulder to request the case of a scientist's death consistent with burning, despite the lack of any evidence of any flames or burns. He is given his request along with a new partner, Agent Alex Krycek.
29	5	"Duane Barry"‡	Chris Carter	Chris Carter	October 14, 1994	2X05	13.9
Ex-FBI agent Duane Barry escapes from a mental hospital and holds several people hostage in a travel agency. Mulder and Krycek are sent in to help with the negotiations since the man claims to have been a UFO abductee.
30	6	"Ascension"‡	Michael Lange	Paul Brown	October 21, 1994	2X06	15.5
Continuing from the previous episode, Mulder races to Scully's house after listening to the recording of her attack on his answering machine. Duane Barry has kidnapped Scully, determined to offer her to the aliens in his place. Mulder goes to great lengths to attempt to locate Scully.
31	7	"3"	David Nutter	Chris Ruppenthal and Glen Morgan & James Wong	November 4, 1994	2X07	15.0
Walter Skinner reopens the X-Files, but Mulder is finding it difficult to work without the missing Scully. When he recognizes a Los Angeles killing as the work of the Trinity murderers, a trio of killers with a fetish for drinking blood, it gives him work in which to immerse himself.
32	8	"One Breath"‡	R. W. Goodwin	Glen Morgan & James Wong	November 11, 1994	2X08	15.3
When Scully mysteriously re-appears comatose in a hospital, Mulder fixates himself on finding the people responsible, though his quest for vengeance could make him exactly like those he despises.
33	9	"Firewalker"	David Nutter	Howard Gordon	November 18, 1994	2X09	15.2
A malfunction in a robot designed for volcanic exploration yields evidence of a lifeform living in the caves. When this lifeform seemingly causes the death of a member of the research team, Mulder and a newly recovered Scully are flown out to the site in The Cascades to investigate before anyone else dies.
34	10	"Red Museum"‡	Win Phelps	Chris Carter	December 9, 1994	2X10	16.1
Several Wisconsin teens are found wandering in the woods in their underwear with "He Is One" scrawled on their backs. Mulder and Scully travel to investigate this aberrant behavior, though the strangest thing in this meat-producing area is a mysterious cult of vegetarian "walk-ins." The Crew Cut Man returns, this time working alone. Several relics from the mythology like purity control and Deep Throat are revisited here.
35	11	"Excelsis Dei"	Stephen Surjik	Paul Brown	December 16, 1994	2X11	14.2
Mulder and Scully's latest case begins with the rape and battery of a nurse in a Massachusetts nursing home—what makes it an X-File is that her attacker was invisible but blames a 74 year old patient. However, upon their arrival, they uncover strange secrets about the home and its residents.
36	12	"Aubrey"	Rob Bowman	Sara B. Charno	January 6, 1995	2X12	16.2
When a detective mysteriously uncovers the remains of an FBI agent who disappeared in the 1940s while investigating a homicide case eerily similar to a modern-day one she is investigating, Mulder and Scully believe that the original 1940s killer passed his genetic trait of violence to his grandchild.
37	13	"Irresistible"	David Nutter	Chris Carter	January 13, 1995	2X13	14.7
Someone is excavating graves in Minneapolis, removing body parts from the corpses. Mulder and Scully are contacted because the agent on the case believes it is the work of aliens; however Mulder quickly dismisses the idea, profiling the perpetrator as a fetishist. Later key evidence shows up and Scully realizes the case is more personal than she thought.
38	14	"Die Hand Die Verletzt"	Kim Manners	Glen Morgan & James Wong	January 27, 1995	2X14	17.7
New Hampshire teenagers feign an occult ritual in an attempt to "score" and inadvertently cause the murder and mutilation of one of their group. When Mulder and Scully are called to look into the matter, the town's real worshippers attempt to hide their tracks, though it seems there is a mysterious force at work that even the worshippers are afraid of.
39	15	"Fresh Bones"	Rob Bowman	Howard Gordon	February 3, 1995	2X15	17.8
One morning, after two gruesome hallucinations, Private Jack McAlpin crashes his car into a tree that has a voodoo symbol drawn on it; the second death of a marine in two weeks that has featured that symbol. The marines in question were guarding a processing center for Haitian refugees, and when Mulder and Scully visit the center they find the deaths were not as unexpected as they seemed.
40	16	"Colony"‡	Nick Marck	Story by : David Duchovny & Chris Carter; Teleplay by : Chris Carter	February 10, 1995	2X16	15.9
At the beginning, a frozen Mulder is brought to a hospital. The episode flashes back to a scene two weeks before, where the crew of a research vessel find the wreckage of a UFO in the Beaufort Sea. The pilot who survives this crash walks out of the hospital and kills identical-looking doctors in various abortion clinics.
41	17	"End Game"‡	Rob Bowman	Frank Spotnitz	February 17, 1995	2X17	17.5
An alien bounty hunter kidnaps Scully and wants to trade her for Mulder's sister, Samantha Mulder. Mulder asks for Skinner's help in making the trade, and has the FBI Director set up a sniper to take down the bounty hunter.
42	18	"Fearful Symmetry"	James Whitmore, Jr.	Steve De Jarnatt	February 24, 1995	2X18	16.5
The death of a federal construction worker and the destruction of various property can only be tied to an escaped elephant, yet the witnesses claim to have seen no animals which might have caused the turmoil. Soon, Mulder and Scully discover the local zoo whose claim to fame is that they've never had a successful animal birth.
43	19	"Død Kalm"	Rob Bowman	Story by : Howard Gordon; Teleplay by : Howard Gordon & Alex Gansa	March 10, 1995	2X19	17.1
Mulder and Scully are called in when a boatload of survivors from a U.S. Navy destroyer escort are found. What particularly catches Agent Mulder's attention is that all of these Sailors appear to have aged many decades in the course of a few days. Mulder and Scully travel to Norway where they find a civilian fisherman who is willing to take them to the ship's last known position.
44	20	"Humbug"	Kim Manners	Darin Morgan	March 31, 1995	2X20	15.7
Mulder and Scully must find the paranormal among the abnormal when they are sent to investigate a long standing series of ritualistic killings which match no known patterns. The latest of which was the death of the "Alligator Man", just one of many sideshow acts around which the town of Gibsonton, Florida, is built.
45	21	"The Calusari"	Michael Vejar	Sara B. Charno	April 14, 1995	2X21	12.9
A photograph taken just before the death of a two-year-old boy yields evidence of some supernatural intervention which piques Mulder's curiosity. When another death in the family occurs, the grandmother of the remaining child requests the aid of some Romanian ritualists (called "călușari" or "horsemen") in order to cleanse the home of evil.
46	22	"F. Emasculata"	Rob Bowman	Chris Carter & Howard Gordon	April 28, 1995	2X22	14.0
After several men in a prison die of a mysterious illness, Scully tries to discover the cause while Mulder attempts to find two escapees who could potentially spread the disease.
47	23	"Soft Light"	James Contner	Vince Gilligan	May 5, 1995	2X23	12.9
An ex-student of Scully's asks the agents to help her with her first investigation concerning a number of disappearances with very few clues. Mulder ponders the idea of spontaneous human combustion but rethinks it when they find a man who is afraid of his own shadow. The man is Dr. Banton, a scientist researching dark matter.
48	24	"Our Town"	Rob Bowman	Frank Spotnitz	May 12, 1995	2X24	14.5
Dudley, Arkansas, is the site of the latest investigation for Mulder and Scully, who are sent to find a missing poultry inspector. The case takes a twist when another poultry worker is shot after she goes insane, giving Mulder a hunch that the townsfolk really are what they eat.
49	25	"Anasazi"‡	R. W. Goodwin	Story by : David Duchovny & Chris Carter; Teleplay by : Chris Carter	May 19, 1995	2X25	16.6
The trust that Mulder and Scully have is sorely tested when Mulder begins acting strangely. His aberrant behavior is compounded when the Lone Gunmen direct him to a hacker who managed to break into some very closely guarded files. The files are encrypted in Navajo and need to be decoded by a former Navajo code talker.

== Reception ==
=== Ratings ===
The second season of The X-Files debuted with "Little Green Men" on September 16, 1994. The episode earned a Nielsen household rating of 10.3, with a 19 share, meaning that roughly 10.3 percent of all television-equipped households, and 19 percent of households watching television, were tuned in to the episode. The episode was viewed by 9.8 million households, an increase from the first season's finale, "The Erlenmeyer Flask", which was viewed by 8.3 million households. "Little Green Men" was, at the time, the highest-rated episode of The X-Files to air. As the season continued, ratings began to grow. The season hit a high with the fifteenth episode, "Fresh Bones", which was viewed by 10.8 million households.

The season hit a low with the twenty-first episode, "The Calusari", which was viewed by 7.9 million households and received a rating of 8.3/16. The season finale, "Anasazi", earned a Nielsen rating of 10.1, with an 18 share, and was viewed by 9.6 million households, marking a 13.5 percent increase in households when compared to the previous season finale. (Note: "The Erlenmeyer Flask" was viewed by 8.3 million households whereas "Anasazi" was viewed by 9.6. Subtracting the two figures and then dividing them by 9.6 million, which represents the largest possible audience, yields a percent increase of 13.5 percent.) The series was ranked as number 63 during the 1994–95 television season, a significant increase in ratings when compared to the first season, which finished at number 111.

=== Reviews ===
The DVD Journal gave the season four out of four stars, calling it a "memorable season". The review highlighted "The Host", "Duane Barry" and "Ascension", the cliffhanger finale "Anasazi", the "unforgettable" "Humbug", and meeting Mulder and Scully's families in "Colony" and "One Breath". IGN gave the season a rating of 9 out of 10, with the reviewer noting it was an improvement upon the first as it had "started to explore a little" and the "evolution of the characters makes the product shine even though the plotlines have begun to seem familiar". Robert Shearman and Lars Pearson, in their book Wanting to Believe: A Critical Guide to The X-Files, Millennium & The Lone Gunmen, rated several episodes across the season highly, awarding five stars out of five to "Little Green Men", "Duane Barry", "One Breath", "Irresistible", "Die Hand Die Verletzt", and "Anasazi". Several episodes rated poorly, with "3", "Excelsis Dei", and "The Calusari" being considered particularly poor.

Many critics considered the "Duane Barry"/"Ascension"/"One Breath" story arc to be the best part of the season. Shearman singled out the three-parter as the highlight of the season, noting that the "intimacy" and "sincerity [of] the emotion" of the episodes allowed the mythology of The X-Files to play out for a further seven seasons. Tom Kessenich, in his book Examination: An Unauthorized Look at Seasons 6–9 of the X-Files named the story arc the top episode of The X-Files and wrote, "to this day, this remains the defining moment in the series run. So much sprang forth from this trio of episodes. ... Sensational."

=== Accolades ===
The second season earned the series seven Primetime Emmy Award nominations, including its first for Outstanding Drama Series. The episode "Duane Barry" received four nominations for different categories; CCH Pounder for Outstanding Guest Actress in a Drama Series; Chris Carter for Outstanding Individual Achievement in Writing for a Drama Series; James Coblentz for Outstanding Individual Achievement in Editing for a Series – Single Camera Production; and for Outstanding Individual Achievement in Sound Editing for a Series. Other nominations included John S. Bartley for Outstanding Individual Achievement in Cinematography for a Series for "One Breath", and Stephen Mark for Outstanding Individual Achievement in Editing for a Series – Single Camera Production for "Sleepless". This season earned the series its first of three wins for the Golden Globe Award for Best Television Series – Drama.

== DVD release ==
The X-Files – The Complete Second Season
Set details		Special features
25 episodes; 7-disc set; 1.33:1 aspect ratio; Subtitles: English, Spanish; English (Dolby 2.0 Surround)		"The Truth About Season Two" documentary; Chris Carter talks about 12 episodes: "Little Green Men", "The Host", "Sleepless", "Duane Barry", "Ascension", "One Breath", "Irresistible", "Die Hand Die Verletzt", "Colony", "End Game", "Humbug", and "Anasazi"; Selected special effects clips; Deleted scenes; 9 "Behind-the-truth" spots from F/X; 49 promotional television spots
Release dates
Region 1	Region 2	Region 4
November 28, 2000	April 30, 2001	April 20, 2001

== Bibliography ==
- Hurwitz, Matt; Knowles, Chris (2008). The Complete X-Files. Insight Editions. ISBN 978-1-933784-80-9.
- Kessenich, Tom (2002). Examination. New York, US: Trafford Publishing. ISBN 1-55369-812-6.
- Lovece, Frank (1996). The X-Files Declassified. Citadel Press. ISBN 0-8065-1745-X.
- Lowry, Brian (1995). The Truth is Out There: The Official Guide to the X-Files. Harper Prism. ISBN 0-06-105330-9.
- Shearman, Robert; Pearson, Lars (2009). Wanting to Believe: A Critical Guide to The X-Files, Millennium & The Lone Gunmen. Mad Norwegian Press. ISBN 978-0-9759446-9-1.
