= Irresistible (The X-Files) =

- The X-Files episode
- Donnie Pfaster seen as a demon
- Episode no.: Season 2 Episode 13
- Directed by: David Nutter
- Written by: Chris Carter
- Production code: 2X13
- Original air date: January 13, 1995
- Running time: 45 minutes

Guest appearances
- Bruce Weitz as Agent Moe Bocks; Nick Chinlund as Donnie Pfaster; Christine Willes as Agent Karen Kosseff

Episode chronology
← Previous "Aubrey"	Next → "Die Hand Die Verletzt"
- The X-Files season 2

"Irresistible" is the thirteenth episode of the second season of the American science fiction television series The X-Files. It premiered on the Fox network on January 13, 1995. The episode was written by series creator Chris Carter, directed by David Nutter, and featured the first of two guest appearances by Nick Chinlund as the death fetishist killer Donnie Pfaster. The episode is a "Monster-of-the-Week" story, a stand-alone plot which is unconnected to the series' wider mythology. The episode was viewed by 8.8 million people upon its first broadcast, and received positive reviews, with much praise to Chinlund's performance as the antagonist.

The show centers on FBI special agents Fox Mulder (David Duchovny) and Dana Scully (Gillian Anderson) who work on cases linked to the paranormal, called X-Files. In the episode, Mulder and Scully investigate a death fetishist who begins kidnapping and killing women to satisfy his obsession. Scully, still recovering from her earlier abduction, is soon overcome with posttraumatic stress disorder.

"Irresistible" is one of the few in the series that was intended to have no paranormal elements to it. Initially, the script called for Donnie Pfaster to be a necrophiliac, but the idea was soon rejected by the Fox Broadcasting Company for being "unacceptable for broadcast standards". Pfaster was eventually brought back in the season seven episode "Orison", where his brief appearances in the guise of a demon were further explored.

== Plot ==
In St. Paul, Minnesota, a funeral is held for a young girl. The ceremony is observed by Donnie Pfaster, the eerie assistant director for the funeral home. Later that night, Pfaster's boss catches him cutting off the corpse's hair and promptly fires him.

Fox Mulder and Dana Scully are summoned to Minneapolis by Moe Bocks, an FBI field agent who is investigating the exhumation and desecration of a body in a local cemetery. Mulder discounts Bocks' theory that this act is a variation of extraterrestrial cattle mutilation, and suggests they search for a human culprit. Scully is disturbed at the sight of the disheveled corpse. Two more bodies are found exhumed, with their hair cut and fingernails removed. Mulder develops a psychological profile of the criminal, believing him to be an escalating "death fetishist" who may resort to murder to satisfy his desires. Scully keeps her discomfort with the case to herself, and writes up a field report on necrophilia.

Pfaster, who is behind the exhumations, proves Mulder's prediction correct when he brings a prostitute to his apartment. When the prostitute discovers a collection of funerary wreaths in Pfaster's bedroom, he kills her and removes her fingers. Later, Pfaster—having been hired as a frozen food delivery man—delivers to the low-security house of a woman with teenaged daughters. In the bathroom, he steals some discarded hair from a brush found in the trashcan. Pfaster attends a night class at a community college, where a female classmate defends herself after he makes threatening advances. He is arrested and is placed in a jail cell across from a suspect being interrogated for Pfaster's crimes by Mulder, Scully and Bocks. Pfaster shows interest in Scully, and learns her name from the interrogated suspect. Pfaster is released as his charges are dropped.

Scully is deeply troubled by Pfaster's crimes, and has unsettling dreams and hallucinations about the case. In Washington, she has a counseling session with a social worker, during which she shares her anxiety about the investigation. After the session, Scully learns that someone from Minnesota had called for her. When she contacts Mulder, she learns that neither he nor Bocks made the call. Tracing a fingerprint to Pfaster from his arrest, Mulder and Bocks raid his apartment, finding one of the prostitute's fingers in his refrigerator. After Scully arrives in Minneapolis, Pfaster forces her car off the road. He kidnaps Scully and takes her to his late mother's abandoned house. He ties and gags Scully, and keeps her in a dark closet.

Mulder and Bocks discover that Pfaster's mother had owned a car which matches paint found on Scully's abandoned vehicle, and track down her former residence. Meanwhile, Scully escapes from Pfaster as he prepares a cold bath for her, resulting in a pursuit through the house. Scully and Pfaster have a struggle that sends them falling down a staircase into the foyer, where a task force led by Mulder and Bocks breaks in moments later and apprehends Pfaster. Scully initially insists that she is okay, but then breaks down and cries in Mulder's arms. In a voice-over narration, Mulder traces Pfaster's pathology to his childhood, when he was raised in a family of four older sisters. Mulder also reflects on Pfaster's nature and the nature of evil in general.

== Production ==
The episode's initial script where Pfaster was a necrophiliac was rejected by the Fox Broadcasting Company for being "unacceptable for broadcast standards". As series creator Chris Carter described it, "When I handed the script in, it was really for a necrophiliac episode, and that just didn't fly. You cannot do the combination of sex and death on network television." Carter was forced to tone down the script by changing Pfaster from a necrophiliac to a death fetishist and diminishing Pfaster's sexual obsession. He considered that the sexual content was "implied and understood by audiences", and that Pfaster still resulted in a creepy character, particularly his "creepy arrogance" in using shampoo on the hair of his victims. The episode's original title was "Fascination".

The episode is one of the few in the series that has no overt paranormal elements to it. Carter said of the episode's conception, "My first chance to work with David Nutter in a long time, and I wanted to give him something he could sink his teeth into. It's a little bit different for us. It doesn't really have a paranormal aspect, except for Scully's perceptions of her deepest fears. I felt that I had to figure out what she is most afraid of, and she is most afraid of those things that most of us are afraid of. The idea of dying at the hands of someone—creature or not—and she is helpless to do anything about it. I thought it was a very good way to explore Scully's character." The scene where Dana Scully sees Pfaster morph into a devil was influenced by real-life accounts, as described by Carter: "There are reports of people who had been under the spell of Jeffrey Dahmer, who actually claimed that he shape-shifted during those hours when they were held hostage; that his image actually changed." Nutter said "In many ways, Chris wanted to sell the idea that, as established in Mulder's closing dialogue in the show, not all terror comes from the paranormal. It could come from the person next door."

Carter said of the casting of Nick Chinlund as Pfaster, "I thought it was a wonderfully creepy villain. The casting of that show was very difficult. We saw many actors, but there was a quality I was looking for and I couldn't put a name on that quality. I finally figured out what it was when Nick came in and he had a kind of androgynous quality that worked. I thought he looked like Joe College, but he could scare the hell out of you." Producer Glen Morgan said Chinlund's performance was outstanding. Nutter stated "Nick Chinlund was wonderful to work with. The guy was like putty in my hands. He was great. If you're looking for someone to underline the weirdness and strangeness of the character, he did that."

Nutter said of the episode "I really worked hard to make it a special show, because I thought it was special. It was Gillian's post-traumatic stress episode, because she had not really had the opportunity to vent her feelings about the whole Duane Barry situation. This was an opportunity to sit back and let all that happen." Carter particularly liked the scene where a clearly disturbed Scully hugs Mulder, claiming it was a "tender moment" between two characters that had not shown that much affection for each other.

== Reception ==
=== Ratings ===
"Irresistible" premiered on the Fox network on January 13, 1995. This episode earned a Nielsen rating of 9.2, with a 15 share, meaning that roughly 9.2 percent of all television-equipped households, and 15 percent of households watching television, were tuned in to the episode. It was viewed by 8.8 million households.

=== Reviews ===
"Irresistible" received largely positive reviews from critics. Entertainment Weekly rated "Irresistible" a B+, saying it was based on "an unsettling concept to begin with" that was reinforced by "Chinlund's skin-crawling one-man show". Emily St. James of The A.V. Club rated the episode A, praising the acting, particularly of Chinlund as Pfaster, and describing it as "legitimately scary, a sign of a show that was pushing itself in new and interesting directions". The only criticism was for the scenes where Scully hallucinates Pfaster shapeshifting as "pretty silly, almost feeling like an attempt to make sure something vaguely paranormal is in the episode so the fans don't get bored with what is ultimately a very good episode". Jessica Morgan of Television Without Pity gave the episode a B+ grade. Writing for Den of Geek, Nina Sordi ranked "Irresistible" the sixth best X-Files episode, saying that "excluding CSM and his cronies, Pfaster has got to be the most disturbing villain that our favorite agents have encountered". Den of Geek writer Juliette Harrisson named it the "finest" stand-alone episode of the second season, describing it as "a genuinely creepy 45-minute horror movie". Connie Ogle of Popmatters listed Pfaster among the best monster-of-the-week characters of the series, and IGN's Christine Seghers ranked Chinlund the seventh best guest star in the history of the show, considering that "what makes him all the more frightening is how downright passive and polite he is up until the moment he's going to kill; the perfect camouflage for a modern-day monster." TV Guide listed Pfaster among the scariest X-Files monsters describing him as "evil incarnate".

Chris Carter said "Irresistible" was effective for "being really scary", and that not only it was one of his favorites, but inspired him to create the television series Millennium later.

== Bibliography ==
- Edwards, Ted (1996). X-Files Confidential. Little, Brown and Company. ISBN 0-316-21808-1.
- Hurwitz, Matt; Knowles, Chris (2008). The Complete X-Files. Insight Editions. ISBN 978-1-933784-80-9.
- Lovece, Frank (1996). The X-Files Declassified. Citadel Press. ISBN 0-8065-1745-X.
- Lowry, Brian (1995). The Truth is Out There: The Official Guide to the X-Files. Harper Prism. ISBN 0-06-105330-9.
- Shapiro, Marc (2000). All Things: The Official Guide to the X-Files Volume 6. Harper Prism. ISBN 0-06-107611-2.
