= Orison (The X-Files) =

- The X-Files episode
- Episode no.: Season 7 Episode 7
- Directed by: Rob Bowman
- Written by: Chip Johannessen
- Production code: 7ABX07
- Original air date: January 9, 2000
- Running time: 44 minutes

Guest appearances
- Nick Chinlund as Donnie Pfaster; Scott Wilson as Reverend Orison; Steve Rankin as U.S. Marshal Joseph Daddo; Irene Muzzy as Waitress; Tara Buck as Runaway; Lisa Arch as Lady in Red; Rick Cramer as Guard; Emilio Rivera as Brigham; Eric Buker as U.S. Marshal

Episode chronology
← Previous "The Goldberg Variation"	Next → "The Amazing Maleeni"
- The X-Files season 7

"Orison" is the seventh episode of the seventh season of the science fiction television series The X-Files. It premiered on the Fox network in the United States on January 9, 2000. It was written by Chip Johannessen, directed by Rob Bowman, and featured guest appearances by Nick Chinlund and Scott Wilson. The episode is a "Monster-of-the-Week" story, unconnected to the series' wider mythology. In addition, "Orison" serves as a sequel, and brings closure, to the second season episode "Irresistible", with Chinlund reprising his role as Donnie Pfaster. "Orison" earned a Nielsen household rating of 9.4, being watched by 15.63 million people in its initial broadcast. The episode received mixed reviews from critics, with some criticizing the final scene featuring Scully killing Pfaster, calling it a betrayal of characterization.

The show centers on FBI special agents Fox Mulder (David Duchovny) and Dana Scully (Gillian Anderson) who work on cases linked to the paranormal, called X-Files. Mulder is a believer in the paranormal, while the skeptical Scully has been assigned to debunk his work. In this episode, Reverend Orison releases Donnie Pfaster, Scully's former kidnapper, from jail in the hopes of passing judgment on him. What he discovers instead is that he has released pure evil, and it’s headed for Scully.

"Orison" was written by Johannessen, who had formerly been an executive producer on the television series Millennium. Johannessen's first draft featured an escaped prisoner who could stop time. Executive producers Chris Carter, Frank Spotnitz, and John Shiban enjoyed the premise and decided to bring back Donnie Pfaster.

== Plot ==
At a prison in Marion, Illinois, an inmate loses his fingers in a workshop accident. Time seems to slow down as another inmate, Donnie Pfaster (Nick Chinlund)—a "death fetishist" and serial killer who kidnapped Dana Scully (Gillian Anderson) five years earlier—walks out of the room and leaves the prison. Hearing about the escape, Scully and Fox Mulder (David Duchovny) investigate. They learn that three men escaped from three prisons, all of whom had contact with a prison chaplain named Reverend Orison (Scott Wilson). Eventually, the US Marshals corner Pfaster and Orison at a diner, but Orison uses his power of persuasion to distract the Marshals, allowing the two to escape. Pfaster takes Orison's car and runs him over. Meanwhile, Scully keeps hearing the Dennis Edwards song "Don't Look Any Further" everywhere she goes, soon believing it is a sign. The agents find and question Orison, who is himself an ex-convict and claims that he is doing the work of God.

After a medical exam, Mulder finds out that Orison has three times the bloodflow capacity of the brain due to a hole he has drilled into his own head, allowing him to perform mental tricks by hypnotizing people. Orison hypnotizes the security guard in his room and easily escapes. Meanwhile, at Orison's apartment, a prostitute escapes when Pfaster attacks her for wearing a wig. Orison then finds Pfaster and takes him at gunpoint. In the woods, Orison digs a grave for Pfaster, who morphs into a demonic beast and kills him, burying him in his own shallow grave. Pfaster then calls the police, telling them where Orison is buried, and goes to Scully's house. He attacks Scully, who tells him that the only reason he was not given the death penalty was because she asked the judge for life. He overpowers her and locks her in her own closet. Mulder thinks something may be wrong when he hears the same song on his radio and calls Scully. After receiving no answer, he goes over to her house and stumbles upon Pfaster, promptly arresting him. Meanwhile, Scully escapes from the closet and shoots Pfaster, despite him being unarmed, killing him. Scully later confides in Mulder, telling him she's scared because she's not sure who's in control of her, God or something else.

== Production ==
=== Writing ===
"Orison" was written by Chip Johannessen, who had formerly been an executive producer on the Chris Carter-created television series Millennium. In Johannessen's first draft of the episode, the main antagonist was a prisoner who could stop time. Executive producers Carter, Frank Spotnitz, and John Shiban found the premise promising, with Carter enjoying the story because it bore stylistic similarities to the first season episode "Beyond the Sea".

After reading the first draft, Spotnitz and Carter decided to reintroduce Donnie Pfaster, a character from the second season episode "Irresistible". Carter noted that, "we had talked about possibly revisiting some old monster this season, and this seemed like the perfect opportunity." In his first appearance, Donnie Pfaster was portrayed as a "death fetishist", with his brief appearances in the guise of a demon intended to reflect the psychological impact of being held captive. Although the character's ambiguous presentation remains consistent, in "Orison" it was decided to approach Pfaster as a true demon. Shiban explained "we decided late in the process to turn him into this totally demonic character, essentially evil as an entity."

Spotnitz was very excited about bringing closure to the Pfaster-Scully story, saying, "For me, what really justified bringing Donnie back was the final act of the script when Donnie comes for Scully and she ends up shooting him full of holes." The final scene, however, proved difficult to script. Director Rob Bowman noted, that the act "was a tough scene. Frank and I had spoken on the phone about the dialogue in the wrap-up scene with Mulder and Scully. Even though she shot him in the heightened state, you couldn't deny the fact that she killed Donnie Psaster [sic] in cold blood. How do we deal with that?"

=== Casting and filming ===
Nick Chinlund returned to the series to reprise his role as Pfaster. Rick Millikan, the show's casting director, eventually settled on Scott Wilson for the role of Orison believing that he could pull off the "dual nature" of the character better than anyone else. The episode featured several scenes making use of complex effects, most notably the shot at the beginning, where time grinds to a halt. Bowman used several different takes, all filmed at different speeds and then combined in post-production, to achieve the right effect. The final fight scene between Scully and Pfaster, which takes up only a small portion of the episode, took over a day to film. Many of the episodes scenes were filmed in Downey, California. Make-up for the episode was done by John Vulich, who sought to "pay homage" to the make-up in the original episode. Vulich perused several fan sites and downloaded photos from "Irresistible" to aid him in this process.

=== Music ===
The song in the episode that Scully keeps hearing is a cover version of the song "Don't Look Any Further", originally by former Temptations lead singer Dennis Edwards. The production staff went through several cover versions in order to find the right one for the episode. Unfortunately, according to Paul Rabwin, none of the songs "really worked." Rabwin wanted Lyle Lovett to record a cover for the episode, but he was unavailable, so the staff asked singer-songwriter John Hiatt, whose version Rabwin later called "chilling, eerie, and soulful." Mark Snow, the show's composer, used various musical effects for emphasis, explaining: "There's a slo-mo scene where Mulder comes in the room with Scully and guns are drawn. They're looking around, and I do these big boom single hits with a lot of reverb. There's nothing else but that. Sometimes, that is really effective."

== Broadcast and reception ==
"Orison" first aired in the United States on January 9, 2000. This episode earned a Nielsen rating of 9.4, with a 14 share, meaning that roughly 9.4 percent of all television-equipped households, and 14 percent of households watching television, were tuned in to the episode. It was viewed by 15.63 million viewers. The episode aired in the United Kingdom and Ireland on Sky1 on April 30, 2000. and received 0.78 million viewers, making it the fourth most watched television episode of any program that week.

The episode received mixed reviews from critics. Kenneth Silber from Space.com wrote positively of the episode, saying, "'Orison' rises above its origins in the depressing, hackneyed genre of serial-killer dramas. The episode combines a fast pace with a richly gloomy mood, and even serves to blur the all-too-sharp distinction between standalone X-Files stories and the series' 'mythology arc.'" Rich Rosell from Digitally Obsessed awarded the episode 4.5 out of 5 stars and called the episode "creepy, dark and wonderful". Tom Kessenich, in his book Examinations, gave the episode a largely positive review, writing "['Orison'] was a journey filled with horror, mystery, and self-analysis. It was also one of the most exhilarating journeys the seventh season has produced thus far." Furthermore, Kessenich defended Scully's actions at the end of the episode writing that "what we saw at the end of 'Orison' was a human being pushed beyond the breaking point by a man [...] it doesn't make what she did right, but it certainly wasn't a difficult thing to understand." Zack Handlen of The A.V. Club awarded the episode a "B" and felt that the episode, despite its faults, had elements that were particularly interesting. He noted that the titular chaplain was a "potentially fascinating figure" who was never explored to his full extent, and that the ending was effective in that it "helps transform the episode’s climax into something more than a simple regurgitation". Finally, he positively compared the mood and thematic elements of the episode to Carter's other series Millennium.

Not all reviews were positive. Robert Shearman, in his book Wanting to Believe: A Critical Guide to The X-Files, Millennium & The Lone Gunmen, was extremely critical of the episode and rated it one star out of five. Shearman called it a "mess" that "cheapens 'Irresistible' badly". The author highlighted the sequence wherein Scully murders Pfaster as the worst scene in the episode, arguing that it was "at worst a betrayal of characterization that has badly damaged the moral fibre of the series." Paula Vitaris from Cinefantastique gave the episode a largely negative review and awarded it one star out of four. Vitaris heavily criticized the episode as "a retread of 'Irresistible'". Furthermore, she derided the ending, noting that "nothing in the episode [indicated] that Scully [was] on the verge of losing her self-control".

== See also ==
- List of unmade episodes of The X-Files

== Bibliography ==
- Hurwitz, Matt; Knowles, Chris (2008). The Complete X-Files. Insight Editions. ISBN 978-1-933784-80-9.
- Kessenich, Tom (2002). Examination: An Unauthorized Look at Seasons 6–9 of the X-Files. Trafford Publishing. ISBN 1-55369-812-6.
- Shapiro, Marc (2000). All Things: The Official Guide to the X-Files Volume 6. Harper Prism. ISBN 0-06-107611-2.
- Shearman, Robert (2009). Wanting to Believe: A Critical Guide to The X-Files, Millennium & The Lone Gunmen. Mad Norwegian Press. ISBN 978-0-9759446-9-1.
