= Fresh Bones =

- The X-Files episode
- Episode no.: Season 2 Episode 15
- Directed by: Rob Bowman
- Written by: Howard Gordon
- Production code: 2X15
- Original air date: February 3, 1995
- Running time: 45 minutes

Guest appearances
- Bruce Young as Pierre Bauvais; Daniel Benzali as Colonel Wharton; Jamil Walker Smith as Chester Bonaparte; Matt Hill as Private Harry Dunham; Callum Keith Rennie as the groundskeeper; Kevin Conway as Private Jack McAlpin; Katya Gardner as Robin McAlpin; Steven Williams as X

Episode chronology
← Previous "Die Hand Die Verletzt"	Next → "Colony"
- The X-Files season 2

"Fresh Bones" is the fifteenth episode of the second season of the science fiction television series The X-Files. It premiered on the Fox network on February 3, 1995. It was written by Howard Gordon, directed by Rob Bowman, and featured guest appearances by Kevin Conway, Daniel Benzali, and Matt Hill. The episode is a "Monster-of-the-Week" story, unconnected to the series' wider mythology. "Fresh Bones" earned a Nielsen household rating of 11.3, being watched by 10.8 million households in its initial broadcast. The episode received mixed to positive reviews from critics.

The show centers on FBI special agents Fox Mulder (David Duchovny) and Dana Scully (Gillian Anderson) who work on cases linked to the paranormal, called X-Files. In the episode, Mulder and Scully discover a voodoo symbol drawn on a tree after a soldier, Private Jack McAlpin, crashes his car into it following two separate hallucinatory incidents. This leads the two to a processing center for Haitian refugees where suspicion falls on one of the Haitians identified by the colonel in charge.

Howard Gordon was inspired to write the episode after reading two articles involving suicides of servicemen in Haiti. The Haitian refugee camp was shot in a derelict building in a North Vancouver shipyard; originally, the producers wanted to set the episode in Haiti and actually film in the country. This endeavor, however, proved unsuccessful.

== Plot ==
In Folkstone, North Carolina, Jack McAlpin, an agitated Marine Corps private, drives his car into a tree after several hallucinatory episodes and is apparently killed. On the tree is a veve, a drawn voodoo religious symbol.

McAlpin is the second purported suicide among troops stationed at an Immigration and Naturalization Service compound processing refugees from Haiti. Fox Mulder and Dana Scully visit the compound to investigate McAlpin's death. There, a young boy named Chester Bonaparte sells a good luck charm to Mulder. After meeting with Colonel Wharton, the head of the compound, Mulder interviews an imprisoned refugee, Pierre Bauvais, and an associate of McAlpin's, Harry Dunham. When Scully attempts to perform an autopsy on McAlpin's body, she finds a dog carcass in its place at the morgue.

While driving down the road, Mulder and Scully discover a still-living McAlpin, who doesn't remember what has happened to him. Tetrodotoxin, a chemical Mulder believes is part of Haitian zombification rituals, is found in McAlpin's blood. The agents go to the local graveyard to investigate the corpse of the other dead soldier, but find the grave robbed. They also find Chester, who collects frogs at the cemetery and sells them to Bauvais. Dunham approaches Mulder, telling him that Wharton has begun abusing the refugees as a means of retaliation against Bauvais; Wharton denies the accusations, but later has Bauvais beaten to death.

Scully cuts her hand on the thorn of a twig left in her car. When she drives off, a veve is seen on the ground under the car. Mulder has a meeting with X, who tells him that he and Scully will soon be called back to Washington and that the camp will be restricted to military personnel only. Mulder believes Wharton is persecuting the refugees after the suicide of some of his men during a previous trip to Haiti. Scully finds Dunham dead in a bathtub, and Mulder catches McAlpin with a knife nearby. Although he has no recollection of the event, McAlpin confesses to be the murderer under the influence of Wharton, who tells the agents that Bauvais committed suicide and that their investigation is over.

McAlpin's wife provides the agents with a photo of Wharton with Bauvais in Haiti, causing the agents to go through his office. They find that both Dunham and McAlpin had filed complaints against Wharton over his treatment of the detainees. The agents head to the cemetery, where Wharton is performing a voodoo rite over Bauvais' coffin. When Mulder confronts him, Wharton harms him through sympathetic magic. Meanwhile, in a hallucinatory episode, a man emerges from the small cut in Scully's hand and strangles her, but the illusion disappears when she grabs the charm Chester sold them. Bauvais appears and stops Wharton by blowing tetrodotoxin in his face. Scully arrives to assist Mulder and pronounces Wharton dead. Scully opens Bauvais' coffin and finds his body still intact.

The next day, the agents say goodbye to McAlpin, who reveals that Chester was a boy who had died in a riot six weeks earlier. The episode ends with Wharton being unwittingly buried alive by the graveyard watchman.

== Production ==
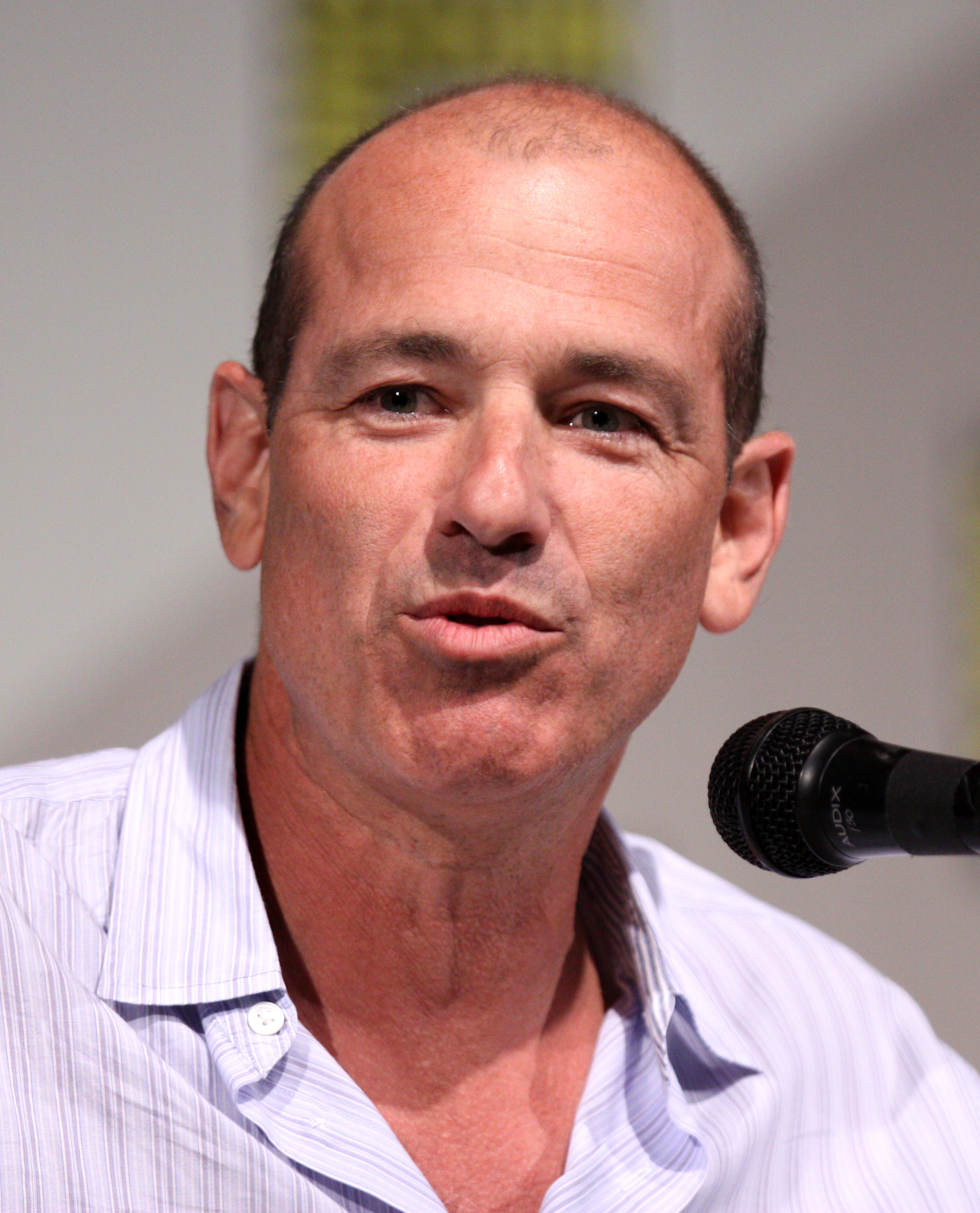
Howard Gordon wrote "Fresh Bones" after reading about suicides of servicemen in Haiti.

"Fresh Bones" was written by Howard Gordon after he read two magazine articles detailing a number of U.S. military personnel killing themselves while stationed in Haiti. The refugee plot was used due to the producers being unable to actually film in Haiti. Colonel Wharton was portrayed by Daniel Benzali. While the producers agreed that he did not "look like a military man", they unanimously agreed that he had the quality they were looking for in the role.

Production for the episode began in late December 1994 and was completed in January 1995. The Haitian refugee camp was shot in a derelict building in a North Vancouver shipyard. While filming the graveyard scenes, a sump pump had to be used because the scenes were filmed during extremely rainy weather. To film the scene in which a man emerges from Scully's hand and strangles her, series' makeup artist Toby Lindala explained: "We had a mechanical hand and had a guy doubling the actor's hand stuff his fingers up through it. There was gelatin skin on the hands which I thought played very well and was believable and fleshy. The hand double had tubes attached to his fingers so as he pushed up it tore it open a little bit and you see the plasma and the skin rips. They played that so well in the final cut."

== Broadcast and reception ==
"Fresh Bones" premiered on the Fox network on February 3, 1995. The episode earned a Nielsen rating of 11.3, with a 19 share, meaning that roughly 11.3 percent of all television-equipped households, and 19 percent of households watching television, were tuned in to the episode. It was viewed by 10.8 million households. "Fresh Bones" was the highest rated episode of the first two seasons.

The episode received mixed to positive reviews from critics. Writer Gordon stated that director Bowman did a great job in mining his script for chills. In their book, X-Treme Possibilities, authors Keith Topping and Paul Cornell praised the episode, including Benzali's performance and the sequence in the graveyard at the end of the episode. Series creator Chris Carter called the episode one of the ones he was most proud of from the second season, stating that Gordon did a good job with the script and Bowman did a great job with the directing.

Not all of the reviews were glowing. Entertainment Weekly gave the episode a B− and a more mixed review, writing that the episode was "Not one for the ages, despite some jarring moments (car meets tree, Scully's hoodoo hallucinations, and that final shot — whoa)." Reviewer Emily St. James of The A.V. Club gave the episode a C, and wrote that "the biggest problems here are the lack of focus and the chaotic pacing. The episode rumbles along in first gear for about three-quarters of its running time and then abruptly shifts into high gear at the end, moving toward an apocalyptic finish that doesn't feel wholly earned. There's good stuff in 'Fresh Bones,' but the bulk of the episode disappoints."

== Bibliography ==
- Cornell, Paul; Day, Martin; Topping, Keith (1998). X-Treme Possibilities. Virgin Publications, Ltd. ISBN 0-7535-0228-3.
- Edwards, Ted (1996). X-Files Confidential. Little, Brown and Company. ISBN 0-316-21808-1.
- Gradnitzer, Louisa; Pittson, Todd (1999). X Marks the Spot: On Location with The X-Files. Arsenal Pulp Press. ISBN 1-55152-066-4.
- Lovece, Frank (1996). The X-Files Declassified. Citadel Press. ISBN 0-8065-1745-X.
- Lowry, Brian (1995). The Truth is Out There: The Official Guide to The X-Files. Harper Prism. ISBN 0-06-105330-9.
