= Red Museum =

- The X-Files episode
- Episode no.: Season 2 Episode 10
- Directed by: Win Phelps
- Written by: Chris Carter
- Production code: 2X10
- Original air date: December 9, 1994
- Running time: 45 minutes

Guest appearances
- Paul Sand as Gerd Thomas; Steve Eastin as Sheriff Mazeroski; Mark Rolston as Richard Odin; Lindsey Ginter as Crew Cut Man; Robert Clothier as Old Man

Episode chronology
← Previous "Firewalker"	Next → "Excelsis Dei"
- The X-Files season 2

"Red Museum" is the tenth episode of the second season of the science fiction television series The X-Files. It premiered on the Fox network on December 9, 1994. It was written by Chris Carter, directed by Win Phelps, and featured guest appearances by Steve Eastin, Mark Rolston, Paul Sand, Bob Frazer, and Robert Clothier. The episode helps to explore the series' overarching mythology. "Red Museum" earned a Nielsen household rating of 10.4, being watched by 9.9 million households in its initial broadcast. The episode received mostly mixed reviews from critics.

The show centers on FBI special agents Fox Mulder (David Duchovny) and Dana Scully (Gillian Anderson) who work on cases linked to the paranormal, called X-Files. In the episode, Mulder and Scully travel to Wisconsin after several teens are found wandering in the woods in their underwear with “He Is One” or “She Is One” scrawled on their backs. However, the duo soon stumble upon a strange cult of vegetarian “walk-ins.”

Originally, the episode was slated to be a crossover episode with the CBS show Picket Fences. However, the networks nixed the idea before any filming could begin. A facet of the episode, that the adherents of the Red Museum believe that the year 2012 will bring about the dawning of The New Age, is later referenced in the series' finale "The Truth", seven seasons later.

== Plot ==
Fox Mulder and Dana Scully are called in to investigate a number of kidnappings in Delta Glen, Wisconsin, where local teenagers have been found half-naked and drugged with either the phrase "He is one" or "She is one" written on their backs. Interviewing a kidnap victim, the agents initially suspect a nearby cult, the Church of the Red Museum, founded by vegetarian named Richard Odin. Mulder, Scully and the local sheriff, Mazeroski, attend a ceremony of the cult, causing Mulder to believe that members of the cult are walk-ins, people whose souls have been taken over by a spirit.

After an altercation between the agents and four teenagers, including the Sheriff's son Rick and Rick's girlfriend Katie, Katie is kidnapped and found the next morning. On examination, her blood is found to contain an unknown alkaloid substance and high levels of scopolamine. Mulder and Scully conclude that only medical personnel would have access to scopolamine, leading them to increasingly suspect Odin, a former doctor. The agents bring Odin in for questioning but are interrupted by a confrontation outside, in which a large group of Red Museum members has blocked access to the local BBQ restaurant.

An old man in a truck leads the agents to two men injecting growth hormone into cattle. The old man believes the tainted beef is making the locals more violent and aggressive. That night, Jerrold Larson, the local doctor, is killed in a plane crash. An investigation turns up evidence that trace back to the kidnapped teens, implicating Larson. Meanwhile, one of the men injecting the cows is murdered by the Crew Cut Man. Mulder and Scully visit Beth, the mother of a kidnapped victim who reveals that Larson was giving her child "vitamin shots." Mulder notices light coming from the bathroom mirror and discovers a hidden room full of videotapes and a camera.

After being abducted from his car, Rick is found dead in a similar fashion as the other kidnapped teens, except with a bullet wound; the Crew Cut Man is seen leaving the area. The agents investigate another resident, Gerd Thomas, on suspicion of Rick's murder and the hidden room. During questioning, Gerd tells Mulder that Larson had been paying him to inoculate the cows with the same "vitamin shots" injected into the children. Convinced that they were turning into monsters, Gerd kidnapped the children and drugged them with scopolamine and psychedelics to make them "pure" again. During the interrogation, Scully recalls and recognizes the Crew Cut Man as the assassin who killed Deep Throat.

A toxicology report reveals the presence of a mysterious substance known as "Purity Control", leading Mulder to theorize that Larson had been injecting the children with alien DNA. He convinces Mazeroski to round up all of the families of Larson's patients, believing their lives to be in danger, and have them hidden at the Church of the Red Museum. Mulder tracks down the Crew Cut Man at a beef processing plant that has been doused with gasoline. The Crew Cut Man locks Mulder in a freezer and lights a match. Scully, Mazeroski and his deputies arrive, interrupting the Crew Cut Man's attempts to destroy the plant. Mazeroski kills the Crew Cut Man in revenge for Rick's murder, to Mulder's dismay.

Scully reports that the Crew Cut Man had no records on file with the FBI or other agencies. The material injected into the cows and children is found to be an unknown substance. All the children who were inoculated came down with a flu-like illness, but those in the Church of the Red Museum, being vegetarians, did not become ill. Scully thinks the Church of the Red Museum may have been used as a control group without their knowledge and declares the case open and unsolved.

== Production ==
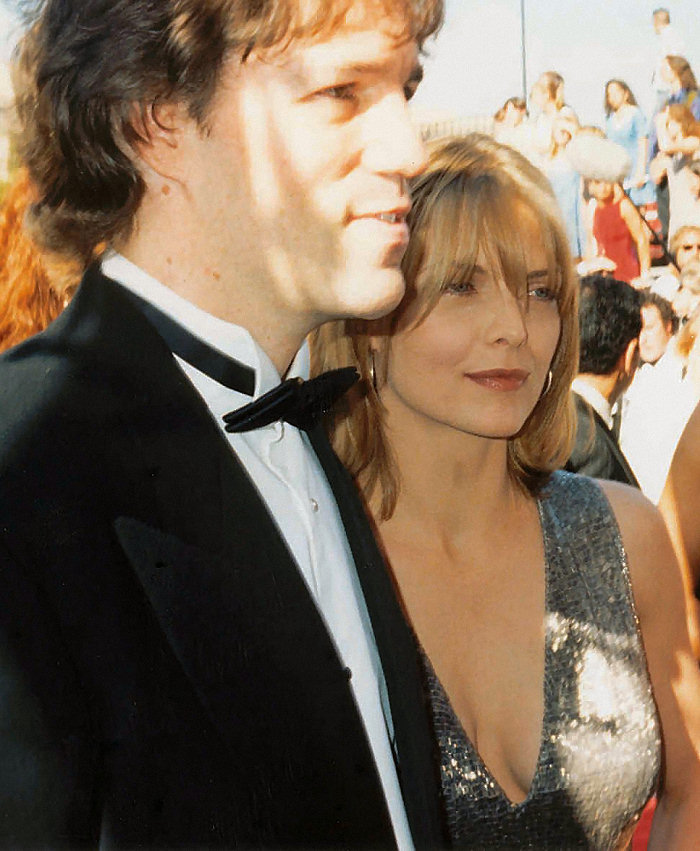
David E. Kelley (left), series creator of Picket Fences initially wanted to make "Red Museum" a crossover

The original draft of "Red Museum" functioned as a crossover episode with the CBS show Picket Fences—an idiosyncratic drama that ran from 1992 until 1996 and was set in the fictional Wisconsin town of Rome. This idea came about when David E. Kelley (the creator of Picket Fences) and Chris Carter (the creator of The X-Files) were talking in a parking lot about how interesting it would be to have Mulder and Scully visit Rome.

Kelley and Carter started to plan out ideas, agreeing that unlike traditional crossovers, the two shows would each air their own episode, featuring characters from the other series. However, CBS vetoed the crossover idea. Executive producer Robert Goodwin said of the experience: "I spent days on the phone with a producer of Picket Fences. We spent days organizing our schedules. Then at the very last minute, of course, we found out that no one had told CBS, and they said 'Forget it. We're having enough trouble on Friday nights without publicizing The X-Files.' It's too bad." The Picket Fences episode originally intended to crossover with The X-Files was called "Away in the Manger" and aired the week following "Red Museum." While every reference to Picket Fences was purged from The X-Files episode, the Picket Fences episode contains a few subtle references to the happenings in "Red Museum", including a mention of Dr. Larson.

Producer and writer Glen Morgan was disappointed with how the Crew Cut Man was killed off in the episode, saying, "My feeling is that to bring this guy back, his presence should have been better developed, and he's shot off screen. I thought 'Geez, this is the guy who killed Deep Throat, who the audience loved, and it's kind of tossed away.' The episode just seems like half of one thing for a while, then half of something else. I think that was a curious choice for Chris [Carter]. He wanted to take a real left turn, but I'd rather have seen a whole episode about that guy showing up and Mulder getting back at him." Morgan's writer partner James Wong disliked the episode, saying, "I think that was one of the most confusing episodes I've ever seen. It had some really neat ideas in it, but I don't think it pulled together finally."

Ladner, British Columbia served as a location for Delta Glen, while the beef processing plant was shot in a facility in Cloverdale; local employees at the latter were even used as extras in the butchering and cleaning up scenes. The episode is the first in the series to mention the concept of walk-ins, a plot device that would later be used five seasons later, when the truth about Samantha's abduction was finally revealed.

== Broadcast and reception ==
"Red Museum" premiered on the Fox network on December 9, 1994. This episode earned a Nielsen rating of 10.4, with an 18 share, meaning that roughly 10.4 percent of all television-equipped households, and 18 percent of households watching television, were tuned in to the episode. It was viewed by 9.9 million households.

The episode received mostly mixed reviews from critics. Entertainment Weekly gave "Red Museum" a B, noting that the episode was "creative if convoluted." Reviewer Zack Handlen of The A.V. Club criticized the way "Red Museum" was written, writing that the episode, "tries the neat trick of combining what appears to be a [Monster-of-the-Week] ep with mythos; the results are intriguing, but not entirely successful." He concluded that the episode was "good" but ultimately "forgettable."

== Bibliography ==
- Edwards, Ted (1996). X-Files Confidential. Little, Brown and Company. ISBN 0-316-21808-1.
- Gradnitzer, Louisa; Pittson, Todd (1999). X Marks the Spot: On Location with The X-Files. Arsenal Pulp Press. ISBN 1-55152-066-4.
- Hurwitz, Matt & Knowles, Chris (2008). The Complete X-Files: Behind the Series the Myths and the Movies. New York, US: Insight Editions. ISBN 978-1-933784-72-4.
- Lovece, Frank (1996). The X-Files Declassified. Citadel Press. ISBN 0-8065-1745-X.
- Lowry, Brian (1995). The Truth is Out There: The Official Guide to The X-Files. Harper Prism. ISBN 0-06-105330-9.
