= Aubrey (The X-Files) =

- The X-Files episode
- Episode no.: Season 2 Episode 12
- Directed by: Rob Bowman
- Written by: Sara B. Charno
- Production code: 2X12
- Original air date: January 6, 1995
- Running time: 45 minutes

Guest appearances
- Terry O'Quinn as Lt. Brian Tillman; Deborah Strang as Detective BJ Morrow; Morgan Woodward as Harry Cokely; Joy Coghill as Linda Thibedeaux

Episode chronology
← Previous "Excelsis Dei"	Next → "Irresistible"
- The X-Files season 2

"Aubrey" is the twelfth episode of the second season of the American science fiction television series The X-Files, and the thirty-sixth episode overall. It premiered on the Fox network in the United States on January 6, 1995. It was written by Sara B. Charno and directed by Rob Bowman. The episode is a "Monster-of-the-Week" story, unconnected to the series' wider mythology. "Aubrey" received a Nielsen rating of 10.2 and was watched by 9.7 million households. The episode received mixed to positive reviews from television critics.

The show centers on FBI special agents Fox Mulder (David Duchovny) and Dana Scully (Gillian Anderson) who work on cases linked to the paranormal, called X-Files. Mulder is a believer in the paranormal, while the skeptical Scully has been assigned to debunk his work. In the episode, Mulder and Scully believe that a serial killer from the 1940s passed his genetic trait of violence to his grandchild after a detective, BJ Morrow (Deborah Strang) mysteriously uncovers the remains of an FBI agent who disappeared almost fifty years before while investigating a modern-day murder case similar to the older cold case.

Although "Aubrey" was written by Charno, writers Glen Morgan and James Wong, who had written for The X-Files before, provided additional contributions to the story. The story for the episode developed around the concept of 50-year-old murders and the transfer of genetic memory. This was later combined with a separate concept about a female serial killer. Terry O'Quinn, who guest stars in the episode, would later play roles in the 1998 feature film, the ninth season episode "Trust No 1", become a recurring character as Peter Watts on Millennium, and appear on the short-lived series Harsh Realm. Strang's work on the episode was submitted for Emmy consideration.

== Plot ==
In the town of Aubrey, Missouri, local detective Betty June "B.J." Morrow tells Lt. Brian Tillman (Terry O'Quinn) that she has gotten pregnant from their affair. Tillman asks B.J. to meet him at a motel later that night. While waiting for him, B.J. has a vision that leads her to a field where she digs up the skeletal remains of an FBI agent.

Agents Fox Mulder (David Duchovny) and Dana Scully (Gillian Anderson) head to Aubrey, where the remains are identified as belonging to Agent Sam Chaney, who disappeared in the area with his partner, Tim Ledbetter, in 1942. The agents find discrepancies in B.J.'s story, but Tillman comes to her defense. Mulder tells Scully of the case Chaney and Ledbetter were investigating, which involved the rapes and murders of three women with the word "Sister" slashed on their chest. Discovering similar cuts on Chaney's chest during the autopsy, B.J. instinctively realizes that the cuts spell the word "Brother." B.J. admits her affair and pregnancy to Scully.

Tillman reveals that a new murder has occurred where a woman had the word "Sister" slashed on her chest. B.J. claims to have seen the victim in her dreams, which involve a man with a rash on his face and a monument which, after a quick sketch by B.J., Mulder recognizes as the Trylon and Perisphere from the 1939 New York World's Fair. Searching old mugshot photos, B.J. recognizes the man from her dream as Harry Cokely, who was arrested in 1945 for raping a woman named Linda Thibedeaux and slashing "Sister" on her chest. Scully believes that B.J. subconsciously recalled the case, since her father was a cop and may have discussed it. The agents visit the now-elderly Cokely, who lives alone after being released from prison in 1993. Cokely insists he was at home when the latest murder occurred.

B.J. awakens from a nightmare covered in blood, finding the word "Sister" slashed into her chest, and sees a young Cokely reflected in the mirror behind her. She heads to a stranger's basement and tears away the floorboards, revealing a skeleton that is found to be the remains of Agent Ledbetter. Cokely is arrested, but denies attacking B.J., insisting he's too old to even leave his house without his oxygen flask. Scully tells Mulder that blood on the latest victim matches Cokely's. The agents visit Thibedeaux, who describes her encounter with Cokely in the 1940s. Mulder notices a photo of her at the 1939 World's Fair. When pressed, Thibedeaux reveals that the rape resulted in a child, which she put up for adoption. The FBI tracks down the child, who turns out to have been B.J.'s father, causing Mulder to surmise that B.J. is the killer and may be operating on genetic memories which tend to skip a generation.

As the agents are on their way to intercept her, B.J. attacks Thibedeaux, but stops when she sees the "Sister" scars on her chest. The agents find Thibedeaux after B.J. has left, and head to Cokely's house, believing him to be her new target. B.J., who has already arrived, cuts Cokely's respirator tubes and attacks him with a razor. As Mulder is looking for them in the house, he is attacked by B.J. She threatens to cut his throat with the razor, at which Scully and Tillman compel her to stop. B.J. finally surrenders after Cokely dies. She is then placed in a female psychiatric ward, where she is put on suicide watch after attempting to self-abort.

== Production ==
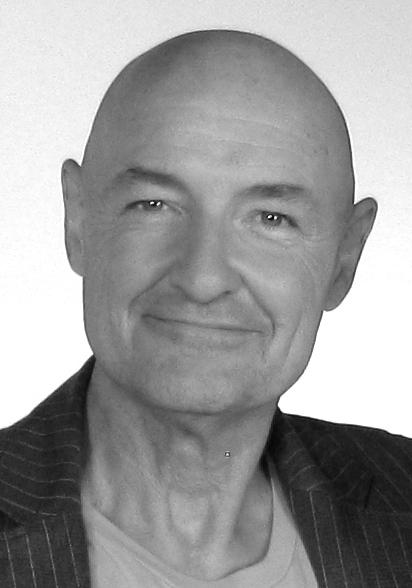
Terry O'Quinn guest starred in the episode.

"Aubrey" was written by Sara B. Charno, making it her first writing contribution to the series. The episode was directed by Rob Bowman. Charno's initial script revolved around "the concept of 50 year old murders and the transfer of genetic memory" before she expanded the premise, incorporating elements of another story idea revolving around a female serial killer. Glen Morgan and James Wong, who had written for The X-Files before, helped Charno refine the story, and the script was revised shortly before shooting, which resulted in newer scenes being added during production, such as the scene in which BJ attacks Mulder.

During the casting process, Morgan and Wong suggested that the show use Morgan Woodward, who had previously worked with them on the Fox series 21 Jump Street. Actor Terry O'Quinn, who appears in this episode as Lt. Brian Tillman, later appeared as two different characters in the 1998 feature film and the ninth-season episode "Trust No 1", respectively. He later had a recurring role as Peter Watts on Millennium, the sister series to The X-Files, and appeared in the short-lived series Harsh Realm. O'Quinn later earned the nickname "Mr. Ten Thirteen", due to his many appearance in shows and movies affiliated with Ten Thirteen Productions, the company that produced The X-Files.

Series creator Chris Carter was happy with the finished episode, later noting, "I think it came out great" and that "Rob Bowman came through for us and gave us an excellent job." Bowman himself later declared that he was proud of the scene in which BJ wakes up with blood on herself. Carter was also pleased with the episode's casting; he called Morgan Woodward "excellent" and said that Deborah Strang's performance was "top notch". Strang's performance was later submitted for an Emmy nomination, although she didn't make the final list.

== Reception ==
"Aubrey" premiered on the Fox network in the United States on January 6, 1995. This episode earned a Nielsen rating of 10.2, with a 16 share, meaning that roughly 10.2 percent of all television-equipped households, and 16 percent of households watching television, were tuned in to the episode. It was viewed by 9.7 million households.

The episode received mixed to positive reviews from television critics. Entertainment Weekly gave the episode a B, describing it as "a well-paced murder mystery with an inventive wrap-up". Robert Shearman, in his book Wanting to Believe: A Critical Guide to The X-Files, Millennium & The Lone Gunmen, rated the episode three-and-a-half stars out of five. Shearman positively critiqued the episode's "character study" of BJ Morrow, noting that it "makes this episode stand out". Shearman also complimented Strang's performance, writing that she "seizes the part and gives it dignity." However, he was critical of the genetic defect plot point, arguing that, because Strang's character is fleshed out, the reveal turns her into "a puppet of the paranormal".

Other reviews were more mixed. Zack Handlen of The A.V. Club said that most of "Aubrey" was "fun", although Tillman was not "particularly interesting". He stated that things got "dicey" for him around the revelation about Thibedeaux's child and that he did not buy Mulder's genetic impulse theories. He criticised the ending, writing that it "[sacrificed] whatever mood and character development the previous thirty had spent establishing for cheesy theatrics, and the whole thing lands with a resounding thud. There are too many problems with the concept; the nature/nurture debate has been going on for decades, and this ep throws the whole thing out the window in about two minutes. No other cause for BJ's actions is ever given. That's some lazy writing right there." Meghan Deans from Tor.com gave the episode a mixed review and wrote that it was "sort of good [but] sort of a terrible idea". She cited the theme of "breaking the cycle of abuse" as a plus for the entry, noting that it was a "revenge story [of] a woman righting the wrongs of her male ancestors and breaking the cycle of violence outside the family". However, Deans was critical of various elements of the episode, most notably, the genetic theory conceit and the idea of an "activator baby" that caused Morrow's past ancestors to work through her.

== Bibliography ==
- Edwards, Ted (1996). X-Files Confidential. Little, Brown and Company. ISBN 0316218081.
- Hurwitz, Matt & Knowles, Chris (2008). The Complete X-Files: Behind the Series the Myths and the Movies. New York, US: Insight Editions. ISBN 978-1933784724.
- Lovece, Frank (1996). The X-Files Declassified. Citadel Press. ISBN 080651745X.
- Lowry, Brian (1995). The Truth is Out There: The Official Guide to the X-Files. Harper Prism. ISBN 0061053309.
- Shearman, Robert (2009). Wanting to Believe: A Critical Guide to The X-Files, Millennium & The Lone Gunmen. Mad Norwegian Press. ISBN 978-0975944691.
