= Die Hand Die Verletzt =

- The X-Files episode
- Mrs. Paddock in the episode's climactic revelation
- Episode no.: Season 2 Episode 14
- Directed by: Kim Manners
- Written by: Glen Morgan; James Wong
- Production code: 2X14
- Original air date: January 27, 1995
- Running time: 45 minutes

Guest appearances
- Dan Butler as Jim Ausbury; Susan Blommaert as Phyllis H. Paddock; Heather McComb as Shannon Ausbury

Episode chronology
| ← Previous "Irresistible" | Next → "Fresh Bones" |
- The X-Files season 2

"Die Hand Die Verletzt" is the fourteenth episode of the second season of the science fiction television series The X-Files. It premiered on the Fox network on January 27, 1995. It was written by Glen Morgan and James Wong, directed by Kim Manners, and featured guest appearances by Susan Blommaert, Dan Butler, and Heather McComb. The episode is a "Monster-of-the-Week" story, unconnected to the series' wider mythology. "Die Hand Die Verletzt" earned a Nielsen household rating of 10.7, being watched by 10.2 million households in its initial broadcast. The episode received positive reviews, with many critics praising its writing. The title translates from German as "the hand that wounds."

The X-Files series centers on FBI special agents Fox Mulder (David Duchovny) and Dana Scully (Gillian Anderson) who work on cases linked to the paranormal, called X-Files. In this episode Mulder and Scully are called to Milford Haven, New Hampshire to investigate the death of a teenager who seems to have died during an occult ritual of some sort. As a result of their arrival in town a few of the local high school's faculty, who were raised as members of a secretive Satanic cult but whose zeal has waned, decide they should take steps to conceal their past activities. Matters are further complicated when the devil seems to have decided to personally interfere.

"Die Hand Die Verletzt" uses the lapsed devil-worshipers as a way to parody insincere followers of mainstream religions. When confronted with proof of their religion's claims the school faculty members are mostly worried about how their obligations could impact their secular lives, several being either scared or annoyed by the prospect of having to become devout. This was the last episode written by Morgan and Wong before they left to create Space: Above and Beyond. They decided to add several in-jokes with The X-Files creative team. The episode has several scenes involving animals, each filmed with living creatures. In one such scene frogs rain from the sky. Actor Dan Butler has been quoted as being terrified of an anaconda used during one scene.

== Plot ==
In Milford Haven, New Hampshire, a group of high school faculty members meet to discuss various social events. The adults initially appear to be socially conservative, debating the suitability of letting students perform Jesus Christ Superstar. However, when the group ends the meeting in a prayer, they recite a Satanic chant.

Later, a group of students venture into the woods at night to play with black magic, an attempt to "score" on the part of the boys in the group. The experiment causes unexplainable things to happen, and all but one of the teenagers flee. The remaining teen's mutilated body is discovered the next day, leading Fox Mulder (David Duchovny) and Dana Scully (Gillian Anderson) to investigate. Locals—including the Satanists—claim that the teens have unleashed a demonic force with their rituals. This theory is given validity by strange occurrences, such as frogs falling from the sky and water in the drinking fountain draining counter-clockwise, contrary to the Coriolis effect. Unknown to the agents, substitute teacher Mrs. Phyllis Paddock (Susan Blommaert) is behind the murder, keeping the eyes and heart of the victim in her desk. One of the faculty members, Jim Ausbury (Dan Butler), suspects one of the other Satanists killed the teen, but they believe it was an outside force.

While dissecting a pig fetus in science class, Ausbury's stepdaughter, Shannon (Heather McComb), suffers a breakdown when she hallucinates the cadaver as alive. Meeting with Mulder and Scully, she tearfully tells them that Ausbury and the other Satanists repeatedly raped and impregnated her during their rituals, sacrificing her babies. A shocked Ausbury denies the accusations. Shannon stays after school to make up her assignment of dissecting the pig. Paddock takes her bracelet and uses it as part of a spell that causes Shannon to slit her wrists.

When Ausbury learns that the Satanists plan to use Shannon as a scapegoat, he admits the sect's existence to Mulder. He confirms that rituals did happen while Shannon was present, but insists that exposure to sensational media coverage led her to "remember" the alleged sexual abuse. Meanwhile, Scully researches Paddock and finds that no one knows anything about her or her background. During a sudden power outage, Paddock steals Scully's pen and uses it to impersonate her in a call to Mulder, pretending to be in trouble. Mulder handcuffs Ausbury in his basement to prevent his possible escape, then leaves to help Scully. Soon after, a giant snake appears, controlled by Paddock, and devours Ausbury.

Mulder finds out that Scully never called him. The two find Paddock seemingly attacked by the remaining Satanists, and go to search for them. The Satanists capture the two agents, convinced that they need to perform a sacrifice to regain favor with the Devil and make up for their faltered faith. As they are about to kill Mulder and Scully, Paddock causes them to instead kill themselves, confirming that their attempt was too late. The agents escape their bonds and find Paddock missing, with only a parting message on the chalkboard stating, "Goodbye. It's been nice working with you."

== Production ==
=== Writing ===
"It was a fun script that turned this big corner when the girl had the emotional breakdown. It suddenly became a very creepy, dark, disturbing episode. It was vintage Glen and Jim, and we had a great, great performance by the guest stars. A really good, solid episode that actually veered a little more toward the horror genre. But it worked because of Mulder and Scully."

— Chris Carter, on the tone of the episode

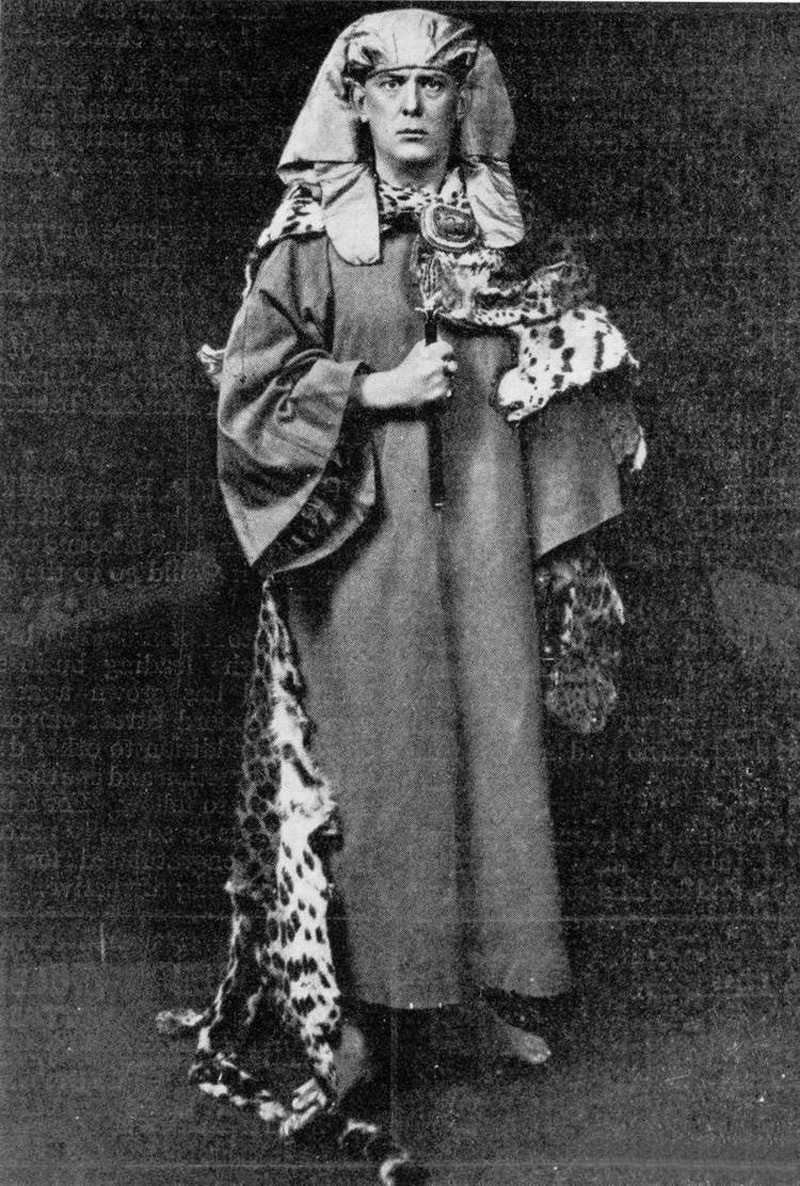
The high school in the episode was named after Aleister Crowley.

"Die Hand Die Verletzt", which was written by co-executive producers Glen Morgan and James Wong, was based on Morgan's idea to feature a snake eating a man in an episode. Morgan and co-writer James Wong left the series after this episode to produce the Fox series Space: Above and Beyond. The line written by Mrs. Paddock on a chalkboard at the end of the episode, "It's been nice working with you," also acted as a goodbye to the crew of the show. The two later returned to the show in the fourth season.

Series creator Chris Carter described the episode as "a cautionary tale about playing with fire, playing with things bigger and badder than you might imagine". In an interview, he also praised the purposefully clashing tones of the entry, noting that it begins almost comical, with the PTC saying Satanic prayers and toads raining from the skies. However, as it goes on, it becomes increasingly dark.

Some of the names used in this episode are popular culture or in-references of some sort. Crowley High School, the setting for most of the action, is a reference to British occultist Aleister Crowley. Mrs. Paddock's name was based on the toad demon Paddock in the first scene of Shakespeare's play MacBeth. The character Deborah Brown was based on a fan of the series who was active on the internet. Additionally, the inspiration for the character Paul Vitari Vitaris was a Cinefantastique critic and reviewer named Paula Vitaris. The episode's title means "The hand that wounds" in German. The title is taken from a part of the prayer said at the beginning, which, in its entirety is "Sein ist die Hand, die verletzt", meaning "His is the hand that wounds".

=== Directing and filming ===
"Die Hand Die Verletzt" was directed by Kim Manners, making it his first contribution to the series. (Manners would go on to be a prolific director, who directed many of the series' episodes). Originally, another director was supposed to helm this episode, but plans fell through and Manners was hired. The producers for the show were initially concerned about bringing Manners on board, as the director subscribed to the philosophy of Stephen J. Cannell, who strongly believed that writers and directors should work together to cast characters, select filming locations, and shoot episodes. According to Morgan, many at the time believe that this school of thought was "a lesser kind" of directing. However, Morgan was a champion for Manners, and thanks to the former's lobbying, the show finally allowed Manners to direct an episode.

The producers initially considered using fake frogs for the scene where they fall from the sky, but the "fake ones looked too bad and didn't hop away after command", according to Carter. As such, real frogs were brought in and dropped on the actors from a short distance, with camera angles being employed to make it look like they were falling from much higher. Shooting the scene in which the snake goes down the stairs proved to be a challenge, as the creature kept falling onto the floor after slithering down the steps. Actor Dan Butler was terrified of the animal, and he was unable to talk while shooting the scene in the basement. However, Butler's ophidiophobia had an up-side: the show's art department did not need to apply fake sweat to his face.

== Themes ==
Robert Shearman, in his book Wanting to Believe: A Critical Guide to The X-Files, Millennium & The Lone Gunmen, proposed that the episode is a parody of organized religion, most specifically those who follow a religion, but only pay it lip service. Shearman argues that the principal joke in the episode is "to look at the way religious faith has been so watered down and paid nothing but lip service, its rituals and doctrines reinterpreted so that only what's comfortable is adhered to." This parody, is turned on its head: the followers paying lip service in "Die Hand Die Verletzt" are not stereotypical Christians, but rather, devil worshippers. Shearman compares Mrs. Paddock—whom the episode insinuates to be the devil incarnate—coming to Milford Haven, New Hampshire to judge his followers to St. Paul "coming back and taking a pop at all fair weather Christians who only affirm their faith at their own convenience."

Emily St. James of The A.V. Club noted the recurring motif of doors. She highlighted various examples—such as the light emanating behind the door in the beginning of the episode, the door in which Mrs. Paddock hides when she kills people, and the door to Mr. Ausbury's basement in which the Satanic rituals took place—noting that "there's the whole notion of opening a door to another world and letting an ancient evil into our own".

== Reception ==
=== Ratings ===
"Die Hand Die Verletzt" premiered on the Fox network on January 27, 1995. The episode earned a Nielsen household rating of 10.7, with an 18 share. Nielsen ratings are audience measurement systems that determine the audience size and composition of television programming in the U.S. This means that roughly 10.7 percent of all television-equipped households, and 18 percent of households watching television, were watching the episode. It was viewed by 10.2 million households and over 17.7 million viewers. The episode later debuted in the United Kingdom on May 23, 1995 on Sky One.

=== Reviews ===
"Die Hand Die Verletzt" received early praise from critics. Entertainment Weekly gave "Die Hand Die Verletzt" an "A−", noting that, in the episode, "Mulder and Scully largely step aside in this wacky, wicked effort chock-full of stunning imagery and wry comment." The magazine praised Blommaert's acting, calling her "juicily diabolical". Paul Cornell, Martin Day, and Keith Topping, in their book X-Treme Possibilities, gave the episode mostly positive reviews, although they criticized the ending. Day applauded the episode's themes of "loss of faith … ritual abuse [and] repressed memories", along with the "great set pieces", and the plot twists. However, he was slightly critical that the episode did not have a solid conclusion, and that the identity of Mrs. Paddock was never revealed. Cornell was even more critical about the lack of closure, calling it "a vast unanswered question" and "very troubling in a show that's concerned with seeing the truth". However, he too was also complimentary towards the set pieces, calling them "groovy".

Later reviews were also complimentary. Emily St. James gave the episode an "A" and called it "a good example of the show heading in a different direction but still largely feeling like the same show." She praised the episode for being "fun [and] creepy". St. James also praised the final scene, noting that "rare that Mulder and Scully completely get played, but they do here, and it makes the episode an even better sick joke." Ultimately, she praised the "sick sense of humor", the "outright left turns into demented darkness", and "the horrifying visuals". Shearman awarded the episode five stars out of five, citing the "very good" conceit about organized religion, the humor, and the "great set pieces" as positive factors.

Nick De Semlyen and James White of Empire named it the fourth "greatest" episode of the series, describing it as a "thoroughly dark and creepy episode". Katie Anderson of Cinefantastique named the scene in which Shannon begins hallucinating that the pig fetus that she is dissecting is alive and screaming the fifth "Scariest Moment" in The X-Files. Connie Ogle from PopMatters ranked the members of the Satanic PTA as some of the "greatest" monsters-of-the-week, writing, "You don’t want to cross the Satan-worshiping teachers at this high school, but there are more vengeful evil forces to displease."

C. Eugene Emery, Jr. wrote in Skeptical Inquirer that: "In one scene, Mulder expressed amazement on the counterclockwise motion of the water draining from a fountain. He stated that the motion of the water should be clockwise because of the effect of the Coriolis force in the area. The writers presented incorrect scientific data since it was normal for water to drain in such a motion. Was it an honest mistake, or was it a deliberate attempt to spook viewers?"

== Bibliography ==
- Cornell, Paul; Day, Martin; Topping, Keith (1998). X-Treme Possibilities. Virgin Publications, Ltd. ISBN 9780753502280.
- Edwards, Ted (1996). X-Files Confidential. Little, Brown and Company. ISBN 9780316218085.
- Lovece, Frank (1996). The X-Files Declassified. Citadel Press. ISBN 9780806517452.
- Lowry, Brian (1995). The Truth is Out There: The Official Guide to the X-Files. Harper Prism. ISBN 9780061053306.
- Rozum, John (1997). "Grey Matters". Sky Buster (Graphic Novel). 1. Vol. 34. Topps.
- Shearman, Robert (2009). Wanting to Believe: A Critical Guide to The X-Files, Millennium & The Lone Gunmen. Mad Norwegian Press. ISBN 9780975944691.
