= Nick Chinlund =

American actor

- Born: Zareh Nicholas Chinlund; November 18, 1961 (age 64); New York City, US
- Occupation: Actor
- Known for: Voicing Sportsmaster

Zareh Nicholas Chinlund (born November 18, 1961) is an American actor and voice actor in television, film, and video games.

== Personal life ==
Zareh Nicholas Chinlund was born in New York City on November 18.

== Career ==
Chinlund performed on General Hospital as Mickey Diamond until July 30, 2014. The website Behind the Voice Actors described him as being best known for voicing the character Sportsmaster.

=== Credits ===
Film performances
Year	Title	Role	Citation(s)
1992	Lethal Weapon 3	Hatchett	
1995	A Letter to My Killer	Nick Parma	
1996	Eraser	Agent Calderon	
1997	A Brother's Kiss	Lex Moriarty	
1997	Con Air	Billy Bedlam	
1997	Mr. Magoo	Bob Morgan	
2001	Training Day	Tim	
2003	Tears of the Sun	Michael 'Slo' Slowenski	
2004	The Chronicles of Riddick	Toombs	
2004	The Chronicles of Riddick: Dark Fury	Toombs (voice)	
2005	The Legend of Zorro	Jacob McGivens	
2006	Ultraviolet		
2007	Sinner	Anthony Romano	
2008	The Onion Movie	Bryce Brand	
2009	Wyvern	Jake	
2015	Close Range	Sheriff Jasper Calloway	

Television performances
Year	Title	Role	Episode(s)	Citation(s)
1995–2000	The X-Files	Donnie Pfaster	"Irresistible" & "Orison"	
1996	Mortal Kombat: Defenders of the Realm	Quan Chi (voice)		
1996	The Real Adventures of Jonny Quest	Temple (voice)		
2000	Gilmore Girls	Ian Jack	"The Lorelais' First Day at Chilton"	
2002	Law & Order: Special Victims Unit	Matthew Linwood Brodus	"Execution"	
2007	Criminal Minds	Max Weston	“Distress”	
2010	Young Justice	Sportsmaster (voice)		
2011	Law & Order: Criminal Intent	Jack Driscoll	"The Last Street in Manhattan"	
2022	The Terminal List	Rear Admiral Gerald Pillar	"The Engram", "Encoding", "Transience", "Extinction" & "Reclamation"	

Video game performances
Year	Title	Role	Citation(s)
2013	Young Justice: Legacy	Sportsmaster (voice)	
