= Ascension (The X-Files) =

- The X-Files episode
- Special agent Dana Scully kidnapped and gagged by Duane Barry
- Episode no.: Season 2 Episode 6
- Directed by: Michael Lange
- Written by: Paul Brown
- Production code: 2X06
- Original air date: October 21, 1994
- Running time: 45 minutes

Guest appearances
- Steve Railsback as Duane Barry; Mitch Pileggi as Walter Skinner; Nicholas Lea as Alex Krycek; Sheila Larken as Margaret Scully; Steven Williams as X; William B. Davis as The Smoking Man; Peter LaCroix as aerial tramway technician

Episode chronology
| ← Previous "Duane Barry" | Next → "3" |
- The X-Files season 2

"Ascension" is the sixth episode of the second season of the American science fiction television series The X-Files. It premiered on the Fox network on October 21, 1994. It was written by Paul Brown, directed by Michael Lange, and featured guest appearances by Steve Railsback, Nicholas Lea, Steven Williams and Sheila Larken. The episode helped explore the series' overarching mythology.

The show centers on FBI special agents Fox Mulder (David Duchovny) and Dana Scully (Gillian Anderson) who work on cases linked to the paranormal, called X-Files. However, the events of "Ascension" are a continuation of the plot of the preceding episode, "Duane Barry". Following the kidnapping of Scully by an unhinged alien abductee Duane Barry (Steve Railsback), Mulder races to track her down.

The decision to have the character of Scully abducted was driven by necessity, as Anderson had become pregnant and required time off from production. "Ascension" earned a Nielsen household rating of 9.6, being watched by 9.2 million households in its initial broadcast, and received positive reviews from critics.

== Plot ==
Upon hearing Dana Scully's (Gillian Anderson) kidnapping by Duane Barry as she leaves a message on his answering machine, Fox Mulder (David Duchovny) heads to her apartment and surveys the crime scene. He meets with her mother, Margaret, who has had a dream about Scully being taken away. The next morning, Assistant Director Walter Skinner tells Mulder that he is "too close" to the case to be involved, and orders Alex Krycek (Nicholas Lea) to escort him home. Meanwhile, Barry speeds down the Blue Ridge Parkway when he is pulled over by a highway patrol officer. When Scully—locked in the trunk—tries to get the officer's attention, Barry kills him. Mulder reviews a video of the traffic stop, and sees that Scully is still alive.

Mulder realizes that Barry is heading to a ski resort at Skyland Mountain, the location of his original abduction; he is attempting to follow through with his original plan of having the aliens abduct someone there in his place. Krycek informs the Smoking Man (William B. Davis) of these findings before departing with Mulder. When they arrive, Mulder boards the resort's aerial tramway in the hopes of reaching the mountain's peak before Barry. However, Krycek tries to delay Mulder by sabotaging the tramway's journey upward. Mulder manages to complete the journey and witnesses a strange light in the area. Upon finding Barry's car, Mulder sees no trace of Scully except her necklace. He then encounters a joyous Barry, who claims that she was taken by "them."

When Mulder interrogates Barry, he becomes so enraged that he nearly strangles him, only to stop himself. When he leaves the room, he orders Krycek to not let anyone inside; however, he finds Krycek talking to Barry when he returns. When Skinner arrives moments later, Barry breaks into convulsions and dies. Later, at the FBI Academy in Quantico, Mulder attempts to question the doctor who performed Barry's autopsy; she refuses to provide details since it was performed by the military instead of the FBI, claiming no other doctors were available.

Krycek meets with the Smoking Man and suggests that they kill Mulder. However, the Smoking Man orders that Mulder be left alive, unless they want to risk "turning one man's religion into a crusade". Mulder and Krycek are ordered to take a polygraph test about Barry's death. A desperate Mulder tries to visit Senator Richard Matheson, only to be discouraged from doing so by his secretive informant, "X" (Steven Williams). In Krycek's car, Mulder finds spent cigarettes from the Smoking Man's meeting with Krycek. Realizing his role in Scully's abduction, Mulder submits a report to Skinner accusing Krycek of impeding his investigation and killing Barry. Skinner summons Krycek to his office, only to learn that he has disappeared. Skinner then announces to Mulder that he is officially re-opening the X-Files.

Mulder meets with Margaret in a park and tries to give her Scully's necklace. Margaret returns the necklace to Mulder, asking that he give it to Scully when he finds her. Margaret also says that she had the dream again about losing her daughter; Mulder takes this as a hopeful sign that Scully may still be alive. A mournful Mulder later returns to Skyland Mountain, to the field where Scully was abducted. Seemingly alone without her, he looks up into the stars.

== Production ==
The idea to have Scully abducted originated when Gillian Anderson became pregnant in the middle of the first season. While initially upset, those in charge of the show never considered dropping the actress from the show. Ideas such as having Scully give birth to an alien baby were dismissed. Ultimately, the writers decided to work around the pregnancy by closing the X-Files, separating the agents, and eventually having Scully be abducted. This permitted the producers to have an explanation for Scully's absence (she appears in only two scenes in "Ascension" and not at all in the next episode, "3"). Series creator Chris Carter commented that both the censors and the producers were reluctant on showing Scully in the trunk, but he "fought for that image" as he considered it conveyed the sense of danger to the character. Carter added the scenes of the experiment were meant to be ambiguous on whether Scully was abducted by aliens, the military, or both.

"Ascension" featured guest appearances from Steve Railsback, Nicholas Lea, Steven Williams and Sheila Larken. David Duchovny provided his own stunts in this episode, including being dangled in the aerial lift, shot in a single day at Grouse Mountain in North Vancouver, British Columbia. The backdrop for Barry's drive was done on a neighboring mountain, Mount Seymour. The tagline for this episode is "Deny Everything", replacing the usual phrase "The Truth is Out There."

== Broadcast and reception ==
"Ascension" premiered on the Fox network on October 21, 1994. The episode earned a Nielsen household rating of 9.6 with a 16 share, meaning that roughly 9.6 percent of all television-equipped households, and 16 percent of households watching TV, were tuned in to the episode. A total of 9.2 million households watched this episode during its original airing.

In a retrospective of the second season in Entertainment Weekly, the episode was rated an A, being described as "an expertly paced race against time". The handling of Anderson's pregnancy was called "creative", while the re-opening of the X-Files unit and the exposure of Krycek as a villainous character were noted as highlights. Writing for The A.V. Club, Zack Handlen called "Ascension" an "essential" episode, adding that it serves to "raise the stakes without losing the core of the show's appeal, and solve a technical problem in the most creatively satisfying way possible". Handlen also praised Nicholas Lea's portrayal of agent Alex Krycek, but felt that the character's role as a double agent was revealed too soon in the series. Critical Myth gave this episode 9/10, stating "[a]s convoluted and bastardized as that plot thread would become, at this stage of the game, it was one of the best episodes of the series to date."

== Bibliography ==
- Gradnitzer, Louisa; Pittson, Todd (1999). X Marks the Spot: On Location with The X-Files. Arsenal Pulp Press. ISBN 1-55152-066-4.
- Lovece, Frank (1996). The X-Files Declassified. Citadel Press. ISBN 0-8065-1745-X.
- Lowry, Brian (1995). The Truth is Out There: The Official Guide to the X-Files. Harper Prism. ISBN 0-06-105330-9.
