= Duane Barry =

- The X-Files episode
- Episode no.: Season 2 Episode 5
- Directed by: Chris Carter
- Written by: Chris Carter
- Cinematography by: John Bartley
- Production code: 2X05
- Original air date: October 14, 1994
- Running time: 45 minutes

Guest appearances
- Steve Railsback as Duane Barry; Nicholas Lea as Alex Krycek; Frank C. Turner as Dr. Hakkie; CCH Pounder as Lucy Kazdin

Episode chronology
← Previous "Sleepless"	Next → "Ascension"
- The X-Files season 2

"Duane Barry" is the fifth episode of the second season and 29th episode overall of the science fiction television series The X-Files, premiering in the United States and Canada on October 14, 1994. The episode was written and directed by executive producer Chris Carter. "Duane Barry" received a Nielsen rating of 8.9 and was viewed by 8.5 million households. The episode received largely positive reviews from critics.

The show centers on FBI special agents Fox Mulder (David Duchovny) and Dana Scully (Gillian Anderson) who work on cases linked to the paranormal, called X-Files. In the episode, Mulder becomes involved in a hostage situation with an escaped psychiatric patient, named Duane Barry (Steve Railsback), who claims to be terrified of frequent alien abductions.

The episode marked Carter's debut as a director. While never having directed before, he would go on to direct such episodes as "The List", "The Post-Modern Prometheus", "Triangle", and "Improbable", as well as the second feature film, The X-Files: I Want to Believe, and three episodes of the tenth season. The storyline was inspired by the true story of Phineas Gage, a 19th-century medical case.

== Plot ==
In 1985, at his home in Pulaski, Virginia, Duane Barry (Steve Railsback) is abducted by aliens. Nine years later, Barry has become a violent patient in a mental institution, refusing to take his medication and insisting that the aliens are coming back for him. He attacks a security guard and steals his gun, taking head psychiatrist Dr. Hakkie hostage before escaping. Barry seeks to return to his original abduction site with Dr. Hakkie, in the hopes that the aliens will take the doctor instead when they return. But since he can't remember where the abduction site is located, Barry heads to a travel agency in Richmond and holds the three clerks hostage along with Dr. Hakkie.

Fox Mulder (David Duchovny) and Alex Krycek (Nicholas Lea) are summoned to the ensuing hostage situation by Agent Lucy Kazdin (CCH Pounder), since Barry insists that he is an alien abductee. Mulder contacts Dana Scully (Gillian Anderson) for assistance, asking her to look into Barry's history. Mulder acts as a hostage negotiator, calling Barry in order to earn his trust so that the standoff may be peacefully resolved. Barry quickly figures this out, causing Mulder to learn that he is a former FBI agent. A power outage occurs, frightening Barry and causing him to fire his gun, hitting one of the hostages. Mulder heads inside the travel agency with a paramedic. Barry releases the wounded hostage in exchange for Mulder, who is instructed to get Barry near the agency's front door so that snipers can fire on him.

Scully arrives and reveals that Barry's frontal cortex was damaged when he was shot in the head in 1982; she thinks this injury has made Barry a psychopathic pathological liar. Mulder talks to Barry, who claims that the aliens performed painful tests on him and put tracking devices in his body. Against Kazdin's orders, Mulder tells Barry that he believes his story, convincing him to release the remaining hostages. However, when Mulder questions whether Barry is lying, he becomes enraged. Mulder tricks Barry into approaching the front door where he is shot by a sniper.

The next day, Mulder visits Barry in the hospital. Kazdin appears, revealing that metal implants were found in Barry's body and that tiny holes were found in his teeth, in the same manner he had described. Mulder gives one of the implants to Scully, who has it reviewed by a ballistics expert; they find a microscopic barcode imprinted on it. Later, at a supermarket, Scully swipes the implant across a checkout scanner, causing the machine to malfunction while displaying a strange serial number. At her house, Scully leaves a message on Mulder's voicemail, suggesting that Barry had been "catalogued" by the implant. But just then, Barry—having escaped from the hospital—breaks in through Scully's window and kidnaps her.

== Production ==
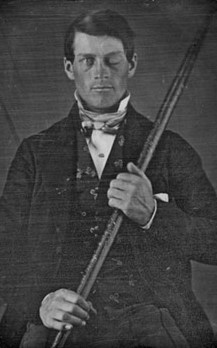
Part of the episode was inspired by the true story of Phineas Gage.

=== Conception ===
"Duane Barry" was originally planned to be a standalone mythology episode, but the news of Gillian Anderson's pregnancy led to the creation of a two-part episode, since the production crew knew they needed Anderson to disappear until she had given birth. The follow-up episode, "Ascension", was written by Paul Brown.

Much of Carter's inspiration for the episode came from reports of Phineas Gage, who underwent a personality change after a blasting accident drove an iron rod completely through his head The aliens' use of a dental drill on Barry was inspired by a neighbor of Carter who said that he was abducted and that the aliens drilled holes into his teeth, which a dentist analyzed and said could not be done with any equipment he knew.

The aliens seen at the start of the episode were portrayed by children. Carter wrote specifically the part of Barry with Steve Railsback in mind, saying, "I've resisted casting the marquee names only because it takes you out of the show; makes the show less believable. But there are certain actors who just call out for the part." Originally, Railsback character was named Duane Garry, but it was changed after learning that a person within the FBI had the same name. Carter has mentioned that he disliked the new name at first but got used to it over time.

=== Filming ===
"It was actually a good test of my skills. I kept communicating with directors for 30 episodes, telling them what I wanted. Now it was really a chance to show them what I wanted."

— Chris Carter on his directorial debut

This episode marked Carter's directing debut. Being the first he had ever directed, David Nutter from the directing staff helped, tipped, and showed him what to do. With Nutter's help, Carter learned how to block entire scenes. When commenting on his experience, Carter told that he sometimes followed Nutter's advice down to "the letter". When directing the episode, Carter wanted to create a different feel for the episode, by focusing more on the performances given by the actors, than the mechanical set designs. He declared that directing he learned about "things you take for granted as a writer and producer", that lead to "compromises" for things Carter could not do on-screen, and compared the episode to a stage play as most is set in a single place, the travel agency.

During the filming of Barry's abduction, they had a "film run out" which, according to Carter, gave the scene a "very eerie effect". Shooting that scene was a "real test" according to Carter. Carter was pleased with the outcome, saying he was able to show viewers what he wanted out of The X-Files, which he felt he was "very successful" at. The visual effects crew had to hang a "giant light" over the house where Barry was being abducted. It took the course of forty-five minutes to shoot the scene. According to Carter, much teamwork was required to film that particular scene. As he puts it, he was actually forced to stay "behind the camera" to see the end results. For the experiments, Railsback was put in a plaster model of his back as he was lifted by a hydraulic device, and had water squirted on his mouth for the dental drill.

== Reception ==
"Duane Barry" premiered on the Fox network on October 14, 1994. This episode earned a Nielsen rating of 8.9, with a 16 share, meaning that roughly 8.9 percent of all television-equipped households, and 16 percent of households watching television, were tuned in to the episode. It was viewed by 8.5 million households. CCH Pounder and Chris Carter both earned Primetime Emmy nominations for "excellence in primetime television" for their work in this episode. Pounder was nominated in the category "Outstanding Guest Actress in a Drama Series", while Carter was nominated in the category "Outstanding Individual Achievement in Writing for a Drama Series". The episode was also nominated in the categories "Outstanding Individual Achievement in Sound Editing for a Series" and "Outstanding Individual Achievement in Editing for a Series - Single Camera Production". Director of Photography John Bartley also received a nomination for Outstanding Achievement Award for Episodic Television by the American Society of Cinematographers.

The episode was well received by the cast and crew of The X-Files. Producer J.P. Finn praised the episode and Carter's directing, saying "We were all pretty nervous doing that one, because Chris Carter was a new director. It turned out that he directed very well...It was a great script, a great cast, and he ended up directing a home run. One of the charming things about it was the end, where we had these alien heads placed on young children. It was so endearing to see them on the set between takes, playing with Chris and everyone". Actor David Duchovny said of Carter's directing: "Chris came in meticulously prepared, which is his nature. I think his first episode was great". Carter himself described it as one of his favorite episodes because "it was a chance for me to sort of do it all, and it came out in ways better than I imagined it would".

The episode received largely positive reviews from television critics. Matt Roush from USA Today said Railsback's performance as Barry rivaled that of his portrayal of Charles Manson in the 1976 television miniseries Helter Skelter. An unnamed reviewer from the Contra Costa Times called the episode "seminal". San Jose Mercury News said Railsback gave what was to be the "ultimate X-Files performance" in 2002 after the show had been cancelled. Robert Shearman, in his book Wanting to Believe: A Critical Guide to The X-Files, Millennium & The Lone Gunmen, gave the episode a glowing review and rated it five stars out of five. Shearman called it "a career best for Chris Carter" and praised his writing and directing, noting that both were "powerfully" and "passionately" done. Shearman also applauded the episode's simplicity, citing it as the factor that made the entry stand out from others. Zack Handlen from The A.V. Club named it an "essential" episode of The X-Files. Furthermore, he praised Railsback's performance, writing that "there's a sweaty intensity to his best performances that makes him impossible to look away from; but you still can't accept anything he says at face value."

== Bibliography ==
- Edwards, Ted (1996). X-Files Confidential. Little, Brown and Company. ISBN 0-316-21808-1.
- Hurwitz, Matt; Knowles, Chris (2008). The Complete X-Files. Insight Editions. ISBN 978-1-933784-80-9.
- Lovece, Frank (1996). The X-Files Declassified. Citadel Press. ISBN 0-8065-1745-X.
- Lowry, Brian (1995). The Truth is Out There: The Official Guide to the X-Files. Harper Prism. ISBN 0-06-105330-9.
- Shearman, Robert (2009). Wanting to Believe: A Critical Guide to The X-Files, Millennium & The Lone Gunmen. Mad Norwegian Press. ISBN 978-0-9759446-9-1.
