= Sheila Larken =

American television actress (born 1944)

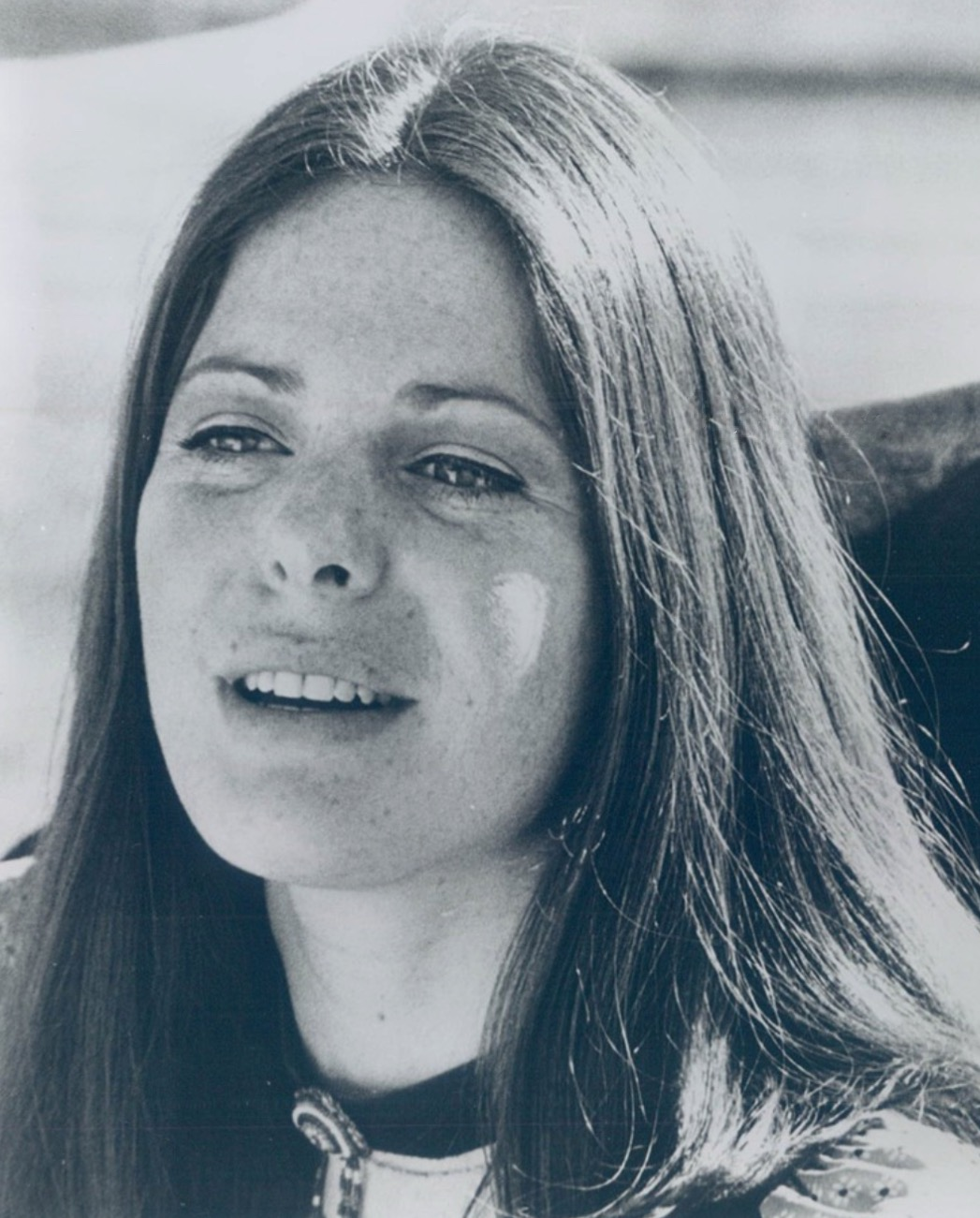
- Larken in Storefront Lawyers, 1971
- Born: February 24, 1944 (age 82); Brooklyn, New York City, New York, U.S.
- Years active: 1967–2016
- Known for: Margaret Scully on The X-Files
- Spouse: Robert W. Goodwin (m. 1978)
- Children: 2

Sheila Larken (born February 24, 1944) is an American television actress, best known for playing the role of Margaret Scully, the mother of Dana Scully, on The X-Files.

== Early life and career ==
Larken was born in Brooklyn, New York City and has appeared in such notable television series as Bonanza, The Virginian, Gunsmoke, Medical Center, Storefront Lawyers, Marcus Welby, M.D., Cagney & Lacey, Hawaii Five-O, It Takes a Thief, Barnaby Jones, Starsky and Hutch, Trapper John, M.D., Little House on the Prairie, Rawhide, The Incredible Hulk, Dallas, L.A. Law, Simon & Simon, and Cannon. She also appeared in "No Way Out," the final episode of the 1977 anthology series Quinn Martin's Tales of the Unexpected (known in the United Kingdom as Twist in the Tale). Her made-for-television movies include Attack on Terror: The FBI vs. the Ku Klux Klan (1975), Cave-In! (1983) and The Midnight Hour (1985).

== Personal life ==
Larken lives in Bellingham, Washington with her husband, television producer R.W. Goodwin whom she married in 1978 and their two children.
