= Shapes (The X-Files) =

- The X-Files episode
- Episode no.: Season 1 Episode 19
- Directed by: David Nutter
- Written by: Marilyn Osborn
- Production code: 1X18
- Original air date: April 1, 1994
- Running time: 45 minutes

Guest appearances
- Ty Miller as Lyle Parker; Michael Horse as Sheriff Charles Tskany; Donnelly Rhodes as Jim Parker; Jimmy Herman as Ish; Renae Morriseau as Gwen Goodensnake

Episode chronology
← Previous "Miracle Man"	Next → "Darkness Falls"
- The X-Files season 1

"Shapes" is the nineteenth episode of the first season of the American science fiction television series The X-Files, premiering on the Fox network on April 1, 1994. It was written by Marilyn Osborn and directed by David Nutter. It featured guest appearances by Michael Horse, Ty Miller and Donnelly Rhodes. The episode is a "Monster-of-the-Week" story, a stand-alone plot which is unconnected to the series' wider mythology. "Shapes" earned a Nielsen household rating of 7.6, being watched by 7.2 million households in its initial broadcast, and received mixed reviews, with varied reaction to the episode's handling of the werewolf genre and of its Native American themes.

The show centers on FBI agents Fox Mulder (David Duchovny) and Dana Scully (Gillian Anderson) who work on cases linked to the paranormal, called X-Files. In this episode, Mulder and Scully are called to Montana after a shooting on a farm near a Native American reservation. Investigating the case, the agents find that the dead man, and those that he attacked, may be capable of shapeshifting into ferocious beasts—a phenomenon which was documented in the first X-File.

"Shapes" was written after executives at Fox had suggested that the series should feature a "more conventional" type of monster, and producers James Wong and Glen Morgan began looking into Native American legends of the Manitou to form the basis of the episode's concept. Much of the episode was filmed in Maple Ridge and Pitt Meadows, British Columbia, Canada.

== Plot ==
FBI agents Dana Scully and Fox Mulder travel to Browning, Montana, to investigate the killing of a Native American man, Joseph Goodensnake, by local rancher Jim Parker. The killing appears to be motivated by a dispute over the ownership of a tract of land, although Parker claims that he fired on a monstrous animal rather than a human. Parker's son, Lyle, bears scars that lend credence to the story.

At the scene of the shooting, Scully reasons that at the short range from which Goodensnake was shot, it would have been impossible to mistake him for an animal. However, Mulder finds tracks leading to the area that appear to change from human to something more animal in nature. Scully dismisses this but finds a large section of shed human skin nearby. She believes that the Parkers knowingly killed Goodensnake, but knows that they could not have skinned him since no signs of such injury were found on the body.

The investigation is complicated by the hostility Mulder and Scully face from the Native American population, stemming from their experience with the FBI during the 1973 Wounded Knee incident. Goodensnake's sister Gwen is also bitter that her neighbors are too frightened of native legends to confront his death. The local sheriff, Charles Tskany, permits Scully to make a cursory examination of Goodensnake's body but forbids a full autopsy. They discover that he had elongated canines, similar to those of an animal, and bears long-healed scars similar to Lyle's.

Mulder tells Scully of a similar incident in the area forty years previously, which was investigated by J. Edgar Hoover and became the FBI's first X-File case. As the agents watch Goodensnake's body being cremated in a traditional ceremony, Mulder shares with Scully his belief that the culprits in both the current case and Hoover's investigation are werewolves. Scully dismisses this theory and instead credits the belief to clinical lycanthropy. Parker is subsequently ripped apart by an unseen animal outside his home, and Lyle is found naked and unconscious a few hundred yards away.

Ish, one of the elders of the reservation, explains to Mulder the legend of the manitou, a shape-shifter that can pass to a new host, through a bite or upon the death of the original host. Ish believes he had seen the creature in his youth but was too frightened to confront it. He says it happens every eight years to someone in the region, and that it has been that long since the last sighting of a possible manitou.

Mulder calls the medical examiner, who tells him that Scully has taken Lyle back to the ranch, and Parker's blood type was found in Lyle's stomach. Mulder and Tskany hurry to the ranch. After firing on the creature, which escapes unharmed, Mulder finds Scully hiding upstairs. They search for the creature, which is shot by Tskany as it lunges to attack them. Scully expresses disbelief on seeing Lyle's body, believing they were attacked by a captive cougar; Tskany replies that the cougar is still in its cage. As the agents leave, they learn that Gwen has left town, while Ish cryptically warns Mulder, "FBI... See you in about... eight years". As Mulder and Scully drive away, a wolf is heard howling in the forest.

== Production ==
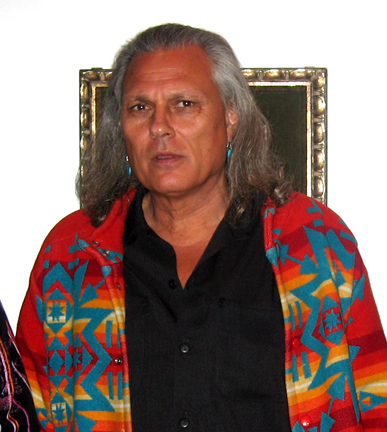
Michael Horse, who played Sheriff Tskany in the episode, had previously appeared with series lead David Duchovny in Twin Peaks.

"Shapes" was written after executives at the Fox network had suggested that the series should feature a "more conventional" type of monster, and producers James Wong and Glen Morgan began looking into Native American legends of the Manitou to form the basis of the episode's concept, believing that "a horror show should be able to do these legends that have been around since the thirteen hundreds". The episode made mention of the first X-File case to have been opened, apparently initiated by J. Edgar Hoover in 1946, while it also references the events of the earlier first-season episode "Beyond the Sea", as Scully is seen discussing her father's death. "Shapes" marked the first time an episode of The X-Files had made use of Native American themes and folklore. While this episode was a stand-alone "Monster-of-the-Week" story, later episodes beginning with the second-season finale "Anasazi", would begin to incorporate Navajo cultural references into the show's overarching mythology.

Guest star Michael Horse, who plays Sheriff Charles Tskany, is the third guest star of the series to have previously appeared alongside Duchonvy in the ABC mystery serial drama television series Twin Peaks. Previous Twin Peaks alumni who had appeared on The X-Files at this point in its run included Claire Stansfield (who played the Jersey Devil in the episode of the same name) and Don Davis (who portrayed Agent Scully's father, William, in the episodes "Beyond the Sea"). Future episodes of The X-Files would guest star several other Twin Peaks actors, including Jan D'Arcy (who would appear in the subsequent first-season episode "Tooms"), Michael J. Anderson (who would appear in the season two's "Humbug"), Frances Bay (who would appear in the season two's "Excelsis Dei"), Kenneth Welsh (who would appear in the season three's "Revelations"), Richard Beymer (who would appear in season four's "Sanguinarium"), and Robyn Lively (who would appear in the season six's "Field Trip").

Much of the episode was filmed in Maple Ridge and Pitt Meadows, British Columbia, Canada, on a site named Bordertown—a "classic western" town that had been built specifically for film sets, located just a "ten-minute drive" from first assistant director Tom Braidwood's home. The area was chosen as it provided locations for the exterior shots of the reservation, plus all of the interior areas that were needed for the episode. Despite covering the area in gravel, heavy rains left the ground sodden and muddy enough to bog down equipment and vehicles. Similar weather conditions would hinder the filming of the next episode, "Darkness Falls". The funeral pyre scene was lit mostly using the natural light of the bonfire used, while the extras who sang and prayed were cast by director David Nutter after a visit to a weekly meeting of Native Americans in Vancouver, who felt that casting non-professionals would lend the scene more authenticity.

== Broadcast and reception ==
"Shapes" premiered on the Fox network on April 1, 1994. The episode earned a Nielsen household rating of 7.6 with a 14 share, meaning that roughly 7.6 percent of all television-equipped households, and 14 percent of households watching TV, were tuned in to the episode. A total of 7.2 million households watched this episode during its original airing.

In a retrospective of the first season in Entertainment Weekly, the episode was rated a D+, being described as having a "garden-variety werewolf plot" that offered "nothing much to sink your teeth into". Zack Handlen, writing for The A.V. Club, described the episode as "thoroughly predictable". He found the plot to be unoriginal, believing that it existed "more out of a sense of tradition than any real desire to tell a specific story"; however, he praised the acting in the episode, especially that of guest star Michael Horse. Matt Haigh, writing for Den of Geek, described "Shapes" as being "a very basic and slightly drawn-out werewolf and detective story", though overall finding that the episode's visual effects and atmosphere meant that it "mostly comes out good in the end". "Shapes" has been criticized for seeming like a "werewolf tale with Native American trappings", with its attempts at political correctness being seen as forced. However, it was praised for not adhering to the "noble savage" archetype in its portrayal of the Native American characters. Jane Goldman, in The X-Files Book of the Unexplained, feels that the episode seriously misrepresents the folklore it portrays, noting that "for many natives, calling a crazed, man-eating beast 'Manitou' is like calling Charles Manson 'God'". The plot for "Shapes" was also adapted as a novel for young adults in 1996 by Ellen Steiber.

== See also ==
- Wendigo
- Shape shifter

== Footnotes ==
=== References ===
- Cantor, Paul A (2003). Gilligan Unbound: Pop Culture in the Age of Globalization. Rowman & Littlefield. ISBN 0-7425-0779-3.
- Gradnitzer, Louisa; Pittson, Todd (1999). X Marks the Spot: On Location with The X-Files. Arsenal Pulp Press. ISBN 1-55152-066-4.
- Goldman, Jane (1997). The X-Files Book of the Unexplained. Simon & Schuster. ISBN 0-684-81962-7.
- Gwenllian-Jones, Sara; Pearson, Roberta E. (2004). Cult television. University of Minnesota Press. ISBN 0-8166-3831-4.
- Lavery, David; Hague, Angela; Cartwright, Marla (1996). Deny All Knowledge: Reading The X-Files. Syracuse University Press. ISBN 0-8156-2717-3.
- Lowry, Brian (1995). The Truth is Out There: The Official Guide to the X-Files. Harper Prism. ISBN 0-06-105330-9.
