= Born Again (The X-Files) =

- The X-Files episode
- A fish-tank ornament visible in the static of a video recording
- Episode no.: Season 1 Episode 22
- Directed by: Jerrold Freedman
- Written by: Alex Gansa; Howard Gordon
- Production code: 1X21
- Original air date: April 29, 1994
- Running time: 44 minutes

Guest appearances
- Brian Markinson as Tony Fiore; Mimi Lieber as Anita Fiore; Maggie Wheeler as Detective Sharon Lazard; Dey Young as Judy Bishop; Andrea Libman as Michelle Bishop; P. Lynn Johnson as Dr. Shiela Braun; Dwight Koss as Detective Barbala; Matthew John Dyson

Episode chronology
← Previous "Tooms"	Next → "Roland"
- The X-Files season 1

"Born Again" is the twenty-second episode of the first season of the American science fiction television series The X-Files, premiering on the Fox network on April 29, 1994. It was written by Howard Gordon and Alex Gansa, and directed by Jerrold Freedman. The episode featured guest appearances by Brian Markinson and Maggie Wheeler. The episode is a "Monster-of-the-Week" story, a stand-alone plot which is unconnected to the series' wider mythology.

The show centers on FBI agents Fox Mulder (David Duchovny) and Dana Scully (Gillian Anderson) who work on cases linked to the paranormal, called X-Files. When Mulder and Scully are called to New York State to investigate the death of a police officer, they come to believe that a young girl present during the incident may be the reincarnation of another officer murdered years earlier.

"Born Again" earned a Nielsen household rating of 8.2, being watched by 7.7 million households in its initial broadcast, and received mixed reviews from critics. Additionally, several crew members disliked the episode, most notably Gordon and Duchovny. Gordon felt that the episode was too similar to the other episodes that had been aired, whereas Duchovny bluntly stated that he "detested" the episode.

== Plot ==
In Buffalo, New York, police detective Sharon Lazard finds a little girl, Michelle Bishop, alone in an alley. Lazard takes the seemingly lost girl into her precinct and leaves her alone to be interviewed by another detective, Rudolph Barbala. However, moments later, Barbala is launched through a window, falling to his death.

Lazard turns to FBI agents Fox Mulder and Dana Scully for help. She tells them of Michelle's claims that a man had attacked Barbala, even though she was the only person in the room when the detective was killed. The agents have Michelle describe the alleged attacker for a computerized facial composite; the computer seemingly glitches, displaying a face that Michelle identifies as the killer. The composite matches that of a Detective Charlie Morris — who died nine years previously in an apparent gangland hit. Mulder speaks to Michelle's psychiatrist, Dr. Braun, who tells him that she habitually mutilated dolls in a uniform manner during their sessions together, removing the same eye and arm each time; Mulder realizes that these mutilations match the circumstances of Morris' death.

The agents interview Tony Fiore, Morris' ex-partner, who attributes his death to a triad gang they had been investigating together. Later that day, Fiore meets with a Leon Felder to discuss claiming a large sum of money from a safety deposit box. The two men agree that they haven't waited the ten years they had intended to, ominously discussing that they are the last two claimants left. That night, Felder gets off a bus, but his scarf catches in the door, seemingly moved by an invisible force, as the bus drives off. The driver tries to brake, but the bus inexplicably continues to accelerate, strangling Felder. Michelle watches from inside the bus.

Investigating further, Mulder and Scully learn that Fiore, Barbala, Felder and Morris had all worked closely together in the past. They also find that Fiore's wife Anita keeps a collection of origami animals made by her first husband—Charlie Morris. Anita tells the agents that Fiore hasn't returned home from the previous night; meanwhile, the agents find that pages are missing from the file on Morris' murder, and Fiore was the last one to have checked the file out.

Michelle undergoes a session of regression hypnosis, where she claims to be twenty-four years old. She suddenly starts screaming in panic about someone trying to kill her, and the session is ended. Mulder reviews the video of the session and is convinced that the girl is the reincarnation of Morris, having been conceived right around the time the detective was murdered. The tape contains a brief section of static noise just before Michelle begins screaming, which Mulder has an expert clean up. The noise is found to contain a grainy image of what appears to be a fish tank ornament of a man in a diving suit. Meanwhile, Scully has tracked down Morris' autopsy findings, which show the presence of salt water in his respiratory tract, indicating he died of drowning. The agents realize from these findings that Morris was drowned in the exotic fish tank in Fiore's house.

Rushing to Fiore's house, Mulder and Scully find Michelle using telekinetic powers to try to kill Fiore. They prevent her from doing so, and Fiore confesses that he, Felder and Barbala had stolen a large sum of money, intending to keep it safe for ten years before claiming it. Morris learned of their plan and threatened to report on them, and was consequently killed to silence him. However, Fiore maintains that he never wanted to see Morris dead and only wanted to take care of Anita after his death. Michelle uses her powers to destroy the fish tank, but spares Fiore after hearing pleas from Anita not to hurt him. Later, Fiore pleads guilty to charges of murder and grand larceny, whilst Michelle seemingly recovers and goes on to become a normal little girl.

== Production ==
"I thought the direction was a little sloppy, but it's one of those episodes that plays a little closer to reality and I like that about it, There's a nice twist in it about a man marrying the wife of another man he had killed. There were actually some nice effects. Just not one of my favorites."

— Chris Carter on "Born Again"

Writer Howard Gordon has expressed his disappointment with the episode, feeling that it was too similar to his earlier work on the episode "Shadows" and finding that it was "not done particularly interestingly". Series creator Chris Carter also felt that "Born Again" was "just not one of [his] favorites", adding that he "thought the direction was a little sloppy, but it's one of those episodes that plays a little closer to reality and I like that about it". David Duchovny reportedly "detested" the episode, despite a guest appearance by his friend and ex-girlfriend, Maggie Wheeler.

Executive producer R. W. Goodwin recalls being on location for the episode's opening scene, in which Detective Barbala is thrown from a window. The room used for the scene had two windows side by side, and one had been replaced with sugar glass for the stunt. When the false window was blown out to simulate someone being thrown through it, the crew found that the glass window beside the false one had also accidentally been blown out. The episode's key grip, Al Campbell, suggested that the next shot show Barbala's dog lying beside his body to explain the second window breaking.

== Broadcast and reception ==
"Born Again" premiered on the Fox network on April 22, 1994. This episode earned a Nielsen household rating of 8.2, with a 14 share, meaning that in the US, roughly 8.2 percent of all television-equipped households, and 14 percent of households watching television, were tuned in to the episode. It was viewed by 7.7 million households.

In a retrospective of the first season in Entertainment Weekly, "Born Again" was rated a B−, with the episode being described as "engaging but ultimately just serviceable", although Andrea Libman's casting as Michelle was called "inspired". Zack Handlen, writing for The A.V. Club, felt negatively towards the episode, feeling that its plot was too reminiscent of earlier episodes, such as "Eve" or "Shadows". However, he found the scene in which an image is found in the static of a video recording to have been a highlight, calling it "a cool combination of hard science and the inexplicable". Matt Haigh, writing for Den of Geek, was favorable towards the episode, again praising the performance of Libman as Michelle. He also drew comparisons to "Shadows", but felt that "Born Again" was the better episode of the two.

== Footnotes ==
=== References ===
- Edwards, Ted (1996). X-Files Confidential. Little, Brown and Company. ISBN 0-316-21808-1.
- Lovece, Frank (1996). The X-Files Declassified. Citadel Press. ISBN 0-8065-1745-X.
- Lowry, Brian (1995). The Truth is Out There: The Official Guide to the X-Files. Harper Prism. ISBN 0-06-105330-9.
