= Eve (The X-Files) =

- The X-Files episode
- Episode no.: Season 1 Episode 11
- Directed by: Fred Gerber
- Written by: Kenneth Biller; Chris Brancato
- Production code: 1X10
- Original air date: December 10, 1993
- Running time: 45 minutes

Guest appearances
- Harriet Harris as Dr. Sally Kendrick/Eve 7, Eve 6, Eve 8; Erika Krievins as Cindy Reardon/Eve 10; Sabrina Krievins as Teena Simmons/Eve 9; Jerry Hardin as Deep Throat; George Touliatos as Dr. Katz

Episode chronology
← Previous "Fallen Angel"	Next → "Fire"
- The X-Files season 1

"Eve" is the eleventh episode of the American science fiction television series The X-Files, premiering on the Fox network on December 10, 1993. It was written by Kenneth Biller and Chris Brancato, directed by Fred Gerber, and featured guest appearances by Harriet Sansom Harris and Jerry Hardin in his role as Deep Throat. The episode is a "Monster-of-the-Week" story, unconnected to the series' wider mythology. "Eve" earned a Nielsen household rating of 6.8 and was watched by 6.4 million households in its initial broadcast. It received positive reviews from critics.

The show centers on FBI agents Fox Mulder (David Duchovny) and Dana Scully (Gillian Anderson) who work on cases linked to the paranormal, called X-Files. When Mulder and Scully investigate two seemingly identical murders that occurred simultaneously thousands of miles apart, they find that both victims' daughters may be the product of a secret human cloning project created by the government.

The episode was pitched to series creator Chris Carter by freelance writers Biller and Brancato under the title of "The Girls from Greenwich", with the focus being on genetic experiments conducted on sets of twins. The producers initially looked for twins to play the roles of Teena and Cindy in Los Angeles, but child labor laws made using children from there so difficult that they instead searched locally in Vancouver, finding Erika and Sabrina Krievins.

== Plot ==
In Greenwich, Connecticut, a jogging couple find their neighbor, a young girl named Teena Simmons, standing alone in her driveway. After she explains her father is in the yard, the couple find him sitting dead on a swing set with two incisions in his neck. When FBI agents Fox Mulder and Dana Scully take the case, Mulder explains that he believes the death is an example of extraterrestrial cattle mutilation on a human being. The agents meet Teena, who claims to have seen "red lightning" when her father died and that "men from the clouds" had wanted to "exsanguinate him."

Leaving Teena in the state's care, the agents travel to Marin County, California, where a similar death has occurred at the Reardon residence. Mulder and Scully realize that, despite thousands of miles lying between the two crime scenes, the killings were committed on the same day and at the same moment. Meanwhile, back in Connecticut, Teena is kidnapped by a dark-clothed figure.

When Mulder and Scully meet Mrs. Reardon and her daughter, Cindy, they discover that Cindy is completely identical to Teena. Cindy's mother tells the agents that her daughter was conceived via in vitro fertilization at a fertility clinic in San Francisco. There, Scully learns that both the Simmonses and the Reardons were treated by Dr. Sally Kendrick, who was eventually fired for conducting eugenics experiments with ova from the clinic's lab. Meanwhile, Mulder is contacted by Deep Throat, who details a Cold War-era supersoldier program that produced genetically modified clones who were identified as "Adam" or "Eve" based on their sex. Deep Throat tells Mulder of a woman connected with the project who is currently kept in a mental hospital.

Mulder and Scully travel to the hospital and meet "Eve 6", who bears an identical resemblance to Sally Kendrick. Eve 6 tells them that the Adam and Eve clones created for the program had extra chromosomes which led them to display superhuman intelligence and strength, as well as extreme homicidal psychoses. The last three Eve clones—Eves 6, 7, and 8—were institutionalized after the project was cancelled. However, Eve 7 escaped and later joined the fertility clinic as "Sally Kendrick", modifying the ova of the clinic's patients to create new Eve clones. Eve 8, who also escaped, is still at large.

Though Mulder and Scully place Cindy's house under surveillance, they're unable to prevent one of the escaped Eves from abducting Cindy. The Eve takes Cindy to a motel where Teena is already being held captive and introduces the two girls to each other. The woman reveals herself to be Eve 7/Sally Kendrick and explains that she cloned the girls using her own genetic material to improve upon the original program's flaws, only to learn about the girls' "accelerated development" after they murdered their fathers. She asks the girls how they learned of each other's existence and how they planned the murders, to which they reply that they "just knew." The girls poison Eve 7's drink with a fatal dose of foxglove.

Mulder and Scully arrive at the motel, only to find Eve 7 dead. The girls claim that both Eve 7 and Eve 8 were trying to goad them into a mass suicide. The agents decide to take the girls with them as they leave the scene. That night, the group arrives at a roadside truck stop and order drinks at the diner. One of the girls, however, discreetly poisons the sodas the agents ordered with foxglove. After finding odd stains on the diner counter, Mulder realizes the girls' plan and manages to keep Scully from drinking more of her soda. The agents then pursue the girls through the truck stop, with Mulder eventually capturing them.

Teena and Cindy, now known as "Eve 9" and "Eve 10," end up in the same psychiatric ward as Eve 6. Eventually, a woman wearing a lab coat—and immediately recognized by Cindy and Teena as Eve 8—comes to the ward. When Eve 8 asks the girls how they knew she would come for them, the girls again respond: "We just knew."

== Production ==
Freelance writers Kenneth Biller and Chris Brancato pitched the idea for this episode to series creator Chris Carter under the title of "The Girls from Greenwich", with the focus being on genetic experiments conducted on sets of twins. Brancato said the duo decided to do "an X-File with a genetics experiment gone awry" inspired by the film The Boys from Brazil (1978), where Nazi scientists create clones of Adolf Hitler, while finding "our own themes and characterizations to explore", such as commenting on the human condition similarly to The Twilight Zone. The characters of Teena and Cindy were named after the wives of Glen Morgan and James Wong, who rewrote the original script prior to filming. "Eve" was the only episode of The X-Files to be directed by Fred Gerber, who Carter felt "brought some interesting stuff to it".

The producers initially looked for twins to play the roles of Teena and Cindy in Los Angeles, but child labor laws made using children from there so difficult that they instead searched locally in Vancouver, finding Erika and Sabrina Krievins. The difficulty in finding suitable actors for the roles had led producer R. W. Goodwin to consider casting one actor in both roles and using special effects and body doubles to create the impression of twins; however, this idea was rejected as it would have proved too impractical and expensive. The scenes in the episode set in the roadside diner were filmed in a café in White Rock, British Columbia, whose large gravel car park helped it appear "very rural in its setting". A large awning was used to complement the exterior shots of the building.

== Reception ==
=== Ratings ===
"Eve" premiered on the Fox network on December 10, 1993. This episode earned a Nielsen rating of 6.8, with a 12 share, meaning that roughly 6.8 percent of all television-equipped households, and 12 percent of households watching television, were tuned in to the episode. It was viewed by 6.4 million households.

=== Reviews ===
The episode received mostly positive reviews from critics. In a retrospective of the first season in Entertainment Weekly, "Eve" was rated a B+, with the episode being called "tidy, satisfying, and suspenseful". The episode's premise and the casting of Harris were both cited as highlights. Keith Phipps, writing for The A.V. Club, also rated the episode a B+, calling it "a nicely realized episode" that "does a nice job building slowly and offering some shocks along the way". The acting and tone were also praised, especially the "dead-eyed performances" of the Krievins twins. Matt Haigh, writing for Den of Geek, felt that the episode had "a good, original story" that proved "you can't go wrong when it comes to twins and horror"; with the girls' acting being called "suitably menacing". Jessica Morgan of Television Without Pity gave the episode an A grade. Series creator Chris Carter stated he liked the casting of the episode, calling Harriet Harris' performance excellent. He also praised the performance of Erika and Sabrina Krievins, stating "those two little girls were so wonderfully understated and creepy". The band Eve 6 took its name from this episode, as a band member Tony Fagenson was a fan. The plot for "Eve" was also adapted as a novel for young adults in 1997 by Ellen Steiber.

== Footnotes ==
=== References ===
- Edwards, Ted (1996). X-Files Confidential. Little, Brown and Company. ISBN 0-316-21808-1.
- Gradnitzer, Louisa; Pittson, Todd (1999). X Marks the Spot: On Location with The X-Files. Arsenal Pulp Press. ISBN 1-55152-066-4.
- Hurwitz, Matt; Knowles, Chris (2008). The Complete X-Files. Insight Editions. ISBN 978-1-933784-80-9.
- Lovece, Frank (1996). The X-Files Declassified. Citadel Press. ISBN 0-8065-1745-X.
- Lowry, Brian (1995). The Truth is Out There: The Official Guide to the X-Files. Harper Prism. ISBN 0-06-105330-9.

== See also ==
- The Midwich Cuckoos, a novel by John Wyndham, where children have supernatural powers
