= The Jersey Devil (The X-Files) =

- The X-Files episode
- Episode no.: Season 1 Episode 5
- Directed by: Joe Napolitano
- Written by: Chris Carter
- Production code: 1X04
- Original air date: October 8, 1993
- Running time: 44 minutes

Guest appearances
- Claire Stansfield as the Jersey Devil; Wayne Tippit as Detective Thompson; Gregory Sierra as Dr. Diamond; Michael MacRae as Ranger Peter Boulle

Episode chronology
← Previous "Conduit"	Next → "Shadows"
- The X-Files season 1

"The Jersey Devil" is the fifth episode of the first season of the American science fiction television series The X-Files, premiering on the Fox Network on October 8, 1993. It was written by series creator Chris Carter, directed by Joe Napolitano and featured guest appearances by Gregory Sierra, Wayne Tippit and Claire Stansfield. Although the episode is the series' second "Monster-of-the-Week" story—after the earlier "Squeeze"—it was the first to have been written by Carter.

The show centers on FBI agents Fox Mulder (David Duchovny) and Dana Scully (Gillian Anderson) who work on cases linked to the paranormal, called X-Files. In this episode, Mulder and Scully investigate seemingly cannibalistic murders in New Jersey. The two later come across what seems to be an evolutionary relict which may have inspired tales of the Jersey Devil.

Carter was inspired to write "The Jersey Devil" after reading an essay by E. O. Wilson regarding ants; Carter, in turn, wrote a story that posed whether mankind was hellbent on its own extinction. The concept of mankind being carnivores and eating its own tail evolved into the idea of using an evolutionary mutation that was a throwback to the Neanderthal. The purpose of the scenes with Scully going on a date were to show the life she was passing up to work on the X-Files and to open up Scully to the audience.

== Plot ==
In 1947, a motorist is attacked while fixing a flat tire near the Pine Barrens in New Jersey. His corpse is later found with its leg chewed off, and a hairy humanoid is killed nearby.

In present-day Washington D.C., Dana Scully (Gillian Anderson) brings to Fox Mulder's (David Duchovny) attention news about a body found in New Jersey with its arm and shoulder missing. Upon arriving at the Atlantic City morgue, they discover that the body was seemingly eaten by a human. However, the local detective, Thompson, denies the agents access to the investigation. Scully returns to Washington to attend her godson's birthday party while Mulder stays in New Jersey. At the party, Scully meets Rob, the divorced father of one of the guests. Meanwhile, a homeless man shows Mulder a drawing of a humanoid creature which he and other homeless people have seen and which the police are aware of. Mulder gives his hotel room key to the man and sleeps in the alley, where he sees a shadowy, human-like creature. He chases the creature but is arrested before he can catch it.

The next morning, Mulder calls Scully to post his bail. Afterwards, Scully brings Mulder to meet with Dr. Diamond, a professor of anthropology at the University of Maryland, before going on a date with Rob. Peter Boulle, a local park ranger, contacts Mulder after finding the corpse of a wild man in the woods who he believes could be the Jersey Devil. The agents bring Boulle and Diamond to the morgue, where the body has mysteriously vanished. Mulder believes that the Jersey Devil they are hunting is actually the creature's mate, who has come to Atlantic City in search of food after her mate's death. The agents, along with Boulle and Diamond, search for the creature in an abandoned building. As they do so, Detective Thompson arrives with a SWAT team.

Mulder spots the creature and chases after her. He is attacked by the creature, which wounds him before Scully scares her away. The creature then escapes into the woods. Scully, Mulder, Diamond and Boulle manage to find the creature, which again escapes after being shot with a tranquilizer dart. However, the SWAT team soon finds and kills her. Mulder asks Thompson why he killed the creature; he responds that it is the same reason one would kill a rabid animal. The autopsy reveals no prehistoric bone structure, although human bones are located within her digestive tract. The autopsies of the male and female creatures also reveals that they likely had children. Mulder leaves to talk to an ethnobiologist at the Smithsonian; Scully turns down a second date with Rob to join him. Meanwhile, in the woods, the child of the creatures appears, watching a father and son hiking.

== Production ==
Writer and series creator Chris Carter decided that rather than trying to present a typical Bigfoot-like creature, he would present the Jersey Devil as a missing link. Carter was inspired to write the episode by an essay by E. O. Wilson regarding ants and a story he wrote that posed whether mankind was hellbent on its own extinction. The concept of mankind being carnivores and eating its own tail evolved into the idea of using an evolutionary mutation that was a throwback to the Neanderthal. A Greg Cannom werewolf outfit from a previous project was used for the costume of the creature.

The purpose of the scenes with Scully going on a date were to show the life she was passing on to work on the X-Files and to open up Scully to the audience. Carter explained that he "tried to develop a love interest for Scully only to heighten the sexual tension between her and Mulder." The scenes with Mulder in Atlantic City were shot against a blue screen in Vancouver, with stock casino footage added in post-production.

During filming, Claire Stansfield, who played the titular creature, was intended to appear nude, necessitating several solutions to be found for different scenes—some were shot with the actress wearing a nude-colored outfit, while others were shot with her hair tied in such a manner as to keep her breasts covered. Several scenes for the episode were filmed in a Vancouver mansion, which served as an office, townhouse and restaurant. This same mansion was used for exterior shots in the later first season episode "Fire." The forest scenes were filmed in a remote area accessible only by large trucks, while all of the exterior city scenes were filmed in and around a sheet metal store.

Stansfield was the first X-Files guest star to have previously appeared in the ABC mystery serial drama series Twin Peaks. Future X-Files guest stars who had also appeared in Twin Peaks included Don Davis (who portrayed Agent Scully's father, William, in the first-season episode "Beyond the Sea" and the second-season episode "One Breath"), Jan D'Arcy (who would appear in the first-season episode "Tooms"), Michael J. Anderson (who would appear in the season two's "Humbug"), Frances Bay (who would appear in the season two's "Excelsis Dei"), Kenneth Welsh (who would appear in the season three's "Revelations"), Richard Beymer (who would appear in season four's "Sanguinarium") and Robyn Lively (who would appear in the season six's "Field Trip").

== Broadcast and reception ==
"The Jersey Devil" premiered on the Fox network on October 8, 1993. The episode earned a Nielsen household rating of 6.6 with a 12 share—meaning that in the US, 6.6 percent of television-equipped households, and 12 percent of all households actively watching television, were watching the program. It was viewed by 6.2 million households.

In a retrospective of the first season in Entertainment Weekly, "The Jersey Devil" was rated a C, with the episode being called "corny," and full of "needless philosophizing"; it was noted however that the sub-plot concerning Scully's private life set the stage for the series' future. Keith Phipps, writing for The A.V. Club, had mixed feeling about the episode, rating it a C. He felt that the scenes featuring Scully's private life and Mulder speaking to a group of homeless people were effectively done, although the episode overall was "pretty silly" and took "a decent idea to a dead end." Producer James Wong was critical of the episode, feeling that it "ran out of steam in the middle. It didn't go anywhere; there weren't enough complications to it," though he added that it had been "beautifully shot."

== Footnotes ==
=== References ===
- Edwards, Ted (1996). X-Files Confidential. Little, Brown and Company. ISBN 0-316-21808-1.
- Gradnitzer, Louisa; Pittson, Todd (1999). X Marks the Spot: On Location with The X-Files. Arsenal Pulp Press. ISBN 1-55152-066-4.
- Lavery, David; Hague, Angela; Cartwright, Marla (1996). Deny All Knowledge: Reading The X-Files. Syracuse University Press. ISBN 0-8156-2717-3.
- Lovece, Frank (1996). The X-Files Declassified. Citadel Press. ISBN 0-8065-1745-X.
- Lowry, Brian (1995). The Truth is Out There: The Official Guide to the X-Files. Harper Prism. ISBN 0-06-105330-9.
