= Ghost in the Machine (The X-Files) =

- The X-Files episode
- Episode no.: Season 1 Episode 7
- Directed by: Jerrold Freedman
- Written by: Alex Gansa; Howard Gordon
- Production code: 1X06
- Original air date: October 29, 1993
- Running time: 45 minutes

Guest appearances
- Jerry Hardin as Deep Throat; Rob LaBelle as Brad Wilczek; Wayne Duvall as Jerry Lamana; Blu Mankuma as Claude Peterson

Episode chronology
← Previous "Shadows"	Next → "Ice"
- The X-Files season 1

"Ghost in the Machine" is the seventh episode of the first season of the American science fiction television series The X-Files, premiering on the Fox network on October 29, 1993. It was written by Howard Gordon and Alex Gansa, and directed by Jerrold Freedman. The episode featured guest appearances by Wayne Duvall and Rob LaBelle, and saw Jerry Hardin reprise his role as Deep Throat for the first time since the character's introduction. The episode is a "Monster-of-the-Week" story, unconnected to the series' wider mythology. "Ghost in the Machine" earned a Nielsen household rating of 5.9, being watched by 5.6 million households in its initial broadcast, and received mixed reviews from critics.

The show centers on FBI agents Fox Mulder (David Duchovny) and Dana Scully (Gillian Anderson) who work on cases linked to the paranormal, called X-Files. In this episode, Mulder is asked by his old partner from the Behavioral Analysis Unit to aid an investigation into a murder at a software company. Soon, he and Dana Scully (Gillian Anderson) uncover a malevolent artificial intelligence which has started killing to protect itself.

Writers Gordon and Gansa have admitted they were "not computer literate" and felt this was a detriment to their writing. The scenes set at the software company Eurisko were filmed at the Metrotower complex in Burnaby, British Columbia, Canada, a building used by the Canadian Security Intelligence Service. The location was barely big enough for the actors to perform in after the crew had finished setting up the necessary equipment. Mulder and Scully would once again face a malevolent AI in the William Gibson-penned fifth season episode "Kill Switch".

== Plot ==
In the Crystal City, Virginia, headquarters of the software company Eurisko, founder Brad Wilczek and chief executive officer Benjamin Drake argue about downsizing measures. After Wilczek leaves, Drake writes a memo proposing to shut down the Central Operating System (COS), a computer which runs the Eurisko Building. Seeing this through a surveillance camera, the COS sets up a trap and lures Drake into a bathroom, locking the door behind him. Drake tries to use his keycard to open it, but it rejects the card. When he inserts a manual override key, he is fatally electrocuted.

FBI Agent Jerry Lamana, Fox Mulder's former partner in the Behavioral Analysis Unit, approaches him and Dana Scully for help in investigating Drake's murder. On their way up to Drake's office, the agents' elevator stalls, causing Scully to call the front desk for help; as she identifies herself, the COS records her contact information before reactivating the elevator. While examining the crime scene, the agents meet Claude Peterson, the Eurisko Building's systems engineer. Later, Lamana steals Mulder's profile of the supposed killer and presents it under his name; an outraged Mulder confronts him afterwards.

Mulder and Scully question Wilczek, who denies any involvement in the murder. Scully initially doubts Wilczek's involvement but finds that his voice matches a speaking clock Drake received before his death; Lamana sets out to arrest him. Meanwhile, Wilczek fails to access the COS from his home computer. Concerned, he travels to the Eurisko Building, followed by Lamana. There, he is still unable to access the COS, but discovers that it has learned to talk. Lamana arrives but is killed when the COS causes his elevator to crash.

Mulder meets with Deep Throat, who explains that the COS is an artificial intelligence developed by Wilczek, and that the Department of Defense is trying to acquire it. Mulder also meets with Wilczek, who has falsely confessed to Lamana's murder. Mulder convinces Wilczek to develop a computer virus that can destroy the COS. Scully doesn't accept Mulder's belief that the COS is sentient, but later discovers the machine hacking into her computer. She joins Mulder at the Eurisko Building to help him destroy the machine.

The COS hinders the agents as they make their way inside. When it shuts down the building's power, Scully climbs through the air vents and is almost pulled into a giant fan, but manages to destroy it. Meanwhile, Mulder is permitted into the COS' control room by Peterson. However, Peterson reveals himself as a mole for the Defense Department and tries to stop Mulder uploading the virus. Scully arrives and holds Peterson at gunpoint, allowing Mulder to upload the virus and destroy the COS.

Mulder again meets with Deep Throat, who explains that Wilczek is being detained by the government at an undisclosed location. When Mulder asks if the COS survived, Deep Throat assures him the virus left no trace of the program and that scientists from the Defense Department examined the machine to no success. At the Eurisko Building, Peterson directs a team attempting to recover the COS, but is told by his superiors to destroy the machine in six hours. Unbeknownst to Peterson, the COS comes back to life and watches as he says to himself, "I'm going to figure this thing out even if it kills me".

== Production ==
The scenes set at Eurisko were filmed in the Metrotower complex in Burnaby, British Columbia, Canada, a building used by the Canadian Security Intelligence Service. The location was barely big enough for the actors to perform in after the crew had finished setting up the necessary equipment. The scene with Scully shooting the fan in the air shaft was a last minute change to the script, replacing an elevator shaft sequence that was deemed too expensive. The episode's title is taken from the title of the book The Ghost in the Machine by Arthur Koestler. The COS and its actions in the episode are an homage to 2001: A Space Odyssey's HAL 9000, who—due to conflicted programming—also became confused and killed people. Mulder and Scully would once again face a malevolent AI in the William Gibson-penned fifth season episode "Kill Switch".

Writers Howard Gordon and Alex Gansa have admitted they were "not computer literate" and felt this was a detriment to their writing. Gordon was disappointed in the episode, stating that it "still qualifies as one of my biggest disappointments", ranking it as the worst episode of the first season. Glen Morgan felt that "parts of the episode worked. What maybe fell a little flat is that we were a little too afraid of doing HAL and, in a sense, I think that's what the building needed; to have a scary personality." James Wong had mixed feelings, saying that the episode "had some neat stuff at the end ... although I think the ending was a little unsatisfying to me visually, as well as in terms of how Mulder comes to dismember the machine. Overall a fun episode." Chris Carter was more supportive of the episode, stating that the script addressed the question of what made up an X-File, and that it doesn't always have to be paranormal. He also felt positive about the episode's action scenes.

== Broadcast and reception ==
"Moreover, there really is a sense of mystery and suspense lacking so far. From the very beginning of this episode, it's clear that the machine is behind the murders, which makes the scenes where Mulder and Scully are interrogating the computer's creator rather pointless."

— Den of Geek's Matt Haigh reviewing "Ghost in the Machine".

"Ghost in the Machine" premiered on the Fox network on October 29, 1993. Following its initial American broadcast, the episode earned a Nielsen household rating of 5.9, with an 11 share—meaning that roughly 5.9 percent of all television-equipped households, and 11 percent of households watching television, were tuned in to the episode. It was viewed by 5.6 million households.

In a retrospective of the first season in Entertainment Weekly, "Ghost in the Machine" was rated a D+. The episode's premise and the COS system were described as "unacknowledged 2001 rip-offs", while the presence of Deep Throat was called "gratuitous"; with both cited, along with an "absence of humor", as the episode's main detractions. Keith Phipps, writing for The A.V. Club, was more favourable to the episode, rating it a B−. He felt that the similarities to 2001: A Space Odyssey and Demon Seed were effective, adding, however, that although the plot worked well, it had dated poorly. Matt Haigh, writing for Den of Geek, reviewed the episode negatively, feeling that the plot was "formulaic", and that it "simply [has] not stood the test of time". However, Haigh felt that Deep Throat's appearance was a highlight of the episode, and praised Mark Snow's score as "extremely atmospheric". The plot for "Ghost in the Machine" was also adapted as a novel for young adults in 1997 by Les Martin.

The Guardian listed "Ghost in the Machine" as one of the "13 best X-Files episodes ever".

== Footnotes ==
=== References ===
- Edwards, Ted (1996). X-Files Confidential. Little, Brown and Company. ISBN 0-316-21808-1.
- Gradnitzer, Louisa; Pittson, Todd (1999). X Marks the Spot: On Location with The X-Files. Arsenal Pulp Press. ISBN 1-55152-066-4.
- Lovece, Frank (1996). The X-Files Declassified. Citadel Press. ISBN 0-8065-1745-X.
- Lowry, Brian (1995). The Truth is Out There: The Official Guide to the X-Files. Harper Prism. ISBN 0-06-105330-9.
