= Roland (The X-Files) =

- The X-Files episode
- Episode no.: Season 1 Episode 23
- Directed by: David Nutter
- Written by: Chris Ruppenthal
- Production code: 1X22
- Original air date: May 6, 1994
- Running time: 45 minutes

Guest appearances
- Željko Ivanek as Roland Fuller / Dr. Arthur Grable; Micole Mercurio as Mrs. Stodie; Kerry Sandomirsky as Tracy; Garry Davey as Dr. Keats; Matthew Walker as Dr. Ronald Surnow; James Sloyan as Dr. Frank Nollette

Episode chronology
← Previous "Born Again"	Next → "The Erlenmeyer Flask"
- The X-Files season 1

"Roland" is the twenty-third episode of the first season of the American science fiction television series The X-Files, premiering on the Fox network on May 6, 1994. It was written by Chris Ruppenthal and directed by David Nutter. The episode featured guest appearances by Željko Ivanek, James Sloyan and Kerry Sandomirsky. The episode is a "Monster-of-the-Week" story, a stand-alone plot which is unconnected to the series' wider mythology. "Roland" earned a Nielsen household rating of 7.9, being watched by 7.4 million households in its initial broadcast; and received mixed reviews from critics, although Ivanek's guest role was met with acclaim.

The show centers on FBI agents Fox Mulder (David Duchovny) and Dana Scully (Gillian Anderson) who work on cases linked to the paranormal, called X-Files. When Mulder and Scully investigate a series of murders at an aerospace testing facility, they find that a mentally disabled janitor may be responsible—and that he is being telepathically controlled by one of the facility's former researchers.

"Roland" was the first of two episodes of The X-Files written by Chris Ruppenthal, who would go on to write the second season episode "3", which was heavily rewritten by series regulars Glen Morgan and James Wong. "Roland" contains the series' first mention of Mulder's father Bill, although the character would not actually make an appearance until the second season episode "Colony".

== Plot ==
At a physics research lab, intellectually disabled janitor Roland Fuller is scolded by scientist Dr. Keats for forgetting how to use the facility's keycard locks. Keats walks in on his colleagues, Frank Nollette and Ronald Surnow, arguing over a prototype jet engine. After Keats and Nollette leave, Surnow enters the facility's wind tunnel to make adjustments. However, Roland activates the tunnel's turbines, killing Surnow. Roland examines the scientists' whiteboard and changes some of its equations.

Fox Mulder (David Duchovny) and Dana Scully (Gillian Anderson) investigate Surnow's death. Scully learns another member of the research team, Arthur Grable, had died several months earlier, and suspects industrial espionage. Mulder examines the handwriting on the whiteboard and concludes it was written by at least four different people, suggesting a fourth individual was present. Keats and Nollette both inform the agents that Roland was the only one left in the facility at the time of Surnow's death, but do not believe him capable of murder.

Nevertheless, Mulder and Scully visit Roland at his care home, where he denies seeing anything unusual. He displays his mathematical prowess by rapidly counting the star designs on Scully's blouse; however, his handwriting does not match the fourth sample from the whiteboard. The discussion ends when Roland experiences a violent vision involving Keats' head being frozen and has what seems to be a fit. Later, he has another vision of someone killing Keats. Roland appears at the lab and submerges Keats' head in a tank of liquid nitrogen, shattering it before typing at a computer. The next day, the agents notice the computer was used hours after Keats' death and realize that the number Roland had written on an art project previously is the password to files containing the work of Grable, which have been worked on since his death.

Investigating Grable's death, the agents learn he had hired Roland. They suspect Grable faked his death and is killing his colleagues, using Roland as a patsy. Grable's body was never brought to the morgue, nor was a funeral held. However, Nollette brings the agents to a cryogenic facility where Grable's remains are being stored. A photo of Grable reveals he is Roland's identical twin. Mulder becomes convinced that Roland is being periodically controlled by Grable.

Nollette sneaks into the cryogenic facility and sabotages Grable's unit, thawing his remains. Roland returns to the lab and is in the process of pushing the prototype engine to mach 15 when Nollette enters. Nollette admits to stealing Grable's work and prepares to shoot Roland; when he is distracted, Roland strikes him and drags him into the wind tunnel. The agents arrive in time to convince Roland not to kill Nollette. At the same time, the rising temperatures in the cryogenic unit kill Grable. Roland is taken from his care home to a psychiatric institute for testing. As he leaves, he combs his hair in the style of his brother, suggesting he is not free of Grable's control.

== Production ==
"Roland" was the first of two episodes of The X-Files written by Chris Ruppenthal. He would return to write the second season episode "3", which was heavily rewritten by series regulars Glen Morgan and James Wong. Željko Ivanek, who plays the episode's title character, was the first actor to read for the part. Series creator Chris Carter felt that Ivanek's audition "just blew [him] away", deciding almost immediately to cast him. Garry Davey, who portrays scientist Dr. Keats, also appeared in several other episodes of the series, and was also at one time the artistic director of the William Davis Centre for Actors Study, working alongside William B. Davis, who plays the series' villain The Smoking Man. Art director Graeme Murrary spent time scouting universities and research facilities in Vancouver to aid in creating the right look for the episode's laboratory and wind tunnel sets.

"Roland" contains the series' first mention of Fox Mulder's father Bill, although the character would not actually make an appearance until the second season episode "Colony". In the original draft of the script for "Roland", however, Mulder's mention of his father was instead meant to be his sister, Samantha. The scene depicting the aftermath of Dr. Keats' murder—with the scattered pieces of his shattered frozen body marked off with multiple chalk outlines—has been described as "truly inspired". Carter noted that "any shock and horror was eliminated by the laugh you got when you saw those little pieces on the floor", also commenting that the actual murder takes place off-screen and is only heard.

== Broadcast and reception ==
"X-Files always set great stock in giving its secondary characters dignity–witness the level-headed portrayal of Native American culture in "Shapes"–and "Roland" no exception. As portrayed by Željko Ivanek, Roland himself never seems anything less than authentic, which gives his struggles a real bite, and his relationship with another mentally handicapped woman has an uncontrived sweetness."

–The A.V. Club's Zack Handlen on "Roland"

"Roland" premiered on the Fox network on May 6, 1994. This episode earned a Nielsen household rating of 7.9, with a 14 share, meaning that in the US, roughly 7.9 percent of all television-equipped households, and 14 percent of households watching television, were tuned in to the episode. It was viewed by 7.4 million households.

Director David Nutter felt that casting Ivanek was the key to creating the episode, feeling that "Roland" was "probably the weakest script from start to finish" that the director had seen, but that once Ivanek had been cast, it became "important to push that as much as possible, to help outweigh the frailties in the script". Carter has also praised Ivanek's involvement with the episode, calling the actor's portrayal "just an amazing performance. This guy, Zeljko, should have won an award for this". Glen Morgan, a regular writer for the series, felt that the episode "wasn't completely effective", but also added that it offered a "softer" outlook compared to the series' other episodes so far, feeling that it was important to include several "episodes that demonstrate the paranormal isn't always horrifying".

In a retrospective of the first season in Entertainment Weekly, "Roland" was rated a B+, with guest star Željko Ivanek's portrayal of the eponymous Roland being called "astonishing (and convincing)", and the episode's "excellent death scenes" noted as highlights. Zack Handlen, writing for The A.V. Club, had mixed feelings about the episode, feeling that its plot was too similar to the previous episode "Born Again", though rating Ivanek's acting as "authentic" and "uncontrived"; ultimately calling the episode "well-built enough to be enjoyable despite its familiarity". Matt Haigh, writing for Den of Geek, felt negatively about the episode, again finding it too similar to other episodes of the season, finding it to be "nothing incredibly exciting", noting that it "follows pretty much the same template as many of the other episodes". A series retrospective by Vulture's Devon Maloney considered it one of the "most embarrassing" episodes of the series' run, pointing out its treatment of neurodivergent characters as being "cringeworthy", but "right in line with the rest in 1994". Maloney drew comparisons between "Roland" and the films Good Will Hunting and What's Eating Gilbert Grape, decrying it for playing up stereotypes of savants at the expense of the title character's personhood. Robert Shearman, in his book Wanting to Believe: A Critical Guide to The X-Files, Millennium & The Lone Gunmen, was critical of the episode's plot, as he also found it derivative of the episode "Born Again"; Shearman also wrote that it was unrealistic that a scientist like Grable would be so driven to prevent his work being furthered posthumously. However, Shearman did write positively of Ivanek's "standout" portrayal of Roland, which he felt "skillfully" treads the "thin line between eerie and sympathetic".

== Footnotes ==
=== References ===
- Edwards, Ted (1996). X-Files Confidential. Little, Brown and Company. ISBN 0-316-21808-1.
- Lovece, Frank (1996). The X-Files Declassified. Citadel Press. ISBN 0-8065-1745-X.
- Lowry, Brian (1995). The Truth is Out There: The Official Guide to the X-Files. Harper Prism. ISBN 0-06-105330-9.
- Shearman, Robert (2009). Wanting to Believe: A Critical Guide to The X-Files, Millennium & The Lone Gunmen. Mad Norwegian Press. ISBN 978-0-9759446-9-1.
