= Ask Harriet =

American television series

- Genre: Sitcom
- Created by: David Cassidy; Jonathan Prince; Billy Riback
- Written by: Jimmy Aleck; Gabrielle Allan; David Cassidy; Pamela Eells; Jim Keily; Peter Murrieta; Ria Pavia; Jonathan Prince; Billy Riback
- Directed by: Amanda Bearse; Robert Berlinger; Ken Levine; Lillah McCarty; Andrew D. Weyman
- Starring: Anthony Tyler Quinn; Lisa Waltz; Jamie Renée Smith; Edward Asner; Willie Garson
- Theme music composer: David Cassidy
- Composer: David Nessim Lawrence
- Country of origin: United States
- Original language: English
- No. of seasons: 1
- No. of episodes: 13 (8 Unaired)

Production
- Executive producers: Jonathan Prince; Billy Riback
- Producers: Matt Dinsmore; Bob Heath
- Cinematography: Ronald W. Browne
- Editor: Art Kellner
- Running time: 30 minutes
- Production companies: Once a Frog Productions; Bris Entertainment; Columbia TriStar Television

Original release
- Network: Fox
- Release: January 4 – January 29, 1998

Ask Harriet is an American television sitcom created by David Cassidy, Jonathan Prince, and Billy Riback, that ran on Fox for one season from January 4 to January 29, 1998. Cassidy also wrote and performed the theme song.

Ask Harriet premiered as a midseason replacement on Sunday, January 4, 1998, and was then moved to its regular timeslot on Thursdays. Thirteen episodes were to be aired on the channel, however, only five episodes were aired. The last episode was broadcast on January 29, 1998.

== Synopsis ==
The premise of the series revolves around a sexist sports journalist named Jack Cody (Anthony Tyler Quinn). After being fired from his job at the Dispatch by his ex-girlfriend Melissa (Lisa Waltz), Jack decides to apply for the job of advice columnist. To hide his true identity, Jack dresses in drag and poses as Sylvia Coco. Jack is rehired and forced to dress as a woman to keep his new job. The series also featured Edward Asner as Mr. Russell, Jamie Renée Smith as Jack's 10-year-old daughter Blair, and Willie Garson as Jack's best friend Ronnie. Julie Benz also appeared in a recurring role.

== Cast ==
- Anthony Tyler Quinn as Jack Cody/Sylvia Coco
- Edward Asner as Mr. Russell
- Willie Garson as Ronnie Rendall
- Damien Leake as Marty
- Patrick Y. Malone as Trey Anderson
- Jamie Renée Smith as Blair Cody
- Lisa Waltz as Melissa Peters

== Episodes ==
No.	Title	Directed by	Written by	Original release date
1	"Pilot"	Andrew D. Weyman	Teleplay by : Billy Riback & Jonathan Prince; Story by : David Cassidy & Billy Riback & Jonathan Prince	January 4, 1998
2	"Hot Coco"	Robert Berlinger	Billy Riback & Jonathan Prince	January 8, 1998
3	"Help Me, Help Me, Rwanda"	Robert Berlinger	Jimmy Aleck & Jim Keily	January 15, 1998
4	"Turn Your Head & Kafka"	Robert Berlinger	Peter Murrieta	January 22, 1998
5	"Lips That Pass in the Night"	Ken Levine	Jim Keily & Jimmy Aleck	January 29, 1998
6	"Fat Ron"	Robert Berlinger	Pamela Eells	UNAIRED
7	"Surprise, Surprise"	Robert Berlinger	Gabrielle Allan & Ria Pavia	UNAIRED
8	"Good for the Goose, Good for the Gender"	Robert Berlinger	Peter Murrieta	UNAIRED
9	"Kiss Harass Good-Bye"	Ken Levine	Eva Almos & Ed Scharlach	UNAIRED
10	"Exes and Ohs"	Steve Zuckerman	Gabrielle Allan & Ria Pavia	UNAIRED
11	"Dis-guise in Love with You: Part 1"	TBD	TBD	UNAIRED
12	"Dis-guise in Love with You: Part 2"	TBD	TBD	UNAIRED
13	"Pumps and Circumstances"	Lillah McCarthy	Pamela Eells	UNAIRED
