= The Erlenmeyer Flask =

- The X-Files episode
- Episode no.: Season 1 Episode 24
- Directed by: R. W. Goodwin
- Written by: Chris Carter
- Production code: 1X23
- Original air date: May 13, 1994
- Running time: 45 minutes

Guest appearances
- Lindsey Ginter as the Crew Cut Man; Anne De Salvo as Dr. Anne Carpenter; Simon Webb as Dr. William Secare; Ken Kramer as Dr. Terrance Berube; Jerry Hardin as Deep Throat; William B. Davis as The Smoking Man

Episode chronology
← Previous "Roland"	Next → "Little Green Men"
- The X-Files season 1

"The Erlenmeyer Flask" is the 24th episode and the first season finale of the science fiction television series The X-Files. Written by executive producer Chris Carter and directed by R. W. Goodwin, the episode continues with the mythology story arc which started with "Pilot". The episode first aired in the United States on the Fox network on May 13, 1994. With 8.3 million households tuning in during its initial broadcast, the episode was the most-viewed episode of the show's first season. The episode received an Edgar Award nomination in the Best Episode in a TV Series category, and has, since broadcast, received positive responses from both critics and crew members.

The show centers on FBI special agents Fox Mulder (David Duchovny) and Dana Scully (Gillian Anderson) who work on cases linked to the paranormal, called X-Files. In this episode, Mulder and Scully discover evidence of secret government experimentation with alien DNA, but the evidence and all of the people who have seen it are promptly identified, located and targeted for elimination by men who are later identified as clandestine operatives.

"The Erlenmeyer Flask" introduced several new plot elements which would continue in later seasons and featured the death of recurring character "Deep Throat" (Jerry Hardin). Carter described the inspiration for the episode as "the result of a year-long learning experience".

== Plot ==
In Maryland, a high-speed police chase unfolds at a waterfront. The driver of the car, Dr. William Secare, is cornered by officers but fights them off with surprising ease. He is shot as he runs up a gangplank and leaps off a ship into the water. The police fail to locate him but discover that his blood is green.

Soon afterwards, Deep Throat (Jerry Hardin) approaches Fox Mulder with Secare's case, saying he is of major importance to revealing the truth. When investigating the case, Mulder and Dana Scully visit Dr. Terrance Berube (Ken Kramer), a scientist working in Gaithersburg whose car was being driven by Secare. That night, Deep Throat meets a second time with Mulder and insists he continue, despite Mulder's uncertainty on what he should be looking for. That night, Berube is confronted by the "Crew Cut Man" (Lindsey Ginter), who kills him and makes the death look like a suicide.

While investigating the crime scene, Mulder finds an Erlenmeyer flask labeled "Purity Control". Scully takes the flask to Georgetown University, where Dr. Anne Carpenter (Anne De Salvo) helps her analyze its contents. Meanwhile, Mulder heads to Berube's home and finds keys for a storage facility. Secare calls Berube's home office and Mulder answers, pretending to be Berube; Secare states that he's been in the water for three days and is hurt. Meanwhile, the Crew Cut Man eavesdrops on the conversation. Secare collapses due to blood loss before he can tell Mulder where he is. While he is driven away in an ambulance, a poisonous gas is emitted from his body when the paramedics perform a needle decompression. Secare recovers and flees from the ambulance.

Mulder arrives at the storage facility and finds five men suspended in tanks, as well as a sixth empty tank. He is pursued when he leaves the facility but escapes. Carpenter reveals that the "Purity Control" flask contains a sample of bacteria that doesn't exist anywhere in nature and can only be described as extraterrestrial. Upon revisiting the storage facility the next day with Scully, Mulder discovers the room to be completely empty. Deep Throat arrives, revealing that Berube was experimenting on humans with extraterrestrial viruses. Six terminally ill volunteers were experimented on, and all had begun recovering. When it was ordered that they be destroyed, Berube helped Secare escape.

Scully learns that Carpenter and her entire family have been killed in a car accident. Mulder returns to Berube's home and finds Secare in the attic. Secare is shot to death by the Crew Cut Man, and Mulder is captured when exposure to the gas escaping from Secare's wound causes him to pass out. Deep Throat meets Scully outside of Mulder's apartment and says that he may be able to make a deal with his captors. He gives Scully the credentials necessary to enter the High Containment Facility at Fort Marlene, where Scully finds an alien fetus contained within liquid nitrogen. At an exchange on a freeway overpass, Deep Throat presents the fetus to the Crew Cut Man, who shoots him seconds later. Mulder is thrown out of the Crew Cut Man's van as he drives off. Scully tends to Deep Throat, whose last words before dying are, "Trust no one".

Several weeks later, a despondent Mulder calls Scully to inform her that the X-Files have been shut down. Meanwhile, in a scene mirroring the conclusion to the pilot, the Smoking Man (who interestingly does not smoke during this scene) stores the alien fetus in the massive evidence room within the Pentagon.

== Production ==
=== Development ===
Chris Carter wrote the teleplay for the episode, which he described as "the result of a year-long learning experience". He tried to firmly establish the mythology of the series, "where we explored the different avenues of government conspiracy, and turning it into more than just flying saucers", and having what the writer called a "defining moment" for Scully, where the agent would hear from a fellow scientist that she was dealing with truly extraterrestrial material. The scene where poisonous fumes were emitted by Dr. Secare was inspired by the case of Gloria Ramirez, which occurred in California in February 1994; Carter remembered this when writing the script, and it became an established aspect of the mythology in subsequent seasons.

The writers killed off the recurring character Deep Throat to give audiences the impression that anyone outside of Mulder and Scully was expendable. The decision to shut down the X-Files was done to separate the agents, allowing the producers to work around Gillian Anderson's pregnancy (which contributed to an important plot development in the second season and affected the rest of the series). The Fox network initially opposed the idea, fearing that closing down the X-Files would lead viewers to believe that the show had been cancelled.

The ending of this episode mirrors that of the "Pilot", including Mulder calling Scully at 11:21 pm and the Smoking Man storing evidence in the Pentagon. The tagline for this episode is "Trust No One", which is the first time in the opening credits the usual phrase "The Truth is Out There" was changed; it references Deep Throat's last words. Executive producer R. W. Goodwin decided to make his directorial debut with the episode, as he considered it "the best script by far", offering "a combination of elation and stark terror".

=== Filming and effects ===
The opening car chase was shot by crew member J. P. Finn, who was the lone producer and directed much of the second unit. It was shot at an abandoned shipyard in North Vancouver known as Versatal Shipyard. Goodwin went so far as saying that the location "was perfect" for them to shoot in; it would be reused in the third season episode "2Shy." The scene with Mulder and Scully visiting Dr. Berube (Ken Kramer) was a "big challenge" due to the use of monkeys; Goodwin wanted the monkeys to all act "crazy" at the same time on cue when filming. When looking back, he said they did a "pretty good job". The location used for the warehouse where Mulder finds the tanks had the address "1616 Pandora", which the producers decided to incorporate into the episode itself as a symbol of Mulder "opening Pandora's box".

The shot of Dr. Secare resurfacing out of the water was created by the visual effects unit. Actor Simon Webb was raised up on a crane under the water, which had been levered so that he could "actually" be raised out of the bay. According to Goodwin, the timing was not quite right, but that failed shot "worked" on a different level and proved to be a "fascinating shot". The scene had to be re-shot later, however. When filming the episode the production crew did not know that Webb had a phobia towards water. The first test shot of Scully removing the alien fetus doll from liquid nitrogen went right, but under the hot studio lights the model started falling apart, leading the following take to flash the lighting in another direction.

== Reception ==
This episode earned a Nielsen rating of 8.8, with a 16 share. It was viewed by 8.3 million households, making it the most viewed episode of the first season. The Mystery Writers of America nominated "The Erlenmeyer Flask" for an Edgar Award in the Best Episode in a TV Series category; the eventual recipient of the award was "Simone Says" of NYPD Blue. John Keegan from Critical Myth gave the episode 9 out of 10, saying it was "the perfect ending to the first season" and a good introduction to The X-Files mythology. Manuel Medoza from The Dallas Morning News said the episode was able to blend "absolutely chilling" moments with "completely silly" moments "at the same time". Entertainment Weekly writer Bruce Fretts concluded that the death of "Deep Throat" made the character "very real".

Crew members have also reacted positively towards the episode. Carter said of the episode: "'The Erlenmeyer Flask' brings back nothing but good memories. It just has terrific images in it; it really brought the series in its first year full circle. It was successful in doing what we wanted to do, which was to close down the X-Files. It shocked a lot of people". Goodwin commented: "Everything about that episode is absolutely first class. The acting, the art direction, the camera work. There's nothing in it that isn't the best you can get, and that's really a credit to a lot of very talented people". The episode introduced many concepts and themes that would appear in the mythology episodes for the show throughout the years including genetic experiments, alien-human hybrids, toxic alien blood, government conspiracies, alien fetuses and deadly assassins.
