= Ice (The X-Files) =

- The X-Files episode
- Episode no.: Season 1 Episode 8
- Directed by: David Nutter
- Written by: Glen Morgan; James Wong
- Production code: 1X07
- Original air date: November 5, 1993
- Running time: 45 minutes

Guest appearances
- Xander Berkeley as Dr. Hodge; Felicity Huffman as Dr. Da Silva; Steve Hytner as Dr. Murphy; Jeff Kober as Bear

Episode chronology
← Previous "Ghost in the Machine"	Next → "Space"

"Ice" is the eighth episode of the first season of the American science fiction television series The X-Files, premiering on the Fox network on November 5, 1993. It was directed by David Nutter and written by Glen Morgan and James Wong. The debut broadcast of "Ice" was watched by 10 million viewers in 6.2 million households. The episode received positive reviews at large from critics, who praised its tense atmosphere.

The plot of the episode shows FBI agents Fox Mulder (David Duchovny) and Dana Scully (Gillian Anderson) investigating the deaths of an Alaskan research team. Isolated and alone, the agents and their accompanying team discover the existence of extraterrestrial parasitic organisms that drive their hosts into impulsive fits of rage.

The episode was inspired by an article in Science News about an excavation in Greenland; series creator Chris Carter said it was also influenced by the John W. Campbell novella Who Goes There? (1938), which had famously been the basis of the films The Thing from Another World (1951) and The Thing (1982). Although the producers thought that "Ice" would save money by being shot in a single location, it ended up exceeding its production budget.

== Plot ==
A mass murder–suicide occurs among a team of geophysicists at an outpost in the Icy Cape of Alaska. FBI agents Fox Mulder and Dana Scully head for the outpost, accompanied by physician Dr. Hodge, toxicologist Dr. Da Silva, geologist Dr. Murphy, and the team's pilot Bear. Along with the bodies of the geophysicists, the group finds a dog that attacks Mulder and Bear. Scully notices black nodules on its skin and suspects that it may be infected with bubonic plague, though she also notices a rash on its neck and movement beneath its skin. Having been bitten by the dog, Bear becomes ill and develops similar nodules on his body, but autopsies reveal no such nodules on the bodies of the geophysicists.

Murphy finds an ice core sample believed to have originated from a meteor crater and theorizes that the sample might be 250,000 years old. Although Bear insists on leaving, the others are concerned about infecting the outside world. When he is asked to provide a stool sample, Bear attacks Mulder and tries to flee. Something moves under his skin, and he dies when Hodge makes an incision at the location of the movement and removes a small worm from the back of his neck. Now without a pilot, the group is informed that evacuation is impossible for a while because of an oncoming storm.

The worm removed from Bear is kept in a jar, while another is recovered from the body of one of the geophysicists. Believing that the worms are extraterrestrial, Mulder wants them kept alive, but Scully feels they should be destroyed to prevent more infections. The group check each other for black nodules and find none, though Mulder reminds Scully that the nodules disappeared from the dog over time. He wakes up in the night to find Murphy in the freezer with his throat slashed; when the others arrive to see him standing over it, all of them—including Scully—lock Mulder in a storage closet as they suspect he has become infected and killed Murphy.

Scully discovers that two worms placed in the same host will kill each other. When the group investigates by putting a second worm into the infected dog, leading the dog to recover when the worms destroy each other. Against Scully's objections and after trapping her in a freezer, Hodge and Da Silva try to put the other worm into Mulder, but Hodge sees movement under Da Silva's skin and realizes she is the infected one who killed Murphy. Da Silva breaks free and the rest pursue her through the outpost until Mulder and Scully restrain her, allowing Hodge to place the last worm inside her. After they are evacuated, Da Silva and the dog are quarantined and the others are released after showing no signs of infection. When Mulder later declares that he wants to return to the site, Hodge tells him that it has been destroyed by the government.

== Production ==
=== Conception and writing ===
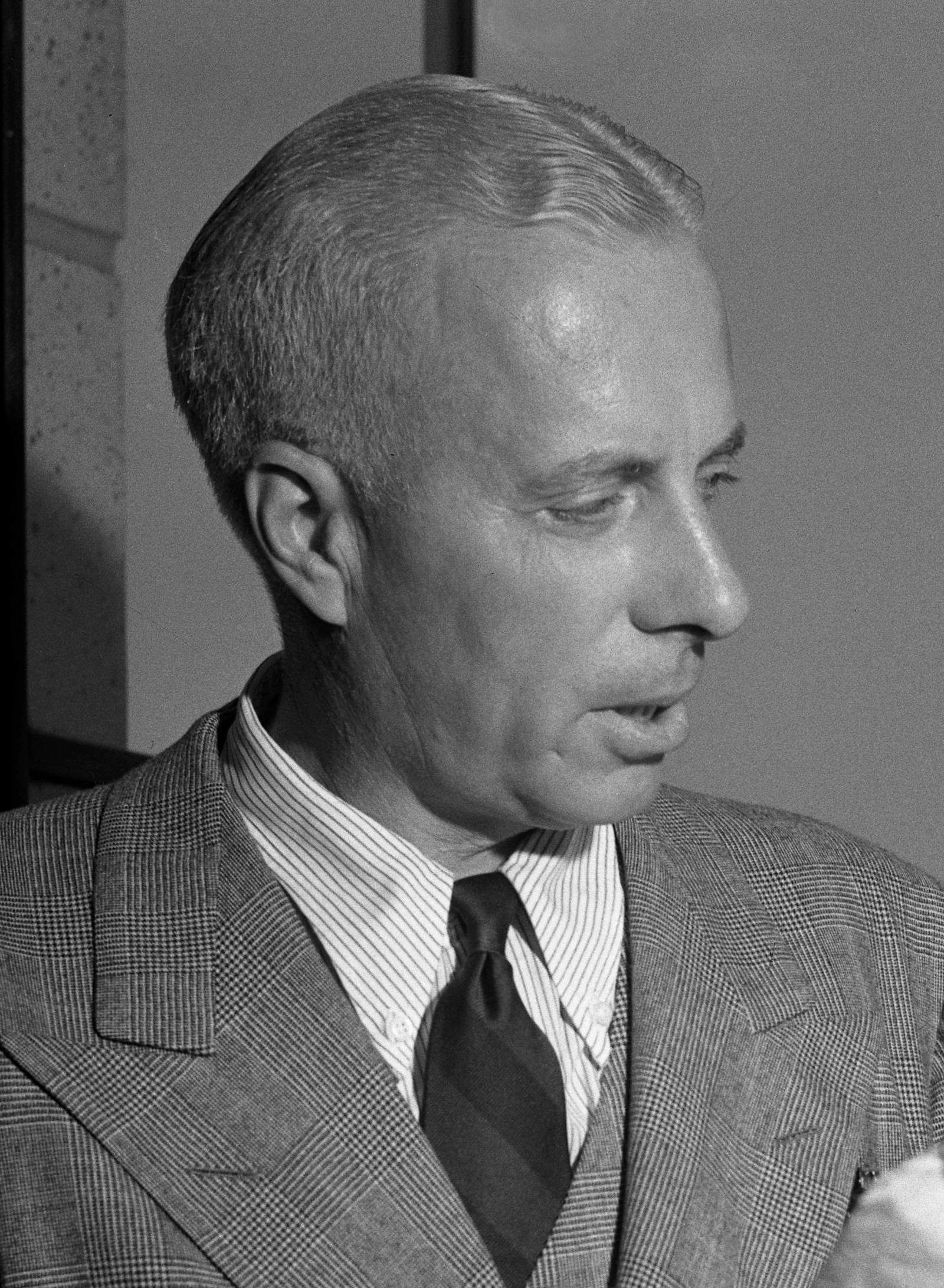
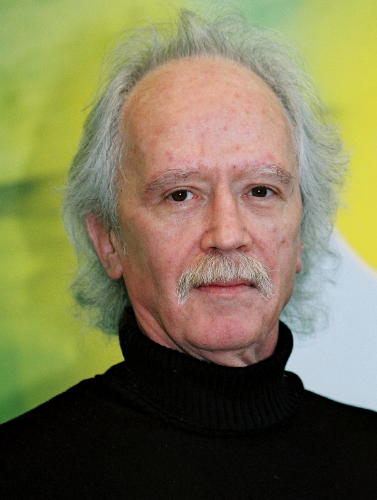
Film adaptations of Who Goes There? by Howard Hawks (left) and John Carpenter (right) influenced the episode.

Glen Morgan began writing the episode after he read a Science News article about men in Greenland who found a 250,000-year-old item encased in ice. The setting—an icy, remote research base overcome by an extraterrestrial creature—is similar to that of John W. Campbell's 1938 novella Who Goes There? and its two feature-film incarnations: The Thing from Another World (1951), directed by Christian Nyby and produced by Howard Hawks, and The Thing (1982), directed by John Carpenter. Chris Carter has cited them as the main inspirations for the episode. As in the novella and films, the characters cannot trust each other because they are uncertain if they are who they seem to be. Carter particularly enjoyed this aspect, because it pitted Mulder and Scully against each other and provided "a new look on their characters early on in the series".

The episode's premise became a recurring theme in the series, with episodes such as "Darkness Falls" and "Firewalker" repeating the combination of remote locations and unknown lifeforms. A similar plot was featured in "The Enemy", a 1995 episode of Morgan and his writing partner James Wong's series Space: Above and Beyond, and according to UGO Networks the Fringe episode "What Lies Below" has "basically" the same plot as "Ice". The episode introduced invertebrate parasites as antagonists in the series; this plot device would recur in "Firewalker", "The Host", "F. Emasculata" and "Roadrunners".

=== Filming ===
The similarity to Carpenter's version of The Thing was due in part to new production designer Graeme Murray, who worked on Carpenter's film and created the complex in which the episode took place. Although "Ice" was intended as a bottle episode which would save money by being shot in a single location, it went over budget. According to Carter, The X-Files typically worked from a small budget and "every dollar we spend ends up on the screen". As a bottle episode, "Ice" used a small cast and its interiors were filmed on a set constructed at an old Molson brewery site. The episode's few exterior shots were filmed at Delta Air Park in Vancouver, whose hangars and flat terrain simulated an Arctic location. Carter said that he would have preferred to set the episode at the North Pole, but he believed that this was unfeasible at the time.

For the worm effect, one member of the special effects department suggested putting a "baby snake" in a latex suit. After explaining that that couldn't be done, animal trainer Debbie Coe suggested using a "super mealworm" to achieve the desired effect. The effect of the worms crawling in the host bodies was achieved with wires under fake skins, including a skin with hair for the dog. Digital effects were used for scenes involving the worms swimming in jars and entering the dog's ear. Although extra footage of the worm scenes was shot so they would last as long as intended if Fox's standards-and-practices officials asked for cuts, no edits were requested. "Ice" was the first significant role in the series for makeup effects artist Toby Lindala, who become its chief makeup artist. The dog used in the episode was a parent of Duchovny's dog, Blue. Ken Kirzinger, who played one of the scientists killed in the episode's cold open, was the series' stunt coordinator.

== Analysis ==
Although "Ice" is not directly connected to the series' overarching mythology, it has been described as "a portent to the alien conspiracy arc which would become more pronounced in the second season" with its themes of alien invasion and governmental conspiracy. The episode is noted for exploring the relationship between its lead characters; Mulder and Scully's trust contrasts with the behavior of Hodge and Da Silva, who are united by a distrust of those around them. The pairs are "mirror images" in their approaches to partnership.

"Ice" features two elements common to other works by Morgan and Wong: dual identities and the questioning of one's personality. In her essay "Last Night We Had an Omen", Leslie Jones noted this thematic leitmotif in several of their other X-Files scripts: "the meek animal-control inspector who is a mutant shape-shifter with a taste for human liver ["Squeeze"], the hapless residents of rural Pennsylvania driven mad by a combination of insecticides and electronic equipment ["Blood"], [and] the uptight PTA run by practicing Satanists ["Die Hand Die Verletzt"]".

Anne Simon, a biology professor at the University of Maryland, discussed the episode in her book Monsters, Mutants and Missing Links: The Real Science Behind the X-Files. Simon noted that like the worms in "Ice", parasitic worms can attach to the human hypothalamus because it is not blocked by the blood–brain barrier. She compared "Ice" to the later episodes "Tunguska" and "Gethsemane", with their common theme of extraterrestrial life reaching earth through panspermia.

== Reception ==
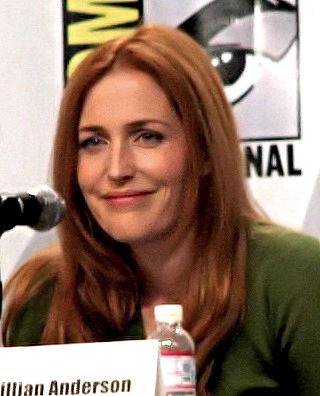
According to a reviewer, Dana Scully (actor Gillian Anderson pictured) was portrayed more intelligently in "Ice" than in her debut in "Pilot".

=== Ratings ===
"Ice" originally aired on Fox on November 5, 1993. The episode's initial American broadcast received a Nielsen rating of 6.6 with an 11 share; about 6.6 percent of all households with television and 11 percent of households watching TV viewed the episode, a total of 6.2 million households and 10 million viewers. "Ice" and "Conduit" were released on VHS in 1996, and the episode was released on DVD as part of the complete first season.

=== Reviews ===
"Ice" was praised by critics. In The Complete X-Files, authors Matt Hurwitz and Chris Knowles called the episode a milestone for the fledgling series. An Entertainment Weekly first-season retrospective graded "Ice" as A−, calling it "particularly taut and briskly paced". On The A.V. Club, Keith Phipps praised the episode and gave it an A. According to Phipps, the cast "plays the paranoia beautifully" and the episode was "as fine an hour as this first season would produce". "Ice" was included on an A.V. Club list of greatest bottle episodes, where it was described as "us[ing] its close quarters as an advantage". A third A.V. Club article, listing ten "must-see" episodes of the series, called "Ice" "the first sign that this show had a shot at really being something special" and said that it "makes great use of claustrophobia and the uneasy but growing alliance between the heroes".

Digital Spy's Ben Rawson-Jones described the episode's stand-off between Mulder and Scully as "an extremely tense moment of paranoia." A New York Daily News review called the episode "potent and creepy", and said that its plot "was worthy of honorary passage into The Twilight Zone". Matt Haigh called it "an extremely absorbing and thrilling episode" on the Den of Geek website, noting its debt to The Thing, and Juliette Harrisson called "Ice" the "finest" stand-alone episode of the first season. On the TV Squad blog, Anna Johns called it "a spectacular episode" with an "excellent" opening. UGO Networks called the episode's worms among the series' best "Monsters-of-the-Week" and the cause of "much pointed-guns aggression". In Tor.com, Meghan Deans compared the scene where Mulder and Scully inspect each other for infection to a similar scene in "Pilot"; in "Ice", both characters were equally vulnerable and (unlike the pilot scene) Scully was not portrayed as "an idiot". Robert Shearman, in his book Wanting to Believe: A Critical Guide to The X-Files, Millennium & The Lone Gunmen, gave the episode five out of five stars. Calling it "the most influential episode ever made", Shearman noted that the series would end up reusing the episode's formula several times over the course of the series' run. Shearman further felt that although their script was derivative, Morgan and Wong created "a pivotal story" by combining crucial themes from The Thing with a "well rounded" cast of characters.

"Ice" was also considered one of the best episodes of the first season by the production crew. According to Carter, Morgan and Wong "just outdid themselves on this show, as did director David Nutter, who really works so hard for us. I think they wrote a great script and he did a great job directing it, and we had a great supporting cast". Nutter said: "The real great thing about 'Ice' is that we were able to convey a strong sense of paranoia. It was also a great ensemble piece. We're dealing with the most basic emotions of each character, ranging from their anger to their ignorance and fear. It established the emotional ties these two characters have with each other, which is very important. Scaring the hell out of the audience was definitely the key to the episode". Anderson said that "it was very intense. There was a lot of fear and paranoia going on. We had some great actors to work with".
