= Lisa Waltz =

American actress

- Born: August 31, 1961 (age 65); Limerick, Pennsylvania, U.S.
- Education: Carnegie Mellon University
- Years active: 1984–present
- Spouse: Mark Morocco

Lisa Waltz is an American actress who has had roles in many television shows and who played Nora in the film adaptation of Brighton Beach Memoirs.

== Personal life ==
Waltz was born and raised in Limerick, Pennsylvania, the daughter of Bobby and the late Bill Waltz, owners of Waltz Golf Farm. She attended Spring-Ford Area High School in Royersford, Pennsylvania, and Carnegie Mellon University. She is married to Dr. Mark Morocco.

== Career ==
She has appeared in several television series, including My So-Called Life, Boston Legal, CSI: Miami, Frasier, Inconceivable, Side Order of Life, Ask Harriet, The Young and the Restless, The Agency, The X-Files, Castle and 90210.

Waltz played Melinda Bauer, the mother of Kiefer Bauer and wife to Warren Bauer, on General Hospital in 2010.

She also played Suzanne on Fear the Walking Dead: Flight 462.

== Filmography ==
=== Film ===
Year	Title	Role	Notes
1986	Brighton Beach Memoirs	Nora	
1992	Pet Sematary Two	Amanda Gilbert	
1992	The Opposite Sex and How to Live with Them	Lizbeth	
1993	Stone Soup	Ava	
1996	Red Ribbon Blues	Bones	
1998	The Odd Couple II	Hannah Unger	
1999	Starry Night	Kathy Madison	
2005	Yours, Mine & Ours	Reunion Classmate	
2009	Alpha Males Experiment	Stacy	
2011	The Back-Up Bride	Darlene Bingham	

=== Television ===
Year	Title	Role	Notes
1987	CBS Summer Playhouse	Holly	Episode: "Puppetman"
1989	Heartbeat	Mary Kazak	Episode: "South and a Little to the Right of Eden"
1989	Night Court	Rita Vargas	Episode: "Pen Pal"
1989	Thirtysomething	Beth	Episode: "Legacy"
1989	Wiseguy	Lauren Burroughs	Episodes: "Call It Casaba", "People Do It All the Time"
1990	Father Dowling Mysteries	Sarah McMasters	Episode: "The Falling Angel Mystery"
1990	Matlock	Frances 'Frannie' Morrissey	Episode: "The Cover Girl"
1991	Monsters	Katharine	Episode: "The Waiting Room"
1991	Quantum Leap	Lilly	Episode: "Justice"
1992	Nurses	Gail	Episode: "The Truth Shall Screw You Up"
1992	Melrose Place	Liz McBain	Episode: "House of God"
1993	Northern Exposure	Stephie O'Connell	Episode: "Grosse Pointe, 48230"
1993	Herman's Head	Carin	Episode: "Love and the Single Parent"
1993	The X-Files	Lauren Kyte	Episode: "Shadows"
1994	Roswell	Janet Foss	TV film
1994–1995	My So-Called Life	Hallie Lowenthal	Recurring Role
1995	Mad About You	Didi	Episode: "The Couple"
1995	Can't Hurry Love	Gail Tanny	Episode: "Party Chicks"
1996	Can't Hurry Love	Gail Tanny	Episode: "The Rent Strike"
1996	ER	Mrs. Wimbur	Episode: "It's Not Easy Being Greene"
1996	Dark Skies	Andrea 'Andi' Sayers	Episode: "Hostile Convergence"
1996	Touched by an Angel	Nora	Episode: "The Violin Lesson"
1997	Pacific Palisades	Shirley	Episode: "Welcome to the Neighborhood"
1998	Frasier	Tricia	Episode: "Party, Party"
1998	Ask Harriet	Melissa Peters	Main role
1999	Providence	Tracy Owens	Episode: "Sisters"
1999	The Strip	Jamie Boston	Episode: "Money for Nothing"
2001	Frasier	Tricia	Episode: "Don Juan in Hell: Part 2"
2001–2002	The Agency	Patrice DeAllo	Recurring Role
2002	Strong Medicine	Dr. Doris Pasternak	Episode: "Flesh and Blood"
2003	Boomtown	Pamela Donner	Episode: "Lost Child"
2003	Cold Case	Melanie Whitley	Episode: "Look Again"
2003	Line of Fire	Evangeline Mattington	Episode: "Undercover Angel"
2004	Everwood	Diane Shumacher	Episodes: "Unspoken Truths", "Unfinished Business"
2004	Tru Calling	Grace	Episode: "D.O.A."
2004	Nip/Tuck	Trudy Nye	Episode: "Trudy Nye"
2004	Medical Investigation	Ms. Johnson	Episode: "The Unclean"
2005	Inconceivable	Ellen Gilley	Recurring Role
2005	Commander in Chief	Alison Remarque	Episodes: "First Choice", "First Strike"
2005	CSI: Miami	Brenda Hall	Episode: "Nailed"
2006	Criminal Minds	Judy Homefeldt	Episode: "North Mammon"
2007	Ghost Whisperer	Heather	Episode: "Children of Ghosts"
2007	Bones	Jean Marie Howard	Episode: "Spaceman in a Crater"
2007	Boston Legal	Dorothy Scanlon	Episode: "Trial of the Century"
2007	Side Order of Life	Dr. Misty Rain	Recurring Role
2007	Without a Trace	Monica Beckett	Episode: "Claus and Effect"
2007–2011	The Young and the Restless	Dr. Mason	Recurring Role
2009	Castle	Laurie Horn	Episode: "Hell Hath No Fury"
2009	Lie to Me	Mrs. Roland	Episode: "Black Friday"
2009	The Eastmans	Heather Queenan	Unsold TV Pilot
2010	General Hospital	Melinda Bauer	Recurring Role
2010	Miami Medical	Leslie	Episode: "Golden Hour"
2010	Private Practice	Rachel	"What Happens Next"
2010–2011	90210	Katherine Upton	Recurring Role
2012	The Finder	Karyn Welling	Episode: "Eye of the Storm"
2012	Perception	Sandy Shelby	Episode: "Messenger"
2015–2016	Fear the Walking Dead: Flight 462	Suzanne, Marcus's Wife	Recurring Role
