= Shadows (The X-Files) =

- The X-Files episode
- Episode no.: Season 1 Episode 6
- Directed by: Michael Katleman
- Written by: Glen Morgan; James Wong
- Production code: 1X05
- Original air date: October 22, 1993
- Running time: 45 minutes

Guest appearances
- Barry Primus as Robert Dorlund; Lisa Waltz as Lauren Kyte; Lorena Gale as Ellen Bledsoe; Deryl Hayes as Agent Webster; Veena Sood as Agent Saunders; Tom Heaton as cemetery groundskeeper

Episode chronology
← Previous "The Jersey Devil"	Next → "Ghost in the Machine"
- The X-Files season 1

"Shadows" is the sixth episode of the first season of the American science fiction television series The X-Files, premiering on the Fox network on October 22, 1993. It was written by Glen Morgan and James Wong, directed by Michael Katleman and featured guest appearances by Barry Primus and Lisa Waltz. The episode is a "monster-of-the-week" story, unconnected to the series' wider mythology. "Shadows" earned a Nielsen household rating of 5.9, being watched by 5.6 million households in its initial broadcast. The episode was not well-received by the production staff and received mixed reviews from critics.

The show centers on FBI agents Fox Mulder (David Duchovny) and Dana Scully (Gillian Anderson) who work on cases linked to the paranormal, called "X-files". In this episode, Mulder and Scully investigate the death of two muggers and, as they discover covert arms deals made with Middle Eastern radicals, encounter an office worker who may be haunted by the spirit of her dead boss, who is using her to uncover his murderer.

This episode, inspired by the 1982 horror film The Entity, was written due to insistence by Fox executives on more episodes where Mulder and Scully help others. This allowed the writers some space to create other episodes they had in mind.

== Plot ==
Two muggers are found dead in a Philadelphia back alley after attempting to rob a woman, Lauren Kyte (Lisa Waltz), at an automated teller machine. FBI agents Fox Mulder (David Duchovny) and Dana Scully (Gillian Anderson) investigate the case when called in by a secretive pair of agents from an unknown federal agency. The bodies are found to have an electrostatic charge, and their throats appear to have been crushed from the inside. Meanwhile, Lauren sees her boss, Robert Dorlund (Barry Primus), and gives her two weeks notice due to her grief over the suicide of her old boss and Dorlund's partner, Howard Graves.

Mulder and Scully determine that one of the dead muggers belonged to an Islamic terrorist group, the Isfahan, and, using the ATM's surveillance video, are able to track down Lauren. A frame of the video appears to show an additional blurry figure. When the agents interview Lauren at her home, she reluctantly admits to the incident, but knows nothing about the murders. Upon leaving, the agents find their car going out of control on its own, causing it to crash. At the FBI's repair garage, the car is found to have no evidence of tampering, but an electrical charge is detected within it.

Upon visiting Graves' headstone, the agents learn of his purported suicide and the death of his daughter at a young age, who would be Lauren's age if she were still alive. Scully suspects that Graves faked his death, but after consulting the pathologist who examined his body and testing a donated organ, finds that he is in fact dead. Meanwhile, Lauren experiences a vision at night, including blood appearing in her bathtub, that leads her to believe that Graves was murdered.

At her going-away party, Lauren is threatened by Dorlund over knowledge of confidential information that could implicate him. Lauren calls the agents to her home, but before they get there, two assassins arrive to kill her. An invisible force kills both of them just as Mulder and Scully arrive, with Mulder witnessing the body of one assassin floating in midair.

Lauren is questioned by Mulder, Scully, and the two unknown agents, who believe Graves' and Dorlund's company sold export-controlled technology to the Isfahan. Lauren admits to Mulder and Scully that the sales took place, and that she believes Dorlund had Graves killed. After hearing Lauren recount the eerie circumstances she believes are being caused by Graves' spirit, Scully—the usually reserved skeptic—readily accepts her story. After Lauren leaves, Scully explains she was just humoring her.

The agents search the company's premises but are unable to find any evidence. When Lauren attacks Dorlund with a letter opener, Graves' spirit takes it and cuts open the wallpaper in Dorlund's office, revealing a hidden floppy disk. Weeks later, Lauren starts her new job in Omaha, Nebraska; it is implied that Graves' spirit may have followed her there.

== Production ==
This episode was created on the Fox network's insistence that the creators write more episodes where Mulder and Scully help people. This episode was written to accomplish that, and to allow the writers some space to create other episodes they had in mind. Co-writer Glen Morgan claims the episode was inspired by the movie The Entity (1982). The name Tom Braidwood, the show's assistant director who later played Lone Gunmen member Melvin Frohike, is used in the scene where a parking lot attendant paints over the name of Howard Graves. The episode featured guest appearances by Barry Primus, Lisa Waltz, Lorena Gale and Veena Sood.

Fox's marketing for the episode emphasized the horror aspect of "Shadows" by using the tagline "Don't watch it alone" in advertisements. During the episode, Mulder jokes that Elvis was the only man ever to have successfully faked his own death. The joke would eventually become the first of many similar Elvis jokes littered throughout most of the series. When Mulder wonders whether or not the paranormal activity could have been the work of a poltergeist, Scully mocks him by replying, "They're here," a tagline and famous quote from the film Poltergeist (1982).

== Broadcast and reception ==
"It wasn't a great script. I thought the director did a good job with it. It was entertaining, but not my favorite episode. The network wanted a lot more relatable things. Originally we made this girl a lot more interesting, but because they wanted relatable things, we made her a secretary, and it wasn't really involving".

— James Wong on writing "Shadows"

"Shadows" premiered on Fox on October 22, 1993. The episode earned a Nielsen household rating of 5.9 with an 11 share—meaning that in the US, 5.9 percent of television-equipped households, and 11 percent of all households actively watching television, were watching the program. It was viewed by 5.6 million households.

In a retrospective of the first season in Entertainment Weekly, "Shadows" was rated a C+, with the episode being called "exceedingly awkward," while the political context was seen as a weak point. Keith Phipps, writing for The A.V. Club, had mixed feeling about the episode, rating it a C+. He felt that the episode's plot worked well, though the supernatural elements seemed "a little corny." Matt Haigh, writing for Den of Geek, was more positive about the episode, calling it "fun viewing" and feeling that "with characters we could care about and a far more rounded plot, this proved one of the better episodes so far. I still wouldn’t call it a particularly brilliant one, though, either."

Co-writer James Wong felt that the changes he was asked to make to the script led to "Shadows" turning out to be "an average episode," although he felt "the director did a good job with it." His partner Glen Morgan had a similar opinion, calling it "a little too ordinary, like you have seen it before, which is exactly what the network wanted at the time." Chris Carter had a more positive view of the episode, calling it "very well done, really great effects, and more of a meat-and-potatoes kind of story. An FBI sting and a good mystery that Mulder and Scully investigate. Overall, a really solid episode."

The plot for "Shadows" was also adapted as a novel for young adults in 2000 by Ellen Steiber, under the title Haunted.

== Footnotes ==
=== References ===
- Edwards, Ted (1996). X-Files Confidential. Little, Brown and Company. ISBN 0-316-21808-1.
- Lovece, Frank (1996). The X-Files Declassified. Citadel Press. ISBN 0-8065-1745-X.
- Lowry, Brian (1995). The Truth is Out There: The Official Guide to the X-Files. Harper Prism. ISBN 0-06-105330-9.
- Steiber, Ellen (2000). Haunted: A Novelization. HarperCollins. ISBN 0-06-106618-4.
