= The X-Files season 1 =

Season of television series

The X-Files
- Season 1
- DVD cover
- Starring: David Duchovny; Gillian Anderson
- No. of episodes: 24

Release
- Original network: Fox
- Original release: September 10, 1993 – May 13, 1994

Season chronology
- Next → Season 2

The first season of the science fiction and horror television series The X-Files commenced airing on the Fox network in the United States on September 10, 1993, and concluded on the same channel on May 13, 1994, after airing all 24 episodes.

The first season introduced main characters of the series, including Fox Mulder and Dana Scully who were portrayed by David Duchovny and Gillian Anderson, respectively, and recurring characters Deep Throat, Walter Skinner, and Cigarette Smoking Man. The season introduced the series' main concept, revolving around the investigation of paranormal or supernatural cases, known as X-Files, by the Federal Bureau of Investigation; it also began to lay the groundwork for the series' overarching mythology.

Initially influenced by Kolchak: The Night Stalker and The Twilight Zone, series creator Chris Carter pitched the idea for the series to Fox twice before it was accepted for production. The season saw the series quickly gaining popularity, with ratings rising steadily throughout its run; and garnered generally positive reviews from critics and the media. It helped to make stars of its two lead roles, and several of its taglines and catchphrases have since become cultural staples.

== Concept and themes ==
Although Carter initially conceived of the series based on the influence of Kolchak and The Twilight Zone, he has stated that the "leaping-off point" for the series' overall concept came from UFO lore. After being introduced to the works of John E. Mack—especially a study by Mack that reported that 3% of Americans claimed to have been abducted by aliens—Carter believed he had found his central theme. It was decided that the series would focus on the FBI to avoid something Carter had seen as a failing in Kolchak, whereby mysterious events would continually occur in one locale and be accidentally uncovered by the same character—by creating a fictional FBI unit which actively uncovered these paranormal cases, it was felt that the series would be "sustainable week after week without stretching the parameters of credibility". Early in the planning stages, Carter had envisioned that a significant proportion of the episodes would deal with investigations which uncovered hoaxes or cases which had been mistakenly viewed as paranormal. Although this decision never came to pass, the third-season episode "Jose Chung's From Outer Space" can be seen as a holdover from the idea.

The series revolves around its two main characters, which had been defined early in conception as the "believer" and the "skeptic". Of these, the "believer", Fox Mulder, was created with a character-defining personal motivation, involving the disappearance of his younger sister during his childhood, which he would believe to be a result of alien abduction. The creation of the "skeptic", Dana Scully, was influenced by Jodie Foster's portrayal of Clarice Starling in The Silence of the Lambs, leading the crew to decide that the character needed to seem "real", as opposed to the "bombshell" type of character the studio was pressing for.

Thematically, although the series focused heavily on alien abduction lore, the decision was made early on to allow the plots of individual episodes to branch out into different territories to prevent the overarching plot from running out of momentum, which led to standalone episodes such as "Squeeze" being developed. The variety of storylines which the series has shown has led director Daniel Sackheim to note that "The X-Files has found its own style in that it doesn't have a confined style to it", adding that the series' "fluid" approach has meant that "everybody who comes on the show attempt to make a little scary movie". To this end, several episodes feature varying plots, with alien-influenced storylines varying between "Ice", a "briskly-paced" episode set in one location, and the character-driven "Conduit", which served to fill in background on the characters. Elsewhere, plots focused on soul transference or reincarnation, with the episodes "Shadows", "Born Again" and "Lazarus" sharing similar storylines. The plot of "Ghost in the Machine" featured a malevolent AI; while "Shapes" introduced the first of what would become several Native American-themed episodes.

The first season also introduced many minor characters who would go on to become central figures to the series—The Lone Gunmen, first seen in "E.B.E.", would become regular characters beginning the second season, eventually starring in the spin-off series The Lone Gunmen; whilst the episode "Tooms" introduced Walter Skinner, portrayed by Mitch Pileggi, who would go on to be billed as a series star by the ninth season. The abduction of Mulder's sister Samantha was explored in the episodes "Pilot", "Conduit", and "Miracle Man", and would go on to become one of the central themes of the series as a whole.

== Production ==
=== Development ===
California native Chris Carter was allowed to produce new shows for the Fox network in the early 1990s. Tired of the comedies he had been working on for Walt Disney Pictures, inspired by a report that aliens may have abducted 3.7 million Americans, and recalling memories of Watergate and the 1970s horror series Kolchak: The Night Stalker, Carter came up with the idea for The X-Files and wrote the pilot episode in 1992. He initially struggled over the untested concept—executives wanted a love interest for Scully—and casting. The network wanted either a more established or a "taller, leggier, blonder and breastier" actress for Scully than the 24-year-old Gillian Anderson, a theater veteran with minor film experience, who Carter felt was the only choice after auditions.

Carter's initial pitch for The X-Files was rejected by Fox executives. He fleshed out the concept and returned a few weeks later, leading to the commission of the pilot. Carter worked with NYPD Blue producer Daniel Sackheim in further developing the pilot, drawing stylistic inspiration from the 1988 documentary The Thin Blue Line, and the English television series Prime Suspect. Inspiration was also taken from Carter's memories of watching Kolchak: The Night Stalker and The Twilight Zone in his youth; as well as from the then-recently released film The Silence of the Lambs, which was the impetus for framing the series around agents from the FBI, in order to provide the characters with a more plausible reason for being involved in each case than Carter believed was present in Kolchak. Carter was also keen on keeping the relationship between the two lead roles strictly platonic, basing their interactions on the characters of Emma Peel (Diana Rigg) and John Steed (Patrick Macnee) in the series The Avengers.

During the early stages of production for the series, Carter founded Ten Thirteen Productions and began planning to film the pilot in L.A. However, unable to find suitable locations for many of the scenes, Ten Thirteen Productions decided to "go where the good forests are", and moved production to Vancouver, where the series would remain for the next five seasons; production would eventually shift to Los Angeles beginning with the sixth season. It was soon realized by the production crew that since so much of the first season would require filming on location, rather than on sound stages, two location managers would be needed, rather than the usual one.

=== Casting ===
David Duchovny had worked in L.A. for three years before The X-Files, and initially wanted to build his acting career in film. But in 1993, his manager, Melanie Green, gave him a script for the pilot episode of the series. Green and Duchovny were both convinced it was a good script, so Duchovny auditioned for the lead. When Duchovny was auditioning for the part of Fox Mulder, he made a "terrific" audition, but spoke rather slowly. Chris Carter thought that at the beginning of the auditioning for the character, he was a "good judge of character", and thought that Duchovny wasn't "bright". So he went and talked to Duchovny and asked him if he could "please" imagine himself as an FBI agent for the "future" week. The show's casting director was very positive about him. According to Carter, Duchovny turned out to be one of the best-read people he knew. Carter recalls being contractually obliged to provide Fox with a choice of two actors for the role; however, he was confident Duchovny was the right choice from the outset. After getting the role, Duchovny thought the show wouldn't last or that it wouldn't make much impact.

Gillian Anderson was cast due to Carter's insistence that she would fit the role perfectly; however, Fox executives wanted a more glamorous "bombshell" for the part, hoping this would introduce a romantic element to the series. This led Carter to insist that he did not want Mulder and Scully to become romantically involved, citing the relationship between the lead roles in Moonlighting as an example to avoid. Anderson called her early work on the show "a complete learning experience for me – the pilot was only the second time I'd been in front of a camera".

The series also introduced the character of Walter Skinner, played by Mitch Pileggi, who would go on to become a recurring and later a main character in the show. The character had been conceived as playing against the stereotypical bureaucratic "paper-pusher", being instead someone more "quietly dynamic". Pileggi had auditioned unsuccessfully for several other parts on the series before being cast as Skinner. At first, the fact that he was asked back to audition for the role had puzzled him, until he discovered the reason he had not been cast for the previous parts—Chris Carter had been unable to imagine Pileggi as any of those characters, since the actor had been shaving his head. When Pileggi attended the audition for Walter Skinner, he had been in a grumpy mood and had allowed his small amount of hair to grow back. Pileggi's attitude fit well with Skinner's character, leading Carter to assume the actor was only pretending to be grumpy. After successfully auditioning for the role, Pileggi thought he had been lucky that he had not been cast in one of the earlier roles, as he believed he would have appeared in only a single episode and would have missed the opportunity to play the recurring role of Walter Skinner.

Glen Morgan and James Wong's early influence on The X-Files mythology led to their introduction of popular secondary characters who would continue for years in episodes written by others, such as the Scully family—Dana's father William (Don S. Davis), mother Margaret (Sheila Larken) and sister Melissa (Melinda McGraw)—as well as conspiracy-buff trio The Lone Gunmen.

=== Writing ===
Initially, there was no certainty about how long the series would run, and as a result, there was no long-term plan to guide its writers. Although the initial impetus for the show was based on alien abduction lore, the crew believed that the series would not be able to maintain its momentum for long if it did not branch out into different plot ideas. The show's first season thus featured numerous standalone stories involving monsters, and also diverse alien or governmental cover-ups, often with no apparent connection to each other—such as the Arctic space worms in "Ice", and the conspiracy of genetically engineered twins in "Eve". Carter himself wrote "Space", an intended bottle episode about a manifested alien "ghost" in the NASA space shuttle program, which was subject to cost overruns and became the most expensive of the first season.

By the end of the first season, Carter and his staff had developed many of the core concepts of the mythology that would endure throughout all nine seasons. The first season introduced the series' primary antagonist, Cigarette Smoking Man, and gave early insight into the disappearance of Mulder's sister Samantha, whose abduction provided one of the main plot threads of the series as a whole. The emergent mythology was further solidified in the Carter-penned, Edgar Award-nominated season finale "The Erlenmeyer Flask". The episode was written before it was known whether or not the series would be renewed, and featured the closure of the X-Files unit and the reassignment of Fox Mulder and Dana Scully to new jobs within the FBI. The finale was the first episode directed by R. W. Goodwin, who had served as producer for the series.

=== Crew ===
Series creator Chris Carter also served as executive producer and showrunner and wrote nine episodes. Co-executive producers and writing team Glen Morgan and James Wong wrote six episodes. Supervising producers and writing team Alex Gansa and Howard Gordon wrote five episodes together, with Gordon co-writing an additional script with Carter. Co-producers and writing team Larry and Paul Barber wrote one episode. Executive script consultant Chris Ruppenthal wrote one episode. Kenneth Biller and Chris Brancato co-wrote a freelance script. Other freelance writers included Scott Kaufer and Marilyn Osborn, who each wrote one episode. Other producers included line producer Joseph Patrick Finn and co-producer Paul Rabwin.

David Nutter directed the most episodes of the first season, directing six. "Pilot" supervising producer Daniel Sackheim directed two episodes. Other directors that directed two episodes included Jerrold Freedman, William Graham, Michael Lange, Joe Napolitano and Larry Shaw. One-episode directors included Rob Bowman, Fred Gerber, co-executive producer R. W. Goodwin, Michael Katleman, Harry Longstreet and Robert Mandel who directed the pilot episode.

== Cast ==
=== Main cast ===
- David Duchovny as Special Agent Fox Mulder
- Gillian Anderson as Special Agent Dana Scully

=== Recurring cast ===
- Jerry Hardin as Deep Throat
- William B. Davis as Cigarette Smoking Man

=== Guest cast ===
- Doug Hutchison as Eugene Victor Tooms
- Charles Cioffi as Scott Blevins
- Mitch Pileggi as Walter Skinner
- Bruce Harwood as John Fitzgerald Byers
- Tom Braidwood as Melvin Frohike
- Dean Haglund as Richard Langly
- Zachary Ansley as Billy Miles
- Scott Bellis as Max Fenig
- Don S. Davis as William Scully
- Lindsey Ginter as Crew Cut Man
- Sarah Koskoff as Theresa Nemman
- Sheila Larken as Margaret Scully

== Episodes ==
Episodes marked with a double dagger (‡) are episodes in the series' alien mythology arc.

No. overall	No. in season	Title	Directed by	Written by	Original release date	Prod. code	U.S. viewers (millions)
1	1	"Pilot"‡	Robert Mandel	Chris Carter	September 10, 1993	1X79	12.0
Agent Dana Scully is assigned to work with Agent Fox Mulder on the X-Files in an attempt to debunk his work on the paranormal. Their first case has them investigating apparent alien abductions. A near comatose man, Billy Miles, is taking his classmates, including Theresa Nemman, into the woods, where they are killed in a flash of bright light.
2	2	"Deep Throat"‡	Daniel Sackheim	Chris Carter	September 17, 1993	1X01	11.1
Mulder and Scully travel to Idaho to investigate the disappearance of a military test pilot. They observe unusual aircraft activity, prompting Mulder to proclaim the existence of a government conspiracy. Mulder sneaks onto the military base and is spotlighted by one of the craft, but is captured by soldiers and has his memory erased before he is released.
3	3	"Squeeze"	Harry Longstreet	Glen Morgan & James Wong	September 24, 1993	1X02	11.1
Mulder and Scully investigate a series of murders where there appears to be no tangible method for the murderer's entrance and escape. Eugene Victor Tooms, a seemingly normal janitor, is suspected by Mulder to be a mutant who kills his victims and extracts their livers in order to prolong his existence.
4	4	"Conduit"	Daniel Sackheim	Alex Gansa & Howard Gordon	October 1, 1993	1X03	9.2
As Section Chief Scott Blevins expresses his concern with the direction of the X-Files department, Mulder becomes obsessed with solving a case that closely parallels an encounter he experienced as a child, which dealt with alien abduction and an exploration of Mulder's determination to find his sister, Samantha Mulder.
5	5	"The Jersey Devil"	Joe Napolitano	Chris Carter	October 8, 1993	1X04	10.4
The murder of a homeless man which is very similar in detail to a murder committed in 1947 leads Mulder and Scully to the legendary man-beast the Jersey Devil roaming in the forests surrounding Atlantic City.
6	6	"Shadows"	Michael Katleman	Glen Morgan & James Wong	October 22, 1993	1X05	8.8
When an unseen force commits several murders where a young woman is present, Mulder suspects that it is the spirit of the woman's former boss who was believed to have committed suicide but was actually murdered and he is protecting her from his business partner.
7	7	"Ghost in the Machine"	Jerrold Freedman	Alex Gansa & Howard Gordon	October 29, 1993	1X06	9.5
A computer with highly advanced artificial intelligence begins to kill in order to preserve its existence when it is deemed too inefficient to continue controlling the workings of an office building.
8	8	"Ice"	David Nutter	Glen Morgan & James Wong	November 5, 1993	1X07	10.0
When an Arctic research team mysteriously kill each other and themselves only days after drilling deeper into the ice than ever before, Mulder and Scully accompany a team of doctors and scientists to investigate. They discover an organism which infects living creatures and amplifies the host's feeling of anger and paranoia, and the new team starts to deteriorate as they wonder who among them are killers.
9	9	"Space"	William Graham	Chris Carter	November 12, 1993	1X08	10.7
A mysterious force is sabotaging a space launch program which leads directly back to the commander of the team, who once claimed to have seen an alien in space while witnessing Mars from Earth orbit. The alien returns to Earth with him to torment him, and wreck his new space program.
10	10	"Fallen Angel"‡	Larry Shaw	Howard Gordon & Alex Gansa	November 19, 1993	1X09	8.8
Mulder puts the future of the X-Files in jeopardy when he heads to a UFO crash site being rapidly covered up by the military. He is arrested and while in jail he meets Max Fenig, a UFO nut whose NICAP group has followed Mulder's work on the X-Files. When Mulder is released, Scully urges him to return to Washington to face his superiors and try to save his job, but Mulder finds out that Fenig is more than meets the eye and ignores Scully to try to save him instead.
11	11	"Eve"	Fred Gerber	Kenneth Biller & Chris Brancato	December 10, 1993	1X10	10.4
When two fathers on opposite sides of the country are inexplicably murdered at exactly the same time in exactly the same way, Mulder and Scully find that their eight-year-old daughters are perfect twins and were created in order to continue The Litchfield Experiment, a eugenics project of the 1950s which produced cloned boys named Adam and girls named Eve who have heightened strength and intelligence, but are prone to psychotic behavior.
12	12	"Fire"	Larry Shaw	Chris Carter	December 17, 1993	1X11	11.1
Mulder investigates the deaths of British dignitaries at the behest of an old girlfriend from Oxford. Cecil L'Ively is a pyrokinetic: he has the ability to start fires with his mind, and he wants Sir Malcolm Marsden's wife.
13	13	"Beyond the Sea"	David Nutter	Glen Morgan & James Wong	January 7, 1994	1X12	10.8
A death row inmate named Luther Lee Boggs claims that he is psychic and can lead Mulder to a serial killer in exchange for a lesser sentence of life in prison. The agents' roles are reversed in this episode, with Mulder doubting Boggs's claim and Scully believing him after she is told that she can communicate through him with her recently deceased father.
14	14	"Gender Bender"	Rob Bowman	Larry Barber & Paul Barber	January 21, 1994	1X13	11.1
A series of identical sexual murders, where the killer appears to be both male and female, draw Mulder and Scully to an Amish-type community of people who may be of alien origin, leading to the discovery of a man who can change sex.
15	15	"Lazarus"	David Nutter	Alex Gansa & Howard Gordon	February 4, 1994	1X14	12.1
When FBI Agent Jack Willis and bank robber Warren Dupre are both shot at the same time during a robbery attempt, Dupre dies and Willis is resuscitated. When Willis rushes out of the hospital and begins acting strangely, Mulder concludes that Dupre's consciousness has been transferred to Willis's body.
16	16	"Young at Heart"	Michael Lange	Scott Kaufer and Chris Carter	February 11, 1994	1X15	11.5
A psychotic criminal from one of Mulder's past cases—John Barnett—is back to get revenge on Mulder for incarcerating him. Before Barnett's release, a renegade doctor had found a way to reverse the aging process—using Barnett as his test subject. Mulder and Scully rush to catch the now-unrecognizable youthful Barnett before he carries out his threat to kill all of Mulder's loved ones.
17	17	"E.B.E."‡	William Graham	Glen Morgan & James Wong	February 18, 1994	1X16	9.2
Mulder and Scully receive information from Deep Throat about a UFO that was shot down over Iraq and has been secretly transported to the US. However, Deep Throat then intentionally misleads the agents to prevent them from discovering the truth. The Lone Gunmen are introduced.
18	18	"Miracle Man"	Michael Lange	Chris Carter & Howard Gordon	March 18, 1994	1X17	11.6
Mulder and Scully travel to Tennessee to investigate the "Miracle Ministry" and its star attraction—a young man with the ability to heal people with his touch—when a person dies shortly after being healed.
19	19	"Shapes"	David Nutter	Marilyn Osborn	April 1, 1994	1X18	11.5
Mulder and Scully head to an Indian reservation in northwestern Montana to investigate a manslaughter case which Mulder believes may relate to the very first X-File ever created at the FBI, and its main subject: lycanthropy.
20	20	"Darkness Falls"	Joe Napolitano	Chris Carter	April 15, 1994	1X19	12.5
Mulder and Scully travel to a remote area of Washington State National Forest after an entire group of thirty loggers goes missing. They soon discover that an unseen force that was lying dormant has been awakened.
21	21	"Tooms"	David Nutter	Glen Morgan & James Wong	April 22, 1994	1X20	13.4
Tooms is released from the psychiatric sanitarium in which he was incarcerated for assaulting Scully—and he needs to kill once more to get the final liver which will allow him to hibernate for another thirty years. Mulder and Scully race against time to find evidence of his involvement in the past string of murders before Tooms disappears again. Assistant Director Walter Skinner appears for the first time.
22	22	"Born Again"	Jerrold Freedman	Howard Gordon & Alex Gansa	April 29, 1994	1X21	13.7
After a detective and his former partner die in unexplained circumstances, the accidents are linked to a little girl who witnessed both deaths and Mulder believes that she may be the reincarnation of a policeman murdered by his colleagues.
23	23	"Roland"	David Nutter	Chris Ruppenthal	May 6, 1994	1X22	12.5
Agents Mulder and Scully investigate a series of murders in Mahan Propulsion Laboratory as a team of scientists die one by one and the only suspect is a mentally handicapped cleaner named Roland.
24	24	"The Erlenmeyer Flask"‡	R. W. Goodwin	Chris Carter	May 13, 1994	1X23	14.0
A seemingly unrelated car chase leads Mulder and Scully to a scientific lab encompassing a secret which could provide proof of a government conspiracy.

== Reception ==
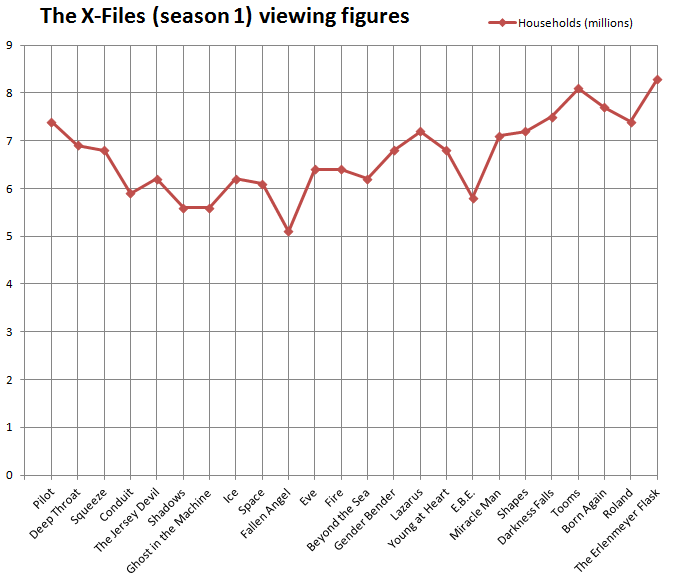
Nielsen household ratings for the first season

=== Ratings ===
From the outset, viewing figures for the series were good, with the initial broadcast of "Pilot" being watched by 7.4 million households, which constituted 15 percent of the viewing audience at the time. The series was broadcast directly after episodes of The Adventures of Brisco County, Jr., and saw a decline in viewing figures when that series began to falter. The season—and series as a whole—reached a low with "Fallen Angel", which was viewed by only 5.1 million households. However, after the episode aired, the numbers began to rise steadily once again, reaching a peak for the season with "The Erlenmeyer Flask", which was viewed by 8.3 million households, 16 percent of the available audience. At the conclusion of the 1993–94 television season, The X-Files ranked 105th out of 128 shows. The ratings were not spectacular, but the series had attracted enough fans to be classified as a "cult hit", particularly by Fox standards, and was subsequently renewed for a second season.

=== Reviews ===
Reviews for the first season were mostly positive, with the series being described as "the most paranoid, subversive show on TV", and the writing being called "fresh without being self-conscious, and the characters are involving. Series kicks off with drive and imagination, both innovative in recent TV". The season as a whole currently holds an 83% rating on review aggregator website Rotten Tomatoes, based on 35 reviews, with a critical consensus stating, "A serious approach to its premise helps establish The X-Files as a sci-fi procedural with a genuinely creepy twist – and a thrilling drama that avoids devolving into pure camp." On Metacritic, the season scored 70 out of 100, based on 14 reviews, indicating "Generally favorable reviews". Writing for IGN, Mike Miksch noted that "some of the episodes were at a level of excellence that still hasn't been matched since"; adding that the series has "become nearly as integral to pop culture today as any show in history". Bill Hunt of The Digital Bits gave the season an "A", stating "The X-Files is a show that dared to be different, and different it was". Hunt described the show's cinematography as "striking and noir-ish". Anna Johns, writing for TV Squad, called the season "phenomenal" and added that it contains "many terrific episodes".

Several episodes were widely praised, including "Squeeze", which has been called "profoundly creepy"; the "taut and briskly paced" Arctic-set "Ice"; and the "remarkably chilling" Scully-centered episode "Beyond the Sea". However, not all episodes of the season were as well received. Despite the costly production of "Space", the episode was derided as "decidedly unscary" and "a little tasteless" in its treatment of the Challenger disaster. "The Jersey Devil" was described as "pretty silly", whilst the plots for "Shadows", "Born Again", and "Roland" were panned for being much too similar to each other.

=== Accolades ===
The first season received two Primetime Emmy Award nominations, with one win. Composer Mark Snow was nominated for Outstanding Individual Achievement in Main Title Theme Music, while title designers Bruce Bryant, James Castle and Carol Johnsen won for Outstanding Individual Achievement in Graphic Design and Title Sequences.

== DVD release ==
The X-Files – The Complete First Season
Set details		Special features
24 episodes; 7-disc set; 1.33:1 aspect ratio; Subtitles: English, Spanish; English (Dolby 2.0 Surround)		"The Truth About Season One" documentary; Chris Carter talks about 12 episodes: "Pilot", "Deep Throat", "Squeeze", "Conduit", "Ice", "Fallen Angel", "Eve", "Beyond The Sea", "E.B.E", "Darkness Falls", "Tooms", and "The Erlenmeyer Flask"; Special effects clip from "Fallen Angel"; Deleted scene from "Pilot"; 11 "Behind-the-truth" spots from F/X; 47 promotional television spots; "Paranormal and Alien Abduction Trivia and Weblinks; Cross Reference of 24 Previews; DVD-ROM Games
Release dates
Region 1	Region 2	Region 4
May 9, 2000	November 6, 2000	November 22, 2000

== Bibliography ==
- Bush, Michelle (2008). Myth-X. Lulu. ISBN 978-1-4357-4688-6.
- Cantor, Paul A (2003). Gilligan Unbound: Pop Culture in the Age of Globalization. Rowman & Littlefield. ISBN 0-7425-0779-3.
- Delasara, Jan (2000). X-Files Confidential. PopLit, PopCult and The X-Files: A Critical Exploration. ISBN 0-7864-0789-1.
- Edwards, Ted (1996). X-Files Confidential. Little, Brown and Company. ISBN 0-316-21808-1.
- Gradnitzer, Louisa; Pittson, Todd (1999). X Marks the Spot: On Location with The X-Files. Arsenal Pulp Press. ISBN 1-55152-066-4.
- Lovece, Frank (1996). The X-Files Declassified. Citadel Press. ISBN 0-8065-1745-X.
- Lowry, Brian (1995). The Truth is Out There: The Official Guide to the X-Files. Harper Prism. ISBN 0-06-105330-9.
- Meisler, Andy (2000). The End and the Beginning: The Official Guide to the X-Files Volume 5. Harper Prism. ISBN 0-06-107595-7.
