= Space (The X-Files) =

- The X-Files episode
- Colonel Belt is possessed by the entity. The episode was derided by one critic for its "pretty decidedly unscary" graphics.
- Episode no.: Season 1 Episode 9
- Directed by: William Graham
- Written by: Chris Carter
- Production code: 1X08
- Original air date: November 12, 1993
- Running time: 46 minutes

Guest appearances
- Ed Lauter as Lieutenant Colonel Marcus Aurelius Belt; Susanna Thompson as Michelle Generoo

Episode chronology
← Previous "Ice"	Next → "Fallen Angel"
- The X-Files season 1

"Space" is the ninth episode of the first season of the American science fiction television series The X-Files, premiering on the Fox network on November 12, 1993. It was written by series creator Chris Carter, directed by William Graham, and featured guest appearances by Ed Lauter and Susanna Thompson. The episode is a "Monster-of-the-Week" story, unconnected to the series' wider mythology. "Space" earned a Nielsen household rating of 6.5, being watched by 6.1 million households in its initial broadcast, and received negative reviews from critics.

The show centers on FBI agents Fox Mulder (David Duchovny) and Dana Scully (Gillian Anderson) who work on cases linked to the paranormal, called X-Files. When investigating possible sabotage in NASA's Space Shuttle program, Mulder and Scully find that an astronaut who had been Mulder's childhood hero may be possessed by an extraterrestrial spirit.

Carter was inspired to write "Space" after reading about news of the "face on Mars"—an instance of pareidolia wherein a mound in the Cydonia region of Mars was taken to resemble a human face. The episode was conceived as a low budget bottle episode, due to several earlier episodes having exceeded their budgets. Although the episode made use of a significant amount of inexpensive stock footage from NASA, the construction of the Mission Control set was subject to cost overruns, eventually leading the episode to become the most expensive of the first season.

== Plot ==
In 1977, after the discovery of a face sculpted into the landscape of Mars, Lt. Col. Marcus Aurelius Belt (Ed Lauter), an astronaut, is plagued by flashbacks of an encounter with the disembodied face during a spacewalk. Sixteen years later, Fox Mulder (David Duchovny) and Dana Scully (Gillian Anderson) are approached by Michelle Generoo (Susanna Thompson), a communications commander for NASA's Mission Control. Generoo believes that someone within NASA is sabotaging launch attempts. A recent Space Shuttle liftoff was aborted seconds before commencement, and Generoo fears the next launch will be similarly compromised. She also has a personal interest, as her fiancé will be aboard the next mission.

Mulder and Scully travel to NASA and meet Belt, a childhood hero of Mulder's. Belt, who now manages the Space Shuttle program, dismisses the agents' concerns and states that nothing can possibly go wrong with the mission. He allows the agents to watch the successful launch from Mission Control. As the agents are leaving, however, Generoo informs them that contact has been lost with the shuttle in orbit. While driving back to NASA, she sees the face come at her through her windshield, causing her to crash her car. The agents manage to get her out of her overturned car and, despite being injured, she manages to get back to Mission Control.

The shuttle has moved into direct sunlight and Mission Control is unable to rotate it into a safe position, putting the astronauts' lives in danger. Generoo believes that the uplink is being sabotaged. Belt orders the uplink to be cut, allowing the astronauts to rotate the craft manually. Over the objections of Generoo and the agents, he orders the mission to proceed and lies to the press about its progress. Belt tells Mulder that the shuttle program may be cancelled if the mission is not completed successfully.

Belt returns home and has another flashback. As he lies in bed in agony, an astral presence leaves his body and flies out the window, heading into the sky. The astronauts then report hearing a thump outside the shuttle and begin to experience an oxygen leak. Belt fixes the situation but orders the mission to proceed. The payload is successfully deployed, but an astronaut reports seeing a ghostlike entity outside the shuttle. Meanwhile, the agents examine NASA records and find evidence that Belt played a role in other failed missions, including the Challenger disaster.

Belt behaves irrationally and collapses screaming as he hears mention of the entity from the astronauts. Paramedics are called to attend to him and find him cowering under his desk, whimpering and begging for help. Before Belt is taken away, he tells the agents that the shuttle will not survive reentry due to sabotage by "the face", which has possessed his body since the spacewalk. At his urging, they alert the shuttle to change its trajectory and are just able to land it successfully.

In the hospital, Belt continues to wrestle with the presence, telling Mulder he wasn't responsible but also couldn't stop it, as "it came to me, it lives in me". Eventually, in a last struggle with the re-possessing entity, he leaps from the window to his death–experiencing a flashback to his last space mission as he falls. Before his funeral, Mulder theorizes that, while Belt was compelled to sabotage the launches by the entity possessing him, he was also the one who sent Generoo the evidence of what was taking place. He lauds Belt's final sacrifice, stating that in the end he gave his life for the mission, as befits a true astronaut.

== Production ==
"Space" was conceived as a low-budget bottle episode, due to several earlier episodes having exceeded their budgets. Series creator Chris Carter was inspired to write the episode after reading about news of the "face on Mars"—an instance of pareidolia wherein a mound in the Cydonia region of Mars was taken to resemble a human face. Although the episode made use of a significant amount of inexpensive stock footage from NASA, the construction of the Mission Control set was subject to cost overruns, eventually leading the episode to become the most expensive of the first season. Carter blames this on the infeasibility of showing the astronauts in the stricken shuttle, requiring additional exposition to explain their situation—something he found he could not manage "on an eight-day television budget". Carter also claims that the episode suffered from being filmed shortly after the pilot episode was broadcast, with the crew overwhelmed by the input, noting that "everything was happening at once".

Several scenes in the episode were filmed at a Canadian Airlines operations center in Richmond, British Columbia. The crew were given permission by the airline to use their flight simulators, leading to the production being delayed while everyone had a turn simulating flights over Canada. The problematic Mission Control set was constructed and filmed at an amphitheater in Vancouver, whose sloping surfaces helped to suggest computer terminals without needing much construction, although false computer monitors were added for shots when they would be in view.

Guest star Ed Lauter had previously worked with the episode's director, William A. Graham, on the film Guyana Tragedy: The Story of Jim Jones. On his role in the episode, Lauter has stated, "I don’t really have a lot to say about that, except I thought I did a nice job, and that it was nice working up there in Vancouver with David Duchovny and Gillian Anderson".

== Broadcast and reception ==
"Space" premiered on the Fox network on November 12, 1993. The episode earned a Nielsen household rating of 6.5 with an 11 share, meaning that roughly 6.5 percent of all television-equipped households, and 11 percent of households watching TV, were tuned in to the episode. A total of 6.1 million households watched this episode during its original airing.

The episode—reportedly Carter's least favorite—was very poorly received. Frank Lovece, in his books The X-Files Declassified, called it "perhaps the series' dullest, least suspenseful episode", citing the spectral antagonist's "highly unclear motivations". Keith Phipps, writing for The A.V. Club, reviewed the episode negatively, rating it a D+. He felt that the episode's special effects were "pretty decidedly unscary", and that the episode's premise was confusing and "a little tasteless" in its treatment of the Challenger disaster. In a retrospective of the first season in Entertainment Weekly the episode was similarly derided, being rated a D− and described as "one dead hour". Matt Haigh, writing for Den of Geek, reviewed the episode negatively, feeling that it was "nothing much to write home about", and that the episode's antagonist was "distinctly unimpressive, lacking any true sense of menace or intrigue".

== Notes ==
=== References ===
- Gradnitzer, Louisa; Pittson, Todd (1999). X Marks the Spot: On Location with The X-Files. Arsenal Pulp Press. ISBN 1-55152-066-4.
- Lovece, Frank (1996). The X-Files Declassified. Citadel Press. ISBN 0-8065-1745-X.
- Lowry, Brian (1995). The Truth is Out There: The Official Guide to the X-Files. Harper Prism. ISBN 0-06-105330-9.
