= Deep Throat (The X-Files) =

Character in The X-Files

- The X-Files character
- Deep Throat's first appearance in the series
- First appearance: "Deep Throat"
- Last appearance: "The Sixth Extinction II: Amor Fati"
- Created by: Chris Carter
- Portrayed by: Jerry Hardin

In-universe information
- Full name: Ronald Pakula
- Gender: Male
- Occupation: Syndicate Member
- Affiliated with: Men in Black; Federal Bureau of Investigation, The X-Files
- Duration: 1993–1996, 1999

Deep Throat is a fictional character on the American science fiction television series The X-Files. He serves as an informant, leaking information to FBI Special Agent Fox Mulder to aid Mulder's investigation of paranormal cases, dubbed X-Files. Introduced in the series' second episode, also named "Deep Throat", the character was killed off during the first season finale "The Erlenmeyer Flask"; however, he later made several appearances in flashbacks and visions. In the season 11 episode "This", his real name is ostensibly revealed to be Ronald Pakula.

The character of Deep Throat was portrayed by Jerry Hardin in all his appearances. After the character was killed, Steven Williams was introduced in the second season episode "The Host" to portray his successor, X. The creation of Deep Throat was inspired by the historical Deep Throat, Mark Felt, who leaked information on the Watergate scandal, and by Donald Sutherland's character X in the film JFK.

== Conceptual history ==
Series creator Chris Carter has stated that the character of Deep Throat was "of course" inspired by the historical Deep Throat. The real Deep Throat was an informant leaking information on the FBI's investigation of the Watergate scandal to journalists Carl Bernstein and Bob Woodward. After the conclusion of The X-Files, this Deep Throat was later revealed to be FBI Associate Director Mark Felt. Also cited as an influence on the fictional Deep Throat was X, the character portrayed by Donald Sutherland in the 1991 Oliver Stone film JFK. In the film, Sutherland's X reveals information about the possibility that the assassination of John F. Kennedy was orchestrated by elements within the American government. Carter felt he needed to create a character who would bridge the gap between FBI agents Fox Mulder (David Duchovny) and Dana Scully (Gillian Anderson) and the shadowy conspirators who were working against them; he conceived of a character "who works in some level of government that we have no idea exists".

Carter was drawn to actor Jerry Hardin after seeing him in 1993's The Firm. Hardin believed his initial appearance would be a one-time role, although he soon found himself regularly commuting to the series' Vancouver filming location on short notice. Producer Howard Gordon has spoken of the elusiveness of the character's allegiances, stating that during production, it was often left ambiguous whether he was "ally or foe". After filming the character's death in the first season finale, "The Erlenmeyer Flask", Hardin was toasted with champagne, and told by Carter that "no one ever really dies on X-Files". As such, Hardin made several more appearances as Deep Throat after this—seen in visions in the third season's "The Blessing Way" and the seventh season's "The Sixth Extinction II: Amor Fati", in flashbacks in the fourth season's "Musings of a Cigarette Smoking Man", and as one of the guises assumed by a shapeshifting alien in the third season's finale, "Talitha Cumi".

== Character arc ==
During the first season of The X-Files, Deep Throat provided Mulder and Scully with information they would have been otherwise unable to obtain. As a member of the then-unseen Syndicate, he was in a position to know a great deal of information. Deep Throat felt that the truth the Syndicate kept secret from the public needed to be known, and believed Mulder to be the one person capable of exposing this knowledge. However, in "E.B.E." Deep Throat provided Mulder with false information in order to divert him, later explaining that he believed the public was just not ready to know some truths.

During the Vietnam War, Deep Throat worked for the Central Intelligence Agency. When a UFO was shot down over Hanoi by US Marines, the surviving extraterrestrial was brought to Deep Throat, who executed it (depicted in flashback for the fourth season episode "Musings of a Cigarette Smoking Man"). He later claimed that assisting Mulder was his way of atoning for his actions. He also stated that he was "a participant in some of the most insidious lies and witness to deeds that no crazed man could imagine".

In the first season finale of The X-Files, "The Erlenmeyer Flask", Mulder was taken hostage by a group of Men in Black operatives, following his investigation into an alien-human hybrid program. Fearing for Mulder's life, Deep Throat helped Scully gain access to a high containment facility, where she managed to secretly remove a cryogenically-preserved alien fetus for use as collateral in saving Mulder. In the subsequent meeting between the operatives and Deep Throat, he was gunned down by an assassin, the Crew Cut Man. Deep Throat was buried at the Arlington National Cemetery. The character later appeared in dreams and visions experienced by Mulder during his recuperation on a Navajo reservation, and again years later while being experimented on by The Smoking Man.

== Reception ==
The character of Deep Throat has been well received by critics and fans. Entertainment Weekly described Hardin's performance as "world-weary and heavyhearted", and listed his appearance in the character's eponymous début episode as the 37th greatest television moment of the 1990s. However, they felt at times that his presence in episodes such as "Ghost in the Machine" seemed "gratuitous". Reviewing the character's début episode, the San Jose Mercury News called Deep Throat "the most interesting new character on television". Chris Carter has stated that Hardin's performance gave the series an element of "believability" that it needed; and felt that the episode "E.B.E." was a great opportunity to expand the character's role. Writing for The A.V. Club, Zack Handlen called Deep Throat's death "a shocking moment, even when you know it's coming", praising the "desperation" evident in Hardin's performance, although lamenting the "curse of continuity" that led to the character being quickly replaced with Steven Williams' X. Ben Rawson-Jones, writing for Digital Spy, felt that Deep Throat's tenure on The X-Files was "arguably the show's peak", and praised Hardin's acting in the role. Brian Lowry, in his book The Truth Is Out There, has noted that the character "helped establish a tone and undercurrent of gravity on The X-Files that was to provide the spine of the series". A.J. Black, writing on The Companion, about the influence of the Watergate scandal on The X-Files, observes: "While Deep Throat’s involvement in The X-Files, ostensibly easy to consider as a narrative cheat for Mulder’s investigations, in truth serves to further enhance the series’ deeper connections to the conspiratorial history of the 1970s."

== Footnotes ==
=== References ===
- Woodward, Bob; Bernstein, Carl (1974). All the President's Men. Simon & Schuster. ISBN 0-684-86355-3.
- Edwards, Ted (1996). X-Files Confidential. Little, Brown and Company. ISBN 0-316-21808-1.
- Lovece, Frank (1996). The X-Files Declassified. Citadel Press. ISBN 0-8065-1745-X.
- Lowry, Brian (1995). The Truth is Out There: The Official Guide to the X-Files. Harper Prism. ISBN 0-06-105330-9.
