= Jan D'Arcy =

American actress

Jan Therese D'Arcy is an American television and film actress born on June 18, 1939, in Oneida, New York, with a career spanning almost five decades. She is best known for playing Sylvia Horne in Twin Peaks, and her roles in many other television series and movies including The X-Files and Alive.

== Career ==
=== Television series ===
==== Twin Peaks ====
She is best known for playing Sylvia Horne in Twin Peaks, appearing in the hit cult original 1990 series on ABC. She was in four significant episodes, including the very first one, the Pilot, and the then final episode, both key episodes directed by David Lynch.

She was also due to appear in the 1992 movie, Twin Peaks: Fire Walk With Me, with her character appearing in the original script, but did not as Richard Beymer - who played her character's husband, Benjamin Horne - and Sherilyn Fenn - who portrayed her on-screen daughter, Audrey Horne - chose not to return and the scenes featuring the Horne Family were written out. Many databases add the movie to her list of roles as "scenes deleted", but she didn't film any.

Twenty-five years later, she returned to the role in the Showtime 2017 revival, Twin Peaks: The Return, appearing in two episodes.

==== The X-Files and other roles ====
She also played Judge Kann in the Tooms episode of The X-Files and had roles in The Outer Limits, M.A.N.T.I.S, Arrow, and Highlander (as Betty Bannen).

Her TV career also includes The Commish, L.A. Law, 21 Jump Street, Jake and the Fatman, Hot Pursuit, and Wiseguy.

=== Films ===
She has appeared in several made-for-TV films, including: Better Off Dead, No Child of Mine, The Other Mother, The Danger of Love, High Stakes, and Relic.

She has also been in many feature films. Her debut role was in the Stockard Channing movie, Sweet Revenge (1976). She was in Why Would I Lie? (1980), the major true story movie Alive (1993), Keoni Waxman's Countdown (1996), and will be in Allen Wolf's upcoming movie The Sound of Violet, which is due to be released in 2022.

== Personal life ==
She has five children. She has a BA from Catholic University America (1960) and an MA from University of California at Los Angeles (1961).
