= Jerry Hardin =

American actor

- Born: November 20, 1929 (age 96); Dallas, Texas, United States
- Education: Southwestern University; Royal Academy of Dramatic Art
- Years active: 1958–2014
- Spouse: Diane Hardin (m. 1959)
- Children: 2, including Melora
- Relatives: Gildart Jackson (son-in-law)

Jerry Hardin (born November 20, 1929) is an American actor. Hardin has appeared in film and television roles, including Deep Throat in The X-Files. He has guest starred in Star Trek: The Next Generation and Star Trek: Voyager. He amassed over 100 appearances in film and television and over 75 theatrical credits. They include The Rockford Files, Roots: The Gift, The Golden Girls, Sliders, Cujo (1983), Big Trouble in Little China (1986), Wanted: Dead or Alive (1987), Little Nikita (1988), The Firm (1993).

== Early life and education ==
Hardin was born in Dallas, Texas on November 20, 1929. His father was a rancher, and Jerry spent his youth actively involved with his local church and performing in school plays. He attended Southwestern University in Georgetown, Texas, on a scholarship before going on to study at London's Royal Academy of Dramatic Art, graduating with an Acting (RADA Diploma) in 1953. He spent several years in London before returning to the United States to begin acting in New York, performing in regional theatre for twelve years.

== Career ==
Hardin began acting on television in the 1950s, mostly in character roles. He amassed over 100 appearances by the early 1990s, in addition to more than 75 theatrical credits by the early 1960s. His television appearances include roles in the 1976 western series Sara, The Rockford Files, Roots: The Gift, Miami Vice, Family Ties, The Golden Girls, World War III, Star Trek: The Next Generation, Star Trek: Voyager, JAG, Sliders, and Lois & Clark: The New Adventures of Superman. Hardin appeared in such films as Thunder Road (1958), Our Time (1974), Wolf Lake (1978), Chilly Scenes of Winter (1979), 1941 (1979), Reds (1981), Missing (1982), Tempest (1982), Honkytonk Man (1982), Cujo (1983), Mass Appeal (1984), Warning Sign (1985), Big Trouble in Little China (1986), Let's Get Harry (1986), Wanted: Dead or Alive (1987), Little Nikita (1988), The Milagro Beanfield War (1988), Blaze (1989), The Hot Spot (1990), The Firm (1993).

Hardin's appearance in Roots: The Gift is notable because he was one of five Star Trek actors who had a "preunion" in this production. LeVar Burton (Geordi La Forge in Star Trek: The Next Generation), Avery Brooks (Benjamin Sisko in Star Trek: Deep Space Nine), Kate Mulgrew and Tim Russ (Kathryn Janeway and Tuvok in Star Trek: Voyager) were also in the cast. While the others played major Star Trek characters, Hardin had notable guest roles: Radue in Star Trek: The Next Generation "When the Bough Breaks", Samuel Clemens in Star Trek: The Next Generation "Time's Arrow", and Neria in Star Trek: Voyager "Emanations".

=== Deep Throat ===
His role in 1993's The Firm won Hardin the attention of television writer Chris Carter, who cast him in the recurring role of Deep Throat in the series The X-Files. Hardin believed his initial appearance in the second episode of the first season, airing on September 17, 1993, would be a one-time role, but he soon found himself regularly commuting to the series' Vancouver filming location on short notice. After filming the character's death in the first season finale, "The Erlenmeyer Flask", Hardin was toasted with champagne, and told by Carter that "no one ever really dies on X-Files". As such, Hardin made several more appearances as Deep Throat after this, seen in visions in the third season's "The Blessing Way" and the seventh season's "The Sixth Extinction II: Amor Fati", in flashbacks in the fourth season's "Musings of a Cigarette Smoking Man", and as one of the guises assumed by a shapeshifting alien in the third season's finale, "Talitha Cumi".

== Personal life ==
Hardin is married, with two children. His wife Diane (née Hill) is an acting coach. Despite Hardin's claim that he "did my best to discourage my own children from doing it", his daughter Melora Hardin is also an actress, known for roles as Trudy Monk in Monk and Jan Levinson in The Office. His son worked for television network NBC.

== Footnotes/references ==
- Edwards, Ted (1996). X-Files Confidential. Little, Brown and Company. ISBN 0-316-21808-1.
- Lovece, Frank (1996). The X-Files Declassified. Citadel Press. ISBN 0-8065-1745-X.
- Lowry, Brian (1995). The Truth Is Out There: The Official Guide to the X-Files. Harper Prism. ISBN 0-06-105330-9.
