= Tooms =

- The X-Files episode
- Episode no.: Season 1 Episode 21
- Directed by: David Nutter
- Written by: Glen Morgan; James Wong
- Production code: 1X20
- Original air date: April 22, 1994
- Running time: 45 minutes

Guest appearances
- Doug Hutchison as Eugene Victor Tooms; Paul Ben-Victor as Dr. Aaron Monte; Mitch Pileggi as Walter Skinner; Henry Beckman as Detective Frank Briggs; Jan D'Arcy as Judge Kann; William B. Davis as the Smoking Man

Episode chronology
← Previous "Darkness Falls"	Next → "Born Again"
- The X-Files season 1

"Tooms" is the twenty-first episode of the first season of the American science fiction television series The X-Files, premiering on the Fox network on April 22, 1994. It was written by Glen Morgan and James Wong, and directed by David Nutter. The episode featured Mitch Pileggi's first appearance as Assistant Director Walter Skinner and saw Doug Hutchison and William B. Davis reprise their roles as Eugene Victor Tooms and the Cigarette Smoking Man, respectively. "Tooms" received positive reviews from critics, and it earned a Nielsen household rating of 8.6, being watched by 8.1 million households in its initial broadcast.

The show centers on FBI agents Fox Mulder (David Duchovny) and Dana Scully (Gillian Anderson) who work on cases linked to the paranormal, called X-Files. When mutant serial killer Eugene Tooms, last seen in "Squeeze", is released from prison, Mulder and Scully try to stop him from resuming his killing spree. Tooms, in turn, sets out to frame Mulder for assault before the agent can apprehend him.

After seeing men working on an open escalator in a mall around Christmas time, Morgan decided to revisit the character of Tooms. "Tooms" introduced the character of Walter Skinner, although this would be his only appearance in the first season. The character was conceived as playing against the stereotypical bureaucratic "paper-pusher", being instead someone more "quietly dynamic".

== Plot ==
After the events of "Squeeze", Eugene Victor Tooms has been placed in a Baltimore sanatorium. He attempts to escape by squeezing his arm through the food slot of his cell door. He is forced to abort when he is visited by his psychologist, Dr. Aaron Monte, who tells him that he is ready to be released into society.

Dana Scully is called before FBI Assistant Director Walter Skinner, who is accompanied by The Smoking Man. Despite the success of the X-Files investigations, Skinner criticizes their unconventionalism and wants both Scully and Fox Mulder to do by-the-book work. Later, the agents attend a release hearing for Tooms, where Monte claims that Tooms' attack on Scully was due to being falsely accused of murder. Mulder tries to point out the evidence of Tooms' crimes and unusual physiology but is ignored by the hearing's panel. Tooms is released into the care of an elderly couple and is ordered to continue his treatment with Dr. Monte.

Scully meets with Frank Briggs, the retired detective who investigated Tooms' 1933 murders. Briggs claims that the body of one of the victims from that spree was never discovered. He and Scully visit a chemical plant where a piece of the victim's liver was found, ultimately discovering a skeleton encased in concrete. A researcher examining the skeleton identifies it as the missing victim from 1933. However, there seems to be no substantial evidence proving that Tooms was the murderer.

Meanwhile, Mulder harasses Tooms at work as he stalks a would-be victim. Later that night, Mulder follows him when he tries to break into a couple's house. Tooms flees without attacking anyone. Scully relieves Mulder, who is watching Tooms' new residence; they are unaware that Tooms is hiding in the trunk of Mulder's car. He manages to break into Mulder's apartment, where he injures himself and imprints Mulder's shoe print on his face. Tooms' frameup leads the police to question Mulder and Skinner to forbid him from contacting Tooms.

Further research on the skeleton reveals bite marks matching Tooms' teeth. When the old couple watching Tooms leave their home, he is visited by Monte. Tooms kills him and consumes the final liver he needs to begin his thirty-year hibernation. After discovering Monte's body and defying Skinner's orders, Mulder and Scully head to the site of Tooms' former apartment building, which has been demolished and replaced with a shopping mall. Inside, Mulder crawls below an escalator and finds Tooms' nest. Tooms bursts out, covered in bile, and pursues Mulder, who makes it to the surface and activates the escalator, trapping and killing Tooms.

Skinner reads Scully's final report on the Tooms case and asks the Smoking Man if he believes it, to which he replies, "Of course I do." Outside, Scully finds Mulder, who is observing a caterpillar's cocoon. Mulder predicts that change is coming to the X-Files.

== Production ==
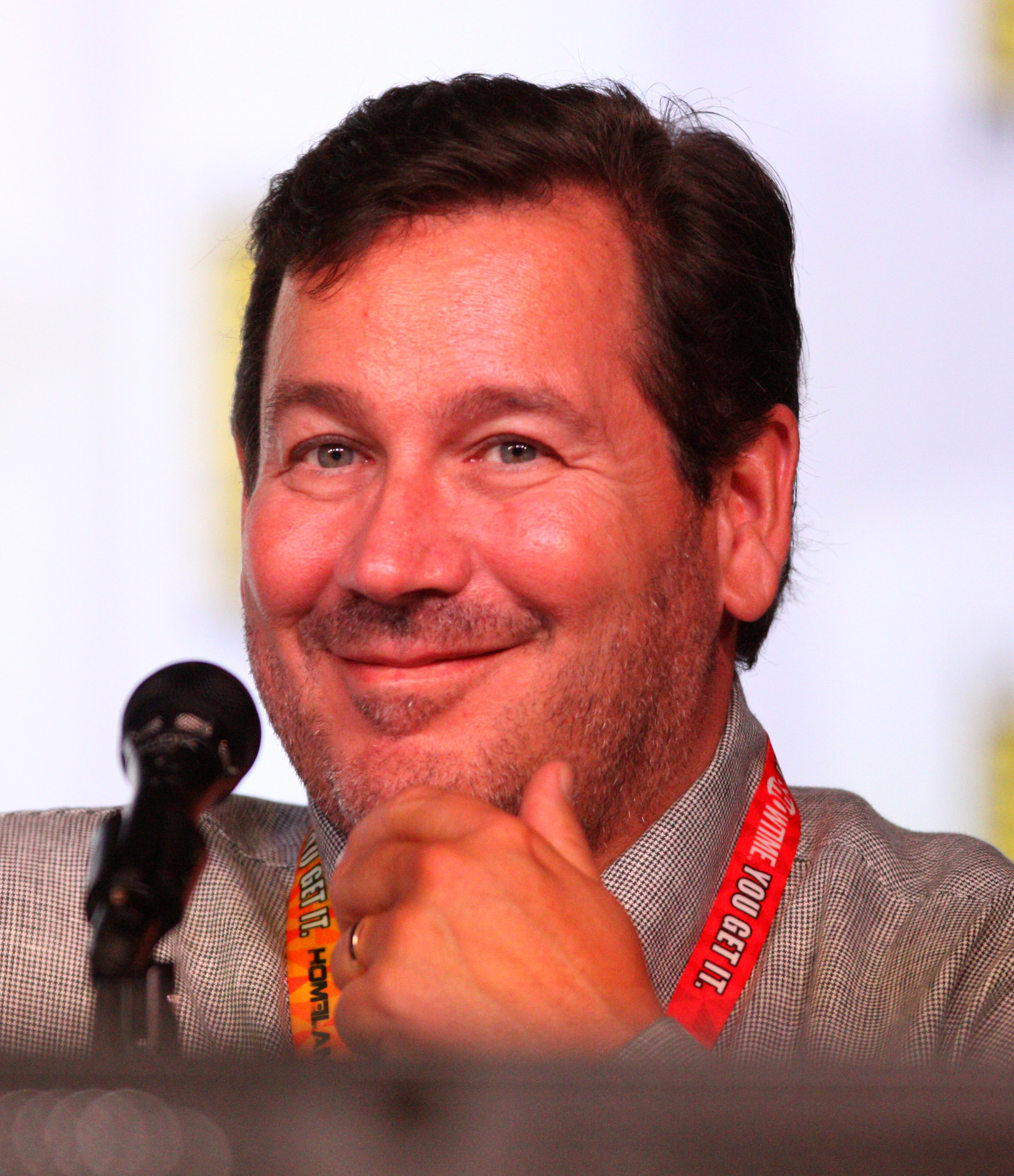
"Tooms" was directed by David Nutter, who the crew felt was the "best" director working on The X-Files.

Devising a sequel to "Squeeze" posed a challenge for writers Glen Morgan and James Wong, who had never written a follow-up to any of their work previously. Morgan felt that the primary difficulty was in moving the story forward while still leaving room to recap what had happened previously for the benefit of viewers who had not seen the first episode; this led to the use of the courtroom scene as a means to repeat any necessary information. Morgan also felt that Harry Longstreet, the initial director for "Squeeze", had been "a problem" and a second episode allowed for the use of scenes which Longstreet had failed to film for the earlier episode. To this end, the episode was helmed by David Nutter, who series creator Chris Carter considered the "best" director working on the series.

Morgan was inspired to write this episode after seeing men working on an open escalator in a mall around Christmas time. He thought of the scare factor from a creature living underneath the escalator and felt Tooms would be the perfect choice for the creature. Tooms was the first villain in the show's history to make an appearance in a second episode. It was actor Doug Hutchison's idea to play Tooms nude during the escalator sequence, a decision which Carter felt "caused a little discomfort", but that "actually added to the scene". The bile-like substance coating Tooms and his nest was actually a yellow piping gel, which the cast found would stick to their skin and pull out hair upon removal. Tooms framing Mulder for assault seems to have been inspired by a similar plot point in the film Dirty Harry (1971).

"Tooms" introduced the character of Walter Skinner, although this would be his only appearance in the first season. The character had been conceived as playing against the stereotypical bureaucratic "paper-pusher", being instead someone more "quietly dynamic". Actor Mitch Pileggi had auditioned unsuccessfully for several other parts on the series before being cast as Skinner. At first, the fact that he was asked back to audition for the role had puzzled him, until he discovered the reason he had not been cast for the previous parts: Carter had been unable to imagine Pileggi as any of those characters, due to the fact that the actor had been shaving his head. When Pileggi attended the audition for Skinner, he had been in a grumpy mood and had allowed his small amount of hair to grow back. Pileggi's attitude fit well with the character of Skinner, causing Carter to assume that the actor was only pretending to be grumpy. After successfully auditioning for the role, Pileggi thought he had been lucky that he had not been cast in one of the earlier roles, as he believed he would have appeared in only a single episode and would have missed the opportunity to play the recurring role of Skinner.

The episode's climactic scene in the shopping mall where Tooms had made his nest was filmed in City Square Shopping Centre, Vancouver. Shooting at the location required the permission of every store owner on the premises, and care was taken to ensure that the stage blood used for the escalator scene did not seep into the escalator's motor to avoid possible damage. "Tooms" includes the Smoking Man's first line of dialogue in the series, and his only lines of the first season. Carter was initially unsure that the character would ever receive any dialogue, feeling that he would seem "more forbidding" if he remained silent. However, he described actor William B. Davis as "an extremely competent actor", noting the character's increasing popularity.

== Reception ==
"Tooms" premiered on the Fox network on April 22, 1994. This episode earned a Nielsen rating of 8.6, with a 15 share, meaning that roughly 8.6 percent of all television-equipped households, and 15 percent of households watching television, were tuned in to the episode. It was viewed by 8.1 million households.

In a retrospective of the first season in Entertainment Weekly, "Tooms" was rated an A, with Hutchison's appearance being noted as "another sublimely slimy performance", while Pileggi's performance was said to have an "engagingly steely presence". Zack Handlen, writing for The A.V. Club, called the episode "a richly rewarding one", finding the interaction between the characters of Mulder and Scully to have been a highlight of the episode. However, Handlen felt that some of the episode's plot development was ultimately needless, and found the motives of several characters to have been unexplained and baffling. Matt Haigh, writing for Den of Geek, felt that the plot thread of Tooms framing Mulder for assault "never really amounts to much", though he felt that the episode showed Tooms to be a creepier villain than his previous appearance in "Squeeze". Robert Shearman and Lars Pearson, in their book Wanting to Believe: A Critical Guide to The X-Files, Millennium & The Lone Gunmen, rated the episode four-and-a-half stars out of five, finding it to be a better instalment than "Squeeze". Shearman felt that the episode featured very little plotting, consisting simply of "a series of set pieces", but considered its wit and character development to adequately compensate for this.

The character of Eugene Tooms has also attracted positive criticism. Author Neil Gaiman listed Tooms as one of his favourite monsters in a guest column for Entertainment Weekly's 1,000th issue; while UGO Networks listed the character as one of their "Best TV Serial Killers", describing Hutchison's acting as "uber-creepy". Writing for Den of Geek, John Moore listed Eugene Tooms as his "Top 10 X-Files Baddies", noting that the popularity of both "Squeeze" and "Tooms" proved to be "largely responsible for shifting the emphasis of the show" away from dwelling solely on alien conspiracy-based mythology episodes.

== Footnotes ==
=== References ===
- Edwards, Ted (1996). X-Files Confidential. Little, Brown and Company. ISBN 0-316-21808-1.
- Gradnitzer, Louisa; Pittson, Todd (1999). X Marks the Spot: On Location with The X-Files. Arsenal Pulp Press. ISBN 1-55152-066-4.
- Lovece, Frank (1996). The X-Files Declassified. Citadel Press. ISBN 0-8065-1745-X.
- Lowry, Brian (1995). The Truth is Out There: The Official Guide to the X-Files. Harper Prism. ISBN 0-06-105330-9.
- Shearman, Robert; Pearson, Lars (2009). Wanting to Believe: A Critical Guide to The X-Files, Millennium & The Lone Gunmen. Mad Norwegian Press. ISBN 978-0-9759446-9-1.
