= Ellen Steiber =

American novelist

Ellen Steiber is an American novelist and author of books for young readers, including some based on single episodes of The X-Files and Full House series.

== Background ==
Steiber was raised in Newark and West Orange, New Jersey. She went to Carnegie Mellon University in Pittsburgh, Pennsylvania. When she finished college at Carnegie, Steiber moved to New York City where she worked for a Japanese trading company. She worked there for a couple years and eventually became a children's book writer.

Through the 1980s, Steiber lived in New York City. During this time period, she studied karate and had a wide social circle of artists and writers. Then in 1991, her lifelong dream of moving to the southwest was finally fulfilled. Ellen now lives in Tucson, Arizona with Doug, her partner.

Steiber's interests include: folk music, folklore, Mexican culture and border arts, classic children book illustrations, poetry, and many different types of fiction books.
