= The X-Files literature =

Literature based on The X-Files

During the run of the TV series The X-Files, many books based on it were released, written, including novels based on episodes, a series of comic books from Topps Comics, and many "official" and "unauthorized" non-fiction books.

Some of the novels, which were published in both hardcover and trade paperback editions, came out as audiobooks read by several of the series' stars, including Gillian Anderson (Ground Zero), John Neville (Fight the Future), Bruce Harwood (Skin) and Mitch Pileggi (Antibodies and Ruins).

Apart from the novels, in 2016 first official The X-Files coloring book was released by IDW Publishing.

== The X-Files fiction ==
Apart from the following series of books, there has also been a Fight the Future book based on The X Files Movie, written by Elizabeth Hand, as well as The X-Files: I Want to Believe by Max Allan Collins and The X-Files: Perihelion by Claudia Gray.

=== Juvenile Series (Middle Grade) ===
- X Marks the Spot by Les Martin (Pilot)
- Darkness Falls by Les Martin (Darkness Falls)
- Tiger, Tiger!, by Les Martin (Fearful Symmetry)
- Squeeze by Ellen Steiber (Squeeze)
- Humbug by Les Martin (Humbug)
- Shapes by Ellen Steiber (Shapes)
- Fear by Les Martin (Blood)
- Voltage by Easton Royce (D.P.O.)
- E.B.E by Les Martin and Easton Royce (E.B.E)
- Die Bug, Die! by Les Martin (War of the Coprophages)
- Ghost in the Machine by Les Martin (Ghost in the Machine)

=== Young Adults Series ===
- The Calusari by Garth Nix (The Calusari)
- Eve by Ellen Steiber (Eve)
- Bad Sign by Easton Royce (Syzygy)
- Our Town by Eric Elfman (Our Town)
- Empathy by Ellen Steiber (Oubliette)
- Fresh Bones by Les Martin (Fresh Bones)
- Control by Everett Owens (Pusher)
- The Host by Les Martin (The Host)
- Hungry Ghosts by Ellen Steiber (Hell Money)
- Dark Matter by Easton Royce (Soft Light)
- Howlers by Everett Owens (Unruhe)
- Grotesque by Ellen Steiber (Grotesque)
- Quarantine by Les Martin (F. Emasculata)
- Regeneration by Everett Owens (Leonard Betts)
- Haunted by Ellen Steiber (Shadows)
- Miracle Man by Terry Bisson (Miracle Man)

=== Third Series ===
- Ascension by Quentin Thomas (Duane Barry/Ascension/One Breath)
- Hunter by Charles L. Grant (Colony/End Game)

=== Novels ===
1. Goblins by Charles L. Grant (1994)
2. Whirlwind by Charles L. Grant (1995)
3. Ground Zero by Kevin J. Anderson (1995)
4. Ruins by Kevin J. Anderson (1996)
5. Antibodies by Kevin J. Anderson (1997)
6. Skin by Ben Mezrich (1999)
7. Perihelion by Claudia Gray (2025)

==== Film Novelizations ====
- Fight the Future by Elizabeth Hand (1998)
- The X-Files: I Want to Believe by Max Allan Collins (2008)

==== The X-Files Origins ====
1. Agent of Chaos by Kami Garcia (2017)
2. Devil's Advocate by Jonathan Maberry (2017)

=== Short Story Anthologies ===
- The X-Files: Trust No One, edited by Jonathan Maberry. ISBN 978-1-63140-278-4. 2015.
  - Includes stories by Aaron S. Rosenberg, Brian Keene, Gayle Lynds and John Sheldon, Gini Koch, Heather Graham, Jonathan Maberry, Keith R.A. DeCandido, Kevin J. Anderson, Max Allan Collins, Paul Crilley, Paul Shipper, Peter Clines, Ray Garton, Stefan Petrucha, Tim Lebbon, Timothy Deal, W.D. Gagliani and David Benton.
- The X-Files: The Truth Is Out There, edited by Jonathan Maberry. 2016.
  - Includes stories by Rachel Caine, Hank Philippi Ryan, Kelley Armstrong, Kami Garcia, Greg Cox and others.
- The X-Files: Secret Agendas, edited by Jonathan Maberry. 2016.
  - Includes stories by Jim Beard, Joh Gilstrap, Lauren A. Forry, Weston Ochse, Yvonne Navarro, Jade Shames, Andy Mangels, Lois Gresh, Jeff Mariotte & Marsheila Mariotte, Joe Harris, Bryan Thomas Schmidt & Kate Corcino, Ryan Cady, George Ivanoff, Nancy Holder and Lucy A. Snyder.

=== Comic books (trade-paperback collections) ===
- The X Files Collection: Seven Stories from the Best-Selling Topps Comics Series by Stefan Petrucha, Charles Adlard, Miran Kim (Berkley Publishing, 1996) ISBN 1-883313-10-4,
- The X-Files, Vol. 1 by Stefan Petrucha, Miran Kim, Charles Adlard (Checker Book Publishing Group, 2005) ISBN 1-933160-02-0,
- The X-Files Season 10 - series of official continuation comic books,
- The X-Files Season 11 - series of official continuation comic books,
- Millennium (2015 comic book) - official The X-Files and Millennium crossover,
- The X-Files 2016 - series of official continuation comic books,
- The X-Files Classics - series of comic books,
- The X-Files: Year Zero - series of comic books,
- The X-Files Deviations - series of comic books, Issue 1 released March 1st 2017
- The X-Files X-Mas Special - series of comic books,
- The X-Files: Conspiracy,
- The X-Files / 30 Days of Night crossover.
- The X-Files: Origins
- The X-Files: Case Files

== Non-fiction books ==
- The X-Files Declassified: The Unauthorized Guide by Frank Lovece (Carol Publishing, 1996) ISBN 0-8065-1745-X
- The Unauthorized X-Cyclopedia: The Definitive Reference Guide to The X-Files by James Hatfield and George "Doc" Burt (Kensington, reissued 1997) Reissue ISBN 1-57566-233-7
- X-Treme Possibilities: A Comprehensively Expanded Rummage Through Five Years of The X-Files by Paul Cornell, Martin Day, Keith Topping (Virgin Publishing, reissued 1998) Reissue ISBN 0-7535-0228-3
- The Truth Is Out There: The Official Guide to The X-Files, Vol. 1 by Brian Lowry and Chris Carter, research by Sarah Stegall (Perennial Currents, 1995) ISBN 0-06-105330-9
- Trust No One: The Official Guide to The X-Files, Vol. 2 by Brian Lowry and Chris Carter, research by Sarah Stegall (HarperEntertainment, 1996) ISBN 0-06-105353-8
- I Want to Believe: The Official Guide to The X-Files, Vol. 3 by Andy Meisler and Chris Carter, research by Sarah Stegall (Harper Paperbacks, 1998) ISBN 0-06-105386-4
- Resist or Serve: The Official Guide to The X-Files, Vol. 4 by Andy Meisler ISBN 0-06-107309-1
- The End and the Beginning: The Official Guide to The X-Files, Vol. 5 by Andy Meisler (Perennial Currents, 2000) ISBN 0-06-107595-7
- All Things: The Official Guide to The X-Files, Vol. 6 by Marc Shapiro (Harper Paperbacks, 2001) ISBN 0-06-107611-2
- X Marks the Spot: On Location With The X-Files by Louisa Gradnitzer & Todd Pittson, introduction by Tom Braidwood (Arsenal Pulp Press, 1999) ISBN 1-55152-066-4
- The Real Science Behind the X-Files: Microbes, Meteorites, and Mutants by Anne Simon, Ph.D. (Simon & Schuster / Touchstone, 2001) ISBN 0-684-85618-2
- The Art of the X-Files by Anne Rivers Siddons; introduction by William Gibson (HarperPrism, 1998) ISBN 0-06-105037-7
- The X Files Book of the Unexplained, Vol. One by Jane Goldman (Simon Schuster Trade) ISBN 0-684-81962-7
- The X Files Book of the Unexplained, Vol. Two by Jane Goldman (Harper Prism, 1997) ISBN 0-06-105280-9
- The Anderson Files, The Unauthorized Biography of Gillian Anderson by Marc Shapiro
- The Duchovny Files: The Truth Is in Here by Paul Mitchell (ECW Press, 1996) ISBN 1-55022-284-8
- Anderson + Duchovny, eXtra story by David Bassom
- The Unofficial X-Files Companion by N.E. Genge (Crown, 1995) ISBN 0-517-88601-4
- The New Unofficial X-Files Companion, Volume Two by N.E. Genge (Macmillan, 1996) ISBN 0-333-67981-4
- The X-Files Lexicon by N.E. Genge (Avon, 1997) ISBN 0-380-79023-8
- X-Files Confidential, The Unauthorized X-Philes Compendium by Ted Edwards (Little, Brown and Company, 1996) ISBN 0-316-88181-3
- The Science of The X-Files by Michael White
- The Complete X-Files: Behind the Series the Myths and the Movies by Chris Knowles and Matt Hurwitz (Hardcover – November 11, 2008)
- Wanting to Believe: A Critical Guide to The X-Files, Millennium & The Lone Gunmen by Robert Shearman (Mad Norwegian, 2009) ISBN 978-0-9759446-9-1
- The X-Files, part of the TV Milestones series from Wayne State University Press, by Theresa L. Geller (Wayne State University Press, 2016) ISBN 9780814339428
- The X-Files FAQ: All That's Left to Know About Global Conspiracy, Aliens, Lazarus Species, and Monsters of the Week (FAQ Series) by John Kenneth Muir (Paperback, 2015)
- The X Files Encyclopedia by Richard B. Gosnell (Paperback, 2015)
- The X-Files The Official Collection Volume 1 by Titan Comics (Paperback, 2016)
- The X-Files - Little Green Men: Monsters & Villains, The Official Collection Volume 2 (X-Files: the Official Collection) by Titan Comics (Paperback, 2016)
- The X-Files: The Official Collection Volume 3 Conspiracy Theory - The Truth, Secrets & Lies by Titan Comics (Paperback, 2016)
- The X-Files: The Untold History of Television by Kathleen Olmstead (Kindle, 2016)
- Writing The X-Files: Interviews with Chris Carter, Frank Spotnitz, Vince Gilligan, John Shiban, and Howard Gordon by Jason Davis (Paperback, 2016)
- The Complete X-Files: Revised and Updated Edition by Chris Knowles and Matt Hurwitz (Hardcover, 2016)
- The X-Files: The Official Archives: Cryptids, Biological Anomalies, and Parapsychic Phenomena by Paul Terry (Abrams, 2020) ISBN 9781419735172

and others.

== See also ==
- List of television series made into books
