= Sebastian DeVicente =

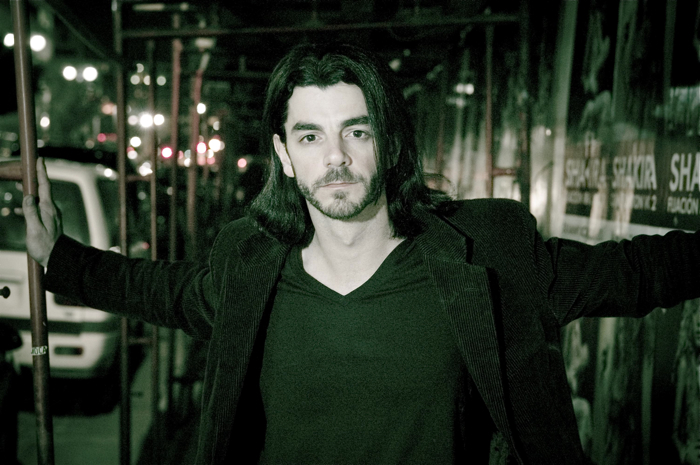
Sebastian DeVicente

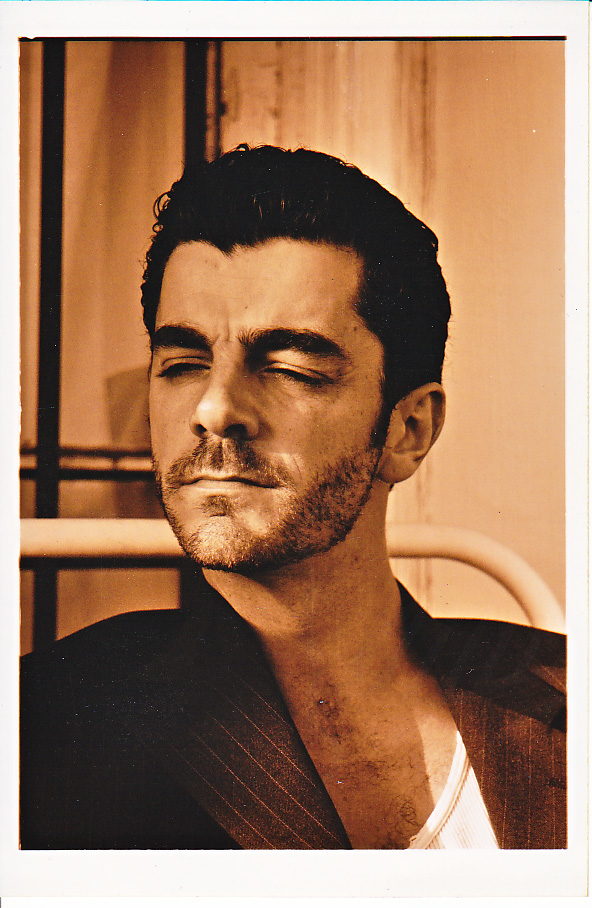
Sebastian DeVicente

Sebastian DeVicente (September 14th, 1971 - March 17th, 2016) was a trilingual actor (English, Spanish, Portuguese) mostly known for playing bad boys and off-beat characters. Some of his film credits include The City of Lost Souls (2000), a Japanese film directed by cinematic master Takashi Miike also starring Michelle Reis, Koji Kikkawa, and Terence Yin, and Dead in the Water (2002), a Lions Gate release directed by Gustavo Lipsztein also starring Dominique Swain, Henry Thomas, and Scott Bairstow.

In 2003, a nearly fatal motorcycle accident forced the young actor away from his career in Hollywood.

He died on March 17, 2016 due to unspecified circumstances.
