= The X-Files Season 11 =

The X-Files Season 11 may refer to:

- The X-Files Season 11 (comics), published by IDW Publishing in 2015
- The X-Files (season 11), broadcast by Fox Broadcasting Company in 2018
