= Religion in The X-Files =

The X-Files banner

The X-Files is an American science fiction television series and a part of The X-Files franchise, created by screenwriter Chris Carter. The program originally aired from September 10, 1993 to May 19, 2002. The show was a hit for the Fox network, and its characters and slogans, such as "The Truth Is Out There," "Trust No One," and "I Want to Believe," became popular culture touchstones in the 1990s. The series followed the quest of FBI Special Agents Fox Mulder (David Duchovny), a believer in supernatural phenomena, and Dana Scully (Gillian Anderson), his skeptical partner. Several episodes, characters, and story arcs deal directly with the notion of religion.

A main facet of the series is that, despite Mulder being the believer and Scully being the skeptic, Scully was a devout Catholic. Throughout the series, her Catholic faith served as a cornerstone, although at times a contradiction to her otherwise rigid skepticism of the paranormal. Due to her career in science and medicine, she drifted from her Catholic upbringing but remained somewhat entrenched in her religious beliefs. Several of the stand-alone episodes deal with Scully's faith, her questions about God, and her mission in life. Mulder, on the other hand, often cast organized religion in a more negative light, believing that many religious acts were caused by insanity.

== Religious themes ==
The first overt occurrence of religion occurred in the fourth episode of the first season, "Conduit". At the end of the episode, Mulder sits in a church, crying as he looks at a picture of his sister. Howard Gordon, who wrote the episode, stated that the imagery did not mean to imply Christianity, but rather a symbol of "a sanctuary, a place for him to reestablish his helplessness and the missing of his sister".

However, in "Beyond the Sea", the notion of religion and the afterlife was explored further, this time with Dana Scully. In the episodes prior to "Beyond the Sea", the protagonists of The X-Files are firmly established in the roles of believer (Mulder) and rational scientist/skeptic (Scully). "Beyond the Sea" is the first episode in which these roles are reversed. Scully, vulnerable after the death of her father, is persuaded by Boggs' apparent psychic ability. Meanwhile, Mulder refuses to believe the serial killer, discounts any evidence in Boggs' favor and will only consider rational explanations. According to Jan Delsara, Scully is inclined to believe Boggs because she identifies with him: they both understand the pressure of high family expectations. Scully strongly desired to make her father proud, despite not fulfilling his expectation that she become a doctor, and Boggs, in killing his family, had hoped to kill their expectations and judgment of him. In contrast, Mulder's relationship with his parents, based on resentment of them for their failure to protect his sister (themes developed later in the series), makes him unwilling to identify with Boggs. While Scully follows her instinct and solves the case, Mulder gets shot and ends up in the hospital because of his doubts and skepticism. According to Joe Bellon, as the episode progresses, even Scully's personality becomes like Mulder's and "for all narrative purposes, she becomes Mulder for almost an entire episode." According to Dean A. Kowalski, this role reversal of the partners represents a "blending" of Mulder and Scully's characters that is present throughout the series. Scully's co-option of Mulders' usual role also demonstrates the complexity of her character. Although she is strongly influenced by her scientific background, she has religious faith too. Paul C. Peterson notes that although this episode is not directly about religion, it shows the first of several visions Scully experiences throughout the series; later visions appear in episodes more directly related to religion and Scully's faith ("One Breath", "Elegy" and "All Souls"). In this episode, her faith in her father ultimately proves stronger than her belief in the paranormal as she refuses to be tempted by Boggs. Rather than take him up on his offer to help her contact her father, Scully visits her partner in the hospital.

As the series progressed, religion was explored further. The first-season episode "Miracle Man", for instance, featured a young boy who could raise the dead. Originally the script had called for more overt religious imagery, though censors at Fox objected to depictions of faith healer Samuel being beaten to death whilst in a cruciform pose, leading to scenes being cut.

== Background ==
Several episodes of the series have directly borrowed themes from novels focussing on religion—the third season episode "Talitha Cumi" was influenced by "The Grand Inquisitor", a chapter in Fyodor Dostoyevsky's novel The Brothers Karamazov; while the seventh season episode "The Sixth Extinction II: Amor Fati" drew inspiration from Nikos Kazantzakis' novel The Last Temptation of Christ. Both episodes were written by David Duchovny, and used Christ-like imagery in the series' overarching mythology, or fictional history. In "The Sixth Extinction II: Amor Fati", Fox Mulder is likened to Kazantzakis' depiction of Christ, experiencing a vision of an idyllic life while suffering on a cruciform operating table. "Talitha Cumi" sees The Smoking Man and an alien healer replicate a conversation between Christ and the titular Grand Inquisitor of Dostoyevsky's work, debating humanity's need for true faith in God versus faith in what an authority figure has decided is best for mankind.

== Reception ==
The use of religious imagery in the series has been met with mixed reactions from critics. The first-season episode "Miracle Man" has been derided for its depiction of "a stereotypical Bible-thumping Southern milieu"; with its Christ-like central character treated in a "kind of goofy" manner.

Critical reception to the third season episode "Revelations", which revealed Scully's religious devotion was more positively received. Zack Handlen from The A.V. Club wrote positively of Scully's portrayal in the episode, noting "Really, this works best as a Scully episode. I prefer Darin Morgan's version of the character…, but I doubt that version could support a full episode about God in the same way that this more searching, and lost, Scully does." However, Handlen was critical of some of the religious aspects of the episode, writing that the Christian God exists "does make it difficult for me to back it as fully as I'd like to" because it would "trump just about everything else that Mulder and Scully have spent their time on." John Keegan from Critical Myth noted that "Overall, this episode highlights Scully and her faith, and in the process, manages to presage many of the future plot developments for the series and her character. The spiritual war at the foundation of the series mythology is reflected in a situation that speaks directly to Scully and her upbringing, and though some of the religious metaphors are heavy-handed, it works well enough." Entertainment Weekly gave the episode a B+ and wrote positively of the episode's "inventiveness," which "derives from its choice of the most mainstream paranormality of all—Christianity."
