= The X-Files Season 10 =

The X-Files Season 10 may refer to:

- The X-Files Season 10 (comics), published by IDW Publishing in 2013
- The X-Files (season 10), broadcast by Fox Broadcasting Company in 2016
