= Millennium (2015 comic book) =

Comic book series published by IDW Publishing 2015

- Issue no. 1

Publication information
- Publisher: IDW Publishing
- Schedule: Monthly
- Format: limited
- Genre: Thriller
- Publication date: January – June 2015
- No. of issues: 5

Creative team
- Written by: Joe Harris
- Artist: Colin Lorimer

Millennium is a five-issue comic book series published by IDW Publishing from January and August 2015, based on the television series of the same name. The series was written by Joe Harris with artwork by Colin Lorimer, and featured cover art by menton3.

Millennium focuses on Frank Black, a former offender profiler investigating the Millennium Group, a cult-like organisation which had sought to control the end of the world at the turn of the 3rd millennium. Teaming up with Fox Mulder, Black learns that the Group is still operating over a decade after their supposed defeat, and have recruited his estranged daughter to combat gathering demonic forces.

The first issue, released on January 21, 2015, saw sales of over 8000 issues, though sales figures would subsequently drop. However, the series has been reviewed positively by critics, with Lorimer's artwork frequently singled out for praise. The complete series was collected in a trade paperback after its run was finished.

== Plot ==
=== Background ===
Set during the events of the season ten comic book series for The X-Files, the events of Millennium see Federal Bureau of Investigation agent Fox Mulder joining the long-standing crusade of offender profiler Frank Black as he combats the Millennium Group, a doomsday cult entrenched in elements of the United States law enforcement.

=== Events ===
Fox Mulder attends a parole hearing for Monte Propps, a serial killer he helped to apprehend in the late 1980s. Propps' method of killing involved brainwashing his kidnapped victims until they were willing to commit suicide by drowning; however he is now seen as a model reformee and is released. Shortly afterwards, Mulder meets with Frank Black, who warns him of the dangers of the offender's freedom. The two visit the released man's halfway house, arriving shortly after his parole officer; inside they find Propps drowned in his bath. In an alley outside, the parole officer is also found dead, with the ouroboros symbol of the Millennium Group tattooed on her neck. A child in the alley momentarily speaks to Black with the voice of a demonic entity he recognises, warning of impending disaster.

Black attempts to locate further information about the Millennium Group's activity, having believed them defeated in 1999. He finds that his access to their old computer systems still works, and learns that they may know the whereabouts of his daughter Jordan. Spurred on by several momentary encounters with similarly demonic beings, Black returns to his home town of Seattle, Washington. As he visits the grave of his wife Catherine, he is tranquillised and apprehended by Group members. Waking in captivity, he learns that they seek his help against the same demonic forces he has been encountering—and that Jordan is now a willing initiate of the Group. She has now begun to powerfully manifest visions of the future, similar to Black's ability to see the past through others' eyes.

Mulder follows Black to Seattle, arriving at the abandoned ruins of Black's old family home, where he is confronted by the powerful demon Lucy Butler. Black arrives to find Mulder struggling against her attempts to control him, and she threatens to kill them both, before Jordan arrives to intervene. Butler, now appearing in her full demonic form, is eventually banished by Jordan's psychic abilities. Jordan leaves again, knowing that the Group will need this power, as Mulder unsuccessfully tries to persuade Black to rejoin the FBI. Watching this is a black cat, which shapeshifts into Butler's human guise, who vows to wait "a millennium" for revenge.

== Publication ==
Millennium is a really unique concept and series with a lot of divergent ideas. The show really shifted in focus and tone over each of its three seasons on the air and those shifts, combined with its short lifespan, left a lot of unresolved stuff, and a lot of cool ideas that didn't get to develop over the years.

— Writer Joe Harris on adapting the Millennium TV series

Published by IDW Publishing, Millennium is a five-issue limited series, acting as a spin-off from the seventeenth issue of The X-Files Season 10, itself another IDW title. It is an adaptation of the 1990s television series Millennium, which featured Lance Henriksen as Frank Black. The comic series was written by Joe Harris with art by Colin Lorrimer, and saw Chris Carter, the creator of Millennium, serve as executive producer. Both Harris and Lorimer had previously worked on The X-Files Season 10. Cover art for the series was provided by menton3.

Harris cites the success of the adaptation of The X-Files for providing the impetus for a Millennium comic, noting that IDW editor-in-chief Chris Ryall approached him to write the latter series having seen the reception the former had been receiving. Harris himself had been a fan of the series during its initial broadcast, personally favouring its second season. He also expressed interest in possibly adapting another of Carter's creations, Harsh Realm.

== Release and reception ==
The first issue was released on January 21, 2015, and featured a variant cover by artist Paul Shipper. The issue sold 8,505 copies in North America, making it the 197th best-selling comic by units for that month. By the release of the second issue, sales had dropped to 6,273 issues, the 263rd highest sales figure for the month. A trade paperback collection comprising all five issues was released on August 12, 2015.

Critical reaction to the series was positive, with review aggregator website ComicBookRoundUp giving the series a score of 8.2 out of 10, based on 20 critics' reviews of individual issues. Reviewing the first issue for We The Nerdy, Taneisha Jane gave a score of 90 out of 100, describing it as having "excellent storytelling that will keep you engaged", and complimenting Lorimer's artwork. Comic Vine's Tony Guerrero praised Lorimer's "creepy" artwork, but felt that the storytelling required too much foreknowledge of the television series to fully understand. He summed the issue up as being "the crossover we've been waiting for". Reviewing the third issue for SciFiPulse, Patrick Hayes praised the series' use of photographic alternate covers for subscribers, and complimented the artwork and colouring throughout. Hayes rated the issue an "A" overall.
