= The City of Lost Souls =

- Directed by: Takashi Miike
- Written by: Ichiro Ryu
- Based on: Novel by Hase Seishu
- Produced by: Kazunari Hashiguchi; Toshiki Kimura; Hiroshi Yamamoto
- Cinematography: Naosuke Imaizumi
- Edited by: Yasushi Shimamura
- Music by: Kōji Endō
- Release date: September 15, 2000 (Toronto International Film Festival)
- Running time: 102 minutes
- Country: Japan
- Language: Japanese
- Budget: ¥2,000,000

The City of Lost Souls (Japanese: 漂流街, Hepburn: Hyōryū-gai) is a 2000 Japanese action film directed by Takashi Miike based on a novel by Hase Seishu.

== Plot ==
The Brazilian-Japanese criminal Mario hijacks a helicopter and uses a machine gun to attack a prison bus and free his Chinese girlfriend Kei. They attempt to raise money by robbing a cockfight but end up robbing drugs bought by the yakuza Fushimi of the Okayama Group from a Chinese triad boss named Ko moments before. Fushimi's boss demands his finger but Fushimi kills him and takes over his position with the aid of his soldier Yamazaki.

Mario and Kei sell the drugs to a local Brazilian TV broadcaster, who attempts to sell the drugs back to Ko but is beaten then given a message that there is a million-yen reward for Mario and Kei. Mario and Kei fly to Okinawa and are about to stow aboard a boat bound for Tapei then escape to Australia with the aid of their fake passports, but Fushimi abducts Mario's former lover Lucia's blind foster daughter Carla, so Mario and Kei return to Tokyo.

Kei is captured on the street by Riku and brought to Ko, who has always been in love with her. Fushimi and Yamazaki arrive and Ko challenges Fushimi to a ping-pong match, then uses a hidden button to shoot a spinning blade at Fushimi, which Fushimi dodges as Yamazaki shoots and kills Ko. The two yakuza take Kei with them, but Mario arrives and rescues Carla from the Okayama Group's offices before killing Fushimi and rescuing Kei.

Mario and Kei attempt to sail to Taiwan but Lucia catches them and shoots them dead with a rifle. A video montage during the credits reveals that Yamazaki and Riku become lovers.

== Cast ==
- Teah as Mario
- Michelle Reis as Kei
- Patricia Manterola as Lucia
- Mitsuhiro Oikawa as Ko
- Koji Kikkawa as Fushimi
- Ren Osugi
- Akaji Maro
- Anatoli Krasnov as Khodoloskii
- Sebastian DeVicente as Rikardo
- Terence Yin as Riku
- Atsushi Okuno as Carlos
- Akira Emoto as Kuwata
- Eugene Nomura as Yamazaki
- Marcio Rosario as Sanchez
- Ryuushi Mizukami as Ide
- Takeshi Nakajima
- Tokitoshi Shiota as Beaten chicken owner

== Other credits ==
- Produced by:
  - Kazunari Hashiguchi - producer
  - Toshiki Kimura - producer
  - Yasuyoshi Tokuma - executive producer
  - Tsutomu Tsuchikawa - planner: Daiei
  - Hiroshi Yamamoto - producer
- Casting: Donna Brower
- Production Design: Akira Ishige
- Art Direction: Reiko Kobayashi
- Assistant Director: Masato Tanno
- US set decorator: Isabelle Stamper
- Sound Department: Kenji Shibazaki - sound

== Reception ==
In a positive review of the film, Jesper Sharp of Midnight Eye wrote, "Colourful and exotic or cluttered and chaotic, even if the whole never quite manages to add up to the sum of its parts and lacks the weight of some of his earlier work, Takashi Miike on cruise-control is still a devastating force."
