= Sleepless (The X-Files) =

- The X-Files episode
- Episode no.: Season 2 Episode 4
- Directed by: Rob Bowman
- Written by: Howard Gordon
- Production code: 2X04
- Original air date: October 7, 1994
- Running time: 44 minutes

Guest appearances
- Mitch Pileggi as Walter Skinner; Nicholas Lea as Alex Krycek; Jonathan Gries as Salvatore Matola; Steven Williams as X; Don Thompson as Henry Willig; David Adams as Dr. Francis Girardi; Claude de Martino as Dr. Saul Grissom; Tony Todd as Augustus Cole; William B. Davis as The Smoking Man

Episode chronology
← Previous "Blood"	Next → "Duane Barry"
- The X-Files season 2

"Sleepless" is the 4th episode of the second season and 28th overall of the science fiction television series The X-Files, premiering on the Fox network on October 7, 1994. The episode was written by supervising producer Howard Gordon and directed by Rob Bowman. The episode is a "Monster-of-the-Week" story, unconnected to the series' wider mythology, although it features the first on-screen appearances of recurring characters X and Alex Krycek, who are central to the show's continuity. Its closing scene also sets the stage for the subsequent story arc of Scully's abduction. "Sleepless" earned a Nielsen rating of 8.6 and was viewed by 8.2 million households. The episode received mostly positive reviews from critics.

The show centers on FBI special agents Fox Mulder (David Duchovny) and Dana Scully (Gillian Anderson) who work on cases linked to the paranormal, called X-Files. In this episode, Mulder is assigned a new partner, Alex Krycek (Nicholas Lea). The two investigate a case where doctors and marines who were part of a sleep deprivation experiment are being killed off.

Howard Gordon, the episode's writer, was inspired by various cases of insomnia. During the first season, Chris Carter had written a similar themed episode but stopped working on it when he became "unhappy" with the result.

== Plot ==
In New York City, Dr. Saul Grissom finds a fire outside his apartment. Firefighters arrive and evacuate the building. One man who is being evacuated has a distinctive horizontal mark on the back of his neck; as he is being evacuated, he looks up at Grissom's apartment and smiles knowingly. The firefighters find no fire or any related damage, but discover Grissom's lifeless body in his apartment.

Fox Mulder anonymously receives a tape cassette of Grissom's 9-1-1 call. He tries to take the case, only to learn that another FBI agent, Alex Krycek, has opened it first. Deciding to leave Krycek out of the loop, Mulder calls Dana Scully (Gillian Anderson) and asks her to conduct Grissom's autopsy. He then heads to Grissom's clinic in Stamford, Connecticut, where he is confronted by an angered Krycek. The two travel back to Quantico to see Scully, who says that Grissom's body showed no signs of a fire, but yet seems to have biologically believed it was burning.

Meanwhile, in a Brooklyn apartment, Vietnam veteran Henry Willig is approached by Grissom's killer, a fellow ex-Marine named Augustus Cole. Suddenly, a group of wounded Vietnamese seemingly appear and gun Willig down. Examining Willig's corpse, Mulder and Krycek find a scar on his neck and realize he was in a Marine reconnaissance unit stationed in Vietnam in 1970; he was one of only two survivors, the other being Cole. They head to the VHA hospital in New Jersey where they discover that Cole was discharged, despite the fact that his doctor does not remember doing so.

Mulder meets a mysterious informant named "X", who gives him information on a secret military project that Grissom performed where he eradicated the need for sleep through lobotomy. X provides him with the name of Salvatore Matola, a squad member who was mistakenly reported as killed in action.

A man matching Cole's description robs a drug store. Mulder and Krycek arrive, but not before two gunshots are heard from the room where Cole is believed to be. It appears that the two officers in the room with him shot each other; Cole escapes. Mulder believes that Cole's years of sleeplessness have provided him with illusionary abilities. Mulder and Krycek meet with Matola soon afterwards, who says that he has not slept in twenty-four years due to the experiment. He reveals that another researcher with the squad, Dr. Girardi, was the one who actually performed the lobotomies.

Mulder and Krycek head to a subway station, where Dr. Girardi is expected to arrive for Grissom's funeral. Mulder sees Cole there, and Cole seems to shoot Girardi, but this is shown to be in Mulder's head. In reality, Cole has captured Girardi and holds him hostage, about to show him a similar fate as his other victims. By searching surveillance footage, the agents track his location and find Girardi wounded. Mulder finds Cole, who is ready to kill himself. Krycek, believing Cole is holding a gun instead of the Bible he is actually holding, shoots him, and Cole dies of his wounds. Mulder and Scully find both of their files on the case missing.

Krycek reports to the Smoking Man and others, telling them that the dissolution of the X-Files and the separation of Mulder and Scully has only made their determination stronger. He also notes that Scully is a bigger problem than they anticipated.

== Production ==
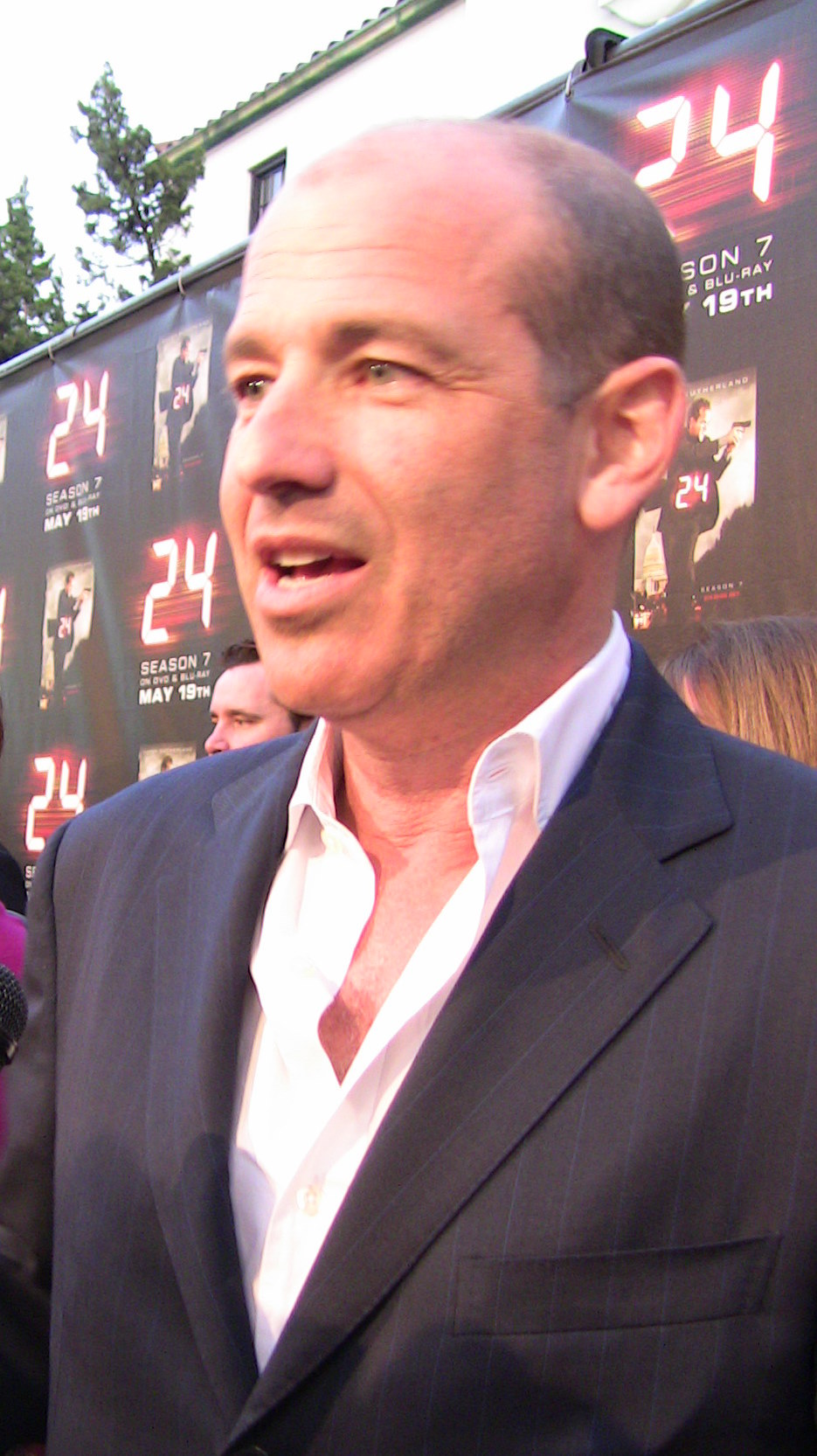
The episode was written by Howard Gordon.

Writer Howard Gordon was initially inspired to write this episode based on insomnia he was suffering at the time. Gordon, who wrote many episodes with Alex Gansa in season one, made his solo writing debut with this episode. Originally Chris Carter had written a script for the first season, which shared the same theme as "Sleepless." The original conceit for Carter's episode was, "What makes the perfect soldier?" He also liked the twist on sleep, noting that "sleep is where demons are released in our dreams." He explained that the characters in "Sleepless" were haunted by their memories in real life because they were not able to sleep. Carter sees this episode as one of his favorites.

This episode marked the first appearance of Nicholas Lea as Alex Krycek. Carter had much interest in Krycek, because he replaced Dana Scully as Mulder's new partner. Lea had previously appeared as a different character in the first season episode "Gender Bender." Bowman, who had directed "Gender Bender," thought that Lea "was a [...] strong choice for a fresh-out-of-Quantico FBI agent." When creating him, the writers always had in mind that he would be a recurring character, while they agreed if the character did not work they would kill him off.

"Sleepless" also marked the first onscreen appearance of Steven Williams as Mulder's new source, "X." The character was originally intended to be a woman, and Natalija Nogulich was initially cast in the role. However, after shooting her first scene the role was recast with Williams, an actor who had previous experience with writers Glen Morgan and James Wong. Nogulich was replaced because the writing staff felt she was not able to create the "right chemistry" between her co-stars.

== Reception ==
"Sleepless" debuted on October 7, 1994. It earned a Nielsen household rating of 8.6, with a 15 share, and it was viewed by 8.2 million households in the United States alone. Stephen Mark was nominated for a Primetime Emmy Award in 1995 in the category "Outstanding Individual Achievement in Editing for a Series — Single Camera Production", but did not win.

Carter enjoyed the episode, saying, "I really love that show. It's a great idea, well executed. We had a good cast; Tony Todd was wonderful" and saying it was "beautifully directed by Rob Bowman. Entertainment Weekly rated "Sleepless" with a B+, considering that Tony Todd's performance "elevates a just-good story into a great one." John Keegan Critical Myth gave the episode 7 out of 10, saying it was best remembered for its introduction of Alex Krycek. The web site further stated that the episode was decent and was a "fairly standard exploration" for the early season episodes. Dave Golder from SFX named the episode one of the "20 TV Sci-Fi Gamechangers" due to its introduction of Krycek.

Robert Shearman, in his book Wanting to Believe: A Critical Guide to The X-Files, Millennium & The Lone Gunmen, rated the episode four stars out of five. Shearman noted that Gordon was able to make "the cliche of Vietnam war guilt" feel "very personal and even sorrowful." However, he felt that the revelation of Krycek as an enemy was "the biggest shame" in the episode. Zack Handlen from The A.V. Club wrote that, while the episode is "your standard MotW riff", it is important because it features the on-screen introduction of both Krycek and X.

== See also ==
- Jacob's Ladder (film)

== Bibliography ==
- Edwards, Ted (1996). X-Files Confidential. Little, Brown and Company. ISBN 0-316-21808-1.
- Lovece, Frank (1996). The X-Files Declassified. Citadel Press. ISBN 0-8065-1745-X.
- Lowry, Brian (1995). The Truth is Out There: The Official Guide to the X-Files. Harper Prism. ISBN 0-06-105330-9.
- Shearman, Robert (2009). Wanting to Believe: A Critical Guide to The X-Files, Millennium & The Lone Gunmen. Mad Norwegian Press. ISBN 978-0-9759446-9-1.
