= Teah =

Teah is both a surname and a given name. Notable people with the name include:

- Robert Teah (born 1982), Liberian footballer
- Teah Charlton (born 2002), Australian rules footballer
- Teah Dennis Jr. (born 1992), Liberian footballer
