= Dead in the Water (2002 film) =

2002 film directed by Gustavo Lipsztein

- DVD cover
- Directed by: Gustavo Lipsztein
- Written by: Gustavo Lipsztein
- Produced by: Evan Astrowsky; Gustavo Lipsztein; Georg Lipsztein; Jay So
- Starring: Henry Thomas; Dominique Swain; Scott Bairstow; José Wilker; Sebastian DeVicente
- Cinematography: Marcelo Durst
- Edited by: Kurt Bullinger; Jose Pulido
- Music by: Heitor Pereira
- Production companies: E.H. Filmes; Nuts and Lloyd Films
- Distributed by: Das Werk; EuroVideo; Lions Gate Films; Promark Entertainment Group; Studio Home Entertainment
- Release date: February 12, 2002
- Running time: 90 minutes
- Country: United States
- Language: English

Dead in the Water is a 2002 American crime/thriller feature film written and directed by Gustavo Lipsztein.

== Plot ==
Gloria (Dominique Swain) is the spoiled daughter of a Brazilian businessman who is bankrupt. Her father asks her to take Marcos (Sebastian DeVicente), the son of her father's business partner, out for a swim in the ocean. She does so, using her father's yacht and accompanied by her boyfriend Danny (Scott Bairstow) and their buddy Jeffrey (Henry Thomas). Gloria is caught kissing Marcos. Danny is jealous and throws Marcos in the water with a life preserver. To scare Marcos, he then drives the boat to a distant island. When they return to where they left him, Marcos has disappeared. Afraid of the consequences of his possible drowning, they discuss alibis and try to figure a way out of their predicament, first destroying their relationships and then themselves.

== Partial cast ==
- Henry Thomas as Jeff
- Dominique Swain as Gloria
- Scott Bairstow as Danny
- Sebastian DeVicente as Marcos
- José Wilker as Father
- Renata Fronzi as Housekeeper
- Lavínia Vlasak as Brazilian Beauty

== Production ==
The film is a remake of the 1962 Roman Polanski film Knife in the Water, and like the Polanski original, was shot on locations in Brazil. Casting was announced in 2000.

== Reception ==
David Nusair wrote that the film was "fairly predictable, but mostly entertaining," and offered that "the performances are fine". Kevin LaForest felt that the film had the potential to be an enjoyable thriller, but that it was lacking in depth and originality, concluding that it was "too stiff and self-important." Christopher Null of AMC Filmcritic felt that was well-made and reasonably well-acted, but that its staging being confined to the yacht for 90 minutes became a little tiresome, summarizing "Not a bad time, but not a great movie. It hits and misses, but at least it floats." Buzz McClain of All Movie Guide wrote that the director's nontraditional style might not work for everyone, especially in consideration of Dominique Swain's performance, but added that there was no question that the film's conclusion will generate conversation and introspection for those who understand it.

== Awards and nominations ==
The film won "Best Cinematography", "Best Director", and received the Grand Jury Prize for "Best Feature Film" at the 2002 New York International Independent Film and Video Festival.
