= Android Apocalypse =

- DVD cover
- Written by: Karl Schiffman
- Directed by: Paul Ziller
- Starring: Scott Bairstow; Joseph Lawrence; Chris Jericho
- Music by: Todd Bryanton
- Countries of origin: United States; Canada
- Original language: English

Production
- Producers: Kim Berlin; Meyer Shwarzstein; Gail Tilson
- Cinematography: Mark Dobrescu
- Editor: Arthur Tarnowski
- Running time: 95 minutes

Original release
- Network: Sci Fi Channel
- Release: June 24, 2006

Android Apocalypse (also known as Facing Extinction) is a 2006 science fiction film starring Scott Bairstow and Joseph Lawrence. The film was written by Karl Schiffman and directed by Paul Ziller for Sci Fi Channel as a television film. It is set on a post-apocalyptic Earth that is ruled by androids, and explores the relationship between a human, Jute (Bairstow), and an android, DeeCee (Lawrence) who is beginning to develop emotions.

== Premise ==
On an android-controlled, post-apocalyptic Earth a human man named Jute (Scott Bairstow) is convicted of murdering an android. Dee-Cee (Joseph Lawrence) is an android who is beginning to develop human emotion, and is being transported to an android-run prison facility along with Jute. While in transit, their police vehicle is attacked. Jute and Dee-Cee escape and are forced into a strained alliance in order to survive in the harsh deserts of the world. As these two characters flee android authorities they stumble upon a genocidal plot being orchestrated by the leader of the androids, who hopes to rid the planet of human life forever.

== Cast ==
- Scott Bairstow as Jute
- Joseph Lawrence as Dee-Cee
- Chris Jericho as Tee-Dee
- Troy Skog as Varrta
- Wendy Anderson as Mrs. Carlson
- Brian Hlushko as Eric Carlson
- Mike O'Brien as Link Hamilton
- Amy Matysio as Rachael
- Shannon Jardine as Joy
- Corey Livingstone as Borka
- Anne Nahabedian as Tranc
- Aidan Simpson as Polton
- J.J. Elliott as Night Club Goer

== Distribution ==
Android Apocalypse was a television film produced for the Sci-Fi Channel. It was first aired on the 24th of June, 2006. Previously viewed DVD copies have been available at some Dollar Tree stores.

== Reception ==
Android Apocalypse was not received well by critics or the public. It was given mediocre reviews and remains fairly unpopular.
