= Robert Teah =

Liberian footballer

Personal information
- Full name: Robert Klaybalay Teah
- Date of birth: September 3, 1982 (age 44)
- Place of birth: Liberia
- Position: Defensive midfielder

Team information
- Current team: LPRC Oilers

Senior career*
Years	Team	Apps	(Gls)
2003–2004	Mighty Barolle		
2005	NPA Anchors		
2006	LPRC Oilers		
2006	NPA Anchors		
2007–2011	LPRC Oilers		

International career
2005	Liberia	3	(0)
- * Club domestic league appearances and goals as of 12:31, 14 September 2009 (UTC)

Robert Teah (born September 3, 1982) is a Liberian football midfielder who last played for LPRC Oilers.

Teah was also capped for the Liberia national football team. He made his debut for the senior national team, the Lone Star, at the First National Bank (FNB) stadium in Johannesburg. The Lone Star lost the match to South Africa's Bafana Bafana in the qualifiers of the 2002 Nations Cup.
