= Blood (The X-Files) =

- The X-Files episode
- Episode no.: Season 2 Episode 3
- Directed by: David Nutter
- Story by: Darin Morgan
- Teleplay by: Glen Morgan; James Wong
- Production code: 2X03
- Original air date: September 30, 1994
- Running time: 45 minutes

Guest appearances
- William Sanderson as Edward Funsch; John Cygan as Sheriff Spencer; Kimberly Ashlyn Gere as Bonnie McRoberts; George Touliatos as Larry Winter; Bruce Harwood as John Fitzgerald Byers; Dean Haglund as Richard Langly; Tom Braidwood as Melvin Frohike

Episode chronology
← Previous "The Host"	Next → "Sleepless"
- The X-Files season 2

"Blood" is the third episode of the second season of the science fiction television series The X-Files. It premiered on the Fox network on September 30, 1994. The teleplay was written by Glen Morgan and James Wong from a story by Darin Morgan, and was directed by David Nutter. The episode is a "Monster-of-the-Week" story, unconnected to the series' wider mythology. "Blood" earned a Nielsen household rating of 9.1, being watched by 8.7 million households in its initial broadcast.

The show centers on FBI special agents Fox Mulder (David Duchovny) and Dana Scully (Gillian Anderson) who work on cases linked to the paranormal, called X-Files. In the episode, Mulder and Scully investigate a series of killings in Franklin, Pennsylvania. All the suspects appear compelled to murder after seeing violent messages on electronic devices.

"Blood" was inspired by writer Glen Morgan's own hematophobia as well as controversy over malathion spraying in Southern California. The episode marked the second appearance of the Lone Gunmen in the series, as well as a guest appearance by pornographic actress Ashlyn Gere.

== Plot ==
In Franklin, Pennsylvania, postal worker Edward Funsch (William Sanderson) is informed that he will be laid off at the end of the week. Afterwards, Funsch sees the words "Kill 'Em All" on his machine's digital display. At Franklin's civic center, a middle-aged man in a crowded elevator sees "No Air" displayed on the elevator's LED display, and is the only one who can see the message. Sweating and obviously claustrophobic, he again glances at the LED display. This time it flashes the words "Can't Breathe" and then "Kill 'Em All."

Agent Fox Mulder arrives at the civic center in the aftermath of what looks like a massacre. Sheriff Spencer (John Cygan) explains that the suspect murdered four people from the elevator with his bare hands; his rampage ended when he was shot by a security guard. Spencer notes that seven other individuals have murdered twenty-two people in Franklin in the past six months. Mulder discovers that the LED display in the elevator has been damaged, and that the dead suspect has a green residue on his fingertips. Meanwhile, Funsch tries to make a withdrawal from an ATM, but is greeted with the words "Security Guard", "Take His Gun" and "Kill 'Em All" on the screen. He frustratedly beats the screen before running away, escaping from a confused security guard.

At the FBI Academy, Dana Scully reads Mulder's initial report. The only connection between the murders that he can see is that the suspects all destroyed an electronic device during the killings. Meanwhile, Bonnie McRoberts, another Franklin resident, drops by a repair shop to pick up her car, where a message on an engine diagnostic display warns her that the mechanic is going to rape her. She impulsively kills him with an oil can spout. When Mulder and Spencer question McRoberts the next morning, her kitchen microwave instructs her to kill them. When she grabs a knife and attacks Mulder, she is shot and killed by Spencer.

Scully performs an autopsy on McRoberts' body and discovers signs of phobia including high levels of adrenaline and the same substance found on the elevator killer. She hypothesizes that the substance, when combined with other neurochemicals, produces an LSD-like reaction. As Mulder and Scully build a case, Funsch becomes more psychotic, continuing to see violent messages on electronic displays. Blood is associated in some way with each incident; a volunteer asks Ed to donate blood at a department store and seconds later he sees several violent images flash across a sales display of TV sets, followed by a message to get a gun from the sporting goods department.

Late at night, while investigating an orchard, Mulder is sprayed by a crop-dusting helicopter and ends up in the hospital. There, he sees the message "Do It Now" on television and realizes that when people are exposed to the pesticide, which contains a chemical designed to provoke fear in insects, these subliminal messages are relayed to them on purpose and their phobias are exacerbated enough to cause them to kill. Mulder believes the town is being used as a testing ground by a third party, implying that the government is complicit. Eventually, after being confronted, a city councilman agrees to stop the spraying and test the community under the guise of a cholesterol study.

Mulder and Scully, reading that Funsch has not been tested yet, arrive at his house to find it strewn with smashed electronic devices. Mulder deduces that blood is Ed's phobia and that he has seen the subliminal messages, and an empty rifle case signals that Funsch is going to act on his paranoia. Funsch positions himself at the top of a clock tower overlooking a blood drive and begins shooting randomly. Mulder climbs up to Funsch and overpowers him; Funsch is taken away on a stretcher. Mulder makes a call to Scully to tell her the investigation has been resolved, but sees the message "ALL DONE" followed by "BYE-BYE" suddenly appear on his cell phone display. Scully calls out to Mulder but he is speechless.

== Production ==
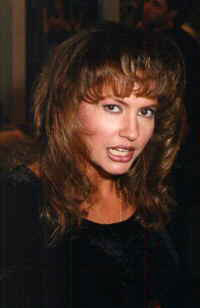
"Blood" features a cameo appearance from pornographic actress Ashlyn Gere.

The basic premise for "Blood" evolved from three topics: co-writer Glen Morgan's own hematophobia, the controversy over malathion spraying in Southern California, and a somewhat vague idea that Morgan and his writing partner James Wong had about focusing on postal workers. After series creator Chris Carter expressed his desire to feature a story revolving around digital readouts, Morgan and Wong decided to combine their disparate influences with the digital readout idea, eventually producing a script that turned "new technolog[ies]" (e.g. fax machines and cellular phones") into something "scary."

Morgan and Wong based the episode's climax on the University of Texas tower shooting in 1966. Of note, this scene was only partially filmed at the University of British Columbia because firearms were not allowed on location at the actual university. This necessitated that a replica of its clock tower's interior be constructed for use in several key scenes. This episode marks the first time that Darin Morgan, Glen's brother, helped with an X-Files script. Darin had been asked to help flesh out the episode's story, and he would later write the second season episode "Humbug".

The episode features the second appearance of The Lone Gunmen, a trio of conspiracy theorists consisting of John Fitzgerald Byers (Bruce Harwood), Richard Langly (Dean Haglund) and Melvin Frohike (Tom Braidwood). The characters first appeared in the first season episode "E.B.E." to make Mulder appear more credible. The three were initially slated to appear in only one episode, but they were brought back as recurring characters starting with "Blood" due to their popularity with fans of the show online. The episode also guest stars pornographic actress Ashlyn Gere, who plays Bonnie McRoberts, the woman driven to attack Mulder after seeing a subliminal message on her microwave. Glen Morgan joked that The X-Files was so cutting edge that they used an adult film star who was still working in the industry—an allusion to and jab at the NYPD Blue episode "Tempest in a C-Cup", which guest starred retired adult film actress Ginger Lynn.

== Reception ==
"Blood" premiered on the Fox network on September 30, 1994. This episode earned a Nielsen rating of 9.1, with a 16 share, meaning that roughly 9.1 percent of all television-equipped households, and 16 percent of households watching television, were tuned in to the episode. It was viewed by 8.7 million households.

The episode received positive reviews from critics. Entertainment Weekly gave the episode a B+, considering that despite the "convoluted plot" the episode "pays off in white-knuckle tension." Reviewer Zack Handlen of The A.V. Club labeled the episode as a "good" stand-alone story. He described it as "a memorable episode, due in no small part to its humor", praising the "simultaneously absurd and frightening" story with scenes that make the viewer "snicker even as you shudder". In addition, Handlen praised William Sanderson's performance, as well as the ending, calling it "the punchline [...] of Mulder's deepest fears, a group [The Syndicate] so secret that you never be sure they exist at all". Starpulse named the episode the tenth best of the series, defining it as "very creepy" and what turned The X-Files "from a mere creepfest to a show that offered real psychological thrills". Robert Shearman, in his book Wanting to Believe: A Critical Guide to The X-Files, Millennium & The Lone Gunmen, rated the episode three stars out of five. Shearman wrote positively of the episode's flourishes, noting "minute by minute, there is tons to enjoy." However, he argued that the premise is "disjointed and not a little frustrating" due to the lack of overall coherence and narrative.

== Other media ==
The plot for "Blood" was also adapted as a novel for young adults in 1996 by Les Martin, under the title Fear.

== Bibliography ==
- Hurwitz, Matt; Chris Knowles (2008). The Complete X-Files. San Rafael, California: Insight Editions. ISBN 978-1-933784-72-4.
- Delasara, Jan (2000). Poplit, Popcult, and the X-Files: Critical Exploration. Jefferson, North Carolina: McFarland & Company. ISBN 978-0-7864-0789-7.
- Gradnitzer, Louisa; Pittson, Todd (1999). X Marks the Spot: On Location with The X-Files. Arsenal Pulp Press. ISBN 1-55152-066-4.
- Lowry, Brian (1995). The Truth is Out There: The Official Guide to the X-Files. Harper Prism. ISBN 0-06-105330-9.
- Martin, Les (1996). Fear. HarperCollins. ISBN 0-06-440642-3.
- Shearman, Robert (2009). Wanting to Believe: A Critical Guide to The X-Files, Millennium & The Lone Gunmen. Mad Norwegian Press. ISBN 978-0-9759446-9-1.
