= The Host (The X-Files) =

- The X-Files episode
- The Flukeman as seen in the final stages of the episode. Many critics praised the creepiness of the villain.
- Episode no.: Season 2 Episode 2
- Directed by: Daniel Sackheim
- Written by: Chris Carter
- Production code: 2X02
- Original air date: September 23, 1994
- Running time: 45 minutes

Guest appearances
- Mitch Pileggi as Walter Skinner; Darin Morgan as The Flukeman; Matthew Bennett as Craig; Steven Williams as X (uncredited); Ron Sauve as Foreman

Episode chronology
| ← Previous "Little Green Men" | Next → "Blood" |
- The X-Files season 2

"The Host" is the second episode of the second season of the science fiction television series The X-Files, premiering on the Fox network on September 23, 1994. It was written by Chris Carter, directed by Daniel Sackheim, and featured guest appearances by Darin Morgan. The episode is a "Monster-of-the-Week" story, unconnected to the series' wider mythology. "The Host" earned a Nielsen household rating of 9.8, being watched by 9.3 million households in its initial broadcast. The episode received positive reviews, with critics praising the creepiness of the antagonist.

The show centers on FBI special agents Fox Mulder (David Duchovny) and Dana Scully (Gillian Anderson) who work on cases linked to the paranormal, called X-Files. In the episode, Mulder and Scully investigate a body found in sewage after being reassigned to different sections. Their inquiry results in the discovery of a bizarre fluke-like man—the product of the Chernobyl disaster—that soon goes on a rampage in the sewers of New Jersey.

Carter claimed to have been inspired to write the episode based on three incidents; his dog having worms, his research into Chernobyl, and the extinction of species during the 1990s. The Flukeman character was portrayed by Darin Morgan, brother of executive producer Glen Morgan. Darin would become a staff writer for the show later in the second season. In addition, "The Host" also introduced the character of X, the successor of Mulder's former Syndicate informant Deep Throat.

== Plot ==
On a Russian freighter off the coast of New Jersey, a crewman trying to fix the ship's toilets is pulled into the septic system. His water-logged body appears in the sewers of Newark days later. Fox Mulder is assigned the case and is shown the still-unidentified body. Mulder initially assumes the case is simply a gang-related murder, and angrily confronts Assistant Director Walter Skinner, feeling he has been given this "wild goose chase" as a form of punishment. That night, Mulder talks to Dana Scully, telling her that he is thinking of leaving the FBI. Scully performs the autopsy on the crewman's body, finding a Russian language tattoo on his arm and a flukeworm inside his liver.

In a Newark sewer, a city sanitation worker named Craig is rescued when an unseen creature pulls him underwater. Believing he was attacked by a python, he visits a doctor with Mulder observing. An examination of his back reveals an abnormal four-pointed wound. Shortly afterwards, Mulder receives a call from a mysterious man, telling him he has a friend at the FBI. Scully shows Mulder the flukeworm, whose mouth, though much smaller, matches the wound on Craig's back. That night, Craig dies in his shower after coughing up a flukeworm. Mulder visits a sewage processing plant and, along with a foreman named Ray, finds a large humanoid mutant with a fluke-like mouth.

At the FBI Academy, someone slips a newspaper article under Scully's door enabling her to identify the original body. Mulder and Scully meet at the processing plant and observe the "Flukeman". Skinner wants to prosecute the creature and subject it to a psychiatric evaluation, which Mulder thinks would be difficult. Skinner tells Mulder of Craig's death and admits that this should have been an X-file. Mulder insists that Craig's death could have been prevented if the X-files had remained open, but Skinner implies that the decision came from higher up the chain of command.

That night, as the Flukeman is being transported by van, it escapes its restraints and kills the driver. It hides in a portable toilet, is soon suctioned into a septic truck and is brought back to the sewage processing plant. Meanwhile, Mulder receives another call from the mysterious man, telling him that the X-files must be reopened. Scully tells Mulder that the flukeworm she discovered is a larva, revealing that the Flukeman is capable of asexual reproduction. Meanwhile at the plant, the Flukeman is spotted in a storm drain overflow pipe, with Mulder realizing it is using the drain to make an escape back to the ocean. Mulder and Ray then investigate the overflow pipe, but Ray is pulled underwater by the Flukeman. Mulder rescues him, bisecting the Flukeman at the waist with a sewer grate.

Scully concludes her investigation, hypothesising that the creature was brought to the U.S. by a Russian freighter that was hauling salvage material from the Chernobyl disaster, and that the creature was created in a "soup" of radioactive sewage. Elsewhere, in the drains beneath Newark, the Flukeman's eyes remain open.

=== Continuity ===
In the 2013 comic continuation of The X-Files called Season 10, a two-issue story, "Hosts", continues the story almost twenty years later after the events of this episode. According to the comics, the Flukeman escaped to Martha's Vineyard and began to multiply, abducting multiple beach-goers. The Flukeman and its offspring were nearly all killed, however, by a man revealed to be one of the Chernobyl liquidators. In addition, the story expanded upon the Flukeman's backstory, revealing that he was a liquidator named Gregory, who, after being locked in a sewage tanker truck at Chernobyl, gestated the mutated flukeworm that grew into the original Flukeman after he was exposed to irradiated cooling water from the still-burning nuclear reactor and to flatworms in the sewage tank.

== Production ==
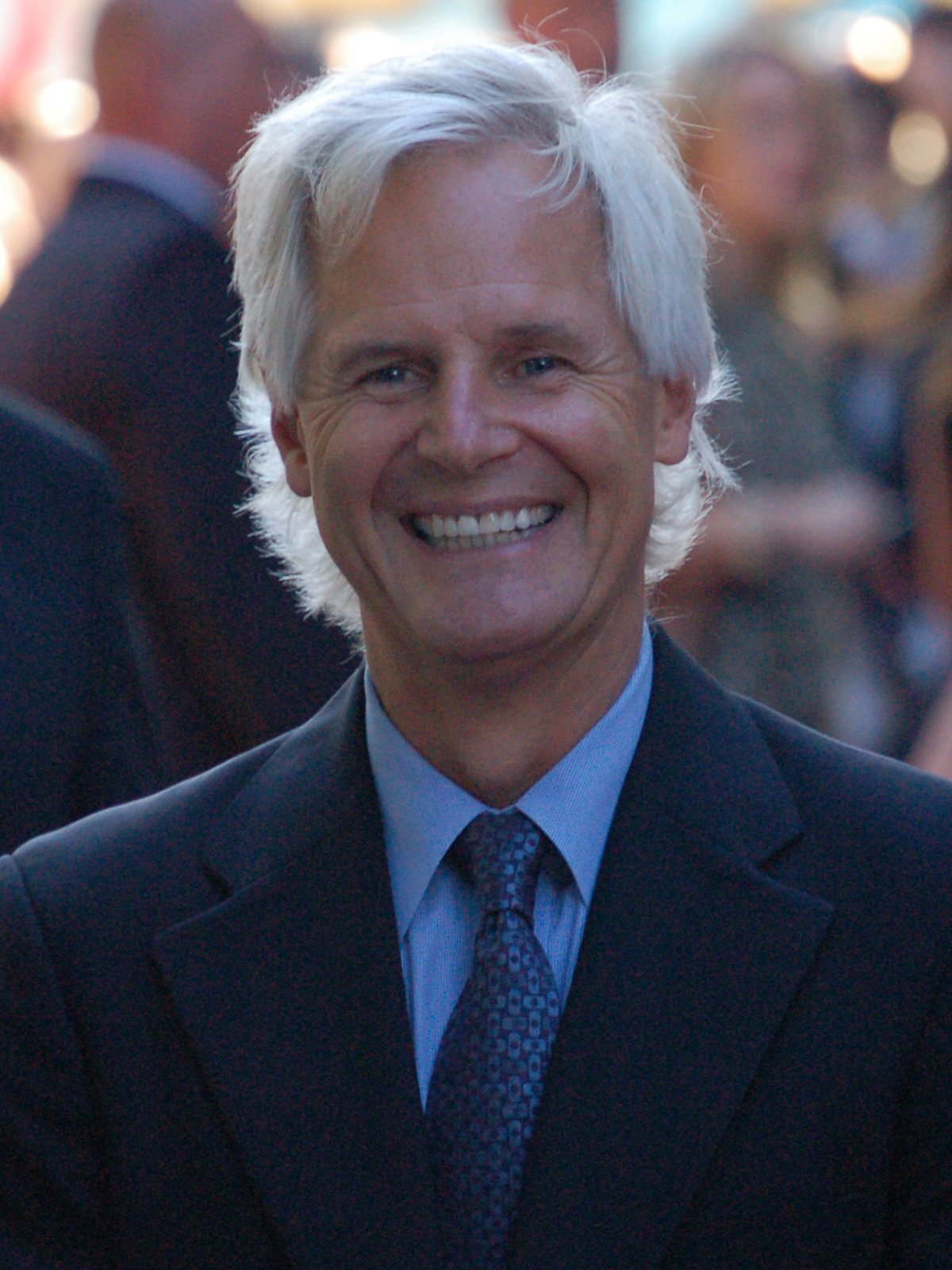
Series creator Chris Carter was the writer for "The Host".

=== Writing ===
Chris Carter claimed to have been inspired to write the episode after his dog had worms, a situation he called "very disgusting". He also had been reading about the Chernobyl disaster and the extinction of species at the time, blending all three of these concepts when writing the episode. Carter described his mood while writing the episode: "I was in a funk when I wrote that episode. We were coming back from hiatus and I was trying to find something more interesting than just the Flukeman. I was irritated at the time and I brought my irritation to Mulder's attitude. Basically, he had become fed up with the FBI. They had given him what he felt was a low assignment, which was sending him into the city after a dead body. But lo and behold, he finds that this is a case that for all intents and purposes is an X-File. It's been given to him by a man he's never looked at as an ally, Skinner. So it's an interesting establishing of a relationship between them." Producer J. P. Finn described the episode as a departure from Carter's usual work as it did not deal with an alien subject matter.

=== Casting and filming ===
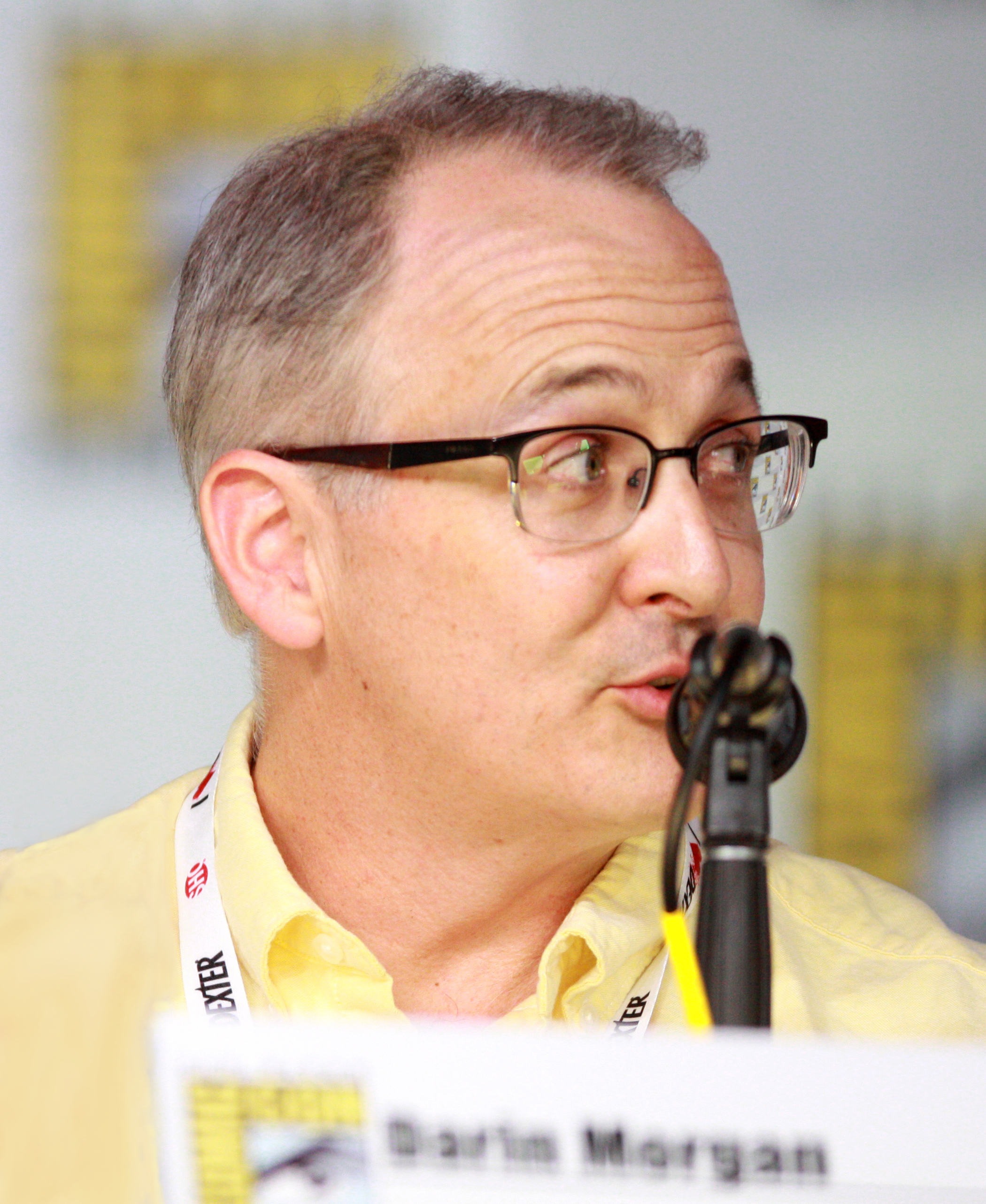
Darin Morgan, who would later become a writer for the show, played the Flukeman.

The Flukeman—also known affectionately as "Flukey" by the cast and crew—was portrayed by Darin Morgan, brother of executive producer Glen Morgan. He would become a staff writer for the show later in the second season. The Flukeman suit used by Morgan, which included flipper-like feet, yellow contact lenses and fake teeth, took six hours to put on; this process was eventually sped up. Morgan wore the suit as many as twenty consecutive hours during shooting. As a result, he was forced to go to the bathroom while still wearing the suit. Morgan was rarely on set without being in full costume, and recalled that when he met up with David Duchovny again upon joining the series' writing staff, the actor had no idea who he was despite having enjoyed an amiable relationship with the costumed Morgan previously.

The suit dissolved in water, forcing special effects artist Toby Lindala to reconstruct the suit each day. Because the suit did not permit Morgan to breathe through his nose, he was unable to eat while wearing it. Carter described the character as "the embodiment of everyone's sense of vulnerability, the idea of something that exists in the underworld of the sewer system and might in fact come to bite you in the least elegant of places". The original intention was showing even less of the Flukeman, but some angles and lighting ended up revealing more of the creature's design. Carter still felt it helped to "get more creepy", as the Flukeman is not shown fully until the final scenes.

The sewer processing plant scenes were shot at Iona Island Sewage Treatment plant in Richmond, BC. The sewer scenes were shot in a pit on the show's stage, with Carter using his father, who worked as a construction worker, as a consultant on how to build it. As no ship was available for filming the opening scenes in the Russian freighter, the BC Hydro Port Mann Substation in Surrey, British Columbia, was adapted into an engine room.

Carter had to fight with the Fox network's broadcast standards department over the scene where a victim vomits up a flukeworm while in the shower. James Wong described it as the grossest piece of television ever put on the air. As Gillian Anderson's pregnancy was getting more apparent, the producers started to shoot Scully's scenes in a way it would be disguised, with "very fancy trick angles, trench coats, and scenes where she is seated rather than standing".

== Broadcast and reception ==
"The Host" premiered on Fox on September 23, 1994. This episode earned a Nielsen rating of 9.8, with a 17 share, meaning that roughly 9.8 percent of all television-equipped households, and seventeen percent of households watching television, were tuned in to the episode. It was viewed by 9.3 million households.

The episode received glowing praise from critics. Entertainment Weekly gave "The Host" a rare A+, noting that it was "a refreshing instance of a fully and satisfactorily resolved episode — like a perfect meal, although you definitely don't want to eat during this one." Reviewer Zack Handlen of The A.V. Club described the episode as "the first really, really icky X-Files", and while considering the plot redundant, given that the creature comes back to the sewers after escaping, he felt that "The Host" "holds up because of the Flukeman's irreconcilable ugliness, and because it continues down the path that 'Little Green Men' started on". A writer from the Vancouver Sun listed "The Host" as one of the best stand alone episodes of the show, saying that it broke the "B-movie fun at best" quality of most X-Files standalone episodes, saying that "thanks to its cinema-grade make-up effects, claustrophobic sets and chilling subject matter, this Chris Carter-penned episode not only took the show to new heights of horror and suspense, it offered a fresh alternative on network television". "The Host" was later picked for the 2008 DVD The X-Files: Revelations, with eight episodes Chris Carter considered "essential grounding" for the film The X-Files: I Want to Believe. The plot for the episode was also adapted as a novel for young adults in 1997 by Les Martin.

The Flukeman character has also attracted praise. Writing for Den of Geek, John Moore listed the Flukeman as one of his "Top 10 X-Files Baddies", writing that "the idea of a man size biter running around drains in a city near me – looking like a giant, fanged maggot – was always likely to induce a goodly amount of cheek-shifting on the sofa." The A.V. Club's Zack Handlen described the flukeman as a "beyond icky" monster that "just looks wrong", adding that "the plain fact of its existence is horrifying enough that it doesn't need to do more". Connie Ogle from PopMatters ranked the character among the "best" monsters-of-the-week, describing it as "something of a poster boy for XF villains," and considering that "never has toxic waste seemed so dangerous as when the big slimy white fellow slithers onto the screen and starts attacking people in the sewers."

== Bibliography ==
- Edwards, Ted (1996). X-Files Confidential. Little, Brown and Company. ISBN 0-316-21808-1.
- Gradnitzer, Louisa; Pittson, Todd (1999). X Marks the Spot: On Location with The X-Files. Arsenal Pulp Press. ISBN 1-55152-066-4.
- Hurwitz, Matt; Knowles, Chris (2008). The Complete X-Files. Insight Editions. ISBN 978-1-933784-80-9.
- Lovece, Frank (1996). The X-Files Declassified. Citadel Press. ISBN 0-8065-1745-X.
- Lowry, Brian (1995). The Truth is Out There: The Official Guide to the X-Files. Harper Prism. ISBN 0-06-105330-9.
- Martin, Les (1997). The Host: A Novel. HarperCollins. ISBN 0-06-447181-0.
