= E.B.E. (The X-Files) =

- The X-Files episode
- Episode no.: Season 1 Episode 17
- Directed by: William Graham
- Written by: Glen Morgan; James Wong
- Production code: 1X16
- Original air date: February 18, 1994
- Running time: 44 minutes

Guest appearances
- Jerry Hardin as Deep Throat; Bruce Harwood as John Fitzgerald Byers; Dean Haglund as Richard Langly; Tom Braidwood as Melvin Frohike; Peter LaCroix as Ranheim/Frank Druce

Episode chronology
← Previous "Young at Heart"	Next → "Miracle Man"
- The X-Files season 1

"E.B.E." (short for extraterrestrial biological entity) is the seventeenth episode of the first season of the American science fiction television series The X-Files, premiering on the Fox network on February 18, 1994. It was written by Glen Morgan and James Wong, and directed by William Graham. The episode introduced the recurring characters of The Lone Gunmen, played by Bruce Harwood, Dean Haglund and Tom Braidwood; and saw Jerry Hardin reprise his role as Deep Throat. The episode helped explore the series' overarching mythology. "E.B.E." earned a Nielsen household rating of 6.2, being watched by 5.8 million households in its initial broadcast; and received positive reviews from critics.

The show centers on FBI agents Fox Mulder (David Duchovny) and Dana Scully (Gillian Anderson) who work on cases linked to the paranormal, called X-Files. When Mulder and Scully investigate the possible smuggling of a crashed UFO and its inhabitant across America, they find themselves being spied on and face doubts over the motives of a secretive informant.

Inspired by the film All the President's Men (1976), "E.B.E." was the first mythology-centered episode written for the show by writers Morgan and Wong. The episode introduced the recurring characters later known collectively as The Lone Gunmen, played by Bruce Harwood, Dean Haglund and Tom Braidwood, and Jerry Hardin reprised his role as Deep Throat. The characters, who were used to help Mulder appear more credible, later became recurring characters and eventually gained their own spin-off series, The Lone Gunmen.

== Plot ==
In the skies over Iraq, an Iraqi fighter jet shoots down a UFO, which crashes in Turkey. Later, in Tennessee, a truck driver named Ranheim shoots at something in the dark as another UFO flies overhead. Fox Mulder (David Duchovny) and Dana Scully (Gillian Anderson) investigate the sighting the next day, but Ranheim is quickly let go by the uncooperative local authorities. In a seemingly inconsequential event, a woman briefly borrows Scully's pen before they leave Tennessee.

Back in Washington, D.C., Mulder introduces Scully to the Lone Gunmen, a trio of eccentric conspiracy theorists with whom he collaborates. After returning to FBI headquarters, Scully discovers a surveillance device within her pen. Mulder meets with Deep Throat, who provides him with documentation of an intercepted Iraqi transmission regarding the downed UFO. Scully continues to investigate the Tennessee incident, learning that two thousand pounds of extra weight had been added to Ranheim's truck. She also learns Ranheim's true identity as Frank Druce. Mulder and Scully argue briefly over the trustworthiness of Deep Throat, whom Mulder defends.

Mulder intends to track Druce's truck, which is on its way to Colorado. However, before he leaves, Deep Throat approaches him at his apartment, offering the photo of a purported UFO at Fort Benning. Mulder initially believes that Druce's truck is a decoy meant to distract him from the UFO, but discovers that Deep Throat's photo is a fake. When Mulder confronts Deep Throat, he admits his deception and confirms that the earlier transmission was genuine. He also divulges that the truck is transporting an extraterrestrial biological entity, or E.B.E., recovered from the Iraqi crash site. Mulder and Scully escape their pursuers and head towards Las Vegas, the last known location of the truck.

Mulder and Scully catch up with the truck, and while pursuing it encounter strange weather. The truck stalls, but when they look inside it they find both Druce and the E.B.E. have vanished. When they investigate the truck and the area, Mulder concludes that the encounter was a constructed hoax, intended to convince the duo to cease further pursuit. With help from MUFON and NICAP, Mulder tracks Druce and the E.B.E. to a power plant in Mattawa, Washington. With assistance from the Lone Gunmen, the agents enter the plant with fake identification. Their unfamiliarity soon gives them away, but Mulder flees from the guards through a restricted area and is about to approach the room where the creature is held when armed guards stop him.

Deep Throat appears and calls off the guards, telling Mulder the E.B.E. is dead. He reveals a secret agreement made between multiple countries after Roswell that any living E.B.E. found would be killed, and that he is one of three men to have executed an E.B.E. Mulder looks through the window into the creature's holding cell, but it is empty. Mulder suspects that Deep Throat of lying to him, though he doesn't know which part of Deep Throat's information is a lie. Afterwards, Deep Throat lets Mulder and Scully go free.

== Production ==
This episode was the first mythology-centred episode written for the show by writers Glen Morgan and James Wong. Morgan claims that the tone of the episode was inspired by the movie All the President's Men (1976). Some of the scenes were inspired by photographs sent to Morgan and Wong by location scouts of a BC Hydro power station, which was used as a shooting location in the episode. The empty "lab" area that had held the episode's eponymous entity in the final scene was, in fact, a research facility used for testing electric current events.

The episode also introduced the characters of the Lone Gunmen—conspiracy theorists John Fitzgerald Byers (Bruce Harwood), Richard Langly (Dean Haglund) and Melvin Frohike (Tom Braidwood). The characters, who were used to help Mulder appear more credible, were originally meant to only appear in this episode, but due to their popularity on the Internet, they returned in the second-season episode "Blood" and became recurring characters. The inspiration for the Lone Gunmen came from a group of men that writers Morgan and Marilyn Osborn met at a UFO convention in June 1993. The trio would eventually feature in the spin-off series The Lone Gunmen. Braidwood, who plays Lone Gunman Melvin Frohike, was the first assistant director for the series, and became Frohike after passing by the office where the producers were casting the roles of the Gunmen. Braidwood's name had been used in several episodes, including this one, as an in-joke due to his assistant director role.

== Broadcast and reception ==
"E.B.E." premiered on the Fox network on February 18, 1994. The episode earned a Nielsen household rating of 6.2 with a 9 share, meaning that roughly 6.2 percent of all television-equipped households, and 9 percent of households watching TV, were tuned in to the episode. A total of 5.8 million households watched this episode during its original airing.

Wong was disappointed with the episode, feeling that he "didn't do a great job on the script. We wanted to do a show that's all about paranoia and a conspiracy theory, but at the end I felt like we didn't really gain a lot of new ground or learn a lot of new things. I think we played a lot of texture instead of substance." Series creator Chris Carter on the other hand claimed the episode was one of the most popular first-season episodes and thought the teaser and the scene with Mulder meeting Deep Throat at a shark tank were memorable. He also praised Jerry Hardin's performance in the episode, finding that he lent the show the "believability" that it needed.

In a retrospective of the first season in Entertainment Weekly, the episode was rated an A, being called "dense, dazzling, and dark", with the introduction of The Lone Gunmen being praised. Zack Handlen, writing for The A.V. Club, described it as "occasionally clunky but generally fun", finding the revelations of Deep Throat's motivation to be a highlight. Matt Haigh, writing for Den of Geek, felt that the episode was a good example of the series refusing "to show its hand too early", saying that it would even have worked well as a season finale. The plot for "E.B.E." was also adapted as a novel for young adults in 1996 by Les Martin.

== Footnotes ==
=== References ===
- Edwards, Ted (1996). X-Files Confidential. Little, Brown and Company. ISBN 0-316-21808-1.
- Gradnitzer, Louisa; Pittson, Todd (1999). X Marks the Spot: On Location with The X-Files. Arsenal Pulp Press. ISBN 1-55152-066-4.
- Hurwitz, Matt; Knowles, Chris (2008). The Complete X-Files. Insight Editions. ISBN 978-1-933784-80-9.
- Lovece, Frank (1996). The X-Files Declassified. Citadel Press. ISBN 0-8065-1745-X.
- Lowry, Brian (1995). The Truth is Out There: The Official Guide to the X-Files. Harper Prism. ISBN 0-06-105330-9.
