= The X-Files Season 11 (comics) =

8+1-issue comic book series

Publication information
- Publisher: IDW Publishing
- Schedule: Monthly
- Genre: Science fiction
- Publication date: August 12, 2015
- Main character(s): Fox Mulder; Dana Scully

Creative team
- Created by: Chris Carter
- Written by: Joe Harris
- Artist: Matthew Dow Smith
- Letterer: Chris Mowry
- Colorist: Jordie Bellaire

The X-Files Season 11 is an 8+1-issue comic book series published by IDW Publishing. The title follows The X-Files Season 10 comic book series and serves as an extension of the television series The X-Files. Chris Carter, who created the television series, is the executive producer of the comic book series, while the issues are written by Joe Harris and illustrated by Matthew Dow Smith and Jordie Bellaire.

== Publication ==
=== Issues ===
Title	Issue #	Release date
Cantus	1	August 12, 2015
Writer: Joe Harris		Artist: Matthew Dow Smith
Mulder has become a fugitive from a government that considers him a "secrets stealer" on the order of Julian Assange or Edward Snowden thanks to the mechanizations of "The Glasses-Wearing Man." It's up to Scully, and what allies Mulder has left, to work to clear his name and keep the government itself from falling further into the villain's clutches.
Home Again, Part 1	2	September 9, 2015
Writer: Joe Harris		Artist: Matthew Dow Smith
Despite his fugitive status, Mulder continues to investigate X-Files along the highways and byways of America. His latest stop is a secluded farm, which he soon discovers to be the new home of the infamous Peacock family!
Home Again, Part 2	3	October 7, 2015
Writer: Joe Harris		Artist: Matthew Dow Smith
Despite his fugitive status, Mulder continues to investigate X-Files along the highways and byways of America. His latest stop is a secluded farm, which happens to be the new home of the infamous Peacock family!
Home Again, Part 3	4	November 11, 2015
Writer: Joe Harris		Artist: Matthew Dow Smith
Scully follows a mysterious lead, but is it crucial to finding Mulder or just another of Gibson Praise's games? Meanwhile, Mulder deals with the fallout from the recent "Peacock Family Reunion" and wonders if he really can go "Home Again," himself.
My Name is Gibson	5	December 2, 2015
Writer: Joe Harris		Artist: Matthew Dow Smith
In this standalone story, Gibson Praise's past is explored. The Syndicate wasn't the only faction that pursued the child prodigy—and continues to do so to this day…
The X-Files X-Mas Special 2015	Special	December 23, 2015
Writer: Joe Harris		Artist: Matthew Dow Smith
Special Season 11 tie-in! Just in time for the holiday season, the Lone Gunmen learn of the impending arrival of some unwelcome visitors. But before they can raise the alarm, they receive some other unexpected guests.
Endgames, Part 1	6	January 20, 2016
Writer: Joe Harris		Artist: Matthew Dow Smith
Gibson Praise sees his master plan close to becoming reality. Will Mulder and Scully be able to stop him? Will they really want to? Find out in the stunning finale of Season 11, which starts here!
Endgames, Part 2	7	February 10, 2016
Writer: Joe Harris		Artist: Matthew Dow Smith
Gibson Praise sees his master plan close to becoming reality. Will Mulder and Scully be able to stop him? Will they really want to? Find out in the stunning finale of Season 11!
Endgames, Part 3	8	April 6, 2016
Writer: Joe Harris		Artist: Matthew Dow Smith
Gibson Praise sees his master plan close to becoming reality. Will Mulder and Scully be able to stop him? Will they really want to? Find out in the stunning finale of Season 11, which ends here!

==== Hardcover Collected Volumes ====
Volume	Issues collected	Release date	ISBN
1	1–5	April 2016	ISBN 978-1-63140-527-3
2	6–8 and the Christmas Special 2015	June 2016	ISBN 978-1-63140-643-0
