= Rob Bowman (director) =

American film director (born 1960)

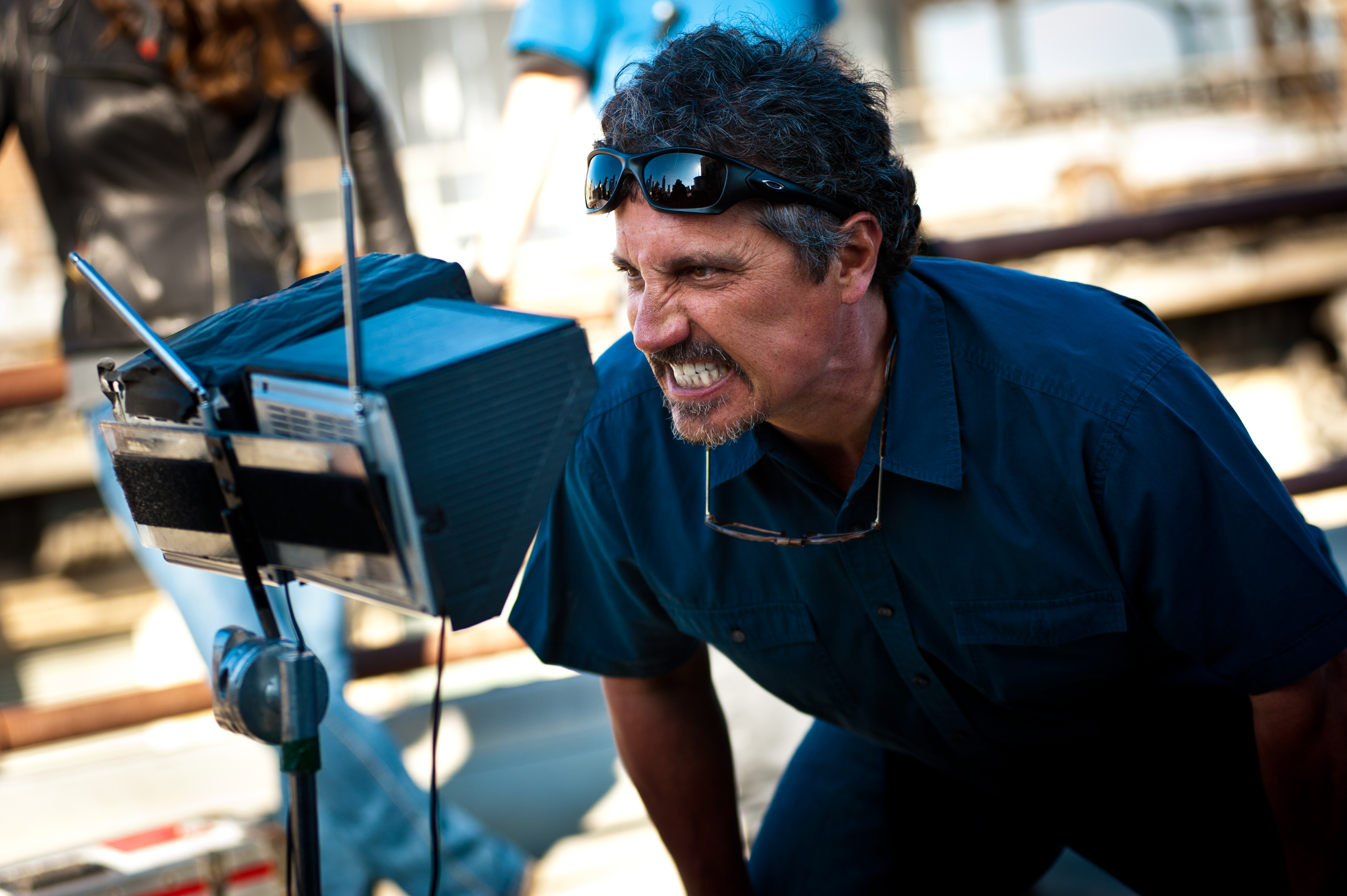
- Bowman in 2012
- Born: Rob Stanton Bowman; May 15, 1960 (age 66); Wichita Falls, Texas, U.S.
- Education: University of Utah
- Occupations: Director, producer
- Known for: Star Trek: The Next Generation, The X-Files, The X-Files, Castle, Reign of Fire
- Spouse: Dusty Dawn Bowman (m. 2006)

Rob Stanton Bowman (/ˈboʊmən/; born May 15, 1960) is an American director. He grew up around film and television production, and developed an interest in the field because of the work of his father, director Chuck Bowman. Bowman is a prolific director for television, and has contributed to series such as Star Trek: The Next Generation and The X-Files, for which he received four consecutive Emmy nominations as a producer. He was an executive producer and director for the comedy drama Castle.

Bowman has directed four feature films: Airborne, The X-Files, Reign of Fire, and Elektra.

== Early life and education ==
Bowman grew up around film and television production. His father, Chuck Bowman, is a filmmaker who became active in the industry when Rob was an adolescent. Bowman first became fascinated with the process of filmmaking when he saw The Wizard of Oz as a child. Growing up, he watched his father make commercials and documentaries, often acting as an assistant crew member. Bowman said that conversations with his father enabled him to see how the hard work of a filmmaking crew becomes invisible when the film is made. He said, "what remains are the emotions and the drama of the story and the characters. What remains is the magic."

In his late teens, he moved to Utah, where he became a "ski bum", and worked as a bartender. After writing, producing and directing a story for a film production class at the University of Utah, Bowman knew he wanted to be a filmmaker. "It became as clear to me as a Fourth of July fireworks display that was where my passion was," he said. Bowman moved to Los Angeles, and got a job at Stephen Cannell Productions, starting in the mail room. He took film classes, and studied film directors, developing a sense of his own personal style. He became fascinated with how each director used the same tools, but arrived at a unique aesthetic. He said, "I learned early on that to be successful as a director, you had to have your own signature. Otherwise, why hire one person over another?" He worked for Cannell for over two years, observing the production of over 400 hours of television. Around age 20, he wrote a mission statement for himself, committing himself to strive for excellence in filmmaking.

== Career ==
=== Star Trek: The Next Generation and early work ===
Bowman started directing for television while doing second unit work for Stephen Cannell Productions in 1982. After leaving Cannell's company in 1987, he sent out videos of his work, looking for a job. Impressed by one of Bowman's Stingray episodes, producer Robert H. Justman hired him to direct for Star Trek: The Next Generation during its first season. Bowman was only 27 years old at the time, and in his first meeting with executive producer Rick Berman, Berman mistook him for the pizza delivery boy. He was originally slated to direct the 10th episode of Star Trek's first season, but one of the series' directors, Donald Petrie, dropped out early to direct the film Mystic Pizza. This gave Bowman the opportunity to direct the fourth episode of the season, "Where No One Has Gone Before". Bowman investigated the sets two weeks early to begin prepping the episode. Bowman told Starlog magazine, "Walking through those empty sets was very intimidating for me. I kept asking myself how I was going to do justice to these sets, tell the story and still get the performances from the cast." Star Trek creator Gene Roddenberry was so impressed with the dailies for the episode, that he made an appearance on set to praise Bowman in front of the cast and crew. Immediately following directing "Where No One Has Gone Before", Bowman directed an episode of the Fox Broadcasting Company's television series Werewolf. Berman and Justman had planned to hire Bowman for only a single episode, but his agent worked out a two-episode deal, leading to Bowman directing the ninth Star Trek episode, "The Battle".

1988 was a busy year for Bowman. In addition to directing five more episodes of Star Trek: The Next Generation that year, he also directed episodes for Werewolf, Sonny Spoon, The Highwayman, Probe, and 21 Jump Street.

On the strength of his direction for the television series Parker Lewis Can't Lose, he was offered to direct his first feature film, Airborne, a coming-of-age story involving teenage rollerbladers.

=== The X-Files ===
After seeing a commercial for The X-Files pilot episode, Bowman called his agent and told him he wanted to direct for the series. He was asked to direct the episode "Gender Bender" for The X-Files by executive producer R. W. Goodwin, who had previously worked with Bowman on the series Mancuso, F.B.I.. X-Files creator and executive producer Chris Carter invited Bowman to return and direct more episodes. Bowman was eventually made a producer on the series.

=== Castle ===
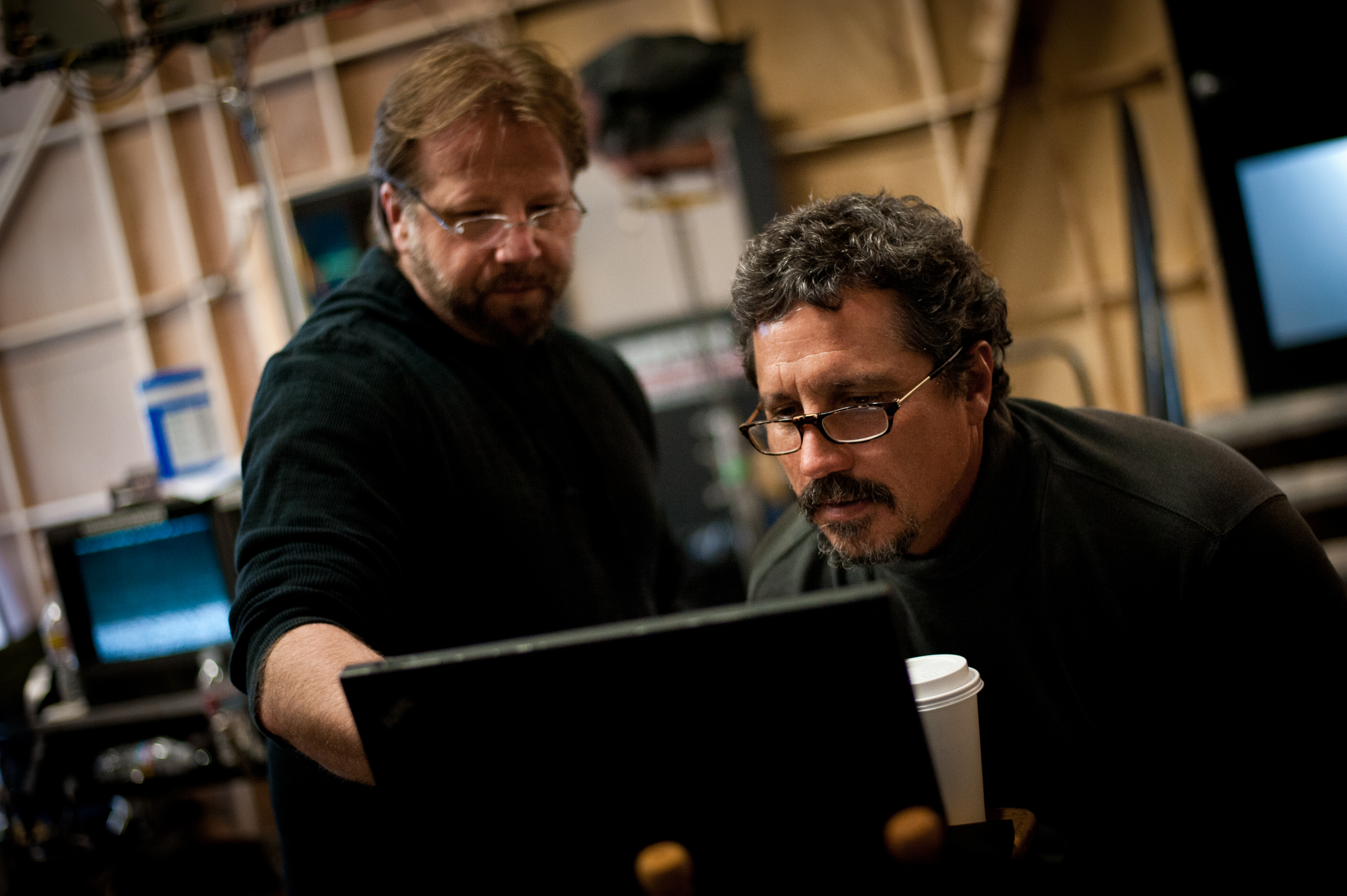
Andrew Marlowe and Bowman on the set of Castle

The American Broadcasting Company (ABC) hired Bowman to direct the pilot for Castle, a television series about a crime novelist who consults with the New York City Police Department (NYPD). The series was created by Andrew Marlowe, who served as executive producer along with his wife Terri Miller. When Miller stepped down as executive producer, Bowman took on the role.

== Style ==
Bowman's signature visual style involves lighting contrasts within a scene, including framing actors as silhouettes. The X-Files writer and producer Frank Spotnitz said that Bowman works very hard to make every "scene as beautiful and as complementary to the story as possible". He said that Bowman's camera movements were never gratuitous and were deliberately planned to aid viewers in understanding what was happening in a scene. Spotnitz complimented Bowman's attention to lighting for mood, saying "You would think that on a television schedule you don't have time to compose and think thoroughly about all these issues, but Rob really does."

== Filmography ==
Film

- Airborne (1993)
- The X-Files (1998)
- Reign of Fire (2002)
- Elektra (2005)

TV movies

- Marlowe (2007)
- Big Thunder (2013)
- Occult (2015)
- Staties (2018)

TV series

Year	Title	Director	Producer	Notes
1986–1987	Stingray	Yes	Associate	3 episodes
1987	21 Jump Street	Yes	No	1 episode
1987–1988	Werewolf	Yes	No	2 episodes
1987–1990	Star Trek: The Next Generation	Yes	No	13 episodes
1988	Sonny Spoon	Yes	No	1 episode
1988	Probe	Yes	No	1 episode
1988	The Highwayman	Yes	No	3 episodes
1989	MacGyver	Yes	No	1 episode
1989	Booker	Yes	No	1 episode
1989	Alien Nation	Yes	No	1 episode
1989	Baywatch	Yes	No	Episode "The Reunion"
1989	Mancuso, F.B.I.	Yes	No	2 episodes
1989	Hardball	Yes	No	2 episodes
1990	Midnight Caller	Yes	No	1 episode
1991	Against the Law	Yes	No	1 episode
1991	Dark Shadows	Yes	No	2 episodes
1991	DEA	Yes	No	1 episode
1991	Quantum Leap	Yes	No	1 episode
1991–1993	Parker Lewis Can't Lose	Yes	No	12 episodes
1992	Tequila and Bonetti	Yes	No	2 episodes
1992–1993	The Hat Squad	Yes	No	2 episodes
1993	The Adventures of Brisco County, Jr.	Yes	No	1 episode
1994	Traps	Yes	No	1 episode
1994	M.A.N.T.I.S.	Yes	No	2 episodes
1994–2000	The X-Files	Yes	Yes	33 episodes
1995	VR.5	Yes	No	1 episode
2001	The Lone Gunmen	Yes	Co-Executive	Pilot
2005	Night Stalker	Yes	No	1 episode
2006	Nightmares & Dreamscapes: From the Stories of Stephen King	Yes	No	2 episodes
2006–2007	Day Break	Yes	Executive	6 episodes
2009–2016	Castle	Yes	Executive	29 episodes
2017	The Catch	Yes	No	1 episodes
2017–2018	Code Black	Yes	No	3 episodes
2018	The Crossing	Yes	Executive	1 episode
2018	Quantico	Yes	No	1 episode
2019	The Rookie	Yes	Executive	1 episode
