= Joe Harris (writer) =

American comic book writer and screenwriter

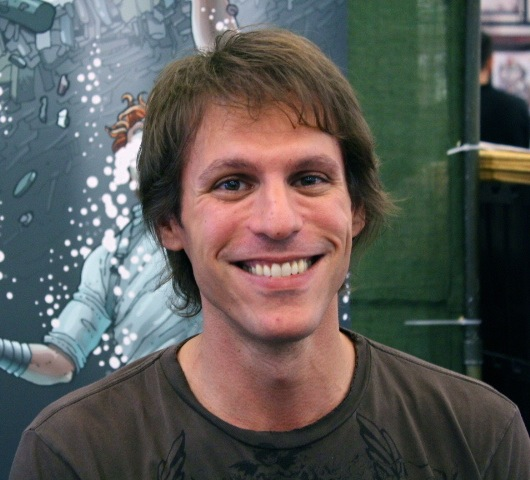
- Harris at the 2013 Wizard World New York Experience in Manhattan
- Area: Writer
- Notable works: Darkness Falls; The X-Files: Season 10; The Nightmare Factory; The Joker's Asylum; Battle for the Cowl: Man-Bat; The Fury of Firestorm

Joe Harris is an American comic book writer and screenwriter. He made his big screen debut in 2003 with his screenplay for the Sony Pictures release Darkness Falls.

== Career ==
In film, Harris' screenplay for Darkness Falls was based on Tooth Fairy, his short film which presented a horrific twist on the children’s bedtime myth. He wrote the politically themed slasher film The Tripper which featured David Arquette as writer and director.

In comics, Harris has written for many major publishers, writing X-Men, Spider-Man, and Batman.

Harris has various creator-owned projects. In 2010 Oni Press released the five-issue miniseries Ghost Projekt, written by Harris and illustrated by Steve Rolston. In 2011 Oni Press published Harris' miniseries, Spontaneous in 2011 with Brett Weldele. In mid-2013, Oni Press released Harris' hardcover graphic novel Wars in Toyland, which is illustrated by Adam Pollina. In 2012, with Image Comics, Harris and artist Martin Morazzo premiered the ongoing series, Great Pacific, which ran for 18 issues.

Harris replaced Gail Simone as the writer on The Fury of Firestorm for DC Comics as part of The New 52, DC's 2011 reboot of its superhero continuity and comic book line. He wrote issues #0 and #7-12.

In March 2013, IDW Publishing and Twentieth Century Fox Consumer Products announced that Harris would be the writer of The X-Files: Season 10, an in-continuity monthly comic book series executive produced by X-Files creator Chris Carter. The premiere issue debuted on June 19, 2013 and it ran for 25 issues. In much the same fashion Harris wrote the in-continuity monthly comic book series' The X-Files: Season 11 and The X-Files.

== Bibliography ==
=== Aftershock ===
- Disaster Inc. #1-5 (2021)

=== Boom! Studios ===
- RoboCop: To Live and Die in Detroit (2014)

=== Dark Horse ===
- B.P.R.D.: There's Something Under My Bed (2003)
- Creepy #1, #3 (2009, 2010)
- Darkness Falls: The Tragic Life of Matilda Dixon (2003)
- David Arquette's The Tripper (2007)

=== DC/Wildstorm ===
- Batman: The Dark Knight #6, #8 (2012)
- The Batman Chronicles #19 (2000)
- Batman: Battle for the Cowl: Man-Bat (2009)
- Batman: Joker's Asylum: Scarecrow (2008)
- Cybernary 2.0 #1-6 (2001)
- DCU Halloween Special '09 (2009)
- DCU Halloween Special '10 (2010)
- Firestorm: The Nuclear Men #0, #7-12 (2012)

=== Dynamite Entertainment ===
- Alice Cooper #1-5 (2014-2015)
- Vampirella And The Scarlet Legion #1-5 (2011)
- Vampirella vs. Dracula #1-3 (2012)

=== Image Comics ===
- Great Pacific #1-18 (2012-2014)
- Rockstars #1-Present (2016–Present)
- Snowfall #1-9 (2016-2017)

=== IDW Publishing ===
- Millennium #1-5 (2015)
- The X-Files: Season 10 #1-25 (2013-2015)
- The X-Files: Season 11 #1-8 (2015-2016)
- The X-Files #1-17 (2016-2017)
- The X-Files: X-Mas Special 2014 (2014)
- The X-Files: X-Mas Special 2015 (2015)
- The X-Files: X-Mas Special 2016 (2016)

=== Marvel Comics ===
- Bishop: The Last X-Man #1-15 (1999-2000)
- Generation X Annual 1998 (1998)
- Generation X Holiday Special (1998)
- Slingers #0-12 (ongoing) (1998-1999)
- Spider-Man vs. Punisher #1 (2000)
- Uncanny X-Men #358 (1998)
- X-Factor #147 (1998)
- X-Force #77, #101 (1998, 2000)
- X-Men Unlimited #20 (1998)
- X-Men: Liberators #1-4 (1998-1999)
- X-Men: The Search for Cyclops #1-4 (2000-2001)

=== Oni Press ===
- Ghost Projekt #1-5 (2010)
- Spontaneous #1-5 (2011)
- Wars in Toyland Graphic Novel (2013)

=== Valiant Entertainment ===
- Armor Hunters: Bloodshot #1-3 (2014)
- Divinity III: Aric, Son of the Revolution #1 (2017)
