= Scott Bairstow =

Canadian actor

- Born: Scott Hamilton Bairstow; April 23, 1970 (age 56); Steinbach, Manitoba, Canada
- Other name: Bair
- Occupation: Actor
- Years active: 1980–2006
- Spouse: Marty Rich (m. 1994; div. 2000)
- Children: 2

Scott Hamilton Bairstow (born April 23, 1970) is a Canadian actor known for his roles as Newt Call on the syndicated western television drama Lonesome Dove: The Series and as Ned Grayson on the American television drama series Party of Five. He was born in Steinbach, Manitoba, to Douglas and Diane Bairstow, professional classical musicians.

== Career ==
Bairstow first appeared on television at the age of 10, in a show called Let's Go. He moved to New York City when he was 17 and landed a part on the soap opera All My Children playing "Stuart Chandler" in flashback scenes to the character's youth. He had the lead role opposite Cybill Shepherd in the TV film There Was a Little Boy (1993) and has also appeared opposite such well-known actors as Kevin Costner in The Postman (1997) and Kris Kristofferson in Two for Texas (1998). He also played "Marty Stouffer" in Wild America opposite Devon Sawa and Jonathan Taylor Thomas (1997).

In addition to his roles on Party of Five and The X-Files episode "Miracle Man" (1994), Bairstow starred as the lead character, Newt Call, in the syndicated western television series Lonesome Dove: The Series and Lonesome Dove: The Outlaw Years. He also played the lead, Lt. Tom Hobbes, in Chris Carter's short-lived series Harsh Realm. In 2003, Bairstow guest-starred on the two-part series finale of Touched by an Angel, playing a handyman named Zach and, later in the episode, "God". He played in Tuck Everlasting in 2002 as Miles Tuck.

== Personal life ==
Bairstow was married to Marty Rich from 1994 to 2000, and has two sons, Casey (b. 1995) and Dalton (b. 1998).

In May 2003, Bairstow was charged in Everett, Washington with second-degree child rape for allegedly sexually assaulting a 12-year-old girl, who is related to Bairstow's former wife, and later asking her to keep quiet about it. In December 2003, he pleaded guilty to the lesser charge of second-degree assault. Bairstow entered an Alford plea, under which he maintained his innocence but conceded that he would likely be convicted by a jury if the case went to trial. He was sentenced to four months in jail, one year's community supervision, and was required to undergo a sexual deviancy evaluation. He was also ordered to have no contact with the girl for 10 years and to pay for any counseling she requires.

== Filmography ==
Film roles
Year	Title	Role	Notes
1994	White Fang 2: Myth of the White Wolf	Henry Casey	
1997	Black Circle Boys	Kyle Sullivan	
1997	Wild America	Marty Stouffer Jr.	
1997	The Postman	Luke	
1999	To Live For also called My Last Love	Michael	TV movie
1999	Delivered	Canyon	
2002	Dead in the Water	Danny	
2002	New Best Friend	Trevor	
2002	Tuck Everlasting	Miles Tuck	
2003	The Bone Snatcher	Dr. Zack Straker	

Television roles
Year	Title	Role	Notes
1993	There Was a Little Boy	Jesse	TV movie
1993	Country Estates	Oliver	TV movie
1994	The X-Files	Samuel Hartley	Episode: "Miracle Man"
1994–1995	Lonesome Dove: The Series	Newt Call	Main role, 21 episodes
1995–1996	Lonesome Dove: The Outlaw Years	Newt Call	Main role, 22 episodes
1997	Killing Mr. Griffin	Mark Kinney	TV movie
1997	Oddville, MTV		1 episode
1998	Two for Texas	Son Holland	TV movie
1998	Significant Others	Henry Callaway	Main role, 6 episodes
1998–2000	Party of Five	Ned Grayson	Recurring role, 20 episodes
1999–2000	Harsh Realm	Lieutenant Thomas Hobbes	Main role, 9 episodes
2001	Silicon Follies		TV movie
2001	Semper Fi	Cliff Truckee	TV movie
2001–2002	Wolf Lake	Tyler Creed	Main role, 9 episodes
2002	Breaking News	Ethan	TV series
2002	The Twilight Zone	Lieutenant Jeffrey Freed	Episode: "Hunted"
2003	Touched by an Angel	Zack	Episode: "I Will Walk with You: Part 1"; Episode: "I Will Walk with You: Part 2"
2006	Android Apocalypse	Jute	TV movie
