= Miracle Man (The X-Files) =

- The X-Files episode
- Episode no.: Season 1 Episode 18
- Directed by: Michael Lange
- Written by: Chris Carter; Howard Gordon
- Production code: 1X17
- Original air date: March 18, 1994
- Running time: 45 minutes

Guest appearances
- R. D. Call as Sheriff Maurice Daniels; Scott Bairstow as Samuel Hartley; George Gerdes as Reverend Calvin Hartley; Dennis Lipscomb as Leonard Vance

Episode chronology
← Previous "E.B.E."	Next → "Shapes"
- The X-Files season 1

"Miracle Man" is the eighteenth episode of the first season of the American science fiction television series The X-Files, premiering on the Fox network on March 18, 1994. It was written by Howard Gordon and series creator Chris Carter, directed by Michael Lange, and featured guest appearances by R. D. Call and Scott Bairstow. The episode is a "Monster-of-the-Week" story, unconnected to the series' wider mythology, although plot elements relate to the abduction of Mulder's sister Samantha. It is one of several season one episodes that establish the centrality of the childhood trauma to Mulder's character. "Miracle Man" earned a Nielsen household rating of 7.5, being watched by 7.1 million households in its initial broadcast; and received mixed reviews from critics.

The show centers on FBI agents Fox Mulder (David Duchovny) and Dana Scully (Gillian Anderson) who work on cases linked to the paranormal, called X-Files. When Mulder and Scully receive a video tape of a faith healer whose latest patient died mysteriously, the agents come to believe the healer's ministry may be covering up several murders.

"Miracle Man" was the first episode of The X-Files written by Gordon without the aid of his long-term collaborator Alex Gansa. Carter helped Gordon flesh out the details of the episode. Exterior shots for the episode were filmed on location in Steveston, British Columbia, Canada, which had previously been used in the earlier first season episode "Gender Bender".

== Plot ==
In 1983, a young boy, Samuel Hartley, appears at the scene of a car accident and pushes his way past an emergency crew. He opens a body bag and commands the severely burnt cadaver inside to "rise up and heal." Samuel's father, Calvin, convinces a fireman to let him continue. The body inside the bag comes alive, grabbing Samuel's hand.

Eleven years later, Dana Scully shows Fox Mulder a videotape of a religious service led by the now-grown Samuel (Scott Bairstow), who has become an evangelical faith healer for a ministry run by Calvin. The video shows a supposed healing which later left the follower dead. The agents travel to Clarksville, Tennessee, where they attend a service featuring an enthusiastic sermon by Leonard Vance, the man whom Samuel raised from the dead a decade earlier. The agents learn from Calvin that Samuel has gone missing.

Samuel eventually turns up drunk at a local bar, his faith shaken by the death. He is taken into custody. The agents doubt his ability, but he is able to convince Mulder that he knows the latter has lost a sister—Samantha—at a young age. Mulder has been seeing visions of Samantha, and continues to see them. At Samuel's bail hearing, the courtroom fills with a swarm of locusts, which Samuel claims is a sign of God's wrath against him.

Once he is released, Samuel returns to his ministry and attempts to heal a woman in a wheelchair. However, she suffers a seizure and dies, which leads to Samuel's second arrest. An autopsy reveals the woman died of cyanide poisoning, while Mulder and Scully find evidence that the swarm of locusts, which were actually common grasshoppers, was guided by someone to the courtroom through the building's ventilation system. Mulder believes Samuel to be innocent. However, the local sheriff, Maurice Daniels, allows two of his men to beat Samuel to death in his cell.

At his home, Vance is confronted by a ghostly vision of Samuel, who accuses him of betraying the church and perpetrating the murders. Vance confesses and blames his bitterness at having been resurrected with such a scarred and deformed visage. Mulder and Scully, who have been able to trace a large purchase of grasshoppers to Vance, arrive to find the man dying of cyanide poisoning from his own glass of water. He confesses to the agents before falling dead.

As the agents prepare to finish work on the case, they receive a phone call and learn that Samuel's body has gone missing from the morgue, and witnesses have seen him walking around, badly bruised. Meanwhile, Daniels is arrested by one of his deputies for questioning by the district attorney over Samuel's death. As Mulder and Scully leave Tennessee, Samuel's ministry closes down, and Mulder sees one last vision of his missing sister before he gets into his car.

== Production ==
"Miracle Man" was the first episode of The X-Files written by Howard Gordon without the aid of his long-term collaborator Alex Gansa. The pair had worked on several other series before The X-Files, and had also contributed the episodes "Conduit", "Ghost in the Machine", "Fallen Angel" and "Lazarus" to the series so far. Series creator Chris Carter recalls being asked to collaborate on the episode, saying, "Howard came to my house, and said, 'Help me out,' so we went to my living room and put up this bulletin board and in a matter of hours we came up with this story". Originally the script had called for more overt religious imagery, though censors at the Fox network objected to depictions of faith healer Samuel being beaten to death whilst in a cruciform pose, leading to scenes being cut.

Exterior shots of the town were filmed on location in Steveson, British Columbia, Canada—a location which had previously been used in the earlier first season episode "Gender Bender". Scenes set in the home of Reverend Hartley were shot in a mansion in the Langley area, with the crew taking advantage of an old filled-in swimming pool in the building to set up the necessary equipment. All of the scenes set in the faith healer's tent were filmed in one day, and involved over three hundred extras. Producer R. W. Goodwin felt that the greatest difficulty in creating the episode was the challenge in finding enough actors in the Vancouver area who could portray a convincing Southern United States accent, leading to the hiring of a dialect coach to prevent the cast from sounding "like they were coming from fifteen different parts of the South".

== Broadcast and reception ==
"Miracle Man" premiered on the Fox network on March 18, 1994. The episode earned a Nielsen household rating of 7.5 with a 13 share, meaning that roughly 7.5 percent of all television-equipped households, and 13 percent of households watching TV, were tuned in to the episode. A total of 7.1 million households watched this episode during its original airing.

In a retrospective of the first season in Entertainment Weekly, the episode was rated a B−. Scott Bairstow's guest role was praised, though it was noted that "an ultimately contrived plot and a stereotypical Bible-thumping Southern milieu make for a case more suited to Jessica Fletcher than Mulder and Scully". Zack Handlen, writing for The A.V. Club, described it as "a largely predictable story that hits all the middle-of-the-road marks", finding the religious imagery to have been used to little effect. Matt Haigh, writing for Den of Geek, felt that the identity of the killer was one of the few endings amongst first season episodes that he had found genuinely surprising, though he attributed this to the episode's focus on Mulder's personal history. The use of Mulder's visions of his sister Samantha as a motivation for his actions in this episode has been seen as "opening up" the overarching search for the truth about her through the series. The plot for "Miracle Man" was also adapted as a novel for young adults in 2000 by Terry Bisson.

== Footnotes ==
=== References ===
- Cantor, Paul A (2003). Gilligan Unbound: Pop Culture in the Age of Globalization. Rowman & Littlefield. ISBN 0-7425-0779-3.
- Edwards, Ted (1996). X-Files Confidential. Little, Brown and Company. ISBN 0-316-21808-1.
- Gradnitzer, Louisa; Pittson, Todd (1999). X Marks the Spot: On Location with The X-Files. Arsenal Pulp Press. ISBN 1-55152-066-4.
- Lowry, Brian (1995). The Truth is Out There: The Official Guide to the X-Files. Harper Prism. ISBN 0-06-105330-9.
- Parish, Jane (2001). The Age of Anxiety: Conspiracy Theory and the Human Sciences. Wiley-Blackwell. ISBN 0-631-23168-4.
