= Menton J. Matthews III =

Menton3
- Also known as: Avis, Saltillo, Menton3
- Born: Menton J. Matthews III; January 3, 1976 (age 50); Mississippi, United States
- Occupations: illustrator, comic book artist, songwriter
- Instruments: cello, viola, violin, guitar, drums, piano/keyboards, bass guitar, electronics
- Years active: 2006–present

Menton J. Matthews III (born January 3, 1976, in Mississippi) is an American musician, painter, illustrator, and comic book artist currently living in Chicago. He is known mostly as Menton3, but also as Avis and as Saltillo. Matthews is a multi-instrumentalist who can play a number of diverse instruments such as cello, viola, violin, guitar, drums, piano, and bass.

== Music ==
Matthews started his music work as a member of Sunday Munich, a band which was created with his then wife Sarah Matthews. During that time he adopted the name Avis J. Matthews III. Saltillo is an alias used by Menton J. Matthews III for his solo project. His debut album "Ganglion" was released in 2006 under Suspicious Records, a sub-label of Hive Records. He started cooperation with Artoffact Records and they re-released this album in 2011. His next two albums ("Monocyte", "Monocyte: The Lapis Coil") were also released under mentioned label, both in 2012. "Monocyte" was created as a concept album and a soundtrack to the comic book of the same name (also created by Menton J. Matthews III and published by IDW Publishing).

== Painting ==
Menton started drawing and painting as a child, already then he wanted to make comic books. His gift developed over the years and now he can be called self-taught painter. For some time he turned and dedicated himself to music. After the Saltillo album was released, he thought of painting his wife a canvas. Doing so brought back memories and for next few years he painted as much as he could. The idea of creating comic books came back to him, consequently he self-published his graphic novel, Ars Memoria. He admitted, in interview from 2010, that up to this date, it was the hardest and most rewarding thing he have done artistically. He had a pin up in Proof #25 (image comics), and Zombies vs Robots Aventure (IDW publishing) a four issue miniseries of which he has 'the first nine to eight pages of, plus a great deal of independent covers and pin ups'.

Asked about his future work he replied "I heard a writer once say, that he did not really write things, and much as he just wrote it down. Painting for me is a great deal like that, if I could articulate it with words I would not have to paint it. It is the need to manifest the internality of my own psyche. To place in the external world my own personal internal architecture, iconography, tropes and loci, connecting them together and seeing them in ways that my psyche does not naturally do outside of dreams, to the point that resolution was a foregone conclusion."

Since then he collaborated with different writers and created a lot of illustrations.

== Discography ==
=== Ganglion (2006) ===
Released under Suspicious Records label (CD Album).

No.	Title	Writer(s)	Length
1.	"A Necessary End"	Menton J. Matthews III	5:57
2.	"Giving In"	Menton J. Matthews III	5:22
3.	"Remember Me?"	Menton J. Matthews III	3:25
4.	"A Simple Test"	Menton J. Matthews III	5:29
5.	"A Hair On The Head Of John The Baptist"	Menton J. Matthews III	7:32
6.	"Blood And Milk"	Menton J. Matthews III	3:21
7.	"The Opening"	Menton J. Matthews III	2:49
8.	"Backyard Pond"	Menton J. Matthews III	3:00
9.	"Grafting"	Menton J. Matthews III	4:45
10.	"Praise"	Menton J. Matthews III	4:12
11.	"I'm On The Wrong Side"	Menton J. Matthews III	2:29
12.	"002 F#m"	Menton J. Matthews III	3:45

=== Monocyte (2012) ===
Released under Artoffact Records label (CD Album).

No.	Title	Writer(s)	Length
1.	"Abeo"	Menton J. Matthews III	2:34
2.	"Proxy"	Menton J. Matthews III	4:30
3.	"If Wishes Were Catholics (Vocals – Sarah Matthews)"	Menton J. Matthews III	5:15
4.	"The Right Of Action"	Menton J. Matthews III	5:01
5.	"They All Do It The Same"	Menton J. Matthews III	2:54
6.	"Gatekeepers"	Menton J. Matthews III	4:13
7.	"I Hate You"	Menton J. Matthews III	4:00
8.	"Forced Vision"	Menton J. Matthews III	4:29
9.	"Hollow"	Menton J. Matthews III	3:43
10.	"The Locus Priory"	Menton J. Matthews III	5:44
11.	"Veil (Vocals – Brianna (3)"	Menton J. Matthews III	5:15
12.	"To Kill A King"	Menton J. Matthews III	3:57

=== Monocyte: The Lapis Coil (2012) ===
Released under Artoffact Records label (Vinyl).

No.	Title	Writer(s)	Length
1.	"Proxy"	Menton J. Matthews III	4:30
2.	"If Wishes Were Catholics (Remix)"	Menton J. Matthews III	5:15
3.	"The Right Of Action (Remix)"	Menton J. Matthews III	5:01
4.	"Gatekeepers"	Menton J. Matthews III	4:13
5.	"The Locus Priory"	Menton J. Matthews III	5:44
6.	"Necromancy"	Menton J. Matthews III	3:00

=== Ascension (EP)(2017) ===
Released under Artoffact Records label

No.	Title	Writer(s)	Length
1.	"Following Evelyn"	Menton J. Matthews III	5:51
2.	"Flood (ft. Richard Walters)"	Richard Walters & Menton J. Matthews III	4:02
3.	"The Us We Do Not See"	Menton J. Matthews III	4:53
