= The X-Files Season 10 (comics) =

25-issue comic book series

Publication information
- Publisher: IDW Publishing
- Schedule: Monthly
- Genre: Science fiction
- Publication date: June 19, 2013
- Main character(s): Fox Mulder; Dana Scully

Creative team
- Created by: Chris Carter
- Written by: Joe Harris; Chris Carter; Karl Kesel (Year Zero, X-Mas Special 2014)
- Artist(s): Michael Walsh; Matthew Dow Smith; Elena Casagrande; Silvia Califano; Greg Scott; Menton3; Tony Moy; Colin Lorimer; Tom Mandrake; Matthew Southworth (Christmas Special 2014)
- Letterer: Robbie Robbins
- Colorist: Jordie Bellaire

The X-Files Season 10 is a 25-issue comic book series published by IDW Publishing. The title serves as a continuation of the television series The X-Files. Chris Carter, who created the television series, is the Executive Producer of the comic book series and also contributed several elements to the comics' stories. The issues are written by Joe Harris. In addition to the main title, several miniseries and one-shots written by Harris and Karl Kesel take place during the Season 10 storyline and supplement it. These include The X-Files: Year Zero and The X-Files X-Mas Special 2014.

== Background ==
In early 2013, it was announced that The X-Files would return to comic book form with the subtitle "Season 10". The series debuted in June 2013. Joe Harris wrote the series and Michael Walsh and Jordie Bellaire provided the interior artwork with Matthew Dow Smith taking over Walsh's art duties with Issue 11. The series continued the series' mythology, with the first arc "seek[ing] to bring the mythology of the Alien Conspiracy back up to date in a more paranoid, post-terror, post-WikiLeaks society." Furthermore, sequels to popular Monster-of-the-Week episodes are expected to be made.

Harris first become attached to the project after Chris Ryall of IDW Publishing asked him if he was at all interested in a comic adaptation of the series. Harris, who was an avid fan, was receptive to the idea and "holed up for a couple of days and punched out a take on the material". He then presented his ideas to IDW, who approved of the stories. Harris then had to seek approval from Fox, the owner of the series' rights, and "get them excited about the direction". Harris then met with series' creator Chris Carter, who agreed to be executive producer for the comics. Carter's job would be "providing feedback to the creative team regarding scripts and outlines to keep the new stories in line with existing and on-going canon."

Carlos Valenzuela illustrated the regular covers for the first nine issues, while Francesco Francavilla took over this function starting with issue #10.

== Publication ==
=== Issues ===
Title	Issue #	Release date
"Believers, Part 1^"	1	June 19, 2013
Writer: Joe Harris with Chris Carter		Artist: Michael Walsh
Fox Mulder and Dana Scully—now living together in Spotsylvania County, Virginia under the aliases Anthony and Dana Blake—are visited by Deputy Director Walter Skinner, who informs them that an unknown person hacked into the FBI and discovered information regarding the X-Files. Skinner is later nearly killed in his hotel room, whereas Scully is met outside of the hospital by one of her patients, the young Emily Van de Kamp who is acting as if she were possessed; Scully is soon surrounded and brutally attacked.
"Believers, Part 2^"	2	July 24, 2013
Writer: Joe Harris with Chris Carter		Artist: Michael Walsh
FBI Agent John Doggett investigates a pipeline that mysteriously explodes. Meanwhile, Mulder tracks down the Lone Gunmen—revealed to have faked their deaths several years earlier—who attempt to help him find Scully. Scully, meanwhile, wakes up in a cabin surrounded by the mysterious Acolytes. She is subsequently saved by the ominous Deacon.
"Believers, Part 3^"	3	August 21, 2013
Writer: Joe Harris with Chris Carter		Artist: Michael Walsh
FBI Agent Monica Reyes investigates William's adoptive parents, only to discover their dead bodies in William's room, revealing that it was some unknown entities portraying the adoptive parents. Scully learns that she is being protected by the Deacon, and that the pipeline that Dogget was investigating is carrying magnetite. Mulder is visited by the believed-to-be dead Smoking Man, who behaves extremely oddly. Skinner tracks down Emily, only to discover tell-tale signs of acidic green alien blood.
"Believers, Part 4^"	4	September 18, 2013
Writer: Joe Harris with Chris Carter		Artist: Michael Walsh
Mulder visits the pipeline believed to be carrying magnetite and deduces that Scully has been taken into the surrounding woods. Meanwhile, Scully is taken by the Deacon to a general store, where she is picked up by an officer, who turns out to be a shape-shifting Acolyte; he transforms into Mulder, and Scully crashes the car. In the woods, Scully shoots the real Mulder, believing him to be Deacon.
"Believers, Part 5^"	5	October 16, 2013
Writer: Joe Harris with Chris Carter		Artist: Michael Walsh
Mulder is healed by the Acolytes only to be tricked into thinking one of them is Scully. The real Scully, however manages to kill the impostor; suddenly she witnesses a massive alien space ship rise from the center of Yellowstone National Park, but begins to forget the encounter. She reports to an FBI review board, headed by Skinner, and argues that people with connections to the X-Files division are systematically being targeted. To counter this, the FBI decides to reinstate Mulder and Scully as federal agents.
"Hosts, Part 1"	6	November 27, 2013
Writer: Joe Harris		Artist: Elena Casagrande with Silvia Califano
Before they can remove the furniture coverings from their basement office at the FBI, Agents Mulder and Scully are summoned to a meeting and introduced to their new supervisor, Assistant Director Anna Morales, intent on streamlining the newly reopened X-Files unit. She sends Scully to Quantico, VA and Mulder to Martha's Vineyard to solve a case that has haunting similarities to their decades-old investigation into the Flukeman. Together they make dangerous revelations about the humanoid flatworm's ability to regenerate and procreate.
"Hosts, Part 2"	7	December 11, 2013
Writer: Joe Harris		Artist: Elena Casagrande with Silvia Califano
Mulder survives a massive Flukeman attack in the sewers beneath Martha's Vineyard thanks to Scully's surgical skills, but he has developed an unnerving psychic connection to the creatures, providing him with a greater understanding of the nature of the organisms and their connection to the 1986 Chernobyl disaster.
"Being for the Benefit of Mr. X^"	8	January 8, 2014
Writer: Joe Harris		Artist: Michael Walsh
Mulder and Scully ditch their reinstatement training after receiving a voicemail originating from Mulder's old apartment. The clues lead them to revelations about their enemies and the project code named Purity Control. Meanwhile, flashbacks shed new light on the motives behind Mulder's past informants and the source trying to contact him now.
"Chitter"	9	February 12, 2014
Writer: Joe Harris		Artist: Greg Scott
The agents pursue a missing person's case in Millersburg, Pennsylvania in which the prime suspect might be under the control of the Chittering God, a being that feeds on its victims' despair. But what Scully discovers about this entity might be less frightening than what she discovers about herself.
"More Musings of a Cigarette Smoking Man^"	10	March 12, 2014
Writer: Joe Harris		Artist: menton3 with Tony Moy
The man who spent his life hiding the truth from the public will now have to uncover it if he is to make sense of how he mysteriously returned from the dead.
"Pilgrims, Part 1^"	11	April 30, 2014
Writer: Joe Harris		Artist: Matthew Dow Smith
The shifting sands of Saudi Arabia have attracted pilgrims, consumed armies, and made men rich beyond their wildest dreams. But when an ancient weapon is discovered beneath a newly tapped oil field, Agents Mulder and Scully find themselves pulled back into a black game as slippery as the X-Files have ever revealed... and you won’t believe who’s turning up to join them.
"Pilgrims, Part 2^"	12	May 28, 2014
Writer: Joe Harris		Artist: Matthew Dow Smith
The dreaded "black oil" has been tapped in the remote deserts of the Middle East, and divergent forces are massing to contain, control, and even assist the deadly, sentient essence of Earth's once (and future?) alien colonists. But what does it want with Agents Mulder and Scully, what does a rising neo-Syndicate want with it? And why, where, and—most importantly—how is Alex Krycek involved?!
"Pilgrims, Part 3^"	13	June 25, 2014
Writer: Joe Harris		Artist: Matthew Dow Smith
“Black oil” has returned and along with it, the long-dead double agent Alex Krycek. In order to solve the mystery of Krycek’s return, Mulder and Scully seek help from the Lone Gunmen, who seem to have trouble of their own.
"Pilgrims, Part 4^"	14	July 23, 2014
Writer: Joe Harris		Artist: Matthew Dow Smith
Agent Mulder has been infected with black oil, playing host to an alien being seeking to use his knowledge, history, and expertise to unlock something mysteriously and terribly powerful. But Mulder and the would-be alien colonist possessing him aren't the only ones looking for it...
"Pilgrims, Part 5^"	15	August 13, 2014
Writer: Joe Harris		Artist: Matthew Dow Smith
Flying saucers, the Cigarette Smoking Man, the New Syndicate... this mind-blowing conclusion sets the agenda for the rest of Season 10. Don't miss the series that Geeked Out Nation says holds 'nearly as much quality and charm as its small screen predecessor ever did.'
"Immaculate, Part 1"	16	September 17, 2014
Writer: Joe Harris		Artist: Colin Lorimer
An abortion clinic bombing leads Scully and Mulder to investigate a right-wing extremist group helmed by a teenage girl who claims to hear the voice of God in her head. But her actions are far from heavenly...
"Immaculate, Part 2"	17	October 22, 2014
Writer: Joe Harris		Artist: Colin Lorimer
An abortion clinic bombing has led Scully and Mulder to investigate a right-wing extremist group helmed by a teenage girl who claims to hear the voice of God in her head. But her actions are far from heavenly... Plus, a special guest star you'll never see coming!
"Monica & John"	18	November 12, 2014
Writer: Joe Harris		Artist: Matthew Dow Smith
When we last saw them, Special Agents John Doggett and Monica Reyes seemingly met their final fates at the hands of the alien faction known as the Acolytes. Now in this one-off story, we'll reveal what actually became of them and what is in store for them next.
"G-23, Part 1^"	19	December 3, 2014
Writer: Joe Harris		Artist: Tom Mandrake
A government plot leads Mulder to ponder his early days as a cadet at Quantico, including his relationship with Diana Fowley and the fateful day that he found the iconic "I Want to Believe" poster. But the intrigue goes even further back in time, to when Bill Mulder was partnered with the Cigarette Smoking Man.
"G-23, Part 2^"	20	January 28, 2015
Writer: Joe Harris		Artist: Tom Mandrake
A government plot leads Mulder to ponder his early days as a cadet at Quantico, including his relationship with Diana Fowley and the fateful day that he found the iconic "I Want to Believe" poster. But the intrigue goes even further back in time, to when Bill Mulder was partnered with the Cigarette Smoking Man.
"Elders, Part 1^"	21	March 18, 2015
Writer: Joe Harris		Artist: Matthew Dow Smith
For as long as humanity has known of the alien plot to re-colonize the Earth, there have been men who would conspire to consolidate that knowledge, and the power that came with it, for themselves. But the "Syndicate" that long bedeviled Agents Mulder and Scully are no more, consumed and destroyed by those very secrets they kept... or are they? What new secrets will they fight and kill for? And what will become of the X-Files once those secrets are laid bare? The end begins here!
"Elders, Part 2^"	22	April 1, 2015
Writer: Joe Harris		Artist: Matthew Dow Smith
The 'Syndicate' that long bedeviled Agents Mulder and Scully has returned with old faces and a new leader.
"Elders, Part 3^"	23	April 15, 2015
Writer: Joe Harris		Artist: Matthew Dow Smith
The Syndicate has returned with familiar faces and a new leader. Their first order of business: shutting down the X-Files for good!
"Elders, Part 4^"	24	May 20, 2015
Writer: Joe Harris		Artist: Matthew Dow Smith
The penultimate chapter of Season 10! Mulder has come face to face with the mysterious leader of the resurrected Syndicate and learned many of its secrets. But will he survive the experience?
"Elders, Part 5^"	25	July 1, 2015
Writer: Joe Harris		Artist: Matthew Dow Smith
Double-sized finale of 'Season 10!' Clandestine plans come to a roaring boil as things heat up for Mulder and Scully, who will never be the same after this issue!

==== Hardcover Collected Volumes ====
Volume	Issues collected	Release date	ISBN
1	1–5	December 18, 2013	ISBN 978-1-61377-751-0
2	6–10	April 23, 2014	ISBN 978-1-61377-944-6
3	11–15	November 25, 2014	ISBN 978-1-63140-165-7
4	16–20	April 22, 2015	ISBN 978-1-63140-286-9
5	21–25	October 6, 2015	ISBN 978-1-63140-405-4

== Awards and nominations ==
Season 10 was nominated for two Diamond Gem Awards: 2013 Best New Comic Book Series and 2013 Licensed Comic of the Year (Issue #1).

Jordie Bellaire won the 2014 Eisner Award for Best Coloring based in part for her work on this title.

== The X-Files: Year Zero ==
In addition to the ongoing Season 10 title, IDW also published a monthly 5-issue miniseries called The X-Files: Year Zero beginning on July 16, 2014. Written by Karl Kesel with art by Vic Mahlhotra and Greg Scott, the miniseries fleshed out the origins of The X-Files as first alluded to in the season one television episode "Shapes".

== The X-Files X-Mas Special 2014 ==
Published by IDW on December 24, 2014, written by Joe Harris and Karl Kesel, art by Matthew Dow Smith and Matthew Southworth.
The holidays have brought together all the X-Files agents for the very first time! Walter Skinner hosts a get-together for his most special agents, but the festive night turns tense when someone—or something—comes down the chimney! In a second story, the X-Files team of the 1940s—Bing Ellington and Millie Ohio from the Year Zero miniseries—investigate a potential Communist saboteur, but discover an impossible creature—a gremlin!

== Audio drama ==
The Season 10 comic was adapted into a pair of audio drama mini-series, produced by Dirk Maggs for Audible. It featured the voices of David Duchovny, Gillian Anderson, Mitch Pileggi, William B. Davis, Tom Braidwood, Dean Haglund, and Bruce Harwood.

"The X-Files: Cold Cases" adapted the stories: Believers (70 min), Hosts (38 min), Being for the Benefit of Mr. X (25 min), More Musings of a Cigarette Smoking Man (23 min), Pilgrims (87 min).

"The X-Files: Stolen Lives" adapted the stories: Immaculate (41 min), Chitter (22 min), Monica & John (21 min), G-23 (40 min), Elders (98 min).
