= Collateral Damage (Millennium) =

- Millennium episode
- Episode no.: Season 3 Episode 11
- Directed by: Thomas J. Wright
- Written by: Michael R. Perry
- Original air date: January 22, 1999

Guest appearances
- James Marsters as Eric Swan; Jacinda Barrett as Taylor Watts; Art Bell as himself; Terry David Mulligan as Dr. Harvey; Terry O'Quinn as Peter Watts

Episode chronology
← Previous "Borrowed Time"	Next → "The Sound of Snow"
- Millennium season 3

"Collateral Damage" is the eleventh episode of the third season of the crime-thriller television series Millennium. It premiered on the Fox network on January 22, 1999. The episode was written by Michael R. Perry, and directed by Thomas J. Wright. "Collateral Damage" featured guest appearances by O'Quinn, Jacinda Barrett, James Marsters, and radio host Art Bell as himself. Bell's radio show Coast to Coast AM was among Perry's inspirations for the script.

In this episode, Federal Bureau of Investigation agents Frank Black (Lance Henriksen) and Emma Hollis (Klea Scott) investigate the kidnapping of the daughter of Millennium Group member Peter Watts (Terry O'Quinn), which may be connected to the testing of a pathogen during the Gulf War. The episode was well-received critically, with the guest acting seen as particularly strong, and was viewed by approximately 5.6 million households during its initial broadcast.

== Plot ==
Leaving a bowling alley, student Taylor Watts (Jacinda Barrett) is abducted by two men. As she is dragged into a car, her dropped purse shows that her father is Millennium Group member Peter Watts (Terry O'Quinn). Watts briefs FBI agents on the kidnapping, as a witness describes one abductor, who was wearing a mask like those issued to U.S. troops in the Gulf War. FBI agent Emma Hollis (Klea Scott) remarks to the agents that Watts failed to mention of the Millennium Group or those opposed to it in his briefing, and that her partner Frank Black (Lance Henriksen), who has been investigating the Group, is absent.

On an examining table, one of the kidnappers, Eric Swan (James Marsters), strips Taylor, harshly washes her with a coarse brush and photographs her. The picture is sent to Watts, who is seen looking at it while supervising the crime scene. Black is also at the scene and experiences a vision of the Gulf War. Evidence is found of military-issued tire and boot tracks, leading the FBI to an address where they find the second kidnapper murdered. Black and Watts clash over whether the Group or Swan are responsible. Back in the examination room, Swan exposes Taylor to a substance contained in a canister.

Black tracks the history of the second kidnapper, finding that he was involved in a military medical group; Swan's name is also associated with this group. Watts approaches Black, showing him a second photograph of Taylor, now looking sickly, beside the canister. Watts believes she has less than two days to live. Meanwhile, Hollis discovers that Swan frequently called Art Bell's Coast to Coast AM radio show under a pseudonym to discuss conspiracy theories about Gulf War syndrome. Bell invites Black onto the show to speak to a listening Swan; the two realize that Black's wife was killed by a pathogen Swan was ordered to test on his troops during the war—an order which came from a group outside of the United States Army.

At his hideout, Swan retrieves an antidote for the pathogen; meanwhile, Hollis has managed to discover his location. Black and Hollis arrive to find that Watts and Group members have trained a sniper upon the building; Watts speaks to Swan over the phone and agrees to release information confirming the Group's role in the biological tests. However, during this time, Taylor has freed herself and taken Swan's antidote; she ambushes him and breaks his neck. After she returns home, Taylor asks her father if Swan was right about Group's involvement; he does not answer.

== Production ==
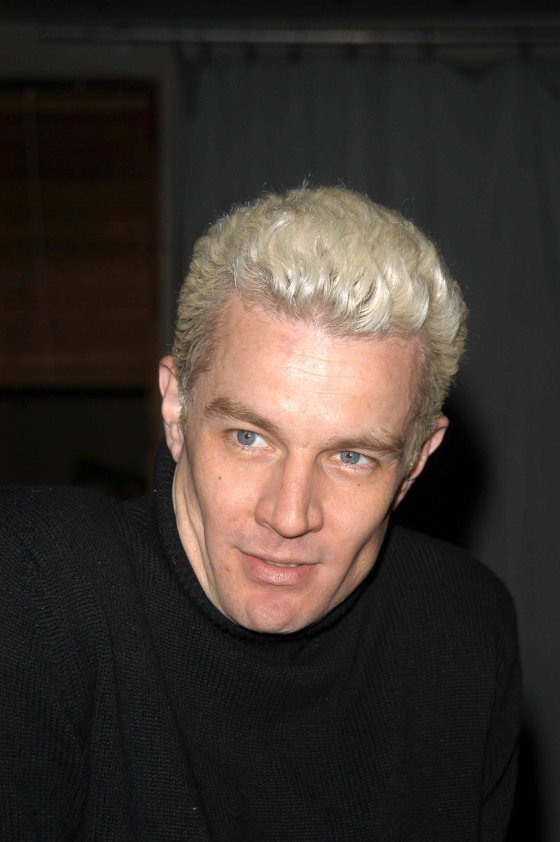
James Marsters, 2003

"Collateral Damage" is the fourth episode of Millennium to have been written by Michael R. Perry, who had previously penned the second season episode "The Mikado", as well as "...Thirteen Years Later" and "Omertà" earlier in the third season. Perry would go on to contribute one more script before the series' end. The episode was directed by Thomas J. Wright, who helmed a total of twenty-six episodes across all three seasons. Wright would also go on to direct "Millennium", the series' crossover episode with its sister show The X-Files.

Perry was inspired to write the episode due to his interest in conspiracy theory literature, which he finds interesting but does not believe in. The Coast to Coast AM radio show featured in the episode also served as an inspiration, and its host Art Bell agreed to appear as himself. Guest star James Marsters was cast immediately after his audition for the role of Eric Swan, and although several of Millennium's crew were fans of the series Buffy the Vampire Slayer, in which Marsters had a recurring role, Perry recalled none of them recognizing the actor during his audition due to the strength of his performance.

This episode marked a change in the presentation of Black's "flashback" visions, a hallmark of the series. Previously they had been depicted with a series of rapid and vague images; director Wright felt that it would be beneficial to slow these down and linger on imagery for longer, "so we could see a little more of what was happening".

== Broadcast and reception ==
"Collateral Damage" was first broadcast on the Fox network on January 22, 1999. The episode earned a Nielsen rating of 5.77 during its original broadcast, meaning that 5.77 percent of households in the United States viewed the episode. This represented approximately 5.6 million households. (Note: Each ratings point represented 970,000 households during the 1998–99 television season.)

"Collateral Damage" received positive reviews from critics. The A.V. Club's Emily VanDerWerff rated the episode a "B". VanDerWerff felt that the episode began with a formulaic and "manipulative" attempt to shock the audience with the kidnapping of a young woman, but quickly moved past this to introduce more interesting elements, particularly the nature of the relationship between Watts and Black. VanDerWerff highlighted the acting of Marsters, finding that he succeeded in making character of Swan into a sympathetic and complex one rather than a simple villain. Robert Shearman and Lars Pearson, in their book Wanting to Believe: A Critical Guide to The X-Files, Millennium & The Lone Gunmen, rated "Collateral Damage" five stars out of five. Shearman called the episode "magnificent", highlighting its in-depth take on the morality of both Black and Watts when faced with the issue of defending either their beliefs or their families. He also praised the guest acting in the episode, and felt that Perry's script was the first to adequately address questions raised by the series rather than simply asking more.

== Footnotes ==
=== References ===
- Carter, Chris; Perry, Michael R.; McLachlan, Robert, Johannessen, Chip; Horton, Ken; Henriksen, Lance and Scott, Klea (2004). End Game: Making Millennium Season Three (DVD). Millennium: The Complete Third Season: 20th Century Fox Home Entertainment.
- Shearman, Robert; Pearson, Lars (2009). Wanting to Believe: A Critical Guide to The X-Files, Millennium & The Lone Gunmen. Mad Norwegian Press. ISBN 978-0-9759446-9-1.
- McLean, James; Henriksen, Lance; Spotnitz, Frank; Carter, Chris (2012). Chamberlain, Adam; Dixon, Brian A. (eds.). Back to Frank Black. Fourth Horseman Press. ISBN 978-0-9883922-9-8.
