= ...Thirteen Years Later =

- Millennium episode
- Episode no.: Season 3 Episode 5
- Directed by: Thomas J. Wright
- Written by: Michael R. Perry
- Original air date: October 30, 1998

Guest appearances
- Peter Criss as himself/Nice Cop; Ace Frehley as himself/Sick Cop; Paul Stanley as himself/Lew Carroll; Gene Simmons as himself/Hector Leachman; Jeff Yagher as Mark Bianco

Episode chronology
← Previous "Closure"	Next → "Skull and Bones"
- Millennium season 3

"...Thirteen Years Later" is the fifth episode of the third season of the American crime-thriller television series Millennium. It premiered on the Fox network on October 30, 1998. The episode was written by Michael R. Perry, and directed by Thomas J. Wright. "...Thirteen Years Later" featured guest appearances by the members of the band Kiss, performing both as themselves and as minor characters.

In this episode, Federal Bureau of Investigation agents Frank Black (Lance Henriksen) and Emma Hollis (Klea Scott) investigate a series of murders on the set of a horror film—and realize that the production is based on a case Black solved several years earlier.

"...Thirteen Years Later" proved a difficult episode to produce, with filming requiring a large number of shots to be completed and the script to be adjusted on short notice. It has evoked mixed responses from critics.

== Plot ==
FBI agents Frank Black (Lance Henriksen) and Emma Hollis (Klea Scott) travel to Travelers Rest, South Carolina, to investigate the deaths of film director Lew Carroll (Paul Stanley) and Marta Danbury, the leading actress in his latest film. As the local sheriff guides Black and Hollis through the murder scene, Black realizes that the film is based on a real murder case he investigated thirteen years previously; he is shocked to learn that the true story is being sensationalized for the screen.

The pair interview the cast and crew as suspects, discovering that many would benefit from either of the deaths—producer Kenny Neiderman had been having an affair with Danbury; Rowdy Beeman replaced Carroll as director; Ruby Dahl and Ramona Tangent, whose roles in the film will expand without Danbury; and Mark Bianco, a method actor relishing the opportunity to meet Black, whose role he plays. Also questioned is Hugo Winston, the man whose partner was murdered in the earlier case and who is campaigning against what he sees as a disrespectful production.

The production continues, and after the filming of a pool scene the crew gather in catering; Beeman discovers a severed finger in his sandwich, recognizing from its ring that it belonged to Niederman. When the sheriff shuts down production, Black theorizes that the killer may target the crew's hotel. He and Hollis arrive to find the body of the film's publicist hanging from a rope. The next day, an extra (Gene Simmons) confesses to the killings; Black pokes holes in his story and discovers he is not a credible perpetrator. Regardless, production is resumed—and shortly afterwards, several crew members are found with their throats cut, while Winston's body hangs nearby in an apparent murder-suicide.

Black doubts that Winston is the killer, and while Hollis stays in the hotel, he visits the production's climactic shoot, set during a performance by the band Kiss. As he looks around him, the sheriff's body is thrown down from the rafters; as the pandemonium settles, Black realizes that horror films end with the leading lady being targeted—the killer is after Hollis. Racing back to her hotel, Black discovers Hollis fending off a chainsaw-wielding Bianco. Black is able to subdue Bianco after Hollis disables the chainsaw; the actor then explains that he lacked Black's insight and had to commit the crimes in order to see through the eyes of a killer.

== Production ==
"...Thirteen Years Later" is the second episode of Millennium to have been written by Michael R. Perry, who had previously penned the second season episode "The Mikado", and would provide a further three scripts in the third season. The episode was directed by Thomas J. Wright, who helmed a total of twenty-six episodes across all three seasons. Wright would also go on to direct "Millennium", the series' crossover episode with its sister show The X-Files.

The episode features guest appearances by the members of the band Kiss—Peter Criss, Ace Frehley, Gene Simmons and Paul Stanley—who each portray both themselves and a small cameo role. However, the band members insisted during filming that their roles be given an equal amount of dialogue, which led to Perry being asked to amend scenes on short notice and fax updated scripts to the shooting locations; ultimately much of this additional material was filmed but not used in the episode. Ace Frehley was also unenthusiastic towards his role, and requested to play a "300-pound black man" instead, wishing to wear a fat suit like those used in the 1996 Eddie Murphy film The Nutty Professor; he was eventually convinced that such a suit would take too long to fabricate.

Perry has described the production "...Thirteen Years Later" as being "one of the most gruelling" of the series' run, citing its abundance of stunt work and physical effects as the cause of this. Perry praised Wright for his ability to direct the episode within the usual time constraints, as he felt the number of shots involved was more akin to a feature film than a television episode. Guest star Jeff Yagher, who played killer Mark Bianco, is the husband of actress Megan Gallagher, who starred in the first two seasons of Millennium as Black's wife Catherine.

== Broadcast and reception ==
That Frank and Emma try to solve the case by watching horror movies is a funny idea, but only demonstrates that the likes of Halloween and Friday the 13th are engaging and suspenseful in a way that this clumsy farrago of in-jokes can never be.

— Robert Shearman on "...Thirteen Years Later"

"...Thirteen Years Later" was first broadcast on the Fox network on October 30, 1998. The episode earned a Nielsen rating of 5.4 during its original broadcast, meaning that 5.4 percent of households in the United States viewed the episode. This represented approximately 5.37 million households. (Note: Each ratings point represented 994,000 households during the 1997–98 television season.)

"...Thirteen Years Later" received mixed reviews from critics. The A.V. Club's Emily VanDerWerff rated the episode a "B". VanDerWerff felt that the episode's comedic slant was necessary within the wider series, as she considered Millennium's dark tone to be prone to unintentional comedy and that a comic episode provided an outlet for this. VanDerWerff found the script to be at its strongest when satirizing the character of Frank Black, but admitted that it "falls apart" when attempting to send up other subjects; she also felt that the guest appearance by Kiss felt unnecessary and contrived. Robert Shearman and Lars Pearson, in their book Wanting to Believe: A Critical Guide to The X-Files, Millennium & The Lone Gunmen, rated "...Thirteen Years Later" one star out of five. Shearman felt that the episode had the potential to be much better, but that "the whole concept drowns in overkill". He considered the episode's characters to be too shallow and its commentary to be too heavy-handed to fully execute anything meaningful; criticism was also levelled at the guest roles by the members of Kiss.

== Footnotes ==
=== References ===
- Carter, Chris; Perry, Michael R.; McLachlan, Robert, Johannessen, Chip; Horton, Ken; Henriksen, Lance and Scott, Klea (2004). End Game: Making Millennium Season Three. Millennium: The Complete Third Season (DVD). 20th Century Fox Home Entertainment.
- Shearman, Robert; Pearson, Lars (2009). Wanting to Believe: A Critical Guide to The X-Files, Millennium & The Lone Gunmen. Mad Norwegian Press. ISBN 978-0975944691.
- McLean, James; Henriksen, Lance; Spotnitz, Frank; Carter, Chris (2012). Chamberlain, Adam; Dixon, Brian A. (eds.). Back to Frank Black. Fourth Horseman Press. ISBN 978-0988392298.
