= The X-Files (franchise) =

American science fiction–thriller media franchise

- The brand logo of The X-Files, first introduced on November 5, 2000, in its eighth season
- Created by: Chris Carter
- Original work: The X-Files
- Owner: 20th Century Studios
- Years: 1993–present

Print publications
- Book: Literature
- Comics: Comics

Films and television
- Films: The X-Files (1998); The X-Files: I Want to Believe (2008)
- Television series: The X-Files (1993–2002, 2016–2018); Millennium (1996–1999); The Lone Gunmen (2001); The X-Files (TBA)

Audio
- Original music: Music of The X-Files

The X-Files is an American science fiction–horror media franchise created by Chris Carter. The franchise generally focused on paranormal or unexplained happenings. The first franchise release—simply titled The X-Files—debuted in September 1993 and ended in May 2002. The show was a hit for Fox, and its characters and slogans (e.g., "The Truth Is Out There", "Trust No One", "I Want to Believe") became pop culture touchstones in the 1990s. Millennium, a second series set in the same universe but covering a storyline independent of the X-Files mythology, premiered in 1996. In 1998, the first X-Files feature film titled The X-Files was released, eventually grossing over $180 million. A spin-off—The Lone Gunmen—was released in 2001 and abruptly canceled. Six years after the initial television series was canceled, another film—The X-Files: I Want to Believe—was released. In January 2016, a tenth season of The X-Files aired, featuring Carter as executive producer and writer, and starring David Duchovny and Gillian Anderson. An eleventh season premiered in January 2018.

In addition to film and television, The X-Files franchise has expanded into other media, including books, video games, and comic books. These supplements to the film and television series have resulted in significant development of the show's fictional universe and mythology. By May 2002, the franchise generated $1 billion in total revenue, $500 million of which is revenue from the television show.

== Television series ==
The X-Files, starring David Duchovny and Gillian Anderson, first aired on September 10, 1993. Originally following the work of Special Agent Fox Mulder, an FBI investigator assigned to the X-Files, a division tasked with the solving of cases for which there are no explanation. Special Agent Dana Scully, a shrewd medical doctor, is assigned to debunk Mulder's work, though as the two continue to investigate the unexplained and the paranormal, her own faith is also tested. Scully later works alongside both John Doggett (Robert Patrick) and Monica Reyes (Annabeth Gish). The X-Files is generally divided into two classes of episodes, the first, "monster-of-the-week", or stand-alone episodes, and the second, X-Files mythology, which follows a government conspiracy to hide the truth about the existence of extraterrestrial life. The series also stars Mitch Pileggi as Assistant Director Walter Skinner, William B. Davis as The Smoking Man and John Neville as Well-Manicured Man.

Millennium, aired from 1996 to 1999, stars Lance Henriksen as Frank Black, a skilled criminal psychologist who could predict the actions of murderers and serial killers. Investigating the horrific crimes, Black eventually became a consultant for the Millennium Group, which believed that the world as we know it would come to an end at the beginning of the new millennium; a job which eventually leads to the demise of his wife, Catherine (Megan Gallagher). In the third season, Black turns on the group and rejoins the FBI as a special agent, working alongside Special Agent Emma Hollis (Klea Scott) to solve brutal crimes within the FBI's jurisdiction. Terry O'Quinn appears often in the series as Peter Watts.

The Lone Gunmen, the third series in the X-Files franchise, follows the established characters of Richard Langly, Melvin Frohike and John Fitzgerald Byers (Dean Haglund, Tom Braidwood, and Bruce Harwood, respectively), in their attempts to compile conspiracy-theorist magazine. Far more light-hearted than its predecessors, this series also stars Stephen Snedden as Jimmy Bond, and Zuleikha Robinson as Yves Harlow.

The X-Files has crossed over with Millennium, The Lone Gunmen, and Law & Order, as well as The Simpsons (in the season 8 episode "The Springfield Files").

Series	Television seasons											Duration
Series	1993/94	1994/95	1995/96	1996/97	1997/98	1998/99	1999/00	2000/01	2001/02	2015/16	2017/18	Duration
The X-Files	1	2	3	4	5	6	7	8	9	10	11	1993–2002, 2016–2018
Millennium				1	2	3	Finale					1996–1999
The Lone Gunmen								1	Finale			2001

=== Characters ===
Character	Appearances					Actor	First	Last
Character	Series			Films		Actor	First	Last
Character	TXF	MLM	TLG	FTF	IWTB	Actor	First	Last
Fox Mulder	Main	Cameo (Note: The character of Fox Mulder appears in season 1, episode 18 of Millennium, though he is not portrayed by David Duchovny.)	Guest	Main	Main	David Duchovny	1993	2018
Dana Scully	Main	Cameo (Note: The character of Dana Scully appears in season 1, episode 18 of Millennium, though she is not portrayed by Gillian Anderson.)		Main	Main	Gillian Anderson	1993	2018
John Doggett	Main					Robert Patrick	2000	2002
Monica Reyes	Main					Annabeth Gish	2001	2018
Walter Skinner	Main		Guest	Guest	Guest	Mitch Pileggi	1994	2018
Frank Black	Guest	Main				Lance Henriksen	1996	1999
Catherine Black		Main				Megan Gallagher	1996	1998
Emma Hollis		Main				Klea Scott	1998	1999
John Fitzgerald Byers	Recurring		Main	Guest		Bruce Harwood	1994	2016
Melvin Frohike	Recurring		Main	Guest		Tom Braidwood	1994	2016
Richard Langly	Recurring		Main	Guest		Dean Haglund	1994	2018
Jimmy Bond	Guest		Main			Stephen Snedden	2001	2002
Yves Harlow	Guest		Main			Zuleikha Robinson	2001	2002

== Feature films ==
The first feature film, The X-Files, was released in 1998 in between the fifth and sixth season. It was intended to be a continuation of the season five finale "The End", but also be able to stand on its own. Season six opener "The Beginning" picked up where the film left off. The majority of the film was shot in the break between the series' fourth and fifth seasons. The film follows the actions of Fox Mulder (David Duchovny) and Dana Scully (Gillian Anderson) after their dismissal from the X-Files division.

Unlike the first film, the plot of The X-Files: I Want to Believe does not focus on the series' ongoing extraterrestrial-based "mytharc" and instead works as a standalone thriller–horror story. The film details ex-agents Mulder and Scully's search for a missing FBI agent. While Walter Skinner (Mitch Pileggi) makes a notable appearance, John Doggett (Robert Patrick) and Monica Reyes (Annabeth Gish) are absent from the film. During a July 2013 panel discussion at San Diego Comic-Con hosted by TV Guide, both Anderson and Duchovny expressed willingness to do a third feature film, but Carter was more reserved at the idea, stating, "You need a reason to get excited about going on and doing it again."

In June 2025, Carter announced that he is working on a director's cut of The X-Files: I Want to Believe which will restore the original horror elements which were cut from the theatrical release due to studio and censor demands.

Film	Release date	Box office revenue			Director
Film	Release date	United States	Other territories	Total	Director
The X-Files	June 19, 1998	$83,898,313	$105,278,110	$189,176,423	Rob Bowman
The X-Files: I Want to Believe	July 25, 2008	$20,982,478	$47,386,956	$68,369,434	Chris Carter

=== Characters ===
The X-Files stars David Duchovny, Gillian Anderson, and Mitch Pileggi, alongside Blythe Danner, Martin Landau, and William B. Davis. The X-Files: I Want to Believe stars Duchovny, Anderson, and Pileggi, alongside Amanda Peet, Xzibit, and Billy Connolly.

== Merchandise ==
=== Literature ===
There are three series of novels based on The X-Files franchise, one based on each of the three shows. During the run of the television series The X-Files, many books based on it were written and released, including novels based on episodes, a series of comic books from Topps Comics, and many "official" and "unauthorized" non-fiction books. Some of the novels, which were published in both hardcover and trade paperback editions, were adapted into audiobooks read by two of the series' stars, Gillian Anderson and Mitch Pileggi. Three X-Files books rose to the top-selling list over Europe and North America. These books were The Official Guide to The X-Files, The Unofficial X-Files Companion and The X-Files Book of the Unexplained. series of licensed tie-in comics based on The X-Files were launched in 2004, by Topps Comics, and in 2008 by the DC Comics imprint WildStorm. The Fox Broadcasting Network publishes the official The X-Files Magazine. In total, five novels have been based on Millennium, the first being a novelization of the pilot episode. Some novels were also released as audiobooks read by actor Bill Smitrovich. In 2015, a comic book adaptation of Millennium was released.

=== Toys and games ===
The X-Files spawned a large number of spin-off products. The X-Files Collectible Card Game was released in 1996, and an expansion pack was released in 1997. The X-Files has inspired three video games. In 1998, The X-Files Game was released for the PC and Macintosh and a year later for the PlayStation. This game is set within the timeline of the second or third season and follows Agent Craig Willmore in his search for the missing Fox Mulder and Dana Scully. In 2000, Fox Interactive released The X-Files: Unrestricted Access, a game-style database for Windows and Mac, which allowed users access to every case file. Then, in 2004, The X-Files: Resist or Serve was released for the PlayStation 2. This game is an original story set in the seventh season and allows the player control of both Mulder and Scully. Both games feature acting and voice work from members of the series' cast. A 12-inch Frank Black figurine was issued by Sideshow in the same mold as The X-Files characters Fox Mulder and Dana Scully earlier.

== Legacy ==
The X-Files franchise has influenced many series over the years and became a television touchstone of the '90s. The first installment, The X-Files, became an international hit and its two main actors, David Duchovny and Gillian Anderson, became international sex symbols. Series such as Bones, Fringe and Lost have cited The X-Files as a major influence. The series has also topped ranking polls worldwide, but most notably in the English-speaking world. Carter, Duchovny and Anderson celebrated the 20th anniversary of the series at a July 18, 2013, panel at San Diego Comic-Con hosted by TV Guide. During the discussion, Anderson discussed Scully's impact on female fans, relating that a number of women have informed her that they entered into careers in physics because of the character.

The two other series in the franchise have, on the other hand, made less impact. Millennium, while well received by many critics, garnered criticism for the episodes being similar to each other in content and themes. Variety magazine reviewer Jeremy Gerard, although his review was mostly favorable, criticized it for giving him the "nagging feeling" that it wanted to hurt him. Many reviewers noted the dark storylines of the series, which were constantly mentioned as a reason why the show never became widely popular. The spin-off, entitled The Lone Gunmen, lasted only one season due to declining viewership, although it too earned largely positive reviews.

On January 17, 2015, Fox confirmed that they were looking at the possibility of bringing The X-Files back. Fox chairman Dana Walden told reporters that "conversations so far have only been logistical and are in very early stages" and that the series would only go forward if Carter, Anderson, and Duchovny were all on board, and that it was a matter of ensuring all of their timetables are open. Season 10 aired in January and February 2016.

In April 2017, it was announced that The X-Files would return for another season and would begin production in the summer of the same year. Season 11 premiered on January 3, 2018.

Following Gillian Anderson's exit from the series Fox announced that there are no plans for a season 12.

=== Planned reboot ===
In 2023, Chris Carter announced that a reboot of The X-Files was in the works. The reboot is set to be produced by Ryan Coogler, known for directing the films Black Panther and Black Panther: Wakanda Forever. Coogler stated his mother's love for the original series is what drove him to choose the project. Carter has approved the project but is not involved. In an interview during December 2025, Coogler confirmed he is currently working on the reboot. The series is intended to follow the same serialized format as the original, with a "monster of the week" in each episode alongside an overarching conspiracy.
