= List of Millennium characters =

Millennium is a crime-thriller television series which was broadcast from 1996 to 1999. Created by Chris Carter, the series aired on Fox for three seasons with a total of sixty-seven episodes. It starred Lance Henriksen, Megan Gallagher, Klea Scott and Brittany Tiplady. Henriksen played Frank Black, an offender profiler for the Millennium Group (a private investigative organisation). Black retires from the Federal Bureau of Investigation and moves his wife Catherine (Gallagher) and daughter Jordan (Tiplady) to Seattle, where he begins consulting on criminal cases for the group. After the group's attempt to cause an apocalyptic viral outbreak kills his wife, Black returns to the FBI to work with new partner Emma Hollis (Scott) to discredit the group.

Black was one of the first elements conceived for the series, the remainder of which were fleshed out by Carter around his character. Black has been described by a producer as Millennium's constant, as the series' tone and direction changed around him with each successive season. Except for Frank Black, the series' characters have been criticized as one-dimensional, "generic" and little more than "symbol[s]". Television critic Robert Shearman said that the series featured "half a dozen actors who could be termed regulars [...] but without exception they remain functional ciphers".

The following is a list of characters who have appeared in five or more episodes of the series.

== Summary ==
Characters of Millennium
Character	Actor	Season		
Character	Actor	Season 1	Season 2	Season 3
Frank Black	Lance Henriksen	Main	Main	Main
Catherine Black	Megan Gallagher	Main	Main	Guest
Jordan Black	Brittany Tiplady	Main	Main	Main
Emma Hollis	Klea Scott			Main
Cheryl Andrews	C. C. H. Pounder	Recurring	Recurring	Recurring
Barry Baldwin	Peter Outerbridge			Recurring
Robert Bletcher	Bill Smitrovich	Recurring		
Lucy Butler	Sarah-Jane Redmond	Recurring	Recurring	Recurring
Robert Giebelhouse	Stephen J. Lang	Recurring	Recurring	Recurring
Lara Means	Kristen Cloke		Recurring	
Peter Watts	Terry O'Quinn	Recurring	Recurring	Recurring

== Main characters ==
=== Frank Black ===
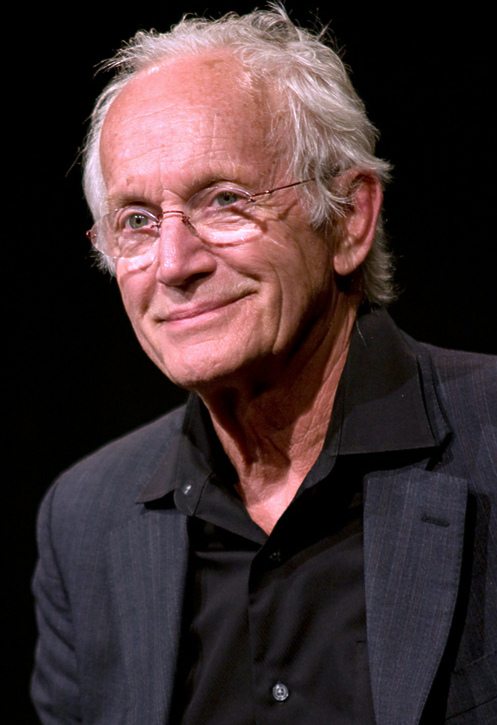
Henriksen was drawn to Millennium after reading its "vivid and edgy" pilot script.

Black (Lance Henriksen) began his career as an offender profiler for the Federal Bureau of Investigation (FBI). However, he retires when he discovers that his family are being threatened by a stalker who mails Polaroid photographs of them to him. Black moves to Seattle to consult for the Millennium Group, a private investigative organisation. Despite his career change, the stalker catches up to him and kidnaps Catherine. Black rescues his wife, killing the stalker. Disturbed by the abduction and Black's rage, Catherine moves out of their home with Jordan.

Before they can reconcile she dies in a viral outbreak initiated by the group, who are trying to bring about the end of the world, and Black returns to the FBI to pursue them. With his new partner, Emma Hollis, he finds himself struggling against the group's influence. Black is framed for the death of a fellow agent, prompting his resignation from the FBI and flight with Jordan to Washington D.C., and Hollis abandons him to work with the group. Several years later, Black works with FBI agents Fox Mulder (David Duchovny) and Dana Scully (Gillian Anderson) to foil a last-ditch effort by the group to orchestrate the end of the world; vindicated, he reunites with Jordan after the case.

Millennium's creator Chris Carter conceived of Black as an archetypal Western hero, describing him as "self-reliant, quiet, capable, dangerous" and comparing him to the title character of the 1953 film Shane. Although William Hurt was considered for the role early in casting, Carter denies that he was seriously approached for the part and calls Henriksen their "first and last choice". Producer John Peter Kousakis noted that Black was the constant throughout the series, as each season featured changes in tone and plot. Henriksen's performance was described as "the perfect actorly complement to Carter's thematic obsessions", earning nominations for the Golden Globe Award for Best Actor in a Television Drama during each of the series' three seasons.

=== Catherine Black ===
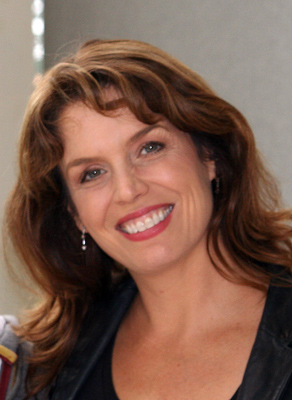
Megan Gallagher

Catherine (Megan Gallagher), a social worker, is Frank's wife. She moves to Seattle with her husband when he retires, unaware that their relocation was motivated by a stalker who was hounding the family. The stalker catches up with the family, kidnapping Catherine. Black rescues her, killing her captor. Repulsed by her husband's rage and disturbed by the incident, she separates amicably from Frank with their daughter Jordan. Before they can reconcile Catherine dies in a viral outbreak launched by the Group, sacrificing herself to ensure Jordan's safety.

The decision to kill off Catherine during the second-season finale was Carter's idea. Gallagher found it interesting for her character to give up her life for her daughter after the series had focused on Frank's sacrifices for his family. Catherine's character has been criticized for representing an idyllic "normal life" for Frank, instead of being a developed character in her own right; The A.V. Club's Emily VanDerWerff called her "more symbol than character" and "a weak enough character to become a passenger in her own story".

=== Jordan Black ===
Jordan (Brittany Tiplady) is Frank and Catherine's daughter. Although her father attempts to shield her from the disturbing nature of his work, it becomes apparent that she is beginning to share his precognitive abilities. Jordan survives the Millennium Group's viral apocalypse when her mother inoculates her with a vaccine obtained from rejected group member Lara Means, sacrificing her own life. After her mother's death and her father's obsessive quest to destroy the group, Jordan is cared for by her maternal grandparents and reunites with her father at the turn of the year 2000.

Carter recalled that Tiplady was the only logical candidate for the role, outshining the other actresses who auditioned for the part. Her relationship with Henriksen has been described as "natural and charming"; she was nominated for four Young Artist Awards as Best Supporting Young Actress Age Ten or Under, winning in 1998. However, Jordan's character has been criticized as "an effective symbol" and "about as generic a 'little girl' as they come".

=== Emma Hollis ===
FBI special agent Emma Hollis (Klea Scott) was introduced in the third season's opening episode, "The Innocents", and the young agent becomes Frank Black's protégée when he begins working in Virginia. She struggles to understand the criminal mind, since her sister was senselessly murdered by a man. Hollis has an estranged half-sister, Tamra, who is a heroin addict. She must also cope with her father's Alzheimer's-like illness, which may have been caused by the Millennium Group. Group member Peter Watts uses Hollis' father's illness to coerce her into cooperating with them.

Hollis was conceived as a "skeptical" partner for Black, to allow the third season to return to the stand-alone plot format of the series' first season. About Hollis, producer Michael Duggan said: "She's not a rookie ... but she's young enough to be in awe of Frank Black's rep as a legendary crime solver". Reaction to the character was mixed; she was described as "pass[ing] emotional baggage off as character development", and her introduction was said to be overly similar to the character dynamic in Millennium's sister series The X-Files. Scott's acting in the role was praised, with critics calling her "bracing" and noting that she "works hard to mine some sort of truth" from Hollis' character.

== Recurring characters ==
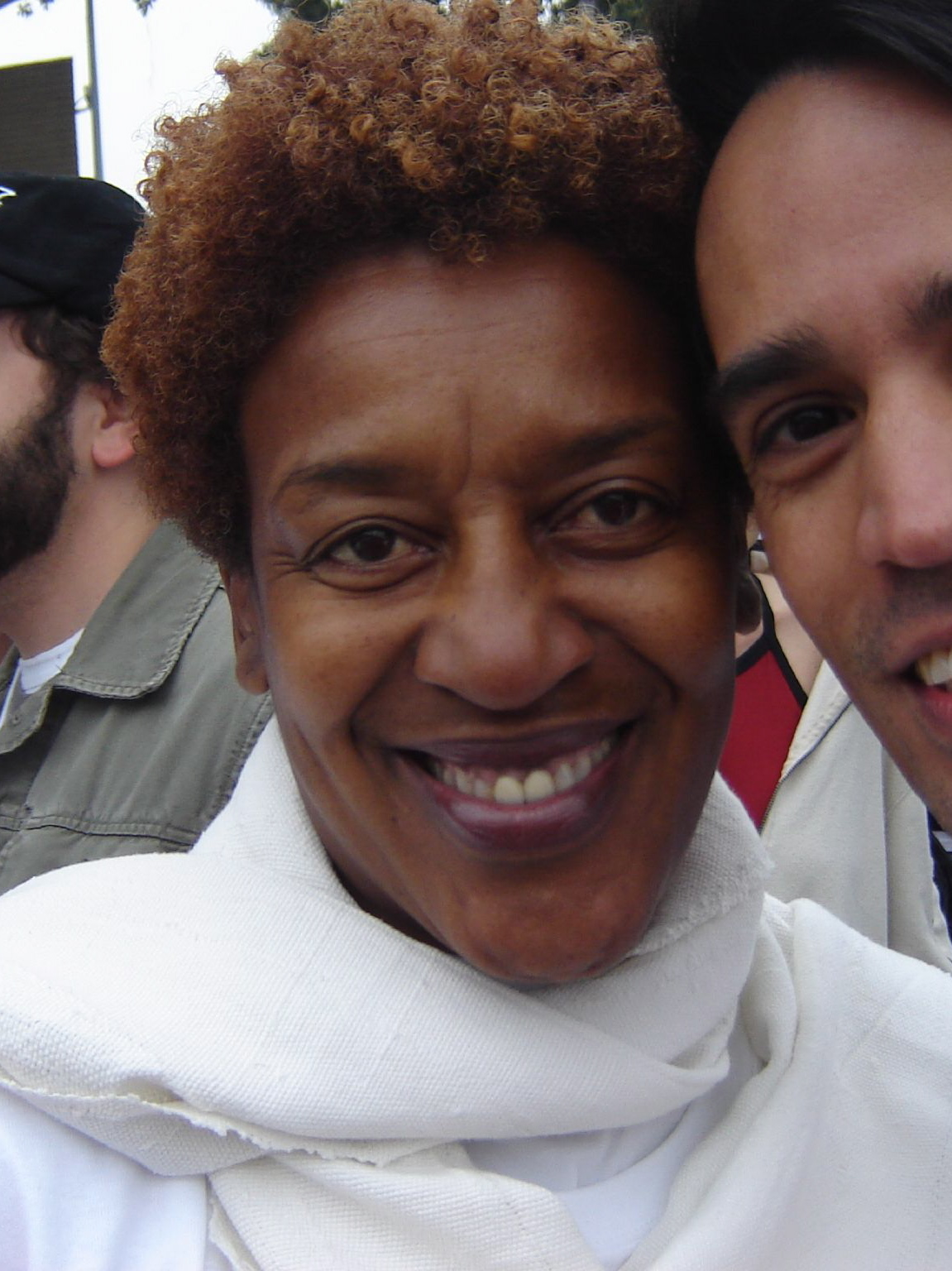
C. C. H. Pounder (left) appeared in several episodes during the series

=== Cheryl Andrews ===
Andrews (C. C. H. Pounder) is a forensic pathologist who works for the Millennium Group. Andrews turned on fellow group members Black and Watts during an internal schism, unsuccessfully trying to steal a holy relic for her faction. She is murdered by the group to keep her from divulging their plans.

Pounder's performance as Andrews was well received critically; the A.V. Club's Zack Handlen noted that she "manages to put herself across quite well" despite the difficulty of standing out from the series' sombre tone. However, he said that Andrews' villainy was inadequately explained. During an interview in 2015, Pounder confessed that her role on Millennium "is the one I hated."

=== Barry Baldwin ===
Aloof and arrogant, FBI special agent Barry Baldwin (Peter Outerbridge) works with Black and Hollis on several cases. During an FBI raid on the home of a serial killer whose brain was altered by the Millennium Group (triggering his killing spree), Baldwin is injured in an explosion. On the way to the hospital, he is murdered in the ambulance by a Millennium Group assassin.

Klea Scott called Baldwin an "unexplored" character, "excellently smarmy" and "a lot of fun to dislike"; Henriksen felt that Baldwin embodied "ambition for its own sake". Baldwin's character was described as "one of the least interesting additions" to the series, although Outerbridge's acting was "good".

=== Robert Bletcher ===
Lieutenant Robert Bletcher (Bill Smitrovich) is a detective with the Seattle Police Department's homicide division. Bletcher had worked with Black during Black's law-enforcement career, and becomes his liaison with the police when Black returns to Seattle. The detective is murdered by Lucy Butler when she breaks into the Blacks' house, and he is hung from a basement rafter.

The character's name was that of an attorney with whom Carter had worked; both men were "big, masculine guy[s] with a very outgoing personality". Bletcher was described by the A.V. Club's Emily VanDerWerff as a generic "nothing figure"; television critics Robert Shearman and Lars Pearson called the character "a functional cipher", noting that Smitrovich was not given leeway to invest much in the character until his final episode.

=== Lucy Butler ===
Butler (Sarah-Jane Redmond) is introduced as the hybristophilic wife of a serial killer pursued by Black; when the killer is murdered, Black realizes that Butler has been hiding her own murderous past. His attempts to track her lead to Bob Bletcher's death and Butler's escape. Butler is revealed as a demon, capable of changing form on a whim. She later reappears as a succubus, sexually assaulting Black in his sleep to frame him for rape and (as a large snake) trying to kill Emma Hollis. Although both ploys are foiled, Butler escapes.

Redmond, a fan of series creator Chris Carter and recurring director David Nutter, had auditioned for another first-season episode directed by Nutter. Although she did not get that part, she was contacted about a minor recurring role (which led to her casting as Butler). Butler's character was received positively by critics; her use did not seem like "rote horror", instead having clear motives and characterization. Robert Shearman and Lars Pearson, in their book Wanting to Believe: A Critical Guide to The X-Files, Millennium & The Lone Gunmen, found the character a good balance of the depictions of evil throughout the series: "something very strange and new and terrifying".

=== Robert Giebelhouse ===
Giebelhouse (Stephen J. Lang) is a homicide detective for the Seattle Police Department. Initially wary of Black's unorthodox approach to offender profiling, he comes to value his insight and seeks his help with difficult cases.

Giebelhouse was named by Carter for a family related to a close childhood friend. He noted that although the "hard-boiled detective" Giebelhouse represents seems clichéd, he felt (from his law-enforcement research) that type of character was "very real to life".

=== Lara Means ===
Means (Kristen Cloke) is a forensic psychologist and a candidate to join the Millennium Group. Like Black, Means has a nearly-supernatural insight into criminal cases (which she attributes to a guardian angel). When Means is prepared for initiation into the group the angelic presence forsakes her, leading to a mental breakdown as she shelters herself from the viral outbreak orchestrated by the group. Means gives Black her vaccine dose, which he uses to inoculate his daughter Jordan.

Means' character was created by second-season executive producers Glen Morgan and James Wong to "both challenge and reflect" Frank Black. The role was given to Morgan's wife, who had worked with the producers on their previous series Space: Above and Beyond. Although Means' addition to the series' second season was seen as positive by some critics, it helped make Catherine Black superfluous.

=== Peter Watts ===
Peter to me is, like, one of those un-character guys. You don’t know who he is. So many people I’ve played—and maybe it’s because I bring it to it—are kind of undefinable, whether they’re wearing the white hat or the black hat, whether they’re good or bad. He was just one of the first of those.

— Terry O'Quinn, on Peter Watts' morality

Watts (Terry O'Quinn) is a former FBI assistant director and a member of the Millennium Group. Watts is Black's initial mentor in the group, and they investigate cases together as partners. Although Watts' faith in the group is shaken when he discovers their responsibility for a deadly viral outbreak, he is reluctant to leave and fights Black's attempts to sabotage and expose the group's work. He convinces Emma Hollis to join the group, using a potential cure for her father's illness as leverage. After Watts leaks a folder of sensitive group documents to Black to aid his crusade, he is attacked in his home by an assassin from the group and presumed dead.

Carter called the decision to cast O'Quinn "a no-brainer"; the actor was cast without a full audition after Carter was impressed by a previous appearance on The X-Files. He summed up Watts' demeanour as "dry, articulate and matter-of-fact". Watts' character has been described as a counterpoint to Black; series writer Ken Horton described them as "two friends who both believe what they believe [...] and would love to convert the other to his way of thinking". O'Quinn described his time on the series as "rewarding", noting that his character often provided narrative exposition because Henriksen dislikes expository dialogue. His performance was described as "a fine job" and as having "always been good". However, Watts' depth of personality and inconsistent motivation (particularly in the third season) have been criticized.

== Footnotes ==
=== References ===
- Shearman, Robert; Pearson, Lars (2009). Wanting to Believe: A Critical Guide to The X-Files, Millennium & The Lone Gunmen. Mad Norwegian Press. ISBN 978-0975944691.
- Carter, Chris (2004). "Audio commentary for "Pilot"". Millennium: The Complete First Season (DVD). 20th Century Fox Home Entertainment.
- Henriksen, Lance; Scott, Klea (2004). "Audio commentary for "The Innocents"". Millennium: The Complete Third Season (DVD). 20th Century Fox Home Entertainment.
- Carter, Chris; Horton, Ken; Spotnitz, Frank; Henriksen, Lance; Gallagher, Megan; Nutter, David; Snow, Mark; Kousakis John Peter; Freeborn, Mark; McLachlan, Robert; Johannessen, Chip and J. Wright, Thomas (2004). Order in Chaos, Making Millennium Season One (DVD). Millennium: The Complete Second Season: 20th Century Fox Home Entertainment.
- Carter, Chris; Kousakis, John Peter; Henriksen, Lance; Perry, Michael R.; Horton, Ken; Wright, Thomas J.; Snow, Mark; Johannessen, Chip; Cloke, Kristen; Gallagher, Megan; Spotnitz, Frank and Freeborn, Mark (2004). The Turn of the Tide: The Making of Season 2 (DVD). Millennium: The Complete Second Season: 20th Century Fox Home Entertainment.
