= Millennium (The X-Files) =

- The X-Files episode
- Episode no.: Season 7 Episode 4
- Directed by: Thomas J. Wright
- Written by: Vince Gilligan; Frank Spotnitz
- Production code: 7ABX05
- Original air date: November 28, 1999
- Running time: 44 minutes

Guest appearances
- Mitch Pileggi as Walter Skinner; Lance Henriksen as Frank Black; Holmes Osborne as Mark Johnson; Brittany Tiplady as Jordan Black; Colby French as Deputy; Monnae Walton as Coroner; Octavia Spencer as Nurse Octavia; Stephen Ramsey as First Agent; Romy Walthall as Second Agent; Eulan Middlebrooks as Young Cop; Michael Dempsey as Sheriff; William Forward as Funeral Director; Marilyn McIntyre as Widow; Dick Clark as himself

Episode chronology
← Previous "Hungry"	Next → "Rush"
- The X-Files season 7

"Millennium" is the fourth episode of the seventh season of the science fiction television series The X-Files. It premiered on the Fox network in the United States on November 28, 1999. It was written by Vince Gilligan and Frank Spotnitz and directed by Thomas J. Wright. The episode is a "Monster-of-the-Week" story, unconnected to the series' wider mythology. "Millennium" earned a Nielsen household rating of 9.1, and was watched by 15.09 million people in its initial broadcast. The episode received mixed reviews from television critics; some felt that the episode's plot was creepy and engaging, while others felt that it was not a decent conclusion for the Millennium television series.

The show centers on FBI special agents Fox Mulder (David Duchovny) and Dana Scully (Gillian Anderson) who work on cases linked to the paranormal, called X-Files. Mulder is a believer in the paranormal, while the skeptical Scully has been assigned to debunk his work. In this episode, an associate of the Millennium Group—a secret society which believes the apocalypse will happen on the new year of 2000—resurrects the dead for use in bringing about the apocalypse. As a result, Mulder and Scully have to ask the help of criminal profiler Frank Black (Lance Henriksen), a man who has former experience with the shadowy group, for assistance.

The episode serves as a crossover with the series Millennium, also developed by the creator of The X-Files, Chris Carter, and was meant to bring closure to the recently cancelled series. The writers had a difficult time coming up with a story that would successfully allow Frank Black and Mulder and Scully to cross paths. Lance Henriksen later expressed disappointment with the episode. The idea to use zombies had originally been slated to appear in an aborted project X-Files remake of George A. Romero's cult 1968 zombie film Night of the Living Dead. In addition, the episode is notable for featuring Mulder and Scully's first romantic kiss. Thematically, the episode has been analyzed for its use of Biblical quotes from the Gospel of John and the Book of Revelation.

== Plot ==
=== Background ===
Frank Black (Lance Henriksen), the protagonist of the series Millennium, is a freelance forensic profiler and former FBI agent who possesses the unique ability to see the world through the eyes of serial killers and murderers. For the first two seasons of the show, Black worked for a mysterious consulting firm known as the Millennium Group. He lived in Seattle with his wife Catherine (Megan Gallagher) and daughter Jordan (Brittany Tiplady). During the first season, Black and the Group largely focused on various criminals. However, during the second and third seasons, Black began coming into conflict with the Group, which appeared to contain demonic elements and was focused on the fulfillment of apocalyptic biblical prophecy at the start of the new millennium. During the third season, Frank returned to Washington to work with the FBI following the death of his wife at the hands of the Group. In the third season finale, Black realized that the Group was preparing to come after him, and took Jordan from school as they fled Seattle.

=== Events ===
In Tallahassee, Florida, on December 21, 1999, a memorial service is held for a former FBI agent named Raymond Crouch. His widow is approached by a mysterious man, Mark Johnson (Holmes Osborne), who claims to have worked with her husband. After the other mourners have left, Johnson returns to the funeral parlor, dons the corpse's clothes and places a cell phone in the coffin. One week later, Johnson is monitoring Crouch's grave when his phone rings; he walks towards the grave with a shovel.

Subsequently, Fox Mulder (David Duchovny) and Dana Scully (Gillian Anderson) are called in to examine Crouch's empty grave. They notice damage done to the interior of the casket; Scully theorizes that the scene was staged. A briefing is held by Walter Skinner (Mitch Pileggi), who notes that Crouch is one of four former agents whose graves have been exhumed; all four men had committed suicide. Because of the presence of goat's blood encircling the grave, Mulder states that the crime was an act of necromancy. After the briefing, Skinner takes the agents aside and asks them to investigate Crouch's possible ties to the Millennium Group, which is now dissolved.

Mulder and Scully go to a mental institution in Woodbridge, Virginia, to visit Frank Black. Black is initially reluctant to help them, as he believes that any further involvement with the Group may hinder his custody battle for his daughter Jordan. When he finally agrees to assist, he explains that the four former members of the Group believe they can bring about the end of the world by killing themselves before the dawn of the millennium, acting as the Four Horsemen of the Apocalypse. Meanwhile, Johnson is changing a tire on his truck when a deputy comes upon him. Discovering Crouch's body in the back, the deputy attempts to arrest Johnson but is attacked and killed by a suddenly reanimated Crouch.

Acting upon information from Black, Mulder concentrates on trying to find Johnson while Scully is attacked in the morgue by the dead deputy; Johnson saves her by shooting the deputy before disappearing. The two agents put all their effort in to finding Johnson before it is too late. Mulder breaks into his house but is locked in the basement and attacked by the four corpses of the FBI agents, managing to shoot and kill one of them. Black shows up; after tying up Johnson, Black shoots two of the zombies. As his gun runs out of bullets and death seems imminent, Scully arrives and shoots the final zombie, saving both men. Black returns to the hospital, arranging to have himself discharged. Scully informs Black that he has a visitor and brings in Jordan. Dick Clark's New Year's Rockin' Eve is on television; Black and his daughter leave just before the countdown begins. As the clock strikes zero and the crowd begins to sing "Auld Lang Syne" on screen, Mulder and Scully kiss to ring in the new year.

== Production ==
=== Background ===
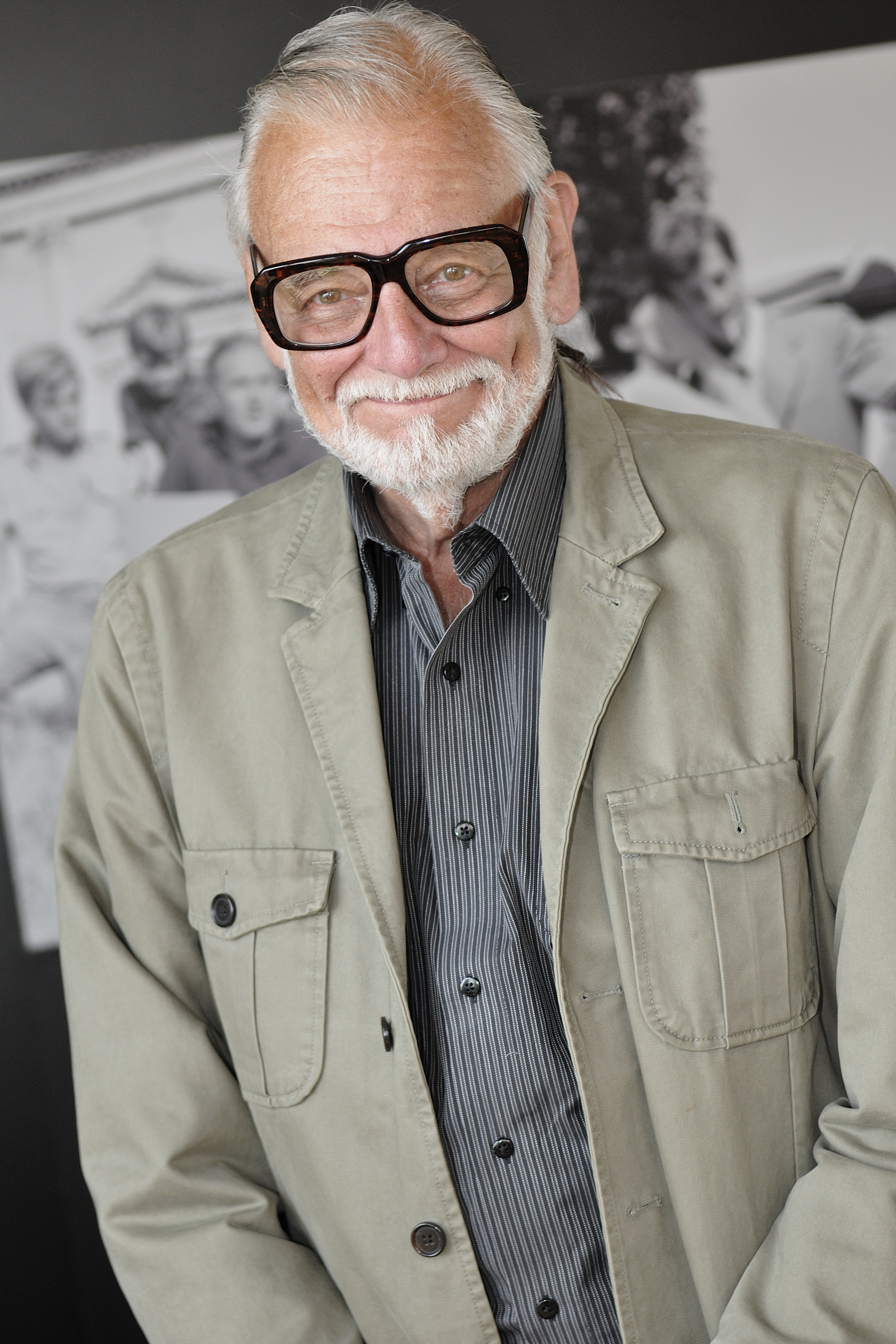
The idea to use zombies had originally been slated to appear in an aborted project X-Files remake of George A. Romero's (pictured) cult 1968 zombie film Night of the Living Dead.

"Millennium" serves as a crossover with the Fox series Millennium, also created by Chris Carter. Although Millennium, which debuted in 1996, had enjoyed critical acclaim, it suffered from low ratings and was cancelled after its third season. Unfortunately, the final episode of Millennium had been filmed before the cancellation notice, resulting in the series concluding on a cliffhanger. This episode features the last appearances of Frank Black and Jordan Black, and for this reason, is often cited as a way to bring closure to the Millennium series and its story arc. Incidentally, this episode is actually the second crossover between The X-Files and Millennium; the previous crossover involved a minor character—author Jose Chung—from "Jose Chung's From Outer Space", who appeared and was killed in the Millennium episode "Jose Chung's Doomsday Defense".

The idea to use zombies for "Millennium" arose from a separate aborted project. Reportedly, Stephen King, who had co-penned the fifth-season episode "Chinga", wished to write an episode based on George A. Romero's cult zombie film Night of the Living Dead (1968). Romero was also slated to direct the episode. According to "Millennium" co-writer and executive producer Frank Spotnitz, the staff of The X-Files met with both King and Romero, and the two showed an interest in producing the episode. While the episode was slated for the seventh season, it never came to fruition. Zombies as a plot device were then later relegated to what would become "Millennium". However, Mulder's line, "Shoot them in the head, it seems to stop them", mirrors a very similar line from Night of the Living Dead: "Shoot them in the head, that's a sure way to kill them."

=== Writing and filming ===
The producers of both The X-Files and Millennium had started to mull over the idea of doing a crossover when both shows were still on the air, and after Millennium was cancelled, The X-Files staff realized that a crossover made sense. Nevertheless, writing the story proved difficult, as the writers did not know whether to pen a story that dealt solely with wrapping-up Millennium, or if they should feature elements of Millennium intermixed within an X-Files investigation. The writers eventually went with the latter. With that said, Vince Gilligan, the co-writer of the episode, explained that he and Frank Spotnitz were more interested in "what would happen if Frank Black came into Mulder and Scully's world?" Gilligan also maintains that the episode was written to finally bring zombies into The X-Files universe. He explained: "It wasn't about the plot as much as getting [Mulder and Black] down in the basement of this creepy old house with these zombies climbing up out of the ground, and having to [shoot them] in the head." Gilligan also claims that the fear surrounding the perceived Year 2000 problem (that is, an issue for both digital and non-digital documentation and data storage situations which resulted from the practice of abbreviating a four-digit year to two digits) served as an inspiration for the episode. Gilligan later joked that he was "proud to say I never bought into any of that Y2K BS for a minute!"

Regarding the episode serving as a de facto series finale for Millennium, John Shiban said: "We realized that the story needed to be an X-File and that any Millennium ending we came up with had to come second. We needed to do what we always do, which is to follow Mulder and Scully through their case." For these reasons, Lance Henriksen, who portrayed Frank Black, was unhappy with the finished product, believing it to be a lackluster ending for the Millennium story. After the cancellation of Millennium, Carter called up Henriksen and asked if he would be interested in appearing in an episode of The X-Files that would wrap up the show's arc. Henriksen was excited about the episode, but when he received the script it was about zombies, much to his dismay. He noted that the episode's story was "a reasonable X-File but it's not Millennium." Spotnitz later admitted that the episode "was not completely successful, I suppose, but still seems worth it for having brought back Lance Henriksen."

The episode is notable for featuring the first actual kiss between Fox Mulder and Dana Scully. The series had featured other brushes with kisses between the two leads: in the fourth season episode "Small Potatoes", a shapeshifter, disguised as Mulder, nearly kissed Scully; in the 1998 film, the two's "lips brushed slightly before Scully got stung by a virus-carrying bee"; and in the sixth season entry "Triangle", Mulder kissed a Scully-lookalike from the 1930s in a reverie. John Shiban developed the idea for a Mulder–Scully kiss, which was described by series creator Chris Carter as a "present for the fans." Shiban noted that the episode's kiss felt like "the logical culmination of their relationship. They had been heading toward the kiss for years". Gillian Anderson later explained that, "David [Duchovny] and I knew the kiss was coming. [...] I felt the editors of that episode milked it in a very effective way." In order to create the atmosphere of the scene, specialized camera angles were used and everything was slowed down to make the scene last longer. The Millennium Ball scene was digitally created because the episode was filmed in October, two months before the event was scheduled to take place. Special effects producer Bill Millar was tasked with digitally adding the number "2000" into archival footage of the 1998 New Year's Eve show, hosted by Dick Clark. Clark was later hired to come in and record a voice-over bit announcing the year 2000.

== Themes ==
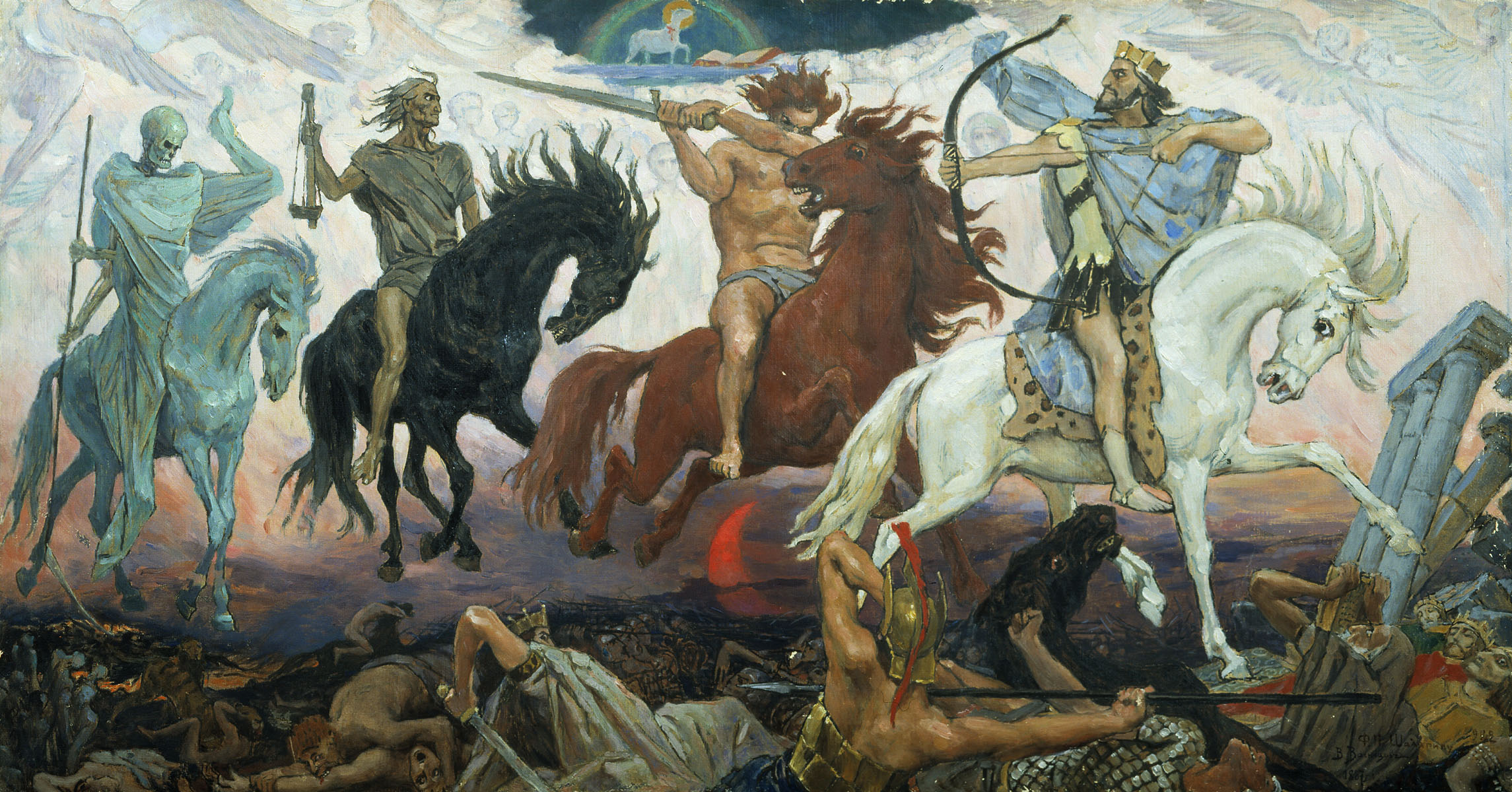
The four resurrected zombies are believed to be the Four Horsemen of the Apocalypse by the Millennium Group.

The episode makes prominent use of John 11:25–26 from the Christian Bible, which reads "Who soever liveth and believeth in me shall never die". These were the words that were believed to have been said by Jesus when he raised Lazarus of Bethany from the dead; biblical scholars have noted that the verse was also intended as a foreshadow of his resurrection. For this reason, the verse is used in the episode to represent a physical resurrection from the dead. However, Amy Donaldson, in her book We Want to Believe, notes that the verse is used for the wrong reasons in "Millennium"; the necromancer is able to successfully raise the dead by reciting the line, but only their bodies, resulting in mindless zombies. Later, the verse reappears in the eighth season episode "Deadalive" during Mulder's funeral. In this instance, the verse is used to symbolize its true intentions, and Mulder is returned from the dead, both in mind and body.

The episode also deals with the Book of Revelation, particularly verse 1:18, "I am he that liveth, and was dead; and behold, I am alive for evermore, Amen; and have the keys to Hell and of death". The Millennium Group believes that the four chosen members are the prophesied Four Horsemen of the Apocalypse; although the group believes that fate is predetermined, they believe they can help by "making it happen themselves". Thus, they commit suicide in order to be resurrected as the Four Horsemen. Donaldson argues that Johnson and the Millennium Group have taken Jesus' promise of eternal life and resurrection too literally, resulting in "a recreated cycle in this life rather than escape into the next". This is further proved when the four Millennium Group members return as zombies; they have achieved life after death, but only physically—not spiritually—by "abusing Jesus's words to take their fate into their own hands".

== Reception ==
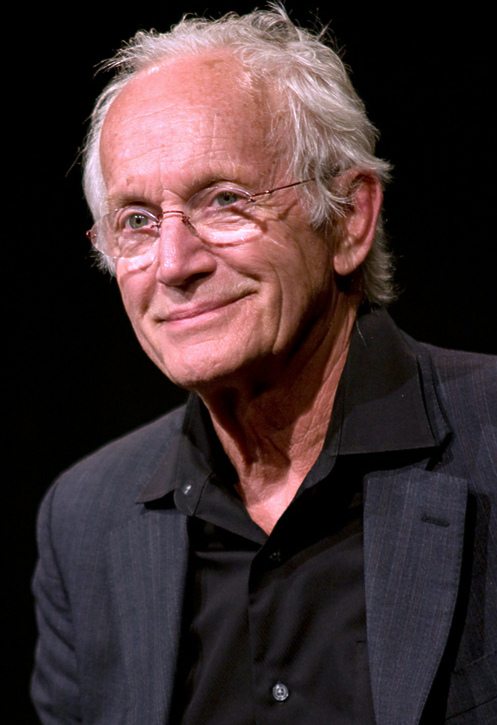
Before its premiere, the episode was promoted with a marathon of Millennium episodes hosted by Lance Henriksen.

=== Ratings ===
"Millennium" first aired in the United States on November 28, 1999, on Fox. The night the episode aired, FX showed a nine-hour Millennium marathon, featuring episodes that were closely related to and led up to the crossover. The marathon was hosted by Lance Henriksen leading up to the premiere. The episode was watched by 15.09 million viewers in the United States; it earned a Nielsen rating of 9.1, with a 13 share, meaning that roughly 9.1 percent of all television-equipped households, and 13 percent of households watching television, were tuned in to the episode. The episode aired in the United Kingdom and Ireland on Sky1 on April 9, 2000, and received 870,000 viewers, making it the sixth most-watched episode of the week.

=== Reviews ===
"Millennium" received mixed reviews from critics. Ted Cox of the Daily Herald called the entry "creepy" and "visually captivating", particularly praising the installment's "use of light and dark symbolism". Ultimately, he noted that "it's good to once again see Mulder and Scully temporarily set free from the show's overarching conspiracy." Rich Rosell from Digitally Obsessed awarded the episode 5 out of 5 stars and wrote that "there were a lot of big, big things going on in this ep [sic], starting with Millennium's ace profiler Frank Black [...] reluctantly helping Mulder and Scully solve the apparent suicides of four FBI agents." Rosell ultimately concluded that the reason the episode was a success was due to Mulder and Scully's kiss, a moment he called "inevitable" although he did note that "many think [it] really signaled the beginning of the end." Tom Kessenich, in his book Examinations: An Unauthorized Look at Seasons 6–9 of the X-Files gave the episode a positive review and called it "highly entertaining" and "cause for celebration". He noted that, while he had never seen an episode of Millennium, the series mythology and story-arcs "integrated seamlessly into this episode" in a way that non-Millennium fans could still enjoy it. John Drake of Xposé considered the episode "excellent" and rated it 5 stars out of 5. Drake commended Lance Henriksen's performance, saying that "not only provides continuity with Millennium, but adds a new dimension as Frank tries to leave the wreckage of his professional life behind". Zack Handlen of The A.V. Club awarded the episode a "B". He called the entry "tired" and wrote that it was "both too ambitious and not epic enough" to bring closure to Millennium. Furthermore, he felt that the story's basic plot was too confusing and almost laughable. Despite this, he enjoyed Johnson's role as the villain, calling him "interesting", and he wrote that the scene with Mulder and Black in the cellar was "kind of cool" because of the "creepy zombie sequences".

Matt Hurwitz and Chris Knowles referred to the episode as "controversial" in their 2008 book, The Complete X-Files. Kenneth Silber from Space.com was critical of the episode, writing that "this episode vividly demonstrates that what Carl Sagan once called 'the burden of skepticism' is no longer being shouldered by anyone in the series. Why else would Mulder's assertion that a necromancer has successfully raised the dead provoke such a languid response in a room full of FBI agents?" Robert Shearman, in his book Wanting to Believe: A Critical Guide to The X-Files, Millennium & The Lone Gunmen, rated the episode one-and-a-half stars out of five, noting that the episode's premise felt, "stylistically wrong for Millennium." Furthermore, Shearman argued the episode was "a terrible X-File" because, instead of featuring Mulder and Scully solving a mystery, the plot revolved around the two saving the world from Armageddon, which caused "the thin credibility upon which hangs the series [to snap]." Paula Vitaris from Cinefantastique gave the episode a negative review and awarded it one-and-a-half stars out of four. Vitaris noted that, despite the teaser and first act being "promising enough", the episode "slides downhill rapidly with a storyline that crosses the border into ludicrous."

The kiss between Mulder and Scully caused a furor of opinions. The Complete X-Files noted that many fans were "ecstatic" about Mulder and Scully's "long-awaited" kiss. David Blar from DVD Talk called the episode "shocking" because of Mulder and Scully's kiss, asking, "why they didn't lock lips sooner"? Paula Vitaris noted that the kiss "seems stuck on to the episode by a tack in its complete irrelevance to the storyline or Mulder and Scully in general." Allan Johnson from the Chicago Tribune noted that "in a way, it's too bad Sunday's episode of Fox's The X-Files is getting more attention for what happens near the end than it does for its plot." Kessenich praised the way the show worked in Mulder and Scully's kiss, noting that its lack of a "steamy, rip your clothes off" atmosphere made the sequence work "so well". Handlen wrote that the scene, coupled with Black getting his daughter back, was "the only scene which comes close to justifying the episode’s existence". Furthermore, he enjoyed the ambiguous nature of the kiss, noting that it could be "just a one time thing, or maybe it’s the start of something, or maybe it’s just a continuation of something that’s been going on for a long time now, right under our noses."
