= Millennium season 3 =

Millennium
- Season 3
- Region 1 DVD cover
- No. of episodes: 22

Release
- Original network: Fox
- Original release: October 2, 1998 – May 21, 1999

Season chronology
- ← Previous; Season 2

The third season of the serial crime-thriller television series Millennium commenced airing in the United States on October 2, 1998, and concluded on May 21, 1999 after airing twenty-two episodes. It tells the story of retired FBI Agent Frank Black (Lance Henriksen). Black had previously worked for a private investigative organization, the Millennium Group, but left after the Group unleashed a virus that resulted in the death of Black's wife. Now working for the Federal Bureau of Investigation with agent Emma Hollis (Klea Scott), Black seeks to discredit and expose the Group for their sinister motives.

The season saw the introduction of a new lead character in Hollis. Scott faced difficulty in securing the role, as Fox executives had desired a white actress for the part instead; Scott's agent fought for her to be given an audition, which proved successful. The season also brought in two new executive producers—Michael Duggan and Chip Johannessen, who had previously written episodes in earlier seasons.

Episodes from the third season have seen generally positive reviews from critics, as has the season as a whole. Stars Henriksen and Brittany Tiplady were nominated for several acting awards for their work on the season—a Golden Globe Award nod for Henriksen and two Young Artist Award nominations for Tiplady. In addition, series cinematographer Robert McLachlan was nominated for two American Society of Cinematographers awards during the season. Ultimately none of these nominations proved successful.

== Production ==
"We wanted to reduce it down to two people: Watts represents the Group, and Frank represents us ... Their struggle is of two friends who both believe what they believe, and each believes he is absolutely right and would love to convert the other to his way of thinking."

— Writer Ken Horton on the season's closing story arc

When ending the second season, the producers and crew thought it would be the last; Fox executives admitted that the decision to renew the series was "down to the wire". However, to their surprise Millennium was renewed for a third season. Many of the cliffhanger plot threads from the season finale were written off as the hallucinations of Frank Black. When creating the third season, the writers wanted to go back to the standalone storytelling format used in the first season; to do so they had Frank join the FBI and receive a new "skeptical" partner with whom he could work.

This led to the introduction of Klea Scott as Emma Hollis. Originally, the producers were looking for a white actress to play the part. Scott's agent campaigned for her and guaranteed the series' producers that if she was not considered for the role, he would never send another actor to the casting director of the show. Scott won the role, but producer Chip Johannessen recalled that "she wasn't what the network were looking, they wanted Heather Locklear or something to come. That was kind of how that went down." Fox backed down, and Scott got the role.

The season saw the introduction of Johannessen and Michael Duggan as executive producers; both had previously worked as writers on earlier seasons of the series. The pair worked with series creator Chris Carter, who acknowledged that they had taken heed of past criticism of the series when writing new episodes, wanting to avoid the previous "serial-killer-of-the-week" moniker the show had earned. To this end, the season ended with a seven-episode story arc intended to reduce the series' conflicts down to struggle between two men, rather than larger factions or groups—Black representing the viewer's point of view and Peter Watts (Terry O'Quinn) representing the ideals of the Millennium Group, with both convinced their beliefs are the correct ones and wanting to bring the other to their side. Ultimately, the season did not attract enough viewers, and the series was cancelled by the network.

== Cast ==
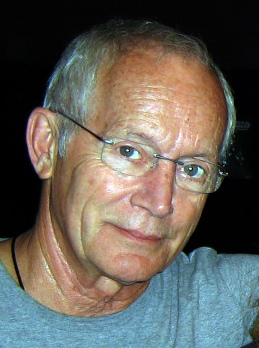
Series star Lance Henriksen

=== Starring ===
- Lance Henriksen as Frank Black
- Klea Scott as Emma Hollis

=== Recurring cast ===
==== Also starring ====
- Brittany Tiplady as Jordan Black

==== Guest starring ====
- Demetri Goritsas as Agent Dixon
- Terry O'Quinn as Peter Watts
- Peter Outerbridge as Barry Baldwin
- Stephen E. Miller as Andy McClaren

== Reception ==
=== Accolades ===
The third season earned several awards and nominations for those associated with the series. Henriksen was nominated for a Golden Globe Award for Best Actor in a Television Drama, losing out to Dylan McDermott's portrayal of Bobby Donnell in The Practice. Tiplady was nominated twice for the Young Artist Award for Best Performance in a TV Comedy/Drama – Supporting Young Actress Age Ten or Under; she was beaten out by Scarlett Pomers for Star Trek: Voyager in 1999, and Mae Middleton for Any Day Now in 2000. Cinematographer Robert McLachlan was twice nominated for the American Society of Cinematographers award for Outstanding Achievement in Cinematography in a Regular Series, in 1999 for "Skull and Bones", and in 2000 for "Matryoshka". Both times McLachlan lost the award to Bill Roe, for The X-Files' "Drive" in 1999, and "Agua Mala" in 2000.

=== Critical reception ===
Writing for Slant magazine, Keith Uhlich gave the season an overall rating of four stars out of five. Uhlich described the season as "a divisive run of episodes that, for many viewers, blasphemously rewrites what came before", but favourably compared it to the fiction works of Jorge Luis Borges. Uhlich felt that the episodes in the season were "challenging" and celebrated the abilities of the individual to forge a life for themselves. DVD Talk's Randy Miller also awarded the season an overall four out of five stars, finding that although its concern about the then-coming millennium made it very much a product of its time, it did not seem to have suffered from this and held up well in retrospect. Miller considered Henriksen's portrayal of Frank Black to have been "masterful"; however, he felt that the retcon of its second season finale alienated viewers and led to its dwindling popularity.

Robert Shearman and Lars Pearson, in their book Wanting to Believe: A Critical Guide to The X-Files, Millennium & The Lone Gunmen, rated several episodes across the season highly, awarding five stars out of five to "Borrowed Time", "Collateral Damage", "Darwin's Eye" and the series finale "Goodbye to All That". However, several episodes also fared poorly in their opinion, including "Closure", "...Thirteen Years Later" and "Forcing the End", all of which the pair rated only one star out of five. Writing for The A.V. Club, Zack Handlen described the season as suffering from several problems, specifically mentioning "its lack of a center, its hamfisted morbidity, the ongoing blahtastrophe that is [Emma Hollis]".

== Episodes ==
No. overall	No. in season	Title	Directed by	Written by	Original release date	Prod. code	US viewers (millions)
46	1	"The Innocents"	Thomas J. Wright	Michael Duggan	October 2, 1998	3ABC01	7.75
Frank Black teams up with an intuitive FBI agent named Emma Hollis to probe a plane crash linked to the spread of a deadly plague.
47	2	"Exegesis"	Ralph Hemecker	Chip Johannessen	October 9, 1998	3ABC02	6.93
The probe of an aircraft disaster leads Frank and partner Emma Hollis to an extraordinarily gifted psychic who is on the run from the menacing Millennium Group.
48	3	"TEOTWAWKI"	Thomas J. Wright	Chris Carter & Frank Spotnitz	October 16, 1998	3ABC03	6.88
An investigation of a deadly shooting spree at a high school is mysteriously tied to a powerful group of citizens setting its own agenda for the year 2000.
49	4	"Closure"	Daniel Sackheim	Larry Andries	October 23, 1998	3ABC04	7.59
The pursuit of a remorseless killer gets to Emma Hollis, whose fierce resolve to nail the slayer is tied to a violent incident that scarred her emotionally as a child.
50	5	"...Thirteen Years Later"	Thomas J. Wright	Michael R. Perry	October 30, 1998	3ABC05	8.25
Murders begin to occur on the set of a film loosely based on a grisly case from Frank's past. Rock band Kiss—Gene Simmons, Paul Stanley, Peter Criss and Ace Frehley—appear as themselves and in small roles.
51	6	"Skull and Bones"	Paul Shapiro	Chip Johannessen & Ken Horton	November 6, 1998	3ABC06	7.58
The discovery of secretly buried bodies at a construction site in Atoka, Oklahoma reveals an odious connection to the Millennium Group.
52	7	"Through a Glass, Darkly"	Thomas J. Wright	Patrick Harbinson	November 13, 1998	3ABC07	7.40
A missing 10-year-old girl in Pendleton, Oregon entangles Frank and Emma in an unsettling case that involves a convicted child molester, now out on parole.
53	8	"Human Essence"	Thomas J. Wright	Michael Duggan	December 11, 1998	3ABC09	6.78
In Vancouver, Emma takes on a drug case involving her half-sister, an addict who claims that new heroin on the street is turning users into monsters.
54	9	"Omertà"	Paul Shapiro	Michael R. Perry	December 18, 1998	3ABC08	7.19
On a Christmas holiday in Middlebury, Vermont with his daughter, Black is drawn into a case involving a mobster and two ethereal women with miraculous healing powers.
55	10	"Borrowed Time"	Dwight Little	Chip Johannessen	January 15, 1999	3ABC10	7.70
Strange fevers endanger Frank's young daughter, whom he believes is being stalked by a sinister man fascinated with near-death experiences.
56	11	"Collateral Damage"	Thomas J. Wright	Michael R. Perry	January 22, 1999	3ABC11	8.51
Tensions resurface between Frank Black and former ally Peter Watts in a search for the latter's daughter, abducted by an Army vet with a grudge against the Millennium Group.
57	12	"The Sound of Snow"	Paul Shapiro	Patrick Harbinson	February 5, 1999	3ABC12	7.29
Mysterious audio tapes trigger deadly hallucinations in the Seattle area, where Frank's investigation induces visions of his deceased wife, Catherine.
58	13	"Antipas"	Thomas J. Wright	Chris Carter & Frank Spotnitz	February 12, 1999	3ABC13	6.52
Frank Black's arch-nemesis Lucy Butler resurfaces as the prime suspect in a murder case that involves the supernatural and the demonic possession of a young girl.
59	14	"Matryoshka"	Arthur Forney	Erin Maher & Kay Reindl	February 19, 1999	3ABC14	5.6
The suicide of an elderly ex-FBI agent leads Frank into a case that uncovers dark secrets and Bureau intrigue at the dawn of the atomic age.
60	15	"Forcing the End"	Thomas J. Wright	Marjorie David	March 19, 1999	3ABC15	6.52
Leads in the abduction of a young pregnant woman from Brooklyn steer Frank and Emma to a mysterious plot hatched by a fanatical cult that is driven by Biblical prophecy.
61	16	"Saturn Dreaming of Mercury"	Paul Shapiro	Chip Johannessen & Jordan Hawley	April 9, 1999	3ABC16	6.45
Mystery surrounds Frank's new neighbors, a couple and their preteen son whose arrival coincides with erratic, often violent behavior by Frank's daughter Jordan.
62	17	"Darwin's Eye"	Ken Fink	Patrick Harbinson	April 16, 1999	3ABC18	6.56
An escaped mental patient with a violent past has taken an apparently compliant hostage, and their elusiveness on the run stymies Frank and Emma.
63	18	"Bardo Thodol"	Thomas J. Wright	Chip Johannessen & Virginia Stock	April 23, 1999	3ABC17	5.64
Eerie discoveries haunt Frank and Emma on a case involving Asian mysticism, Millennium Group machinations and incredible biotechnological advances.
64	19	"Seven and One"	Peter Markle	Chris Carter & Frank Spotnitz	April 30, 1999	3ABC19	5.60
Intimidations linked to a childhood trauma prey upon Frank Black, who is also beset by an ominous stalker—and by a hardened FBI agent who thinks he's gone over the edge.
65	20	"Nostalgia"	Thomas J. Wright	Michael R. Perry	May 7, 1999	3ABC20	6.54
A journey back to the town where she grew up is anything but a sentimental one for Emma Hollis, who is investigating a grisly serial-murder case with Frank and a sheriff she knew as a child.
66	21	"Via Dolorosa"	Paul Shapiro	Marjorie David & Patrick Harbinson	May 14, 1999	3ABC21	6.30
On the trail of a copycat killer, Frank Black is haunted by memories of the original fiend, while Emma is distracted by the deterioration of her father, an Alzheimer's patient.
67	22	"Goodbye to All That"	Thomas J. Wright	Ken Horton & Chip Johannessen	May 21, 1999	3ABC22	6.08
An ongoing search for a serial killer is marked by bizarre occurrences—and the disclosure of Millennium Group experimentation with radical brain surgery. Frank and Jordan decide to go into hiding, while Watts suffers a gunshot wound to the head that happens offscreen.

== Footnotes ==
=== References ===
- Shearman, Robert; Pearson, Lars (2009). Wanting to Believe: A Critical Guide to The X-Files, Millennium & The Lone Gunmen. Mad Norwegian Press. ISBN 978-0975944691.
- McLean, James; Henriksen, Lance; Spotnitz, Frank; Carter, Chris (2012). Chamberlain, Adam; Dixon, Brian A. (eds.). Back to Frank Black. Fourth Horseman Press. ISBN 978-0988392298.
