= Megan Gallagher =

American theater and television actor

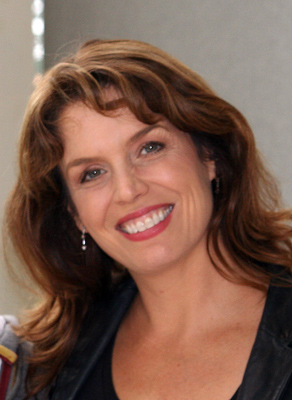
- Gallagher in 2006
- Born: February 6, 1960 (age 66); Reading, Pennsylvania, U.S.
- Education: Juilliard School (BFA)
- Occupation: Actress
- Years active: 1984–present
- Spouse: Jeff Yagher
- Children: 2

Megan Gallagher (born February 6, 1960) is an American theater and television actress. Having studied at the Juilliard School under the supervision of John Houseman, Gallagher began her career on stage, and has appeared in several Broadway theatre productions, winning a Theatre World Award for her role in A Few Good Men.

From there, Gallagher moved to Los Angeles to pursue acting in film and television; after making a screen debut in George Washington, she graduated to recurring roles in Hill Street Blues and China Beach, and starring roles in The Slap Maxwell Story, The Larry Sanders Show and Millennium. The role of Catherine Black in that series had been written with Gallagher in mind.

== Early life and education ==
Gallagher was born in Reading, Pennsylvania on February 6, 1960, to Aileen and Donald Gallagher. She was the fifth of six children. Her mother had also been an actor in her youth, retiring when she began a family. Gallagher credits her own career to her mother, who would take her to Broadway theatre productions as a child. She has also cited Mary Tyler Moore and Katharine Hepburn as influences on her career. She attended Wyomissing Area Junior/Senior High School, where she elected not to attend her high school prom in order to continue her rehearsals at a local community theatre, Genesius Theatre.

Gallagher moved to New York City to study acting at the Juilliard School under the tutelage of John Houseman. She then relocated to Los Angeles.

== Career ==
Gallagher began her career on stage, appearing in a production of Paul Osborn's Oliver Oliver before being cast in the 1989 Broadway production of Aaron Sorkin's A Few Good Men. Her portrayal of LCDR JoAnne Galloway in the latter production earned her a Theatre World Award, and an Outer Critics Circle Award. In 1993, she took part in Broadway productions of both parts of Angels in America: A Gay Fantasia on National Themes—Millennium Approaches and Perestroika.

Gallagher's television debut was in the miniseries George Washington. She gained the lead role in the pilot At Your Service, and a guest spot in the first episode of L.A. Law. She then went on to appear as a series regular towards the end of Hill Street Blues' run followed by a series regular role on The Slap Maxwell Story before going on to become a series regular in the second season of China Beach; she still maintains a friendship with China Beach co-star Robert Picardo. Gallagher's role of Catherine Black in Millennium had been written by creator Chris Carter with her in mind specifically, as he had been impressed with her work as Jeannie Sanders on The Larry Sanders Show. Gallagher was also keen to work with Carter, having admired his creation of the character Dana Scully for The X-Files, whom she saw as a positive example of an intriguing female character on television. Gallagher also appeared in the legal drama Suits, acting alongside her Juilliard classmate Wendell Pierce.

== Personal life ==
Gallagher is married to actor Jeff Yagher, and has two children, who are twins. She is related by marriage to actress Catherine Hicks and make-up artist Kevin Yagher.

== Filmography ==
=== Film ===
Year	Film	Role
1990	The Ambulance	Sandra Malloy
1991	In a Strangers Hand	Laura McKillin
1995	Breaking Free	Annie Sobel
1996	Crosscut	Annie Hennessey
2001	Blind Obsession	Rebecca Rose
2002	Contagion	Dr. Diane Landis
2002	Van Wilder	Holyoake Hottie
2003	Inhabited	Meg Russel
2005	Mr. & Mrs. Smith	40s Woman
2011	Alyce Kills	Ginny
2015	Get a Job	Abbey
2017	Last Rampage	Mrs. Cooper

=== Television ===
Year	Title	Role
1984	Sins of the Past	Ellen Easton
1984	George Washington	Peggy Shippen
1986	L.A. Law	Leslie Aaron
1986	Hill Street Blues	Tina Russo
1987	The Slap Maxwell Story	Judy Ralston
1989	Champagne Charlie	Pauline
1989	China Beach	Wayloo Marie Holmes
1991	Law & Order	Monica Devries
1991	Blossom	Arlene
1991	Pacific Station	Sandy Calloway
1991	...And then She Was Gone	Laura McKillin
1992	The Larry Sanders Show	Jeannie Sanders
1993	Picket Fences	Sydney Hall
1993	Empty Nest	Heather Cook
1993	Star Trek: Deep Space Nine	Nurse Garland / Mareel
1995	Nowhere Man	Alyson Veil
1996	ER	Kathy Snyder
1996	Millennium	Catherine Black
1998	The Christmas Takeover	Elyse Madison
1999	The Outer Limits	Terry Russo
1999	Lethal Vows	Lorraine Farris
2000	Chicken Soup for the Soul	Carrie
2000	Star Trek: Voyager	Lt. Jaryn
2001	Family Law	Jamie Washington
2002	Without a Trace	Mrs. Freedman
2003	The District	Dr. Cherry
2003	1st to Die	Jill Barnhart
2004	Life as We Know It	Leslie Miller
2006	7th Heaven	Rose's Mom
2007	24	Jillian Wallace
2010	The Mentalist	May Nelson
2013	Suits	Laura Zane
2017	Double Mommy	Tricia Bell
2017	Designated Survivor	Alice Rowland

== Footnotes ==
=== References ===
- Genge, N. E. (1997). Millennium: The Unofficial Companion. Century. ISBN 0-7126-7833-6.
- McLean, James; Henriksen, Lance; Spotnitz, Frank; Carter, Chris (2012). Chamberlain, Adam; Dixon, Brian A. (eds.). Back to Frank Black. Fourth Horseman Press. ISBN 978-0988392298.
