= Robert McLachlan (cinematographer) =

Canadian cinematographer

- Born: March 23, 1956 (age 70); San Francisco, California, U.S.
- Education: Simon Fraser University
- Occupation: Cinematographer
- Years active: 1985–present
- Spouse: Robin Griffin

Robert McLachlan A.S.C., C.S.C. is a Canadian cinematographer. A successful cyclist in his youth, McLachlan quit the sport to take up cinematography, and entered the field after studying at Simon Fraser University, McLachlan was mentored by Richard Leiterman. His professional career began with documentary work for Greenpeace, before he became involved in both television and feature films; his work has subsequently earned him several industry awards and award nominations.

McLachlan, who was inspired by both his father's photography and his own appreciation for the films Butch Cassidy and the Sundance Kid and Walkabout to choose his career path, would go on to find recognition as the chief cinematographer for the television series Millennium, for which he was scouted specifically. McLachlan's style on this series led to several industry awards and briefly became popular in the medium, as well as leading him directly to future work on Game of Thrones. He founded the documentary production company Omni Film Productions in the 1970s, later selling his share of the company.

== Early life and education ==
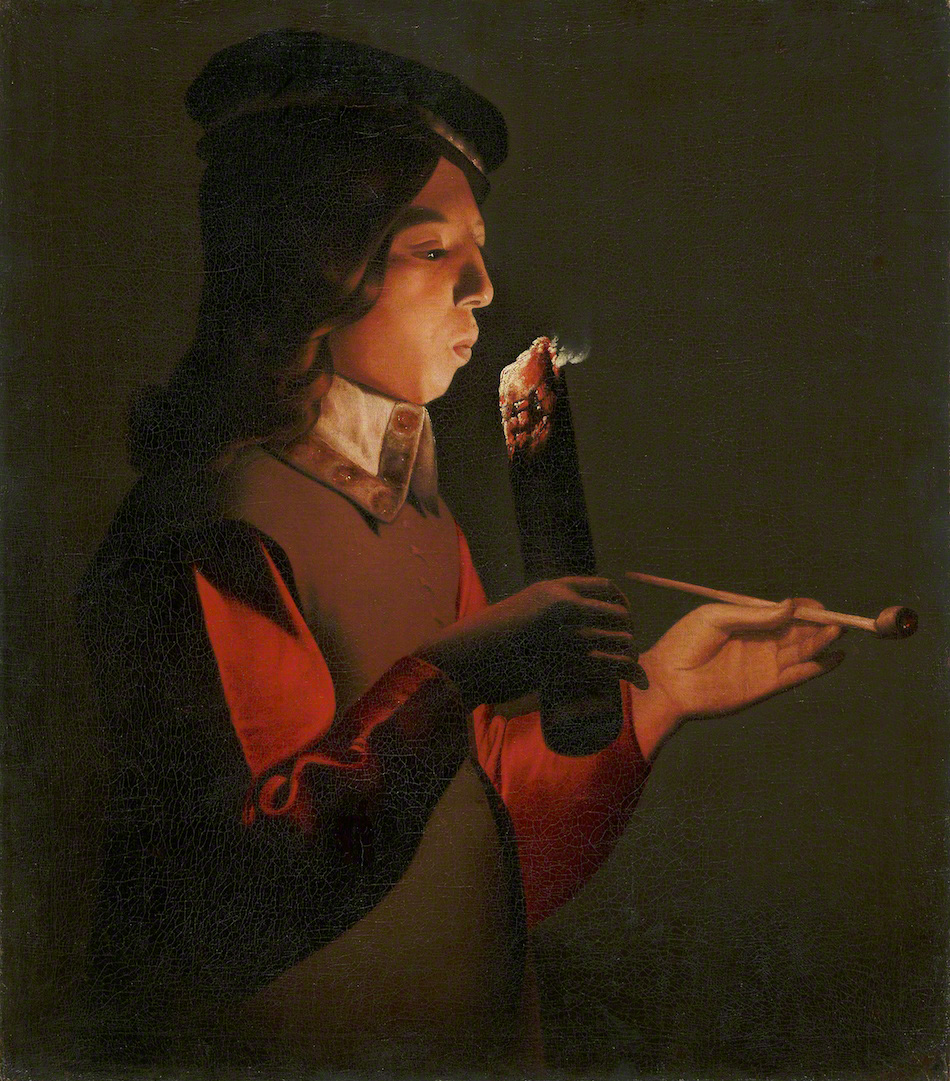
McLachlan has cited the works of Georges de La Tour (Le Souffleur à la pipe, 1646, pictured) as an influence

In his youth, McLachlan was an avid cyclist. During his teenage years, he trained upwards of six hours a day, and won several national championships in the sport. He qualified to represent Canada in the 1976 Summer Olympics, but the lack of funding for cycling in North America at the time would have necessitated him funding his own journey and leaving school to do so. McLachlan opted instead to remain in education and focus on his interest in photography.

McLachlan first became interested in cinematography after viewing the 1969 film Butch Cassidy and the Sundance Kid; Nicolas Roeg's work on the 1971 film Walkabout further cemented his interest in the field. McLachlan was also motivated by his father, who was an avid photographer. An early school assignment to create a Super 8 film project, for which he received an A grade, also proved a formative influence.

McLachlan studied fine art at the University of British Columbia for a year, before changing courses to attend classes at Simon Fraser University's film department. His education focused on the documentary style of John Grierson; however, when he began work in 1987, he was mentored by Richard Leiterman. McLachlan also cites influences outside the field of cinematography, drawing influence from the chiaroscuro, Dutch art and pre-Raphaelite movements of visual art, and the works of Andrew Wyeth and Georges de La Tour in particular.

== Career ==
Having graduated, McLachlan and Michael Chechik founded the production company Omni Film Productions in 1979, and began to work with Greenpeace, filming documentary footage on a range of subjects. McLachlan narrowly avoided trouble on several of these shoots, finding himself arrested for filming too close to an Exxon oil tanker and scarcely missing being assaulted by trophy hunters in British Columbia. McLachlan would later sell his stake in Omni, but remains proud of their documentary work. At the time, McLachlan was unsuccessful in joining an industry union, relegating his work to advertising and small-scale productions; his first union-backed project was on the revival of the television series Sea Hunt.

McLachlan found success on the Fox television series Millennium, earning several awards for his work on the show. He was head-hunted for the series by its creator Chris Carter, who had seen his work on the series Strange Luck. McLachlan was initially offered a position shooting Carter's other active series, The X-Files, then in its third season, but was unable to start work in time. He developed a distinctive style for the series, shooting it with desaturated colours and lighting scenes as though they were to be filmed in black and white; he also made use of high-intensity strobe lighting usually employed for advertising and macro cinematography. McLachlan has noted that this style briefly became popular after the series' broadcast but that other cinematographers had difficulty adjusting to it.

Having worked on Millennium with director David Nutter, McLachlan was able to parley this connection into a role on the HBO fantasy series Game of Thrones. McLachlan has called working on the show's ten-person cinematography team "a major logistical challenge", noting the complexity of its out-of-sequence filming schedules as something unseen on a television series before. McLachlan has also worked on the programme Ray Donovan, and has based that series' cinematography on both film noir aesthetics and those of 1970s cinema, specifically citing The Long Goodbye, The Parallax View and All the President's Men, as well as the work of Gordon Willis.

== Filmography ==
=== Film ===
Year	Title	Director
1986	Abducted	Boon Collins
1992	Impolite	David Hauka
1992	Ellen's Story	Robert A. Duncan
2000	Final Destination	James Wong
2001	The One	James Wong
2003	Willard	Glen Morgan
2005	Cursed	Wes Craven
2005	King's Ransom	Jeffrey W. Byrd
2006	Final Destination 3	James Wong
2006	Black Christmas	Glen Morgan
2009	Dragonball Evolution	James Wong
2021	Nightbooks	David Yarovesky

=== Television ===
Year	Title	Director	Notes
1988-1990	The Beachcombers		19 episodes
1989-1995	Neon Rider		
1991-1994	Northwood		29 episodes
1991	MacGyver	Michael Preece	Episodes "Trail of Tears" and "Hind-Sight"
1991	Max Glick		Season 2
1992	The Odyssey		12 episodes
1993	Cobra	Brad Turner	Episode "Push It"
1993-1995	The Commish		45 episodes
1995	Strange Luck		16 episodes
1996-1999	Millennium		65 episodes
2001	The Lone Gunmen	Rob Bowman	Episode "Pilot"
2002	Pasadena	Sanford Bookstaver; Roy H. Wagner	Episodes "The Truth Hurts" and "A Lie Worth Fighting For"
2003	Out of Order	Henry Bromell; Tim Hunter; Roger Kumble; Wayne Powers	4 episodes
2003	Tarzan	David Nutter; David Solomon; Perry Lang	4 episodes
2003	Tru Calling	Phillip Noyce	Episode "Pilot"
2007	Bionic Woman	Tim Matheson; Steve Boyum; Paul Shapiro	3 episodes
2009	Harper's Island		All 13 episodes
2011	Human Target		24 episodes
2011	The Secret Circle		21 episodes
2013	King & Maxwell		8 episodes
2013-2017	Game of Thrones	David Nutter; Michelle MacLaren; Matt Shakman	8 episodes
2013-2019	Ray Donovan		54 episodes
2016	Westworld	Neil Marshall; Jonny Campbell; Frederick E. O. Toye; Stephen Williams	4 episodes
2019	Batwoman	Marcos Siega	Episode "Pilot"
2020	Lovecraft Country		6 episodes
2022	Shining Girls	Michelle MacLaren; Elisabeth Moss	4 episodes
2022	American Gigolo		7 episodes
2023	1923	Guy Ferland	Episodes "Ghost of Zebrina" and "One Ocean Closer to Destiny"
2024	Yellowstone	Taylor Sheridan	Episode "Life Is a Promise"
2024-2025	Landman	Taylor Sheridan; Michael Friedman; Stephen Kay	6 episodes

TV movies

Year	Title	Director
1989	What's Wrong with Neil?	Brad Turner
1993	Adrift	Christian Duguay
1993	Other Women's Children	Anne Wheeler
1995	When the Vows Break	Eric Till
1996	Abduction of Innocence	James A. Contner
1996	Murder at My Door	Eric Till
2000	A Vision of Murder: The Story of Donielle	Donald Wrye
2000	The New Adventures of Spin and Marty: Suspect Behavior	Rusty Cundieff
2000	High Noon	Rod Hardy
2002	The New Beachcombers	Brad Turner
2004	The Robinsons: Lost in Space	John Woo
2005	Once Upon a Mattress	Kathleen Marshall
2006	A Little Thing Called Murder	Richard Benjamin
2010	The Boy Who Cried Werewolf	Eric Bross
2010	Betwixt	Christian Duguay
2011	Heavenly	Mimi Leder

== Awards and nominations ==
Canadian Society of Cinematographers

Year	Category	Title	Episode	Result	Ref.
1985	Outstanding Documentary Cinematography	Various	—N/a	Won	
1986	Outstanding Documentary Cinematography	Various	—N/a	Won	
1987	Outstanding Documentary Cinematography	Various	—N/a	Won	
1994	Outstanding TV Drama Cinematography	The Commish	—N/a	Nominated	
1996	Outstanding Feature Cinematography	Impolite	—N/a	Won	
1997	Outstanding TV Drama Cinematography	Millennium	—N/a	Won	
1996	Outstanding TV Drama Cinematography	Millennium	—N/a	Won	
1999	Outstanding TV Drama Cinematography	Millennium	—N/a	Won	
2000	Outstanding TV Drama Cinematography	The Lone Gunmen	—N/a	Won	
2000	Outstanding TV Drama Cinematography	High Noon	—N/a	Nominated	
2000	Outstanding Feature Film Cinematography	Final Destination	—N/a	Nominated	
2004	Outstanding Feature Film Cinematography	Willard	—N/a	Won	
2015	TV series Cinematography	Game of Thrones	"Oathkeeper"	Nominated	
2015	TV series Cinematography	Ray Donovan	"The Captain"	Nominated	

American Society of Cinematographers

Year	Category	Title	Episode	Result	Ref.
1998	Outstanding Achievement in Cinematography in a Regular Series	Millennium	"The Thin White Line"	Nominated	
1999	Outstanding Achievement in Cinematography in a Regular Series	Millennium	"Skull and Bones"	Nominated	
2000	Outstanding Achievement in Cinematography in a Regular Series	Millennium	"Matryoshka"	Nominated	
2000	Outstanding Achievement in Cinematography in a Movie of the Week, Miniseries or Pilot (Basic or Pay)	High Noon	—N/a	Nominated	

Primetime Emmy Awards

Year	Category	Title	Episode	Result	Ref.
2013	Outstanding Cinematography for a Single-Camera Series	Game of Thrones	"Mhysa"	Nominated	
2015	Outstanding Cinematography for a Single-Camera Series	Game of Thrones	"The Dance of Dragons"	Nominated	

== Bibliography ==
- McLean, James; Henriksen, Lance; Spotnitz, Frank; Carter, Chris (2012). Chamberlain, Adam; Dixon, Brian A. (eds.). Back to Frank Black. Fourth Horseman Press. ISBN 978-0988392298.
