= Michael R. Perry =

American screenwriter

- Born: April 15, 1963 (age 63); Columbus, Ohio, U.S.
- Education: USC School of Cinematic Arts
- Occupations: Screenwriter, producer
- Years active: 1991–present

Michael R. Perry (born April 15, 1963) is an American television producer and screenwriter. His television credits include Eerie, Indiana, New York Undercover, American Gothic, The Practice, Millennium, Law & Order: Special Victims Unit (including the episode "Limitations" for which he won the Edgar Allan Poe Award for Best Episode in a TV Series), FreakyLinks, The Guardian, The Dead Zone, House M.D., Persons Unknown, Altered Carbon (TV series), Sweet Tooth, The River (a series he co-created) and NYPD Blue for which he won a Primetime Emmy Award for Outstanding Writing for a Drama Series.

As a screenwriter, he wrote the film The Voices and co-wrote the film Paranormal Activity 2.

== Filmography ==
Film writer

- Paranormal Activity 2 (2010)
- The Voices (2014)

Television

Year	Title	Writer	Producer	Notes
1991–1992	Eerie, Indiana	Yes	No	2 episodes
1995	New York Undercover	Yes	No	Episode "CAT"
1995–1996	American Gothic	Yes	No	7 episodes
1996–1997	NYPD Blue	Yes	No	Episode "Where's 'Swaldo"
1997–1998	The Practice	Yes	No	2 episodes
1997–1999	Millennium	Yes	Co-producer	Wrote 4 episodes
1999–2001	Law & Order: Special Victims Unit	Yes	Yes	Wrote 4 episodes
2000–2001	FreakyLinks	Yes	Supervising	Wrote 2 episodes
2001–2003	The Guardian	Yes	Co-executive	Wrote 11 episodes
2004–2005	The Dead Zone	Yes	Co-executive	Wrote 5 episodes
2005	House	Yes	No	Episode "Deception"
2010	Persons Unknown	Yes	Consulting	Wrote 3 episodes
2012	The River	Yes	No	Also creator
2015	Into the Badlands	Yes	Consulting	Wrote episode "Hand of Five Poisons"
2016	Wayward Pines	Yes	No	Episode "Blood Harvest"
2020	Altered Carbon	Yes	No	Episode "Nightmare Alley"
2021	Sweet Tooth	Yes	Co-executive	Wrote episode "Weird Deer S**t"
