= Emma Hollis =

Fictional character in Millennium

- Klea Scott as Emma Hollis
- First appearance: "The Innocents"
- Last appearance: "Goodbye to All That"
- Portrayed by: Klea Scott

In-universe information
- Gender: Female
- Occupation: FBI Special agent
- Family: James Hollis (father); Melissa Hollis (sister, deceased); Tamra Caffrey (half-sister)
- Affiliated with: Millennium Group

FBI Special Agent Emma Hollis is a fictional character from the American crime-thriller television series Millennium. Hollis, introduced in the series' third and final season, is a young special agent within the Federal Bureau of Investigation. During the show's final year, she was partnered with offender profiler Frank Black (Lance Henriksen). The character of Hollis was portrayed by Canadian actor Klea Scott.

Special agent Hollis made her first appearance in the third season's opening episode "The Innocents". She is the daughter of James Hollis, who suffered from alzheimer's disease. The character has been met with mixed reactions from critics; however, Scott's performance has been generally well received.

== Character arc ==
Hollis is a young Federal Bureau of Investigation special agent who becomes a protégée to offender profiler Frank Black (Lance Henriksen) when he begins working in Virginia. She struggles to understand the criminal mind, as her sister was murdered by a man with no motive. She has an estranged half-sister, Tamra, who has become a heroin addict. Hollis also has to deal with her father's bout with an Alzheimer's-like illness, which has possibly been induced by the Millennium Group—a secretive organisation to which Black had previously belonged, and which he now believes to be responsible for bioterrorism. Group member Peter Watts (Terry O'Quinn) uses Hollis' father's illness as leverage to coerce her into cooperating with the Millennium Group.

Hollis is very much aware of Black's reputation and eager to prove her worth as an investigator. Intrigued by Frank's abilities as an investigator, she strives to learn as much from him as she can, while Frank also learns to recognize her strengths as an FBI agent. The respected, independent, ambitious young Bureau Agent formed a close relationship with Frank Black—and then turned her back on him to join the Millennium Group, which had agreed to cure her father of Alzheimer's.

== Conceptual history ==
"It was unusual because it was intense just to be with Lance and myself, just one actor. And if that was a bad combination, that could have been a really miserable experience. But - I speak for myself I really liked working with Lance and respected him."

— Klea Scott on Hollis and Millennium.

When ending the second season, the producers and crew thought it would be the last. However, to their surprise Millennium was renewed for a third season. Many of the cliffhanger plot threads from the season finale were written off as the hallucinations of Frank Black. When creating the third season, they wanted to go back to the stand-alone storytelling format used in the first season; to do so they had Frank join the FBI and receive a new "skeptical" partner with whom he could work. Regarding Hollis, producer Michael Duggan said "she's not a rookie ... but she's young enough to be in awe of Frank Black's rep as a legendary crime solver".

Originally, the producers were looking for a white actress to play the part. Klea Scott's agent thought she was "really right" for the part. He then went down to the producers for the show and campaigned for her and guaranteed them if she did not fit for the role, he would never send another actor to the casting director of the show. Scott auditioned with four other actresses to get the part. Scott won the role, but producer Chip Johannessen recalled that "she wasn't what the network were looking, they wanted Heather Locklear or something to come. That was kind of how that went down". Fox backed down, and Scott got the role. Scott had been living in Los Angeles, but relocated to the series' filming location in Vancouver when she joined the cast. Scott had little input in her character's development, and admitted feeling "a little hurt" to find that Hollis had joined the Millennium Group by the end of the series; however, Scott felt this development was "believable and real". Scott's first day on set was during the filming of the final scene of "The Innocents", the third season's opening episode. The actress found it difficult to adjust to the series' heavy workload, but found it enjoyable to work with co-star Lance Henriksen.

== Reception ==
Although the character of Emma Hollis has been met with mixed reception, Scott's acting has generally been seen in a positive light. Entertainment Weekly writer Ken Tucker said Scott's presence as Hollis was "bracing", finding that she "captures perfectly the way young adepts try to soak up everything about their heroes"; while Raymond Edel of The Record described the character as a "quick-witted extrovert". Allan Johnson of the Chicago Tribune felt that the character made the third season of Millennium "a much more watchable series than in its previous two seasons", offering a "different perspective" on the series' dark subject matter. Rob Owen, of the Chicago Sun-Times, has noted that Hollis' involvement in the "a tug of war between Frank and [the] Millennium Group" gave Millennium's third season "a more personal take" on its central conflicts. Robert Shearman and Lars Pearson, in their book Wanting to Believe: A Critical Guide to The X-Files, Millennium & The Lone Gunmen, have been critical of the character of Emma Hollis, finding that she has been written in a manner that "pass[es] emotional baggage off as character development". However, Shearman and Pearson were less critical of Scott's performance, noting that the character was "played well" and that Scott "works hard to mine some sort of truth" out of Hollis' character. Randy Miller, writing for DVD Talk, noted that Hollis' introduction left Millennium feeling "more of a curious sister to The X-Files rather than its own entity", likening Hollis and Black to the latter series' Fox Mulder and Dana Scully.

== Footnotes ==
=== References ===
- Shearman, Robert; Pearson, Lars (2009). Wanting to Believe: A Critical Guide to The X-Files, Millennium & The Lone Gunmen. Mad Norwegian Press. ISBN 978-0975944691.
