= Thomas J. Wright =

American television director

- Born: United States
- Occupations: Film director, television director

Thomas J. Wright is an American television director, film director, artist, and set designer. Wright has directed episodes of Smallville, One Tree Hill, Firefly, and many other programs. He also worked extensively on Chris Carter's Millennium, on which he was a producer as well as directing 26 of the show's 67 episodes. He also directed the 1989 Hulk Hogan film No Holds Barred. He also was the artist who created the paintings used in the television horror anthology series Night Gallery.

== Selected filmography ==
- Castle (2013–2016)
- Tower Prep (2010)
- Wanted (2006)
- Supernatural (2005)
- One Tree Hill (2005)
- Bones (2005)
- NCIS (2003)
- Smallville (2002)
- CSI: Crime Scene Investigation (2000)
- Taken (2002)
- Firefly (2003)
- Millennium (1996)
- Space: Above and Beyond (1995)
- Nowhere Man (1995)
- The X-Files (1993)
- Hell Hath No Fury (1991)
- No Holds Barred (1989 film)
- Max Headroom (1987)
- The Twilight Zone (1986)
- Torchlight (1985)
