= Millennium (TV series) =

American television series

- Genre: Crime drama; Horror; Mystery; Thriller; Occult detective fiction
- Created by: Chris Carter
- Showrunners: Chris Carter; Glen Morgan; James Wong
- Starring: Lance Henriksen; Megan Gallagher; Klea Scott
- Composer: Mark Snow
- Countries of origin: United States, Canada
- Original language: English
- No. of seasons: 3
- No. of episodes: 67 (list of episodes)

Production
- Executive producers: Chris Carter; Michael Duggan; Chip Johannessen; Glen Morgan; James Wong
- Producers: Thomas J. Wright; Chip Johannessen
- Running time: 43–45 minutes
- Production companies: Ten Thirteen Productions; 20th Century Fox Television

Original release
- Network: Fox
- Release: October 25, 1996 – May 21, 1999

Related
- The X-Files; The Lone Gunmen

Millennium is an American television series created by Chris Carter, which aired on Fox from October 25, 1996 to May 21, 1999. The series follows the investigations of ex-FBI agent Frank Black (Lance Henriksen), now a consultant, with the ability to see inside the minds of criminals, working for a mysterious organization known as the Millennium Group.

The series was filmed in Vancouver, British Columbia, though most episodes were set in or around Seattle, Washington. The theme music was composed by Mark Snow, who also created the distinctive theme music for Carter's other series The X-Files. Although Millenium premiered with impressive ratings and good reviews, viewership declined throughout its three-season run, and it was canceled by Fox in early 1999. A seventh-season episode of The X-Files, titled "Millennium", aired in November 1999. This episode featured the Millennium Group and Frank Black to resolve plot threads from Millenium, and also made Millenium part of the X-Files franchise.

In 2018, Millennium was ranked #87 in Rotten Tomatoes's 100 Best Sci-Fi TV Shows of All Time. That same year, Millennium After the Millennium, a documentary based on the show, was released. It features interviews with Carter, Henriksen and other people who worked on the show.

== Series overview ==
Season	Episodes	Originally released	
Season	Episodes	First released	Last released
1	22	October 25, 1996	May 16, 1997
2	23	September 19, 1997	May 15, 1998
3	22	October 2, 1998	May 21, 1999
The X-Files – "Millennium"		November 28, 1999	

Millennium featured Frank Black, a freelance forensic profiler and former FBI agent with a unique ability to see the world through the eyes of serial killers and murderers, though he says that he is not psychic. Black worked for the mysterious Millennium Group, whose power and sinister agenda were explored throughout the series.

Black lives in Seattle with his wife Catherine and daughter Jordan. Jordan is revealed to have inherited some measure of her father's "gift", suggesting that Frank's abilities might be at least partly psychic, since Jordan's are clearly natural, not learned.

The first season deals primarily with Black pursuing various serial killers and other murderers, with only occasional references to the Group's true purpose. The second season introduces more supernatural occurrences into the show's mythology, with Frank often coming into conflict with forces that appear to be apocalyptic or demonic in nature. The final season shows Frank returning to Washington, D.C., to work with the FBI following the death of his wife at the hands of the Group. He is joined by a new partner, Emma Hollis. Despite Frank's warnings and what she herself observes, Emma ultimately joins the Group. Frank is last seen escaping from Washington, having taken Jordan from school.

After the show's cancellation, the crossover episode "Millennium" was made for the television series The X-Files, serving as a de facto series finale for Frank Black's story.

== Cast and characters ==
=== Main ===
- Lance Henriksen as FBI Special Agent Frank Black (also appeared in The X-Files season 7)
  Frank is an investigator with the unique ability to see through the eyes of a killer. Prior to the series premiere, Black leaves the FBI in order to join a group of private investigators known as the Millennium consortium. Following the death of his wife in season two, Black rejoins the FBI, departing Seattle with his daughter.
- Megan Gallagher as Catherine Black (seasons 1–2, guest season 3)
  Catherine was a clinical social worker who counseled crime victims and confronted challenging cases. Willing to sacrifice herself, she was infected with a deadly virus mysteriously associated with the Millennium Group. Catherine appears in "The Sound of Snow", as a figment of her husband's imagination. For this appearance, Gallagher was credited as a guest star.
- Klea Scott as FBI Special Agent Emma Hollis (season 3)
  Hollis is a young FBI special agent who becomes Frank's protégé in Virginia. She struggles to understand the criminal mind, and has to deal with her father's Alzheimer's-like disease. At the close of the series, she joins the Millennium group, much to the chagrin of Frank.

=== Recurring ===
- Terry O'Quinn as Peter Watts: A high-ranking member of the Millennium Group who often works with Frank on cases, though their friendship dissolves in season two and he takes on a more antagonistic role in season three.
- Brittany Tiplady as Jordan Black: Daughter of Frank and Catherine, she represents the light in the dark world where Frank works. There are suggestions throughout the series that Jordan has inherited Frank's particular gift, which troubles him greatly. Tiplady reprises her role as Jordan in the seventh-season episode of The X-Files, titled "Millennium".
- Bill Smitrovich as Lt. Robert Bletcher (season 1): A homicide detective for the Seattle police, and Frank's best friend.
- Stephen J. Lang as Det. Bob Giebelhouse: Seattle detective with a cynical view of humanity and a penchant for gallows humor.
- CCH Pounder as Cheryl Andrews: A forensic pathologist who works for the Millennium Group.
- Sarah-Jane Redmond as Lucy Butler: A woman introduced as the hybristophilic wife of a serial killer pursued by Frank, later revealed to be a demon capable of changing her own appearance.
- Kristen Cloke as Lara Means (season 2): A Millennium Group initiate like Frank, whose gift manifests itself as visions of angels. Much of her character arc involves being slowly drawn into the Group and its secrets.
- Allan Zinyk as Brian Roedecker (season 2): A computer wizard who was a sarcastic wisecracker created to serve as an occasional foil for the humorless Frank.
- Stephen E. Miller as Andy McClaren (season 3): An assistant director at the FBI and old friend and colleague of Frank's from his FBI days and was instrumental in teaming up Emma Hollis with the expert profiler who had returned to the area in mid-1998. He dismissed their suspicions concerning the Millennium Group as paranoia. Miller previously appeared in the pilot episode of the series as (possibly) another character.
- Peter Outerbridge as Barry Baldwin (season 3): An "aloof and arrogant" FBI agent who works with Frank and Emma on several cases.

== Production ==
=== Development ===
After Chris Carter's success with The X-Files, the Fox Broadcasting Company asked him if he would produce another series for them. He already had an idea for creating a show based around the coming millennium of the year 2000, and it was this idea that he followed up. The Fox executives gave Carter a budget of nearly $1.5 million per episode, and allowed him to create his own "look" for the show. Carter has said he was influenced by the Bible, Dostoyevsky and Mary Shelley in planning the series. Carter pitched Millennium to Fox as "Seven in Seattle." The setting of a dark, rain-soaked city and a world-weary detective's hunt for a religiously inspired serial killer have clear parallels with the pilot episode. One of the show's working titles was 2000, though Millennium was chosen.

For the second season, Glen Morgan and James Wong took on its management, while Carter focused on the fifth season of The X-Files and The X-Files motion picture. Morgan and Wong were consulting producers for the first season, but took over production, implementing several changes Fox wanted to try to boost ratings, which had declined during the first season. Morgan said that:

There was too much gore in the first season, and it was for shock's sake. There was no humor. Everybody wanted to know more about the Millennium Group. What was Frank's role with them? We needed to develop Frank. We had a good actress, Megan Gallagher, playing his wife, and what could we do with their relationship? Where can this go?

For season three, which aired in 1998, Carter took back control of the series; Morgan and Wong left to pursue their own careers. Carter, who had disapproved of the show's shift in tone, said he changed direction and tried to connect with the "roots" of the first season. The show's production team hoped to make "the stories a little more accessible", and moved the action from Seattle to Washington D.C.

=== Casting ===
Not convinced that Lance Henriksen was right for the main role, Fox execs considered William Hurt, until learning that he had no interest in acting for television. Chris Carter sent the screenplay for the "Pilot episode" to Henriksen, who thought it was "great". When his manager told him that it was a television script, he backed out for a while until he talked to Carter directly. Carter said about casting Henriksen:

I had tried to cast Lance Henriksen on The X-Files several times, he had always been either unavailable or uninterested. Anyway I remained a fan of his, I was in bed working in Vancouver and I realized he was working there too. So I found out where he was staying and wrote a personal note, had a fan slip it under his door, and said that I'd tried to get him on the show and hoped to work with him in the future. Little did he know when I was then writing Millennium I was writing with only him in mind, with no idea whether or not he'd actually do the project. So I wrote the project, approached him, he was very excited about it, we made a deal and the rest is now history.

Glen Morgan's and James Wong's changes reduced the emphasis on serial killers and explored government conspiracies and the machinations of the Millennium Group. In an interview with Fangoria, Wong stated that, "Our problem with the first season was that the shows felt the same, because the storytelling dealt with serial killers a lot. We wanted [the second] season to have the rotation X-Files does, where there are monster shows, there are conspiracy shows, there are weird science shows and then there are more personal shows. Not to copy X-Files, but for Millennium, we want to do the kind of thing where each week when you turn it on, you're not going to be sure what you're going to be watching." They tried to provide a "narrative drive" for Frank Black by breaking up his relationship with his wife. Morgan and Wong introduced new characters, such as Lara Means and computer hacker Brian Roedecker, who was introduced for comic effect; some fans were negative about the effects.

== Broadcast and release ==
=== Syndication and cancellation ===
Millennium's pilot episode was watched by 17.72 million viewers in the United States. The second season premiere, "The Beginning and the End", gathered a total viewership of 7.75 million in the United States. Fox decided to rebuild their primetime schedules in 1997 during the second season, airing Millennium at 9:00 pm EST on Fridays.

Fox renewed Millennium for a third season on May 20, 1998. During that season, the series faced problems with a declining viewership and pessimistic forecasts from industry insiders. Fox benched Millennium during its summer run, airing reruns of Mad TV in its time slot, without giving any official word on whether it would be renewed for a fourth season. Though Fox was willing to renew the show for a fourth season, the series was ultimately canceled due to Chris Carter having decided to focus his efforts on his new show Harsh Realm.

Frank Black returned in The X-Files season seven episode "Millennium", which featured the final onscreen appearances of both Frank Black and his daughter, Jordan.

The FX cable network picked up the off-network rights for Millennium after its cancellation for $20–$25 million dollars. NBC Universal's horror channel, Chiller, began airing Millennium weeknights at 7 pm Eastern (and again at 3 am Eastern the following morning) on Monday, February 4, 2008.

=== Home media ===
Millennium season one was released on DVD in the United States (Region 1) on July 20, 2004, season two on January 4, 2005, and season three on September 6, 2005. Millennium: The Complete Series was released on DVD on October 28, 2008. On October 4, 2006, the first, second, and third seasons were released in Region 4. The Complete Series was released on October 24, 2006, in Region 4. The show's complete soundtrack was released on iTunes in 2003.

=== Future ===
The release of Millennium on DVD prompted Lance Henriksen to propose a continuation of the series. Henriksen speculated that the sales numbers behind the boxed set might be the key to reviving Frank Black. "I wonder if the sales of these will tell us how many people loved the show and whether or not the movie ought to be made," Henriksen told the Sci-Fi Wire. "I mean, [Frank Black] still is alive. Maybe it's a good thing there was no closure for Millennium because now, if we did a movie, it would be good closure for me." Henriksen has gone on to support the Back to Frank Black campaign, a movement dedicated to the return of the character, explaining, "I really think it is a possibility."

Creator Chris Carter has joined Henriksen in expressing an interest in a film based on Millennium. While promoting The X-Files: I Want to Believe, Carter commented that he and Henriksen have "talked about that over the years" and that the cast and crew who would need to be involved are interested, adding, "I have ideas about how to do it." To date, 20th Century Fox has expressed no interest in such a project, even to the extent of publicly commenting on it.

Publishing house Fourth Horseman Press released Back to Frank Black (2012), a book offering in-depth insight into the production of the series. The book includes Chris Carter, Frank Spotnitz, Lance Henriksen, Brittany Tiplady and John Kenneth Muir among its contributors.

== Impact ==
=== Critical reception ===
Keith Uhlich from Slant Magazine was positive to both season one and three of Millennium, giving them both four out of five stars and saying of season one: "We are racing toward an apocalypse of our own creation. This is who we are." Mike Drucker from IGN called the second season a combination of the "X-Files and the violent paranoia of Se7en." Variety reviewer Jeremy Gerard compared the show to Twin Peaks and was overall positive to the series, but said "I just wish it were a little more fun, that I didn't have this nagging feeling that it wants to hurt me the next time I come around." Ken Tucker from Entertainment Weekly gave the show a B and said it had "great visuals and a commanding performance by Henriksen." Justine Elias from The New York Times was mostly positive to the series and said "If The X-Files, with its offbeat humor and conspiracy theories, wonders about those things that go bump in the night, Millennium explores the darkness – and embraces it." Daily Nebraskan said in their review that the show had "a lot of potential: a good lead actor, a solid premise and a feel that will keep audiences glued to their televisions."

=== Awards and nominations ===
Millennium was nominated for a variety of different awards including two Primetime Emmy Awards, four American Society of Cinematographers Awards, 1 Bram Stoker Awards, three Canadian Society of Cinematographers Awards (three wins), three Golden Globe Awards, one People's Choice Awards and five Young Artist Awards (one win). The most nominated episode is Matryoshka, Robert McLachlan became the most nominated crew member and Brittany Tiplady became the most nominated actor in the show's history. While Lance Henriksen became the only actor from the show to be nominated for a Golden Globe Award.

== Bibliography ==
- Chamberlain, Adam; Dixon, Brian (2012). Back to Frank Black. London, England: Fourth Horseman Press. ISBN 9780988392298.
- Shearman, Robert; Pearson, Lars (2009). Wanting to Believe: A Critical Guide to The X-Files, Millennium and The Lone Gunnmen. Mad Norwegian Press. ISBN 9780975944691.
- Genge, N.E. (1997). The Unofficial Millennium Companion. New York City: Random House. ISBN 9780712678339.
- Genge, N.E. (1997). The Unofficial Millennium Companion 2: The Covert Casebook of the Millennium Group. New York City: Random House. ISBN 9780712678698.

=== Novelizations ===
Novelizations of five episodes from the first season of Millennium were published by HarperCollins between 1997 and 1998.

1. The Frenchman (1997) by Elizabeth Hand
2. Gehenna (1997) by Lewis Gannett
3. Weeds (1998) by Victor Koman
4. Force Majeure (1998) by Lewis Gannett
5. The Wild and the Innocent (1998) by Elizabeth Massie

=== Comic books ===
In October 2014 it was announced that official series of comic books would be released by IDW Publishing.
