= Klea Scott =

Canadian actress (born 1968)

- Born: December 25, 1968 (age 57); Panama Canal Zone, Panama
- Education: University of North Carolina School of the Arts (BFA)
- Occupation: Actress
- Years active: 1982–present
- Spouse: John Langs (19??–2013)
- Children: 1

Klea Scott (born December 25, 1968) is a Canadian actress, known for her roles on television. She starred in the short-lived CBS police drama Brooklyn South (1997–98), and was later cast as Emma Hollis on the Fox television series Millennium for its third and final season. From 2005 to 2007, she starred in the CBC Television crime drama Intelligence.

== Biography ==
Klea Scott was born on December 25, 1968, in Panama City, Panama Canal Zone, and was raised in Canada.

Scott first appeared on the Canadian television show You Can't Do That on Television from 1982 to 1984. The experience encouraged her to switch her focus from dancing to acting. After graduating from high school, she moved to New York City to study acting. She spent a summer at the Williamstown Theater Festival in Massachusetts. Scott then went to college at North Carolina School of the Arts where she earned a Bachelor of Fine Arts degree. On stage, she has performed in All's Well That Ends Well and The Tempest with the New York Shakespeare Festival.

Scott made her network television debut on an episode of the CBS sitcom Cosby before accepting the regular role of Officer Nona Valentine on the CBS police drama Brooklyn South. After this short stint on network television, Scott found herself back doing community theatre, working with her husband, John Langs, a theatrical writer and director.

Scott auditioned for the Fox series Millennium in 1998. The show's producers cast her in the role of FBI Agent Emma Hollis in the third and final season. The series was cancelled in 1999.

She went on to guest star in television shows including ER and Just Shoot Me! and was later cast as Detective Sonia Robbins in the CBS drama series Robbery Homicide Division.

In film, Scott has been seen in supporting roles in movies such as Minority Report and Collateral.

Scott co-starred with Ian Tracey in Intelligence, an award-winning series from Da Vinci's Inquest creator Chris Haddock, which premiered in October 2006 on CBC. A second season aired from October 2007, concluding in December that same year.

In 2017, Scott guest starred in an episode of Grey's Anatomy playing Dominique Eldredge.

Scott appeared in her role as Jillian Howe in Pretty Little Liars.

In 2019, she began playing the role of Dana Booker in the Pretty Little Liars spinoff series Pretty Little Liars: The Perfectionists.

== Personal life ==
Scott has one son, named Captain, born in January 2010.

== Filmography ==
Year	Title	Role	Notes
1982–1984	You Can't Do That on Television	Klea Scott	8 episodes
1984	UFO Kidnapped	Klea	
1989	A Whisper to a Scream	Sasha	
1997	Brooklyn South	Off. Nona Valentine	22 episodes
1998–1999	Millennium	Agent Emma Hollis	22 episodes
2000	Just Shoot Me!	Wanda	Episode: "Blinded by the Right"
2002–2003	Robbery Homicide Division	Det. Sonia Robbins	13 episodes
2002	Minority Report	Pre-Crime Cop	
2002	Lullaby	Zoe	
2003	Manfast	Alex	
2004	Collateral	Fed #1	
2005–2007	Intelligence	Mary Spalding	26 episodes
2016–2017	Pretty Little Liars	Jillian Howe	3 episodes
2019	Pretty Little Liars: The Perfectionists	Dana Booker	9 episodes
2020	Break Even	Mrs. Mortem	
2025	Vicious	Neighbor Woman	
