= Chris Carter (screenwriter) =

American television and film producer (born 1956)

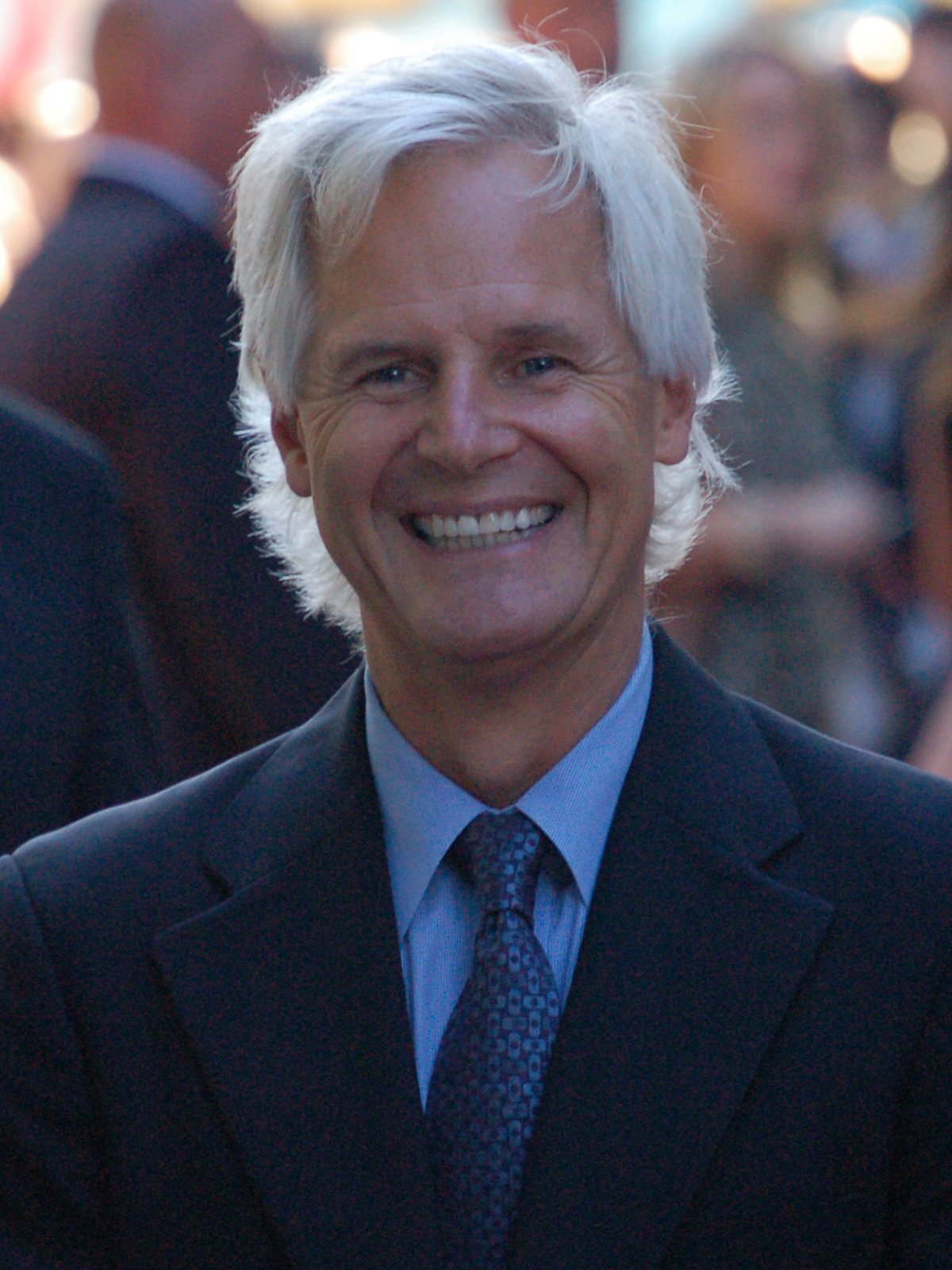
- Carter at the July 2008 London premiere of The X-Files: I Want to Believe
- Born: Christopher Carl Carter; October 13, 1956 (age 70); Bellflower, California, U.S.
- Education: California State University, Long Beach
- Occupations: Writer, director, producer
- Years active: 1986–present
- Employer: Ten Thirteen Productions
- Known for: Creator of The X-Files
- Spouse: Dori Pierson (m. 1987)

Christopher Carl Carter (born October 13, 1956) is an American television and film producer, director and writer. Born in Bellflower, California, Carter graduated with a degree in journalism from California State University, Long Beach, before spending thirteen years working for Surfing Magazine. After beginning his television career working on television films for Walt Disney Studios, Carter rose to fame in the 1990s for creating the Fox science fiction supernatural drama series The X-Files. The show earned high viewership ratings, and eventually led to Carter's being able to negotiate the creation of future series.

Carter has his own television production company, Ten Thirteen Productions, wherein he went on to create three more series for the network—Millennium, a doomsday-themed series which met with critical approval and low viewer numbers; Harsh Realm, which was canceled after three episodes had aired; and The Lone Gunmen, a spin-off of The X-Files which lasted for a single season. Carter's film roles include writing both of The X-Files' cinematic spin-offs—1998's successful The X-Files and the poorly received 2008 follow-up The X-Files: I Want to Believe, the latter of which he also directed—while his television credits have earned him several accolades including eight Primetime Emmy Award nominations.

== Early life ==
Chris Carter was born on October 13, 1956, in Bellflower, California. His father worked in the construction industry. Carter has described his childhood as "fairly normal". He was fond of both Little League Baseball and surfing; his surfing stance is goofy footed. He attended California State University, Long Beach, in Long Beach, graduated with a journalism degree in 1979. An avid surfer, he began writing for Surfing Magazine, a San Clemente-based journal, eventually becoming its editor at the age of 28. Carter would work for the magazine for thirteen years, and credits his tenure there for teaching him how to run a business. It was also at this time that Carter began taking an interest in pottery, making "hundreds of thousands of pieces" of dinnerware as a hobby. He has compared the process of making pottery to Zen meditations, although he has since thrown out most of his work.

== Personal life ==
In 1983, Carter began dating Dori Pierson, whom he had met through a cousin of hers who worked with him at Surfing Magazine. The couple were married in 1987, and live in Santa Barbara.

== Career ==
=== Starting in television ===
Pierson's connections at Walt Disney Studios led to chairman Jeffrey Katzenberg hiring Carter on a standard contract. Carter began writing television films for the studio, penning The B.R.A.T. Patrol in 1986 and Meet the Munceys in 1988. These scripts led to Carter being associated with contemporary youth comedy at the studio, and although he enjoyed the work he felt that his real strengths and interests lay in serious drama instead.

Carter met the then-president of NBC, Brandon Tartikoff, at a company softball game in Brentwood, California. Tartikoff and Carter began talking between innings, and when Tartikoff eventually read some of Carter's script work, he brought him over to write for the network. There, Carter developed a number of unproduced television pilots—Cameo by Night, featuring Sela Ward; Brand New Life, which has been described as being similar to The Brady Bunch; Copter Cop, a science fiction series that was hampered by Tartikoff's injuries after a car accident; and Cool Culture, influenced by Carter's passion for surfing and experience with Surfing Magazine. During this time Carter would also work as a producer on Rags to Riches, a job he accepted in order to learn more about producing a series.

Peter Roth, at that time the president of Stephen J. Cannell Productions, obtained a copy of Carter's pilot script for Cool Culture, and although the series was never picked up, Roth was interested in hiring Carter to work on the CBS series Palace Guard. However, Roth would soon leave Cannell Productions to work for Fox as the head of its television production wing. Carter was among the first wave of new staff hired by Roth in 1992 to develop material for the network, and he began work on a series based on his own childhood fondness for The Twilight Zone, Night Gallery and Kolchak: The Night Stalker.

=== The X-Files and success ===
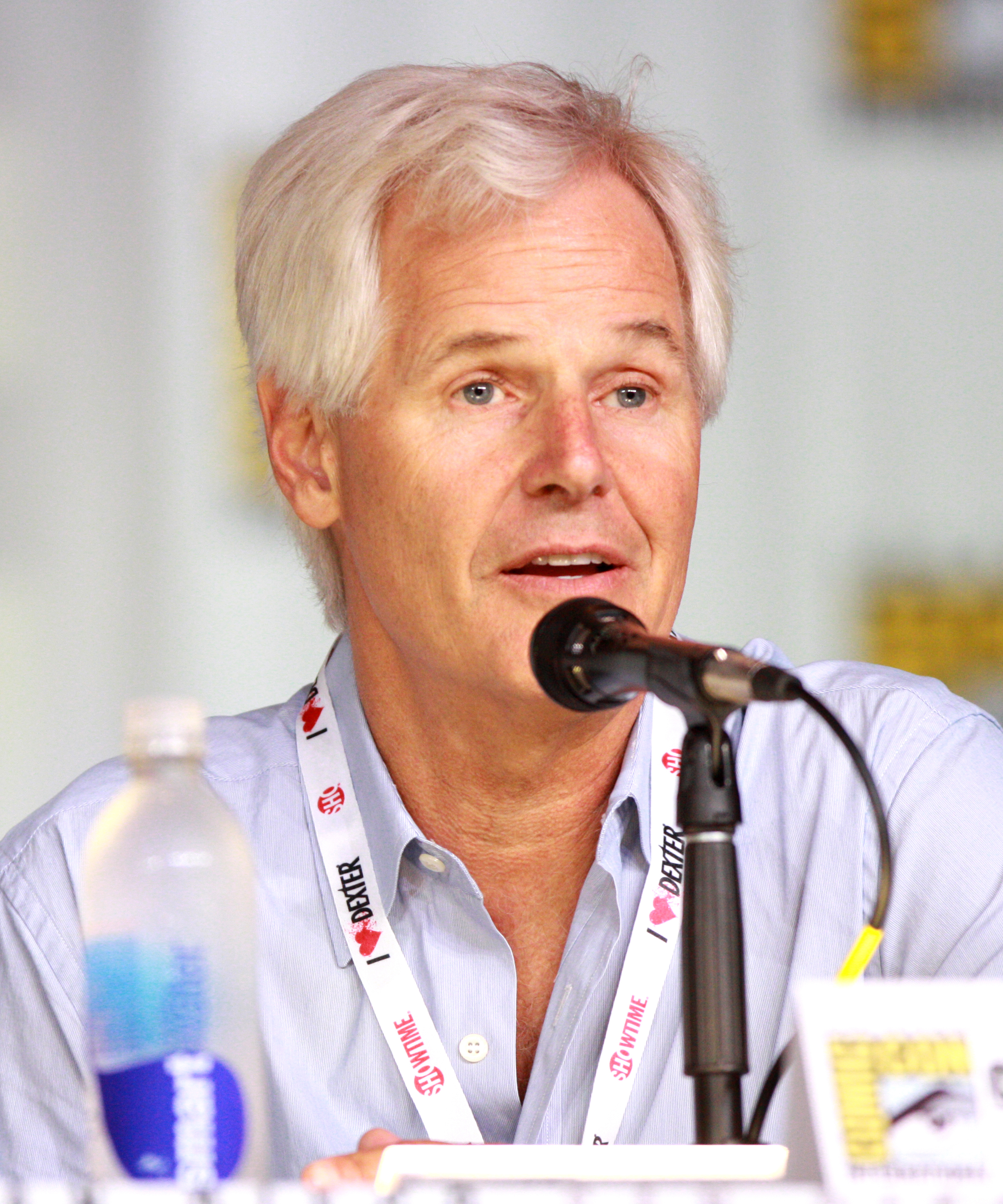
Carter in July 2013

Carter's new series would take its stylistic inspiration from Kolchak, while thematically reflecting his experiences growing up during the Watergate scandal. Carter also drew inspiration from his friend John E. Mack's survey of American beliefs in ufology, which indicated that three percent of the population believed they had been abducted by aliens. Roth warmed to the idea upon hearing of the influence of Kolchak, believing that vampires—one of the central antagonists of the original series—would be popular with audiences given the interest being shown in the upcoming film Interview with the Vampire, although Carter insisted on an extraterrestrial-focused series. However, Carter had never been interested in science fiction before this point, professing to have briefly read one novel each by Ursula K. Le Guin and Robert A. Heinlein. Basing his characters instead on those found in the English television series The Avengers, Carter took an eighteen-page treatment for his new project—by now titled The X-Files—to a pitch meeting at Fox, where it was soon rejected. With the help of Roth, Carter was able to arrange a second pitch meeting, at which the network reluctantly agreed to greenlight a pilot for the series.

After finding the series' two starring leads in Gillian Anderson and David Duchovny, Carter was given a budget of $2 million to produce a pilot episode. The series aired on Friday nights on the Fox network, being broadcast in tandem with The Adventures of Brisco County, Jr. in what was perceived to be an unpopular timeslot. The series earned relatively impressive Nielsen ratings for its Friday timeslot, and was given a full twenty-four episode order. The series' popularity and critical acclaim built over the course of its second and third seasons, and saw it earning its first Golden Globe Award for Best Television Series – Drama and breaking the record for highest price paid by a network for rights to air re-runs, fetching $600,000 per episode from Fox's sister network FX. After Carter's initial three-year signing for Fox had ended, the success of the series allowed him to negotiate a five-year contract with several additional perks, including the guarantee of a feature film adaptation to be produced by the parent company's film studio, and the greenlighting of Carter's next television project. In March 2015, it was confirmed that Carter was set to executive produce and write for the revival of The X-Files, which was set for a six-episode event series. In 2017 it was announced that The X-Files would return to Fox with a ten-episode season 11, with Carter set to executive produce and write. Both Gillian Anderson and David Duchovny returned, as well as veteran writers Glen Morgan, Darin Morgan, and Jim Wong, and newcomers Gabe Rotter, Benjamin Van Allen, and Brad Follmer. The eleventh season has received generally positive if somewhat lukewarm reviews from critics, but ratings fell dramatically, and Gillian Anderson has stated she will not play Scully again.

In August 2020, Fox announced that an animated comedy spin-off series was in development.

In October 2020, Chris Carter said: "I always thought there would be even more X-Files." He admitted that continuing the series at this point with Duchovny and Anderson is unlikely, but has plans to continue the franchise with an upcoming animated spinoff. "Being that Gillian has decided to move on with her career, we certainly couldn't do Mulder and Scully again. But that's not to say there isn't another way to do The X-Files. And so right now I think the future is unwritten." The rights are now owned by Disney.

=== Millennium ===
Carter began work on a new series, Millennium. The genesis of this new project stemmed from "Irresistible", a second-season episode of The X-Files which Carter had written, which focused on a sexually motivated serial killer with none of that series' usual supernatural trappings. Carter fleshed out the basis of the new show's protagonist, Frank Black, and travelled to Seattle for inspiration for a new setting. Influence was also drawn from the works of Nostradamus, and the increasing popular interest in eschatology ahead of the coming millennium. The central role of Black was eventually filled by Lance Henriksen, and the series began airing in the Friday timeslot formerly occupied by The X-Files. "Pilot", the début episode, was heavily promoted by Fox, and brought in over a quarter of the total audience during its broadcast.

The series also attracted a high degree of critical appraisal, earning a People's Choice Award for "Favorite New TV Dramatic Series" in its first year. At the beginning of the second season, Carter handed over control of the series to Glen Morgan and James Wong, with whom he had previously worked on both Millennium's first season and several seasons of The X-Files. Despite its promising start, however, ratings for Millennium after the pilot remained consistently low, and it was cancelled after three seasons.

=== Feature films ===
During the production of the fourth season of The X-Files, work on the first feature film adaptation of the series began. Also titled The X-Files, Carter initially began a treatment for the script over Christmas holidays in Hawaii in 1996. Series producer Frank Spotnitz collaborated on the story outline at this time. Carter would later return to Hawaii for a ten-day stint in 1997 to begin fleshing out the finished script. Carter appointed frequent series director Rob Bowman as director of the film, which went on to feature many of the series' regular cast, including Duchovny, Anderson, Mitch Pileggi and William B. Davis.

The X-Files premiered on June 19, 1998, eventually making a worldwide gross of $189 million, and received mixed reviews.

Ten years after the success of the first film, and six years after The X-Files final season had finished, Carter would both write and direct a second feature film, titled The X-Files: I Want to Believe. Filmed in British Columbia, I Want to Believe was released on July 25, 2008; eventually grossing $68,369,434 worldwide. The film received generally negative reviews from critics.

In 2026, he released Queens for a Day, whose screenplay was written by his wife, Dori Carter.

=== Other work ===
Carter has had several brief cameo roles as an actor, first appearing in The X-Files' "Anasazi" as an FBI agent; before portraying a member of a film audience in "Hollywood A.D.", a later episode of the same series. Carter also made a brief appearance in "Three Men and a Smoking Diaper", an episode of The Lone Gunmen.

In 1999, Carter began adapting the comic book series Harsh Realm as a television show. Carter's friend and frequent collaborator Daniel Sackheim had optioned the comics for adaptation in 1996. However, when the series first aired on October 8, 1999, the comics' writers Andrew Paquette and James Hudnall were given no writing credits for the work; the two then filed suit against Fox to be credited for their work. Harsh Realm received disappointing viewing figures, and was cancelled after only three episodes had been broadcast.

Two years later, Carter launched a spin-off of The X-Files titled The Lone Gunmen, a series centred on three minor characters from the former series. The Lone Gunmen was cancelled after thirteen episodes, later receiving a coda in the form of a crossover episode with The X-Files. Carter has since been involved with writing and directing the as-yet unreleased film Fencewalker, set to feature Natalie Dormer and Katie Cassidy. In 2011, he began working to develop Unique, a police thriller television series; the project was eventually dropped before completion.

Carter next began work on the Amazon Studios television series The After. The pilot episode was made available for viewing on February 6, 2014; the series was green-lit the following month, but finally cancelled on January 5, 2015, without another episode beyond the pilot being shot.

=== Influences ===
As well as The Twilight Zone and Kolchak: The Night Stalker, Carter has spoken about the influence on his work of Frankenstein (both the Whale film and the Mary Shelley novel), The Wizard of Oz (1939), Spielberg films (specifically citing E.T., Schindler's List and Munich), and Twin Peaks, about which he has said, "I could have watched that show every night of the week, that's how much I loved it."

In addition to these cultural sources, Carter has spoken about the impact that witnessing the hypnosis, by John Mack, of an alleged abductee, and meeting alleged abductees and UFO witnesses in general, had upon his work writing The X-Files: "When I was writing about the phenomenon, it wasn’t as a disbeliever – it was as a person who wanted to believe."

== Accolades ==
Carter's work has earned him several accolades over his career, including eight nominations at the Primetime Emmy Awards. Carter has also received award nominations for the Directors Guild of America Awards, the Edgar Awards, and the British Academy Television Awards.

Award	Year	Category	Work	Result	Ref.
Emmy Awards	1995	Outstanding Writing for a Drama Series	"Duane Barry"	Nominated	
Emmy Awards	1995	Outstanding Drama Series	The X-Files	Nominated	
Emmy Awards	1996	Outstanding Drama Series	The X-Files	Nominated	
Emmy Awards	1997	Outstanding Writing for a Drama Series	"Memento Mori"	Nominated	
Emmy Awards	1997	Outstanding Drama Series	The X-Files	Nominated	
Emmy Awards	1998	Outstanding Writing for a Drama Series	"The Post-Modern Prometheus"	Nominated	
Emmy Awards	1998	Outstanding Directing for a Drama Series	"The Post-Modern Prometheus"	Nominated	
Emmy Awards	1998	Outstanding Drama Series	The X-Files	Nominated	
Directors Guild of America Awards	1995	Outstanding Directing for a Drama Series	"The List"	Nominated	
Directors Guild of America Awards	1998	Outstanding Directing for a Drama Series	"The Post-Modern Prometheus"	Nominated	
Directors Guild of America Awards	1999	Outstanding Directing for a Drama Series	"Triangle"	Nominated	
British Academy Television Awards	1999	Best International Programme or Series	The X-Files	Nominated	
Edgar Awards	1995	Best International Programme or Series	"The Erlenmeyer Flask"	Nominated	

== Filmography ==
Film

Year	Title	Director	Writer	Producer
1986	The B.R.A.T. Patrol	No	Yes	No
1988	Meet the Munceys	No	Yes	No
1998	The X-Files	No	Yes	Yes
2008	The X-Files: I Want to Believe	Yes	Yes	Yes
2026	Queens for a Day	Yes	No	Yes

Television

Year	Title	Director	Writer	Executive Producer	Creator	Notes
1987–1988	Rags to Riches	No	Yes	Yes	No	Wrote 2 episodes; Also co-producer
1989–1990	Brand New Life	No	Yes	Yes	Yes	
1991	Midnight Caller	No	Yes	No	No	Wrote episode "A Cry in the Night"
1993–2002; 2016–2018	The X-Files	Yes	Yes	Yes	Yes	Wrote 72 episodes, directed 10 episodes
1996–1999	Millennium	No	Yes	Yes	Yes	Wrote 7 episodes
1999–2000	Harsh Realm	No	Yes	Yes	Yes	Wrote 4 episodes
2001	The Lone Gunmen	No	Yes	Yes	Yes	Wrote 2 episodes
2014	The After	Yes	Yes	Yes	Yes	Pilot
TBA	The X-Files	No	No	Yes	No	Post-production

== Footnotes ==
=== References ===
- Chris Carter, Ken Horton, Frank Spotnitz, Lance Henriksen, Megan Gallagher, David Nutter, Mark Snow, John Peter Kousakis, Mark Freeborn, Robert McLachlan, Chip Johannessen and Thomas J. Wright (2004). Order in Chaos: Making Millennium Season One (DVD). Millennium: The Complete First Season: Fox Home Entertainment.
- Duncan, Jody (1998). The Making of The X-Files Movie. HarperPrism. ISBN 0-06-107316-4.
- Edwards, Ted (1996). X-Files Confidential. Little, Brown and Company. ISBN 0-316-21808-1.
- Fraga, Erica (2010). LAX-Files: Behind the Scenes with the Los Angeles Cast and Crew. CreateSpace. ISBN 9781451503418.
- Genge, N. E. (1997). Millennium: The Unofficial Companion. Century. ISBN 0-7126-7833-6.
- Lovece, Frank (1996). The X-Files Declassified. Citadel Press. ISBN 0-8065-1745-X.
- Lowry, Brian (1995). The Truth is Out There: The Official Guide to the X-Files. Harper Prism. ISBN 0-06-105330-9.
- Shapiro, Marc (2000). All Things: The Official Guide to the X-Files Volume 6. Harper Prism. ISBN 0-06-107611-2.
