= The X-Files Mythology, Volume 1 – Abduction =

- Season 1
- Region 1 DVD cover
- No. of episodes: 15

Season chronology
- ← Previous; The X-Files Mythology, Volume 1 – Abduction Next → Volume 2 – Black Oil

Volume 1 of The X-Files Mythology collection is a DVD release containing selected episodes from the first to the third seasons of the American science fiction television series The X-Files. The episodes collected in the release form the beginning of the series' mythology, and are centred on alien abduction at the hands of "colonists". Several of the elements introduced in the collected episodes arose through necessity during production, as working around the pregnancy of lead actress Gillian Anderson led to both the creation of unifying plot thread and the introduction of several recurring characters.

The episodes in the collection follow the investigations of paranormal-related cases, or X-Files, by FBI Special Agents Fox Mulder (David Duchovny) and Dana Scully (Anderson). Mulder is a believer in the paranormal, while the skeptical Scully has been assigned to debunk his work. Events covered in the episodes include the meeting of Mulder and Scully, the introduction and assassination of a secretive informant, the apparent return of Mulder's lost sister, and the abduction and return of Scully.

The collection contains the first episodes in the series' mythology, or fictional story arcs. When the series began, Chris Carter did not think of creating a "mythology" for the episodes focusing on extraterrestrial life, because he felt that "they were just stories we wanted to tell". Eventually, however, the writers saw that the most "personal" episodes were those based on the government conspiracy, and, as such, developed more stories based around the conceit. Jerry Hardin, William B. Davis, Mitch Pileggi, Tom Braidwood, Dean Haglund and Bruce Harwood all play supporting roles in the collection. Released on June 7, 2005, the collection received generally positive reviews from critics.

== Plot summary ==
FBI Special Agent Fox Mulder (David Duchovny) has made a name for himself working on X-Files—unexplained cases which may be paranormal in origin. He is appointed a partner in these investigations—Dana Scully (Gillian Anderson)—with his superiors hoping that she will be able to debunk and discredit his work. Their first case together is the investigation of possible abductions in Oregon, which falters when their evidence is destroyed in a fire. A later case, involving the disappearance of a United States Air Force test pilot, sees the introduction of secretive informant Deep Throat (Jerry Hardin), who continues to provide the agents sensitive information. This help is supplemented by conspiracy theorist group The Lone Gunmen, who are contacted for help in a further abduction case. Deep Throat is soon killed, however, when he helps the agents uncover details of a government human cloning program, and the X-Files unit is closed shortly thereafter.

Unable to continue his work with Scully, Mulder obtains information about possible extraterrestrial contact in Puerto Rico, finding that the SETI program at the Arecibo Observatory is being forcibly closed. Although the pair are later allowed to resume their work, Scully is later kidnapped by an unhinged multiple alien abductee, Duane Barry. Barry takes Scully to a hilltop where she is then abducted, presumably by aliens. She is found comatose at a later date, having mysteriously arrived at a hospital, and recovers several days later.

Mulder receives a call from his father, finding out that his sister Samantha (Megan Leitch), who had been abducted as a child, has returned. Samantha is being pursued by a shapeshifting bounty hunter, who is assassinating human clones. Samantha is killed, although it is revealed that she was simply one of a number of clones, produced using alien tissue to create an alien-human hybrid.

The Lone Gunmen contact Mulder and Scully about a successful attempt by a friend of theirs to hack the United States Department of Defense computer system. The hacker, Kenneth Soona (Bernie Coulson), is able to give Mulder the downloaded information on a digital cassette. However, Soona is later assassinated, and the downloaded files are found to be written in Navajo. Contacting Albert Hosteen (Floyd Red Crow Westerman)—a Navajo man capable of translating the files—Mulder is shown a box-car full of what appear to be alien corpses. He is trapped in the box-car by the series' antagonist, The Smoking Man (William B. Davis), and left for dead after it is destroyed. He is later found and nursed back to health by Hosteen. Meanwhile, Scully investigates the possible involvement of the smallpox eradication program in human genetic experimentation, discovering that a Nazi scientist who defected during Operation Paperclip has been conducting human experimentation to create alien-human hybrids. Her sister Melissa (Melinda McGraw), however, is shot by assassins who mistake her for Dana, and dies in hospital that night.

== Background ==
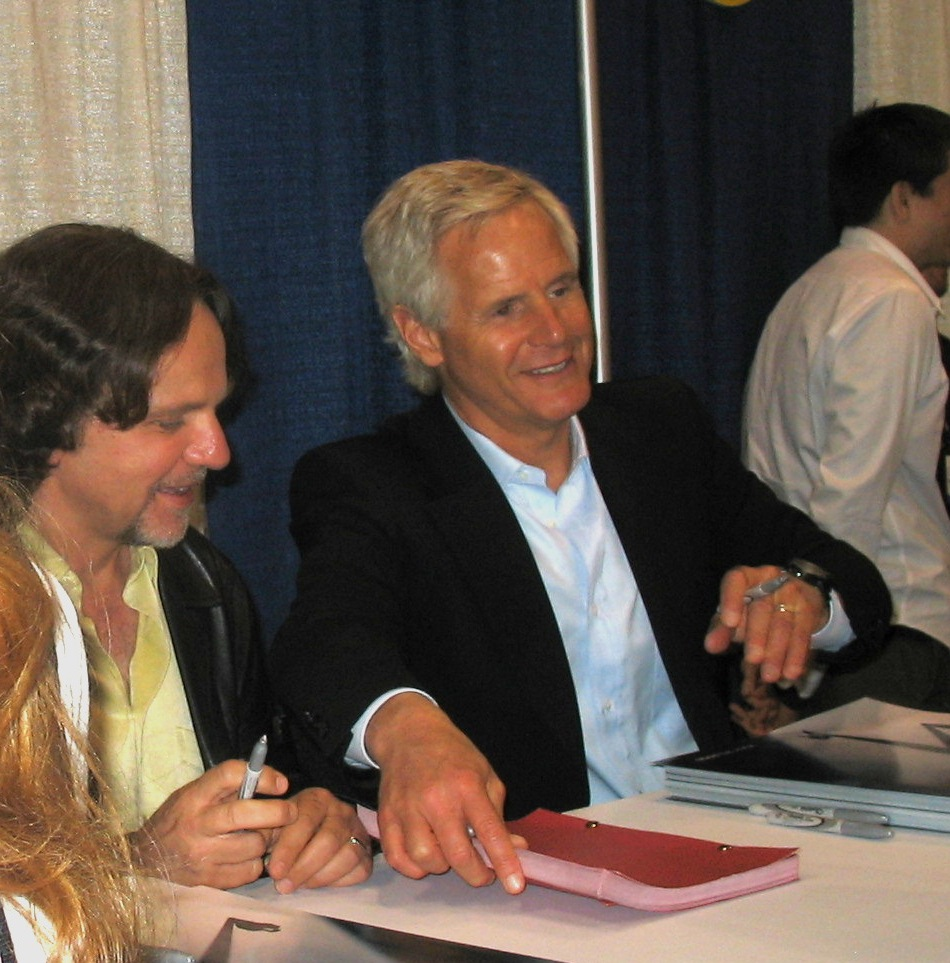
Spotnitz (left) and Carter (right), the main writers for the show's mythology episodes.

When the series began, Chris Carter did not think of creating a "mythology" for the episodes focusing on extraterrestrial life, because he felt that "they were just stories we wanted to tell". Eventually, however, the writers saw that the most "personal" episodes were those based on the government conspiracy. Another reason for the development of an ongoing mythology was that the producers were afraid of not creating a thread between the episodes centering on the conspiracy, feeling that it would be pretentious not to do so.

According to Carter, the mythology "sprung from" the series' pilot and its follow up, "Deep Throat", which set up the idea that aliens had been on Earth for many years. Carter sees the final scene of "Deep Throat" as the "launching moment for the entire mythology". The main theme for the series, stemming from these episodes, is Fox Mulder's quest to find "the truth" about his sister, Samantha Mulder, who had been abducted as a child. This quest drove the character to investigate the paranormal, setting the framework for the series.

After several stand-alone episodes featuring UFOs and extraterrestrials early in the first season, the show's mythology developed largely based on the pregnancy of actress Gillian Anderson, who became pregnant midway through production of the first season. Executive producer Frank Spotnitz described it as "the best thing that ever happened to the series", noting that the mythology "really ended up running through the life of the series, all because Gillian Anderson became pregnant". Although there were initially thoughts about Anderson's character Scully giving birth to an alien child, ultimately the writers decided to work around Anderson's pregnancy. The writers decided on closing the X-Files at the end of the season to separate Mulder and Scully from one another, and have Scully abducted, reappearing comatose several episodes later. In addition to the creation of the storyline concerning Scully's abduction, Anderson's reduced role in the first half of the second season permitted the writers to develop some of the other characters in the show including Assistant Director Walter Skinner (Mitch Pileggi), The Smoking Man (William B. Davis) and X (Steven Williams), and resulted in the introduction of the character Alex Krycek (Nicholas Lea). Krycek, who was initially created by writer Howard Gordon to temporarily replace Scully as Mulder's partner for three episodes eventually grew into a character that lasted seven seasons on the show.

Prior to the second season episode "One Breath", The Smoking Man mostly "lurked around in the shadows", providing a "forbidding" presence. The Smoking Man uttered only four audible words in the entire first season of the show, all of them being in "Tooms". Producer and director R.W. Goodwin did not have faith in William B. Davis' ability to take on the role of the series' chief antagonist. It was later revealed to the producers that Davis was running an acting school, and teaching such actors as ninth season guest star Lucy Lawless.

In the two-part story of "Colony" and "End Game", Carter and Spotnitz, along with Duchovny, created what would become a recurring character in the alien bounty hunter. According to Carter, Duchovny came to him and said "it be great if we had like an alien bounty hunter", an idea of which Carter approved. Spotnitz has noted that the actor cast for the role, Brian Thompson, was chosen because he had a very "distinctive look" about him, most notably his face and mouth.

== Reception ==
Released on June 7, 2005, the collection has received generally positive reviews from critics. Slant Magazine's Keith Uhlich rated it three stars out of five, praising the quality of the episodes included in the set, but ultimately finding that they were best viewed in the context of the "standalone" episodes which were omitted—singling out "Conduit" and "The Jersey Devil" as episodes which would aid the series' "dual character study". Writing for IGN, Dan Iverson rated the collection eight out of ten, finding that the mythology-based episodes formed the basis of the relationship between the characters of Mulder and Scully. Making reference to the first-season episode "Squeeze", not included in the collection, he added that "even though people watched the series to see little green men and liver-eating elastic monsters, it was the relationship between the two which made the series a total success". However, he found that the set's extra features material was sparse, describing it as being just enough "to keep us from complaining". Writing for DVD Talk, Jeffrey Robinson was impressed with the collection, finding that the featured episodes worked well together without losing cohesion, and stating that "whether you are a casual viewer or a fan who already owns the season sets, owning The X-Files Mythology, Volume 1: Abduction is a must". Exclaim!'s Monica S. Kuebler felt negatively about the collection, noting that anyone who would be interested in it would be likely to already own the collected episodes through other releases, and asking "should you buy Abduction? It all depends on how much five commentaries and a doc are worth to you, because chances are, if you love the X-Files ... you've probably already bought the episodes included here at least once".

== Episodes ==
No. in set	No. in series	Title	Directed by	Written by	Original release date	Prod. code
1	1	"Pilot"	Robert Mandel	Chris Carter	September 10, 1993	1X79
Agent Dana Scully (Gillian Anderson) is assigned to work with Agent Fox Mulder (David Duchovny) on the X-Files in an attempt to debunk his work on the paranormal. Their first case has them investigating apparent alien abductions. A near comatose man, Billy Miles (Zachary Ansley), is taking his classmates, including Theresa Nemman (Sarah Koskoff), into the woods, where they are killed in a flash of bright light. Also guest stars Cliff DeYoung, Leon Russom, and Alexandra Stewart.
2	2	"Deep Throat"	Daniel Sackheim	Chris Carter	September 17, 1993	1X02
Mulder and Scully travel to Idaho in order to investigate the disappearance of a military test pilot. They observe unusual aircraft activity, prompting Mulder to proclaim the existence of a government conspiracy. Mulder sneaks onto the military base and is spotlighted by one of the craft, but is captured by soldiers and has his memory erased before he is released. Guest stars Jerry Hardin, Andrew Johnston, Gabrielle Rose, Michael Bryan French, Seth Green, Lalainia Lindbjerg, and John Cuthbert.
3	10	"Fallen Angel"	Larry Shaw	Howard Gordon & Alex Gansa	November 19, 1993	1X10
Mulder puts the future of the X-Files in jeopardy when he heads to a UFO crash site being rapidly covered up by the military. He is arrested and while in jail he meets Max Fenig (Scott Bellis), a UFO fanatic whose NICAP group has followed Mulder's work on the X-Files. When Mulder is released, Scully urges him to return to Washington to face his superiors and try to save his job, but Mulder finds out that Fenig is more than meets the eye and ignores Scully to try to save him instead. Guest-starring Marshall Bell and Frederick Coffin.
4	17	"E.B.E."	William Graham	Glen Morgan & James Wong	February 18, 1994	1X17
Mulder and Scully receive information from Deep Throat about a UFO that was shot down over Iraq and has been secretly transported to the US. However, Deep Throat then intentionally misleads the agents to prevent them from discovering the truth. Guest starring Bruce Harwood, Dean Haglund and Tom Braidwood.
5	24	"The Erlenmeyer Flask"	R. W. Goodwin	Chris Carter	May 13, 1994	1X24
A seemingly unrelated car chase leads Mulder and Scully to a scientific lab encompassing a secret which could provide proof of a government conspiracy. Guest starring Jerry Hardin and William B. Davis.
6	25	"Little Green Men"	David Nutter	Glen Morgan & James Wong	September 16, 1994	2X01
With the X-Files shut down, FBI agent Fox Mulder finds his own belief in the truth waning. When an old political ally (Raymond J. Barry) gives him a new reason to believe, he goes alone to an abandoned SETI program site—Arecibo Observatory—in Arecibo, Puerto Rico. Concerned for his safety, fellow FBI agent Dana Scully (Gillian Anderson) has to track down his whereabouts before someone or something else does.
7	29	"Duane Barry"	Chris Carter	Chris Carter	October 14, 1994	2X05
An ex-FBI agent (Steve Railsback) escapes from a mental hospital and holds several people hostage in a travel agency. Mulder and Alex Krycek (Nicholas Lea) are sent in to help with the negotiations since the man claims to have been a UFO abductee.
8	30	"Ascension"	Michael Lange	Paul Brown	October 21, 1994	2X06
Continuing from the previous episode, Mulder races to Scully's house after listening to the recording of her attack on his answering machine. Duane Barry (Steve Railsback) has kidnapped Scully, determined to offer her to the aliens in his place.
9	32	"One Breath"	R. W. Goodwin	Glen Morgan & James Wong	November 11, 1994	2X08
When Scully mysteriously re-appears comatose in a hospital, Mulder drives himself crazy trying to find the people responsible, tracking down and threatening The Smoking Man, and finding himself at odds with his seeming ally X.
10	34	"Red Museum"	Win Phelps	Chris Carter	December 9, 1994	2X10
Several Wisconsin teens are found wandering in the woods in their underwear with "He Is One" scrawled on their backs. Mulder and Scully travel to investigate this aberrant behavior, though the strangest thing in this meat-producing area is a cult of vegetarian "walk-ins." Deep Throat's assassin, the Crew Cut Man (Lindsey Ginter) returns—this time working alone.
11	40	"Colony"	Nick Marck	Story by : David Duchovny & Chris Carter; Teleplay by : Chris Carter	February 10, 1995	2X16
At the beginning, a frozen Mulder is brought to a hospital. The episode flashes back to a scene two weeks before, where the crew of a research vessel find the wreckage of a UFO in the Beaufort Sea. The pilot who survives this crash walks out of the hospital and kills identical-looking doctors in various abortion clinics. Guest starring Peter Donat, Brian Thompson, Megan Leitch and Dana Gladstone.
12	41	"End Game"	Rob Bowman	Frank Spotnitz	February 17, 1995	2X17
An alien bounty hunter kidnaps Scully and wants to trade her for Mulder's sister, Samantha Mulder (Megan Leitch). Mulder asks for Skinner's help in making the trade, and has the FBI Director set up a sniper to take down the bounty hunter. Guest starring Peter Donat, Brian Thompson and Megan Leitch.
13	49	"Anasazi"	R. W. Goodwin	Story by : David Duchovny & Chris Carter; Teleplay by : Chris Carter	May 19, 1995	2X25
The trust that Mulder and Scully have is sorely tested when Mulder begins acting strangely. His aberrant behavior is compounded when the Lone Gunmen direct him to a hacker who managed to break into some very closely guarded files. The files are encoded in Navajo and need to be decoded by a former Navajo code talker.
14	50	"The Blessing Way"	R. W. Goodwin	Chris Carter	September 22, 1995	3X01
The Cigarette Smoking Man works quickly to recover the stolen computer files, but finds himself thwarted by a man who he hoped was dead. Meanwhile, Scully finds herself at a loss for her next step and turns to her family for support, since Mulder is otherwise engaged fighting for survival.
15	51	"Paper Clip"	Rob Bowman	Chris Carter	September 29, 1995	3X02
After Mulder and Scully are reunited, they investigate a photograph that seems to connect Mulder's father to experiments that were conducted after World War II but used scientific knowledge from Nazi Germany. Their search takes them to the abandoned Strughold Mining Facility where they uncover a dangerous secret.

== Special features ==
The X-Files Mythology, Volume 1 – Abduction
Set Details		Special Features
15 Episodes; 4-Disc Set; 1.78:1 Aspect Ratio; Subtitles: English; English (Dolby Digital 5.1 Surround)		Audio Commentaries (Dolby Digital 2.0 Stereo); "Deep Throat" – Chris Carter; "The Erlenmeyer Flask" – R. W. Goodwin; "Duane Barry" – Carter; "End Game" – Frank Spotnitz; "Anasazi" – Goodwin; Threads of Mythology; Mythology Timeline
Release Dates
Region 1	Region 2	Region 4
June 7, 2005	TBA	TBA
