= 14th ACTRA Awards =

Award for television and radio broadcasting

- Date: April 3, 1985
- Hosted by: Roger Abbott, Joyce Davidson

Highlights
- Best TV Program: Chautauqua Girl
- Best Radio Program: George Orwell: A Radio Biography

Television/radio coverage
- Network: CBC Television

The 14th ACTRA Awards were presented on April 3, 1985, to honour achievements in Canadian television and radio broadcasting in 1984. The ceremony was hosted by Roger Abbott and Joyce Davidson.

== Television ==
Best Television Program	Best Children's Television Program
Chautauqua Girl; Balconville; Tighten the Traces	The Boy and the Snow Goose; Hauntings; Today's Special
Best Television Actor	Best Television Actress
Douglas Rain, A Flush of Tories; Brent Carver, Passion of the Patriots; August Schellenberg, The Prodigal	Susan Wright, Slim Obsession; Joy Coghill, Ma; Janet-Laine Green, Chautauqua Girl
Best Continuing TV Performance	Best Supporting TV Performance
Tony Van Bridge, Judge; Martha Gibson, Seeing Things; Flo Paterson, Backstretch	Garrick Hagon, Rough Justice; Jean Archambault, Balconville; Patricia Phillips, Passion of the Patriots
Best TV Variety Performance	Best Television Host
Evelyn Hart, Romeo and Juliet; Judith Forst, Anna Bolena; Ann Mortifee, Born to Live	David Suzuki, Futurescan; Peter Gzowski, Fighting Words; Harry Rasky, Raymond Massey: Actor of the Century
Best Writing, Television Comedy/Variety	Best Writing, Television Drama
Laura Phillips, Fraggle Rock: "A Friend in Need"; Archie Cham and Paul Grosney, Bizarre; Jerry Juhl, Fraggle Rock: "All Work and All Play"	Don Truckey, Rough Justice; Jeannine Locke, Chautauqua Girl; Sharon Riis, Change of Heart
Best Writing, Television Public Affairs
Donald Brittain, Something to Celebrate; Russ Froese, The Journal: "Looting a Legacy"; Eric Malling, The Fifth Estate: "Secret Tests on the Street"

== Radio ==
Best Radio Program	Best Radio Host
George Orwell: A Radio Biography; Ideas: Weimar: A Celebration; Scales of Justice: "The Case of Antonio Scopelliti"	Peter Gzowski, Morningside; Vicki Gabereau, Variety Tonight; Bill McNeil, Fresh Air
Best Radio Actor	Best Radio Actress
Norman Browning, The Sweet Second Summer of Kitty Malone; Harvey Atkin, Scales of Justice: "The Case of Antonio Scopelliti"; Douglas Campbell, The Canterville Ghost	Charmion King, Jessie's Story; Jackie Burroughs, The Secret Life of Susannah Moodie; Nicky Guadagni, Scales of Justice: "Spring Flower"
Best Radio Variety Performance	Best Writing, Radio Drama
Mary Lou Fallis, Primadonna; Beth Anne Cole, Yvette Gilbert; Kathy Michael McGlynn, For the Love of Howard	Steve Petch, The Ice Forest; Bob Kroll, A Loyal Son of War; James W. Nichol, Prisons
Best Writing, Radio Variety	Best Writing, Radio Public Affairs
Dave Broadfoot, Don Ferguson, Gord Holtam, John Morgan and Rick Olsen, Royal Canadian Air Farce; Michael Boncoeur and Paul K. Willis, This Hour Has 17 Programs; Cliff Jones, For the Love of Howard	Edward Trapunski and George Woodcock, George Orwell: A Radio Biography; Jurgen Hesse, L'Arche: An Ark for the Poor Ones of the Forest; Jay Ingram, Quirks & Quarks: "The DNA Structure 30 Years Later"; Gary Marcuse, Ideas: "The Cold Wars in Canada"

== Journalism and special awards ==
Gordon Sinclair Award	Foster Hewitt Award
Hana Gartner, The Fifth Estate: "Vengeance Is Mine"; Eric Malling, The Fifth Estate: "Its Own Good Name"; Roy Bonisteel, Man Alive	Sue Prestedge; Dave Van Horne; Brian Williams
John Drainie Award
Fred Diehl
