= Janet-Laine Green =

Canadian actress

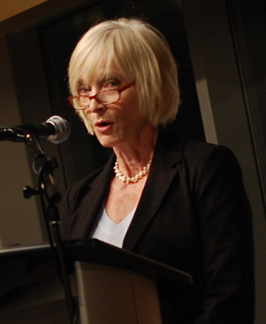
- Green reading an excerpt from "Good To A Fault" by Marina Endicott
- Born: Toronto, Ontario, Canada
- Occupations: Actress; director; producer; teacher; television personality
- Years active: 1977–present
- Spouse: Booth Savage
- Children: 2, including Tyrone Savage

Janet-Laine Green is a Canadian actress, director, producer, and teacher, active for over 25 years. Best known for her roles in She's the Mayor, Seeing Things and This is Wonderland, this Toronto-based film and television personality has also been a voice actress for animated series such as Jacob Two-Two (as Florence), Franklin, Little Bear (as Mother Bear) and The Care Bears (for which she voiced Wish Bear).

She also provided the voice of the arch villain Xayide in the animated version of The Neverending Story and also Void in WildC.A.T.S..

She has also worked as an associate producer on the film The Circle Game in which she also played as Anna.

Green has been nominated for three Gemini Awards and two Genie Awards.

She is also active on the Canadian stage. In fact, Theatre Saskatchewan has given the province's best stage actors, since 1992, a Lifetime Achievement Award named after her; Green even sponsors it.

She has a production company of her own, Briefcase Productions.

== Personal life ==
Green is married to actor Booth Savage, who wrote the play version of Pillow Talk, which Green is now starring in and producing, and has two children. Their son Tyrone Savage is also an actor.

== Filmography ==
=== Film ===
Year	Title	Role	Notes
1982	Love	Julia	Segment: Julia
1984	Chautauqua Girl	Sally Driscoll	ACTRA Award nominee for Best Television Actress, 14th ACTRA Awards
1985	The Care Bears Movie	Wish Bear	Voice only
1986	Care Bears Movie II: A New Generation	Wish Bear	Voice only
1986	Bullies	Jenny Morris	
1986	One Police Plaza	Janet Fox	TV film
1986	Murder Sees the Light	Aline	TV film
1987	The Believers	Lisa Jamison	
1987	The Kidnapping of Baby John Doe	Judy	TV film
1988	Cowboys Don't Cry	Lindsay Sutherland	
1990	Primo Baby	Ann Williams	
1992	Quiet Killer	Aunt Louise	TV film
1992	Vita da cane		
1992	The Diamond Fleece	Ms. Green	TV film
1992	The Shower	Louise	
1993	Medicine River	Ellen Lesly	TV film
1994	The Circle Game	Anna	
1995	When the Dark Man Calls	Sue Winston	TV film
1995	Fight for Justice: The Nancy Conn Story	Nancy's Mother	TV film
1996	Jungle Boy		Direct-to-video, voice only
1996	Undertaker		
1996	Swiss Family Robinson		Direct-to-video
1997	Little Bear: Meet Little Bear	Mother Bear	Direct-to-video, voice only
1997	Little Bear: Family Tales	Mother Bear	Direct-to-video, voice only
1997	End of Summer	Lucie/Christine's Cousin	TV film
1998	Moonlight Becomes You	Janice Moore	TV film
1998	Escape: Human Cargo	Pat	TV film
1998	Death in the Shadows	Ariane	TV film
1998	The Girl Next Door	Joyce Winters	TV film
1998	Little Bear: Parties & Picnics	Mother Bear	Direct-to-video, voice only
1998	Little Bear: Goodnight Little Bear	Mother Bear	Direct-to-video, voice only
1999	Babar: King of the Elephants	Queen Celeste	Voice only
1999	Striking Poses	April Indigo	Direct-to-video
1999	Little Bear: Summertime Tales	Mother Bear	Direct-to-video, voice only
1999	Little Bear: Little Goblin Bear	Mother Bear	Direct-to-video, voice only
1999	Little Bear: Friends	Mother Bear	Direct-to-video, voice only
2000	All-American Girl: The Mary Kay Letourneau Story	Mrs. Schmitz	TV film
2000	Enslavement: The True Story of Fanny Kemble	Elizabeth Sedgwick	TV film
2000	Thin Air	Professor Brighton	TV film
2000	Little Bear: Rainy Day Tales	Mother Bear	Direct-to-video, voice only
2000	Little Bear: A Kiss for Little Bear	Mother Bear	Direct-to-video, voice only
2000	Harry's Case		TV film
2001	Little Bear: Little Sherlock Bear	Mother Bear	Direct-to-video, voice only
2001	Haven	Eleanor Sayles	TV film
2001	The Little Bear Movie	Mother Bear	Direct-to-video, voice only
2001	Little Bear: Let's Play a Game	Mother Bear	Direct-to-video, voice only
2002	Terrorised by Teens: The Jonathan Wamback Story	Nora	TV film
2002	Little Bear: Snacktime Tales	Mother Bear	Direct-to-video, voice only
2002	Little Bear: Little Artist Bear	Mother Bear	Direct-to-video, voice only
2002	Little Bear: Campfire Tales	Mother Bear	Direct-to-video, voice only
2003	Little Bear: Feel Better, Little Bear	Mother Bear	Direct-to-video, voice only
2004	The Limit	Agent Henry	Direct-to-video
2004	Dead Lawyers	Kathryn Keillor	TV film
2005	Niagara Motel	Helen	
2007	I Me Wed	Lillian	TV film
2007	The Stone Angel	Lottie	
2010	Verona	Tish	Short film
2010	My Family's Secret	June Shaeffer	
2010	Four Sisters	Karen	Short film
2011	Secrets from Her Past	Marilyn	TV film
2012	Stand by Your Booth	Joan	TV film
2012	The Good Witch's Charm	Doris	TV film
2014	My Gal Sunday	Miriam Parker	TV film
2014	Wolves	Clara Tollerman	
2014	Dirty Singles	Joyce	Uncredited
2015	Born to Be Blue	Vera Baker	
2015	Hello, It's Me	Lillian	TV film
2016	Static	Lizzie	Short film
2018	At First Light	Grandma	
2019	Escaping the NXIVM Cult: A Mother's Fight to Save Her Daughter	Princess Elizabeth	TV film

=== Television ===
Year	Title	Role	Notes
1979	The Great Detective	Mrs. Lestrange	Episode: "The Case of the Magic Mandarin"
1981–87	Seeing Things	Heather Redfern	Series regular, 43 episodes
1985	Night Heat	Jennifer Breland	Episode: "Mother's Day"
1985	Care Bears	Wish Bear/Mary/Mrs. Miller/Tricia	Series regular, 11 episodes, voice only
1986	The Ray Bradbury Theater	Mrs. Leary	Episode: "The Screaming Woman"
1986	Hot Shots	Liz	Episode: "Writ of Habeas Corpse"
1986	The Care Bears Family	Wish Bear	Season 1 regular, 13 episodes, voice only
1987	Adderly	Lisa	Episode: "To Better Days"
1988	T. and T.	Louise	Episode: "Pros and Cons"
1988–90	The Beachcombers	Dana Battle	Series regular, 42 episodes
1991	Counterstrike	Claire Sinclair	Episodes: "The Dilemma" & "It's All in the Game"
1991	Beyond Reality		Episode: "The Cold"
1991	Tropical Heat	Estelle Clay	Episode: "Abandoned"
1993	Family Pictures	Toni Baker	Mini-series, 2 episodes
1993	The Hidden Room	Lucy	Episode: "Dangerous Dreams"
1993	Street Legal	Marisa Stevens	Episodes: "Hasta La Vista" & "But Not Forgotten"
1993	E.N.G.	Diane Terlain	Episode: "Crime and Punishment"
1993	Secret Service	Wolsten	Episode: "Advertising for Crime/Special Delivery"
1993–94	Kung Fu: The Legend Continues	Annie Blaisdell	Episodes: "Sunday at the Hotel with George", "Blind Eye" & "Retribution"
1994	Liberty Street	Annie's Mom	Episode: "Planes, Kids and Automobiles"
1994–95	Wild C.A.T.s	Void	Series regular, 14 episodes, voice only
1995	Road to Avonlea	Eliza Pike	Episode: "The Return of Gus Pike"
1995	Ultraforce	Contrary	Episode: "Prime Time"
1995–96	The Neverending Story	Xayide	Recurring role, 9 episodes, voice only
1995–2001	Little Bear	Mother Bear	Series regular
1997–98	Diabolik	Micky	Recurring role, 8 episodes, voice only
1998	Goosebumps	Martha Morgan	Episode: "Strained Peas"
1998	PSI Factor: Chronicles of the Paranormal	Dr. Joanne Bester	Episode: "Jaunt"
1998	The Adventures of Shirley Holmes	Stratmann's Attorney	Episode: "The Case Of The Code Of Silence"
1998	The Adventures of Shirley Holmes	Ruth Monroe	Episode: "The Case Of The Bamboozling Blonde"
1998–99	Earth: Final Conflict	Dr. Melissa Park	Recurring role, 5 episodes
1998–2000	Mythic Warriors	Hera/Mother/Seagull	Recurring role, 5 episodes, voice only
1999	Tales from the Cryptkeeper	Mom	Episode: "Town Gathering", voice only
1999	Traders	Catherine Cunningham	Recurring role, 8 episodes
2000	Anne of Green Gables: The Continuing Story	Maud Montrose	Mini-series, 2 episodes
2001	Babar	Queen Celeste	Series regular, 13 episodes, voice only
2001	Blue Murder	Lidi Delillo	Episode: "Summer of Love"
2001–02	Doc	Elaine	Episodes: "You Say Goodbye, I Say Hello", "No Time Like the Present" & "Time Flies"
2003	Mutant X	Senator Morrison	Episode: "One Step Closer"
2003	Playmakers	Miss Duberstein	Episode: "Choice: Part 2"
2003–06	Jacob Two-Two	Florence	Recurring role, 11 episodes, voice only
2004	Blue Murder	Alice Weston	Episode: "Special Delivery"
2004	Franklin	Narrator	Series regular, 10 episodes, voice only
2004–06	This Is Wonderland	Judge Serkis	Series regular, 21 episodes
2005–08	Delilah & Julius		Series regular, 31 episodes, voice only
2008	M.V.P.	Carla	Recurring role, 5 episodes
2011	She's the Mayor	Iris Peters	Series regular, 13 episodes
2011	Haven	Felicia Brody	Episode: "Sparks and Recreation"
2013–15	Murdoch Mysteries	Mrs. Lynd	Episodes: "Murdoch on the Corner" & "The Incurables"
2015	Saving Hope	Iris Pratt	Episode: "Trading Places"
2015–16	This Life	Janine Lawson	Series regular, 20 episodes

=== Video games ===
Year	Title	Role	Publisher	Notes
1999	M.U.G.E.N		Elecbyte	Voice only
1999	Transformer Beast Wars Metals: Gekitotsu! Gangan Battle	Blackarachnia/Airazor/Predacon Computer	Takara	Voice only
1999	Little Bear: Kindergarten Thinking Adventures	Mother Bear	Creative Wonders	Voice only

== Awards and nominations ==
Year	Award	Category	Work	Result
1984	14th ACTRA Awards	Best Television Actress	Chautauqua Girl	Nominated
1986	1st Gemini Awards	Best Performance by a Lead Actress in a Continuing Role in a Comedy Series	Seeing Things	Nominated
1987	2nd Gemini Awards	Best Performance by a Lead Actress in a Continuing Role in a Comedy Series	Seeing Things	Nominated
1989	10th Genie Awards	Best Supporting Actress	Cowboys Don't Cry	Nominated
1992	13th Genie Awards	Best Actress	The Shower	Nominated
2000	15th Gemini Awards	Best Performance by an Actress in a Guest Role in a Dramatic Series	Traders	Nominated
