= Holiday Ranch =

Canadian television program

- Written by: Fred Diehl
- Starring: Cliff McKay; Frannie Wright
- Country of origin: Canada
- No. of seasons: 5

Production
- Producers: Loyd Brydon; Bob Jarvis
- Running time: 60 minutes

Original release
- Network: CBC
- Release: 1953 – 1958

Holiday Ranch is a Canadian television country music-themed variety program airing on the CBC from 1953 to 1958. The show initially aired on weeknights and then moved to a weekly Saturday night schedule before Hockey Night in Canada.

The set of the series was a ranch house, and the plot featured a set of regulars who visited the ranch each week. The production cost was approximately $5000 per episode.

The show was considered among the most popular in 1950s Canadian television.
