= Jacob Two-Two (TV series) =

Canadian 2003 children's animated TV series

- Title frame for Jacob Two-Two
- Also known as: Jacob Jacob
- Genre: Comedy
- Based on: Jacob Two-Two by Mordecai Richler
- Directed by: Lan Lamon; Helen Lebeau; Eric Flaherty
- Voices of: Billy Rosemberg; Marc McMulkin; Kaitlin Howell; Jeff Berg; Robert Tinkler; Jocelyn Barth; Harvey Atkin; Janet-Laine Green; Julie Lemieux; Kristopher Clark; Dwayne Hill; Fiona Reid; Howard Jerome; Bret "The Hitman" Hart; James Rankin
- Theme music composer: Martin Kucaj – Eurotrash Music
- Composer: Martin Kucaj – Eurotrash Music
- Country of origin: Canada
- Original language: English
- No. of seasons: 5
- No. of episodes: 62 (list of episodes)

Production
- Executive producers: Paul Robertson (seasons 1–2); Doug Murphy; Scott Dyer; Peter Moss; Michael Hirsh (season 1); Vince Commisso (season 5); Steven Jarosz (season 5)
- Producers: Wendy Errington (seasons 1–3); Marilyn McAuley (season 5)
- Editor: Jamie Ebata
- Running time: 22–25 minutes
- Production companies: Nelvana Limited; 9 Story Entertainment (season 5)

Original release
- Network: YTV
- Release: September 7, 2003 – May 19, 2006

Jacob Two-Two is a 2003 Canadian animated television series based on the Jacob Two-Two book series written by Mordecai Richler. After Jacob and his family moved to Montreal from England, he encountered new challenges in his hometown. Jacob, his siblings, and his mother were named after Richler's children and wife.

Nelvana and 9 Story Entertainment produced the series's 62 episodes, in association with YTV and Salter Street Films. Funbag Animation Studio Inc., Atomic Cartoons (before Atomic Betty), and Nitrogen Studios provided animation.

== Characters ==
=== Jacob's family ===
Jacob Two-Two

The youngest of five children, Jacob got his 'Two-Two' nickname because he always had to say everything twice to be heard amongst his large family when he was smaller. Now a little older, Jacob does not repeat himself as often, but still frequently falls back into this old habit. He inadvertently causes trouble because he always tells the truth. He looks up to his siblings, especially Daniel (though he often feels left out of their activities), and wishes he had their experience and wisdom. His naïveté makes him a frequent target of his twin siblings, Noah and Emma, and their fantastic yarns. Voiced and narrated by Billy Rosemberg, best known in the United States as the voice of Max from Max & Ruby.

Morty

Loosely based on author and creator Mordecai Richler, Jacob's father is the writer of a series of adventure books about "The Amazing Ronald." He spends his time in his home office working out complex plots for his books, checking the hockey scores for his favorite team, the Montreal Marvels (parody of the Montreal Canadiens), or most often snoozing on the sofa with the newspaper draped over his face. He also loves jokes and making gentle fun of his children. Voiced by Harvey Atkin.

Florence

Jacob's mother is an expert juggler of tasks, happiest when operating at full throttle. Besides keeping her family on the go and organized, she also holds down a full-time job. As busy as she is, Florence always manages to look very chic and 'pulled together', and breezes through each day with effortless grace. In the episodes "Jacob Two-Two and Spellbound Sibling" and "Jacob Two-Two and the Pet Peeve", she is revealed to be allergic to cats. Voiced by Janet-Laine Green.

Daniel

The eldest sibling, Daniel, is an aloof and hopelessly cynical teen. Permanently garbed in black with blue hair, he is fully conversant in all the newest bands and music crazes. Daniel does not have much time for Jacob, but occasionally offers his youngest brother a unique "teen view" of the world. He was first voiced by Jeff Berg and later voiced by Rob Tinkler.

Marfa

Jacob's elder sister, who is both academically and artistically inclined. Marfa is suffering through the toughest teen years and frequently takes it out on everyone around her. Preoccupied with her own concerns, Marfa has even less time for Jacob than Daniel. Convinced that Jacob ruins everything he touches, she does not like him going anywhere near her stuff. To Jacob, she occupies a mysterious world that he does not understand at all. Voiced by Jocelyn Barth.

Noah and Emma

Jacob's elder twin brother and sister. Energetic, athletic, full of daring and theatrical bravado. They have their secret club, Kid Power, and spend long hours in their clubhouse in the yard fighting imaginary battles as their alter egos, the intrepid Shapiro (Emma) and the fearless O'Toole (Noah). They only let Jacob join their club when there's a job they either don't want to handle or know he can handle. He often does their bidding in the hope that maybe this time they will let him inside. Noah is voiced by Marc McMulkin. Emma is voiced by Kaitlin Howell.

Auntie Good-For-You

Jacob's aunt, who imposes her health-focused habits on Jacob's family. Whenever she babysits the siblings, she prohibits activities she deems unhealthy, like watching TV or using the internet. Each morning, she wakes them up with the sound of bagpipes and makes them do nine hundred jumping jacks. She has a strong preference for health shakes and bagpipe music. She often twists familiar phrases, mixing up expressions like "a sight for sore feet" and "busy little butterflies." Auntie Good-For-You affectionately calls Jacob "Jakey-poo" and often invades his personal space. It's suggested that Florence and Morty aren't fond of her; when she tries to offer them health shakes, they hurriedly rush out the door. Her real name is unknown nor mentioned.

Zadie Saul

Jacob's paternal grandfather, who comes around when Morty is preparing bagels.

=== Allies ===
Buford Orville Gaylord Pugh

An odd little kid with a string of unfortunate names. His lack of anxiety and worries is not due to a lack of intelligence but to difficulty focusing. He is prone to recounting pointless, meandering, shaggy-dog stories. Buford and Jacob are both new kids at school. He is Jacob's best friend. He also has a mother, who he mentioned but who remains unseen. Furthermore, he mentioned that he has a father, but also unseen in the second episode, 'Jacob Two-Two and the Staff Room of Doom'. He has also mentioned unseen aunts, cousins, and uncles. Voiced by Kristopher Clark.

Renée Ratelle

Though Renée and Jacob initially find themselves at odds with each other when they meet as classmates, Renée later joins forces with Jacob and Buford to solve a mystery. Since Renée is a hothead who does not always look before she leaps, it becomes Jacob's role to temper her enthusiasm. We know that she's French-Canadian due to her name and the way she speaks. Like Florence, Renée is allergic to cats. She is voiced by Julie Lemieux.

X. Barnaby Dinglebat

A mild-mannered meter reader for the Montreal Gas Company on the surface, Dinglebat lets Jacob in on his secret profession: he is really an international spy. He is the only adult Jacob knows who always has time for him and treats him as an equal. Barnaby opens up a whole new world of adventure and possibility to his next-door neighbour. Voiced by James Rankin.

Agent Intrepid

Dinglebat's pet hamster, who is also a secret agent.

Miss Darling Sweetiepie

A nice, kind old lady who is Jacob's neighbor. Despite her elderly appearance, she is actually a secret agent.

Gary a.k.a. The Hooded Fang

The professional wrestler with the terrifying mask and bad guy image. His true nature, as Jacob discovers one day, is sweet and gentle. He only acts like a barbarian because it's written in his contract. He's really a big kid at heart, and becomes a great secret pal of Jacob's, occasionally helping out when a mission requires someone really huge. Voiced by Bret Hart.

Claude LaToque

The ghost of a coureur des bois (Canadian woodsman) who occasionally comes to Jacob's rescue.

=== Antagonists ===
Principal I.M. Greedyguts

The principal of Dreary Meadows Elementary School is the series's most recurring antagonist. Greedyguts has an enduring dislike of children, which leads him to be rather severe with his pupils, meting out harsher punishments. He is a glutton and suffers from obesity due to eating a ton, and has trouble fitting through doors. Beyond his fondness for eating, his greed also extends to material possessions. He also owns a giant SUV that can hurt the kids. He's voiced by Dwayne Hill.

P.L. "Perfectly Loathsome" Leo Louse

Leo works as the janitor at the school. When Greedyguts needs dirty work done or a mess swept under the carpet, Leo is the man for the job. A weaselly man, a miser and mooch, Leo will swipe whatever isn't nailed down. Morty is mysteriously fond of Leo, much to both Florence and the children's disgust, and whenever Leo drops by, he'll fill his pockets with Florence's sandwiches. He is voiced by Howard Jerome.

Ms. Sour Pickle

Jacob's geography teacher, Miss Sour Pickle, has a permanent scowl plastered on her face, like she smells something bad. She glories in catching her students not paying attention or talking in class, then giving them snap quizzes on the obscure capitals of equally obscure countries. The only thing Sour Pickle loves to do more than torment Jacob is cheer for her favourite team, the marvelous Montreal Marvels. It's her biggest secret that she simply adores hockey. She is voiced by Fiona Reid.

Wilson, Quiggley, and Duschane

Three bullies who always pick on Jacob and his friends (on rare occasions, they serve as allies to Jacob, but usually as antagonists). Wilson is the shortest one, the de facto leader, and mostly the brains, who is always seen with a sour apple lollipop in his mouth and wears a hockey jersey that mostly represents the Montreal Canadiens red/home jersey. Quiggley is the kid with his hair covering his eyes. Duschane is the boy with braces and is the tallest. They often call Jacob "Jacob Boo-Hoo" or "Jacob Two-Four".

Carl Fester King

A pompous con man dressed in king garb and accountant style, desiring money.

Fish & Fowl

A criminal duo that commits crimes to get quick money. Fish's appearance is based on a fish, and Fowl's appearance is based on a bird.

Y.B. Greedyguts

Principal Greedyguts's identical twin brother, sharing both his appearance and voice. At first, Y.B. is depicted as a kind and gentle person who invites the students and staff of Dreary Meadows to his "school," called "Cheery Meadows." However, Jacob, Buford, and Renee are unable to attend because I.M. prevents them from going. During a match between the Dreary Meadows and Cheery Meadows hockey teams, however, the true nature of Y.B. is revealed when Miss Sour Pickle manages to escape his grasp, informing Jacob, Buford, and Renee that, compared to I.M., Y.B. is actually much worse. His "school" is really a dirty power plant where the rest of the students and staff are trapped and forced to produce electricity for his profit. The teachers don't even receive coffee breaks, and Miss Sour Pickle describes the situation as an "endless nightmare." Following Jacob, Buford, and Renee's victory over Y.B.'s team from Cheery Meadows, the remaining students and staff are liberated from Cheery Meadows and transferred back to Dreary Meadows.

=== Other characters ===
Mr. Molecules

Jacob's science teacher has a quirky personality, as evidenced by his UFO-shaped mobile lab and unusual experiments. Despite his eccentricity, he is the kindest teacher to Jacob and his friends, much to Greedyguts's dismay. Throughout the series, Mr. Molecules has created many inventions, most of which either fail or lead to chaotic outcomes.

Nurse Bunyan

The school nurse who has a crush on Leo Louse.

Miss Bella Bountiful

The school's lunch lady, who is kind and sweet and serves the kids healthy, delicious lunches.

Superintendent Fussbudget

The superintendent of the school board is responsible for managing the budget of Dreary Meadows Elementary School. She strongly dislikes Principal Greedyguts.

Ann

An android (hence her name) from Japan designed to be the perfect student. Voiced by Tajja Isen.

Brainy

An intelligent student who is a fan of the comics Jacob loves.

Lloyd

An overweight, arrogant student who is a fan of the comics that Jacob loves.

Melinda Green

A mathematics genius who helped Jacob in the Scholars for Dollars training. She has an older sister named Phoebe, who Daniel has a crush on.

Miss Louse

Leo's miserly mother, who regrets having him as a son.

Benny

Morty's friend, who also owns a bagel restaurant. He and Morty occasionally play poker with Leo.

== Episodes ==
Season	Episodes	Originally released	
Season	Episodes	First released	Last released
1	13	September 7, 2003	November 30, 2003
2	13	February 22, 2004	June 22, 2004
3	13	October 7, 2004	January 30, 2005
4	13	February 3, 2005	January 16, 2006
5	10	September 20, 2005	May 19, 2006

== Telecast ==
Jacob Two-Two first aired in Canada on September 7, 2003 on YTV, and its final episode was broadcast on May 19, 2006 after a total of five seasons, with reruns continuing until 2009. The show was also broadcast on the French-language network VRAK.TV as Jacob Jacob.

In March 2004, Fox Kids Europe acquired the pay television rights to the show's first two seasons for the United Kingdom, Ireland, Scandinavia, Italy, Germany, Spain, Portugal, and the Netherlands.

In the United States, the show debuted on January 9, 2005 as Jacobo Dos-Dos on the Spanish-language network Telemundo through its Telemundo Kids block. In 2006, it was announced that AOL's KOL service was set to launch the series in May, making it the first English-language U.S. distribution deal for this property. On September 9, 2006, the series made its English-language television premiere as a launch title for the Qubo programming block on NBC. Simultaneously, following the discontinuation Telemundo Kids, the Spanish-language dub transitioned to Telemundo’s Qubo block on September 10, 2006, while i: Independent Television (now Ion Television) also began airing the series on September 15, 2006. Reruns continued on the companion Qubo Channel from January 14, 2007, to December 30, 2017.

== Reception ==
Jacob Two-Two received positive reviews from critics and audiences.

Deirdre Sheppard of Common Sense Media gave the show a rating of three stars out of five, saying it "successfully conveys useful life lessons in each episode, making it a fine choice for grade-schoolers." She also noted that the sibling rivalries are "sometimes overplayed" and the "name-calling and occasional slight innuendoes between Jacob's parents might raise a few parental eyebrows." On the other hand, in addition to "boasting hip music and cool animation," she remarks that the show is something "most kids should be able to relate to."
