= Cowboys Don't Cry (film) =

- DVD Cover
- Directed by: Anne Wheeler
- Written by: Marilyn Halvorson; Anne Wheeler
- Produced by: Arvi Liimatainen; Janis Platt
- Starring: Ron White; Zachary Ansley
- Cinematography: Brian R.R. Hebb
- Edited by: Peter Svab
- Music by: Louis Natale
- Production companies: Atlantis Films; Telefilm Canada
- Distributed by: Cineplex Odeon; CBC Television
- Release date: February 5, 1988
- Running time: 103 minutes
- Country: Canada
- Language: English
- Budget: $2.9 million

Cowboys Don't Cry is a Canadian drama film, directed by Anne Wheeler and released in 1988. The film is based on a novel by Marilyn Halvorson. It stars Ron White, Zachary Ansley, Rebecca Jenkins, Janet-Laine Green and Thomas Hauff. The film received four Genie Award nominations at the 10th Genie Awards in 1989.

== Plot ==
The film centres on Josh Morgan (Ron White), a rodeo clown, and former rodeo champion whose relationship with his son, Shane (Zachary Ansley), is strained after his wife, Lucy (Rebecca Jenkins), is killed in a car accident caused by his drunk driving. After the accident, he sinks into depression and self-pity. In the wake of the tragedy of Lucy's death, Shane struggles to pick up the pieces and make up for Josh's shortcomings. When Shane's grandfather dies, leaving a small ranch in his will, he hopes that his dream of settling down happily in one place, might come true after all. But how can a 14-year-old boy turn the run-down place around and keep the banker from seizing it, while attending school and looking after a father who is usually in the liability column?

== Cast ==
- Ron White...Josh Morgan
- Zachary Ansley...Shane Morgan
- Rebecca Jenkins...Lucy Morgan
- Janet-Laine Green...Lindsay Sutherland
- Candace Ratcliffe...Casey Sutherland
- Thomas Hauff...Roger Sutherland
- Valerie Pearson...Janet
- Joshua Ansley...Young Shane Morgan
- Michael Hogan...Ron Grady
- Janet Wright...Pearl
- Barney O'Sullivan...Mr. Edwards
- Wendall Smith...Matt Wiley
- Graham McPherson...Mr. Zaharchuk
- Thomas Peacocke...Mr. Thorpe
- Jason Wolff...Pete
- Georgie Collins...Ms. Chapman
- William Korbut...Charlie
- Ruby Swekla...Mrs. Pasok

== Background and production ==
Director Anne Wheeler said she had "several directing offers", and chose this film because Atlantis agreed to let her write the screenplay and direct the film too. Wheeler said that she "wanted the challenge of writing a feature-length script because I hadn't done that before". She also said her "first drafts were weak", because she "stereotyped the male characters". She noted that she had to put herself in "their position" and just ignore the "fact that they were men", because "if you start thinking of them as 'the other', you fall into stereotypes and the same patterns that have been shown time and time again".

Marilyn Halvorson, who wrote the novel the film is based on, criticized Wheeler's screenplay for "shifting the focus away from the teenage protagonist to the problems of the father". For her part, Wheeler just "shrugged off" Halvorson's irritation with the screenplay, saying she "took the intent of the book seriously", but in her view, the "script has to work for me", and the actors didn't "see any conflict either".

A large portion of the film was shot on location in Pincher Creek, in southern Alberta, Canada.

== Release ==
The film premiered in Calgary, Alberta on February 5, 1988, as part of the cultural festival for the 1988 Winter Olympics, and had theatrical screenings in selected other cities before airing on CBC Television in November.

== Reception ==
Greg Burliuk from the Kingston Whig-Standard said the director is "making a statement about how some men refuse to grow up", and the relationship between father and son is not some "Hollywood father-and-son relationship". He notes how the pair "spit and fight like dogs". He complimented Ron White as being "completely believable", and also Zachary Ansley as young Shane. He praised the photography as "stunning", and "a moving human story" as well.

Jay Scott from The Globe and Mail criticized the film for being "relentlessly simplistic", and opined that the film "doesn't quite reach melodrama; it expires somewhere south of soap opera, in a plot that includes foreclosures and a mare damaged by barbed wire. The message is, of course, that feelings need to be expressed, but even in 'a new family drama', there ought to be more content than a single bald statement to the effect that Cowboys Do Too Boo Hoo".

Film critic Mike Boone of the Montreal Gazette, lauded the film for its "authenticity with on-location shooting", and said actor Zachary Ansley was "excellent" in his role as the son. Overall, he said the "struggle [between father and son] tends to drag occasionally", but it is a "very good family drama".

== Awards ==
The film garnered four Genie Award nominations at the 10th Genie Awards in 1989: Best Actor (Ansley), Best Supporting Actress (Green), Best Director (Wheeler) and Best Original Song (Wheeler and Louis Natale, for "Cowboys Don't Cry"). At the 14th annual Alberta Film and Television Awards, it was also awarded with best of the festival by four judges contracted by the Alberta Motion Picture Industry Association.
