= Michael Norell =

American screenwriter, actor and executive producer (1937–2023)

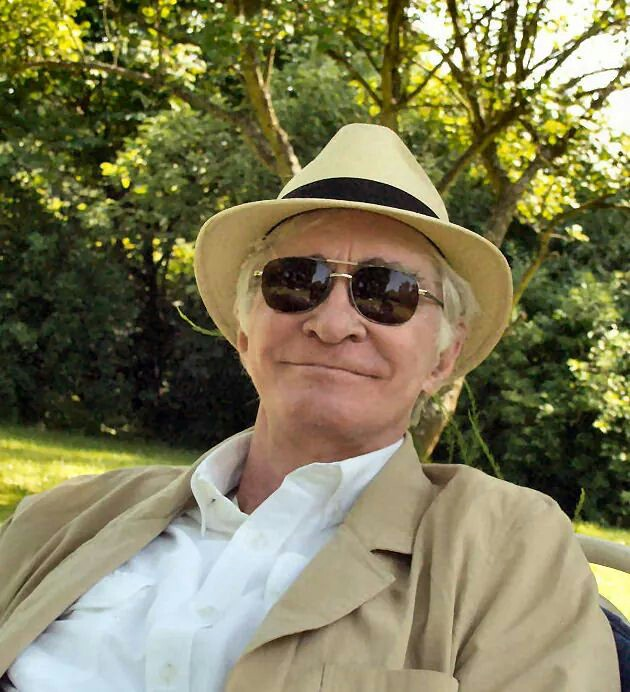
- Norell in 2017
- Born: Michael Alden Norell; October 4, 1937; Wallace, Idaho, U.S.
- Died: May 12, 2023 (aged 85); Huntingdon, Pennsylvania, U.S.
- Occupations: Actor; screenwriter; executive producer
- Years active: 1972–2001

Michael Alden Norell (October 4, 1937 – May 12, 2023) was an American screenwriter, actor, and executive producer who starred as Captain Henry "Hank" Stanley on the television series Emergency!, produced by Jack Webb from 1972 to 1978.

== Life and career ==
Norell was born in Wallace, Idaho on October 4, 1937, to mother Wilma Helen Snook (1905–2001) and father James Alden Norell (1908–1989). His family, including brother James, moved to follow his father who was in the Army, and who ultimately retired with the rank of Brigadier General. His father was sent to Korea during the war. The family lived in Tokyo, Japan. Norell returned to the States after the war and attended Falls Church High School in Virginia where he acted in several school plays. He attended college at Washington and Lee University where he majored in journalism.

After graduating college Norell entered the Army where he spent the next five years, leaving with the rank of captain. After his stint in the Army he went to work for the Richmond Times-Dispatch. He went to New York City not too long after returning to civilian life and worked at acting full-time. Six months later he arrived in Hollywood where he won the role of Captain Henry "Hank" Stanley for the show Emergency!.

In addition to acting in the show, Norell also wrote four episodes of Emergency! which began his career as a screenwriter. Norell commented on the show's writing process, "I would be invited by [executive producer] Bob Cinader to pitch ideas. You'd spend an hour or two throwing out ideas for rescues and hospital stories and firehouse stories and eventually there were enough that he liked and he'd tell you to go to work. A couple of weeks later, you'd turn in a first draft." All rewrites were handled by other writers.

After Emergency! ended, Norell turned to screenwriting. He wrote for shows such as The Love Boat, Love Boat: The Next Wave, Nash Bridges, and The Magnificent Seven, among others. His screenwriting credits also include several made-for-TV movies such as Doomsday Rock, Three on a Date, The Covergirl and the Cop, Pals, Barnum, Christmas Comes to Willow Creek, and The Incident for which he was nominated for an Emmy Award. Other films include The Diamond Fleece, Long Gone, and Against Her Will: An Incident in Baltimore. Norell created and was executive producer for the short-lived Love Boat clone Aloha Paradise.

Norell died in Huntingdon, Pennsylvania, on May 12, 2023, at the age of 85.

== Filmography ==
Year	Title	Role
1973	Police Story	The Federal Man (1 episode)
1972-1978	Emergency!	Captain Hank Stanley (110 episodes)
