= Pilot (The X-Files) =

Pilot episode of The X-Files

- The X-Files episode
- FBI Special Agent Dana Scully meets fellow agent Fox Mulder, who has a special interest in unexplained and possibly paranormal phenomena.
- Episode no.: Season 1 Episode 1
- Directed by: Robert Mandel
- Written by: Chris Carter
- Production code: 1X79
- Original air date: September 10, 1993
- Running time: 48 minutes

Guest appearances
- Charles Cioffi as Scott Blevins; Cliff DeYoung as Dr. Jay Nemman; Sarah Koskoff as Theresa Nemman; Leon Russom as Detective Miles; Zachary Ansley as Billy Miles; William B. Davis as The Smoking Man

Episode chronology
← Previous —	Next → "Deep Throat"
- The X-Files season 1

"Pilot" is the pilot episode of the science fiction television series The X-Files. The episode aired on September 10, 1993, on the Fox network in the United States and Canada. The episode was written by series creator Chris Carter and directed by Robert Mandel. As the pilot, it would set up the mythology storyline for the series. The episode earned a Nielsen rating of 7.9 and was viewed by 7.4 million households and 12.0 million viewers. The episode was generally well received by fans and critics alike, leading to a growing cult following for the series before it hit the mainstream.

The pilot introduced the two main characters, Fox Mulder and Dana Scully, who were portrayed by David Duchovny and Gillian Anderson, respectively. The episode also featured William B. Davis, Charles Cioffi, and Zachary Ansley as the recurring characters of the Smoking Man, Scott Blevins, and Billy Miles. The episode follows FBI agents Mulder and Scully on their first X-File case together, investigating a string of deaths which Mulder believes to be experiments by an extraterrestrial intelligence.

Inspired by Kolchak: The Night Stalker, the series was conceived by Carter in an attempt to "scare people's pants off." When creating the characters of Mulder and Scully, Carter decided to play against established stereotypes, making the male character a believer and the female a skeptic, as the latter role had traditionally been a male one on television. Principal photography for "Pilot" took place over fourteen days in March 1993 with a budget of US$2 million; the scenes were filmed in and around the Vancouver area. Vancouver would remain the area for production for the next five years, although production would move to Los Angeles from the beginning of the sixth season at the behest of Duchovny.

== Plot ==
Outside the Oregon town of Bellefleur, teenager Karen Swenson is seen fleeing through the forest at night. When she falls, a dark figure approaches, and they both become enveloped in light. Swenson's body is later found by Bellefleur detectives, with two small marks on her lower back.

Later, in Washington, D.C., FBI Special Agent Dana Scully (Gillian Anderson) is summoned to a meeting with Division Chief Scott Blevins (Charles Cioffi). She is reassigned from her teaching position to work with fellow Special Agent Fox Mulder (David Duchovny) on the "X-Files", an obscure FBI section covering unexplained phenomena. Blevins makes it clear to Scully that he expects her to discredit Mulder, regarded by his superiors as a gadfly.

Scully introduces herself to Mulder, who shows her evidence from the Swenson case. He notes that Swenson was the fourth member of her high school class to die under mysterious circumstances. He also notes an unknown organic compound found in the tissue surrounding the marks on her body, as well as similarities between her death and others from across the country. Mulder believes that Swenson's death is due to extraterrestrial activity. However, the skeptical Scully expresses disbelief in Mulder's theory.

When Mulder and Scully's plane flies over Bellefleur, it encounters unexplained turbulence. As they drive through the woods near the town, the agents' car radio goes haywire; Mulder marks the spot of this event by spray-painting an "X" on the road. Mulder arranges for the exhumation of the third victim, Ray Soames, despite the protests of Dr. Jay Nemman, the county medical examiner. When Soames' coffin is opened, a desiccated, malformed body is found inside, which Scully concludes is not Soames, but possibly an orangutan. She finds a grey metallic implant in the body's nasal cavity.

Mulder and Scully visit the psychiatric hospital where Soames was committed before his death and meet two of his former classmates—the comatose Billy Miles (Zachary Ansley) and wheelchair-using Peggy O'Dell. O'Dell suffers a nosebleed and is seen to have marks similar to Swenson's. Outside the hospital, Mulder explains to Scully that he believes Miles, O'Dell, and the victims to be alien abductees.

That night, the agents investigate the forest; Scully discovers ash on the ground, leading her to suspect cult activity. However, a local detective arrives and orders them to leave. Driving back to their motel, Mulder and Scully encounter a bright flash of light, and their car loses power at the same spot where Mulder had earlier spray-painted the "X." Mulder realizes that nine minutes have disappeared after the flash, a phenomenon reported by alien abductees.

At the motel, Mulder tells Scully that his sister, Samantha, suddenly vanished when he was twelve years old, which has driven his efforts to investigate paranormal cases. The agents receive an anonymous call to inform them that O'Dell has died. At the scene, they are informed that she was killed running into traffic and realize that she was killed at the exact moment they had experienced the flash on the road. Mulder is informed that the desiccated body has been stolen from the morgue. The agents return to their motel to find it ablaze, and all their evidence destroyed.

Nemman's daughter, Theresa, contacts the agents for help. She tells them that she has awakened in the middle of the woods several times, fears for her life, and admits to having the same marks; she also develops a nosebleed. Nemman and the detective, revealed to be Billy's father, arrive and take her away. The agents wonder about the bodies of the first two victims and return to the cemetery; they find the graves already dug up and the coffins missing. Mulder realizes that Billy is responsible for bringing the victims to the woods. There, they again encounter Detective Miles but hear a scream. Mulder and Detective Miles find Billy nearby with Theresa in his arms. There is a flash of light, and Billy and Theresa are recovered unharmed.

A couple of weeks later, Billy is put under hypnosis. He recalls how he and his classmates were abducted in the forest as they celebrated their graduation. The teenagers had been subjected to tests by the aliens and were killed when the tests failed. Scully provides Blevins with the metal implant, the only remaining piece of evidence. She later learns from Mulder that Billy's case files are missing.

The episode ends with an unnamed agent (William B. Davis), seen at the beginning in Scully's briefing with Blevins, storing the implant amongst other identical ones in a vast evidence room within the Pentagon.

== Production ==
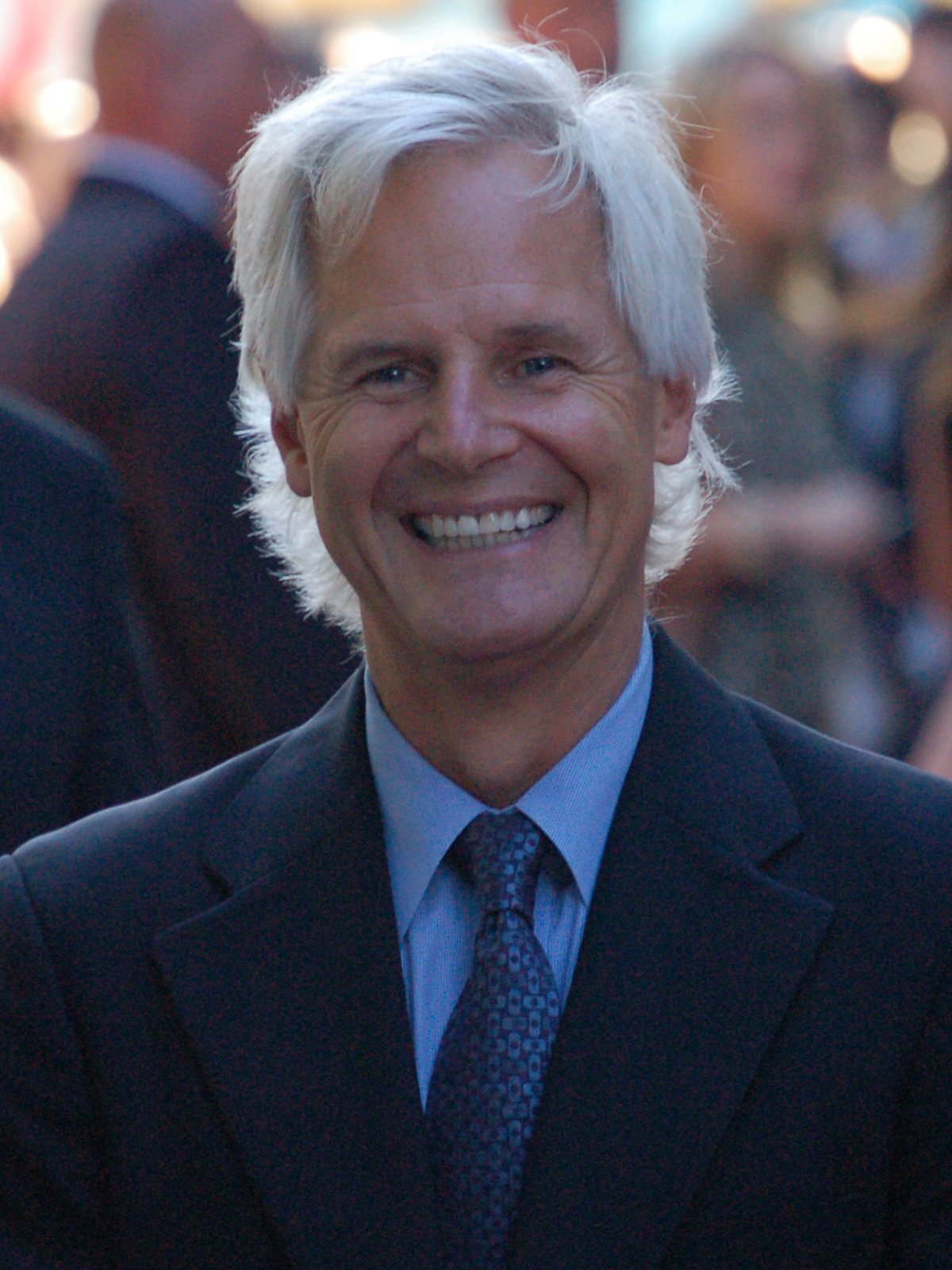
Chris Carter conceived and wrote the X-Files's pilot episode, taking inspiration from the 1970s series Kolchak: The Night Stalker.

=== Pre-production ===
When conceiving the episode, Chris Carter wanted to "scare people's pants off." A notable influence on the episode's conception was Kolchak: The Night Stalker, a series from the 1970s. This led to the idea of two agents investigating paranormal events. When creating the characters of Fox Mulder and Dana Scully, Carter decided to play against established stereotypes, making the male character a believer and the female a skeptic, as the latter role had traditionally been a male one on television.

When casting the actors for the two main roles, Carter had difficulty finding an actress for Scully. When he cast Gillian Anderson for the part, the Fox network wanted to replace her. Carter believed they responded negatively towards the casting because "she didn't have the obvious qualities that network executives have come to associate with hit shows." During Anderson's audition, Carter felt that she was a "terrific actress," and in a later interview, he noted: "She came in and read the part with a seriousness and intensity that I knew the Scully character had to have and I knew [...] she was the right person for the part." David Duchovny, on the other hand, was met with a more positive response from Fox, with Carter even saying he was an "early favorite." William B. Davis, who made his first appearance as the recurring villain The Smoking Man in this episode, had originally auditioned for a larger part in the episode, saying, "I auditioned for the senior FBI agent who had three lines. I didn't get that part—I got the part with no lines."

=== Filming ===
Principal photography for "Pilot" took place over fourteen days in March 1993, with a budget of US$2 million. Filming for the episode took place in and around Vancouver, British Columbia, Canada. The series would use the Vancouver area for production for the next five years, although production would move to Los Angeles from the beginning of the sixth season at the behest of Duchovny.

The scene set in the Bellefleur graveyard was shot in Queen Elizabeth Park, marking the first time the location had been used to represent a graveyard; the location would later be used for the same purpose in the fourth season episode "Kaddish." The interior shots of the psychiatric hospital were filmed in a disused building owned by Riverview Hospital in Coquitlam, marking the first time the crew met producer R. W. Goodwin. The episode's final warehouse scene was filmed in a document warehouse belonging to the headquarters of the Canadian television network Knowledge. An office in the same building was also used for Scully's briefing at the beginning of the episode. The scenes involving the Smoking Man required special permission to film, to allow actor Davis to smoke in a public building.

All of the interior shots of FBI headquarters were filmed in the main newsroom of the Canadian Broadcasting Corporation, as the production crew found that the open plan offices they wished to represent no longer existed, having typically been converted into cubicles. However, it was found that working around the CBC's broadcast schedule was too unwieldy, and later episodes of the series replicated the location on a soundstage.

The forest scenes were shot on location in Lynn Valley, in the Lower Seymour Conservation Reserve—formerly known as the Seymour Demonstration Forest. The crew spent $9,000 building wooden pathways for equipment, cast, and crew to move easily through the area. Additional scenes were filmed at BC Hydro headquarters, whilst Scully's apartment was represented by a location used only in this episode and the third episode, "Squeeze"—use of this location was discontinued once it became apparent that most reverse angles would show a large parking lot across the street.

Make-up effects artist Toby Lindala was tasked with creating a prop which would allow actress Sarah Koskoff to simulate a nosebleed on-camera, rather than using off-screen make-up and editing tricks. However, during test shots, the prop's tubing burst, causing the stage blood to begin dripping down Koskoff's forehead, rather than from her nose. Anderson has expressed displeasure with the scene in which Scully visits Mulder in his motel room in her underwear to have him examine a suspicious wound, which turns out to be insect bites. The actress felt that the scene was too gratuitous, saying, "There really wasn't a reason for it. The bites could have been on my shoulder or something." However, Carter has explained that the scene was simply intended to highlight the platonic relationship between the two lead roles.

=== Post-production ===
Post-production work on the episode was completed by May 1993, with the final version assembled only three hours before its preview screening for Fox executives. Stock footage of the exterior of the FBI headquarters was added to the episode, though later episodes would film new exterior shots using Simon Fraser University as a stand-in location. The climactic abduction scene featuring Billy Miles in a forest clearing featured a swirling vortex of leaves created using computer imagery by the series's visual designer Mat Beck, which Carter has described as more complicated to achieve than the Normandy landings.

=== Deleted scenes ===
The original script gives more insight into Scully's visit to Blevins' office. The scene that introduces her in the script is set just before her visit and takes place at the FBI Academy in Quantico, Virginia, where she teaches a small group of trainees about the physiology of homicide, specifically electrocution and death by cattle prod. Her attention is distracted by an agent who enters the room and hands her a note that reads, "Your attendance is required in Washington at 1600 hrs. sharp." Scully checks her digital watch, which reads 1:03. The majority, at the least, of this scene was actually filmed but the scene was omitted from the final version of the episode.

The next scene is that in which Scully reports to the receptionist at FBI headquarters; the script includes Scully showing her badge to the receptionist and dialogue for the role of the receptionist as she tells Scully, "See Section Chief Blevins. Third floor, violent crime division." In the final version of the episode, Scully's badge does not appear in any scenes, and the receptionist does not speak.

Two filmed scenes were cut from the final version of the episode. Both featured Tim Ransom as Scully's boyfriend, Ethan Minette. In the first, Minette and Scully meet, with Scully cancelling the vacation plans they had arranged because of her assignment to the Bellefleur case. The second scene briefly shows Scully answering a telephone call from Mulder whilst asleep in bed with Minette, though the latter has no dialogue. The addition of Scully's boyfriend was an attempt by Fox executives to create the romantic interest they felt was missing between Mulder and Scully. Carter ultimately found that it was "very easy" to remove the character from the episode, both because his appearances seemed to slow down the scenes in which Mulder and Scully are together and due to the fact that Carter found Scully's relationship with her FBI partner to actually be more interesting and exciting than her relationship with her boyfriend.

== Broadcast and reception ==
"Pilot" premiered on Fox on September 10, 1993. The episode earned a Nielsen household rating of 7.9, with a 15 share, meaning that roughly 7.9 percent of all television-equipped households and 15 percent of households watching television tuned in for the episode. It was viewed by 7.4 million households and 12.0 million viewers.

The episode was well-received by several of the series' future crew members. Producer and writer Glen Morgan felt that the episode's "merging of Silence of the Lambs and Close Encounters of the Third Kind" was impressive; he also felt it was the only truly scary series on television at the time. Writer Howard Gordon stated that "the pilot set the tone of the show really successfully," noting the difficulty inherent in introducing both a series' premise and its main cast in "forty-eight minutes" and finding that the episode had achieved both, being "a tremendous synthesis of all the parts." Carter also recounted that the episode's test screening for Rupert Murdoch and other Fox executives was met with "spontaneous applause."

"On-screen chemistry is a difficult thing to achieve, but Duchovny and Anderson have it in spades. From the moment they first meet, it's as though they have always been a duo"

— Den of Geek's Matt Haigh on "Pilot"

The episode was generally well received by fans and critics alike. Variety magazine criticized the episode for "using reworked concepts" but praised the production and noted its potential. Of the acting, Variety stated, "Duchovny's delineation of a serious scientist with a sense of humor should win him partisans, and Anderson's wavering doubter connects well. They're a solid team...." Variety also praised the writing and direction: "Mandel's cool direction of Carter's ingenious script and the artful presentation itself give TV sci-fi a boost." The magazine concluded, "Carter's dialogue is fresh without being self-conscious, and the characters are involving. The series kicks off with drive and imagination, both innovative in recent TV." Entertainment Weekly noted that Scully "was set up as a scoffing skeptic" in the pilot but progressed toward belief throughout the first season. After the airing of just four episodes, the magazine called The X-Files "the most paranoid, subversive show on TV," noting the "marvelous tension between Anderson—who is dubious about these events—and Duchovny, who has the haunted, imploring look of a true believer." Keith Phipps, writing for The A.V. Club, praised the episode, rating it an A−. He felt that the episode's premise worked well to "set a template" for future episodes, and noted that the chemistry between Duchovny and Anderson was "already there" from the outset. Matt Haigh, writing for Den of Geek, reviewed the episode positively, praising the chemistry between the lead roles and the script's quality. In 2012, SFX named it the tenth best TV pilot in the science fiction and fantasy genre, saying it "brought us everything we came to expect from the show."

The plot for "Pilot" was also adapted into a young adult novel in 1995 by Les Martin, under the title X Marks the Spot.
