= Chautauqua Girl =

- Genre: Drama
- Written by: Jeannine Locke
- Directed by: Robert Iscove
- Starring: Janet-Laine Green; Terence Kelly; Jackie Burroughs
- Country of origin: Canada
- Original language: English

Production
- Producer: Jeannine Locke
- Cinematography: Vic Sarin
- Running time: 90 minutes
- Production company: Canadian Broadcasting Corporation

Original release
- Network: CBC Television
- Release: January 8, 1984

Chautauqua Girl is a Canadian romantic drama television film, which was broadcast by CBC Television in 1984. Written by Jeannine Locke and directed by Robert Iscove, the film is set in 1921 and stars Janet-Laine Green as Sally Driscoll, a woman who is touring Western Canada as a representative of the travelling Chautauqua organization; arriving in the small town of Fairville, Alberta, she finds the town unprepared for the upcoming event but meets and falls in love with Neil McCallum (Terence Kelly), a widowed farmer who is running as a United Farmers of Alberta candidate in the imminent 1921 Alberta general election.

The cast also includes Jackie Burroughs as Mrs. Ferguson, a pioneer woman in the community whose hard life has made her much older in appearance and spirit than her actual age.

The film was shot in Alberta, primarily around Blackie and at Heritage Park Historical Village in Calgary. It was broadcast by CBC Television on January 8, 1984.

== Response ==
The film was positively reviewed by critics.

Rick Groen of The Globe and Mail called it a thinly-plotted but charming film, writing that "in a film built on atmosphere, perhaps the principal architects are director Rob Iscove and cinematographer Vic Sarin. Sarin's work is nothing short of superb, so vivid that it even survives the compression onto the small screen. In his adroit hands, amber waves of grain go far beyond the visually cliched. From close-up to long-shot, the sight consistently echoes the sense - the pinched and burnished faces of men tied too closely to the land, the nocturnal lamp of the community hall the only reprieve in a sea of blackness. And when the Chautauqua - another light in another darkness - finally arrives, it's Iscove who really goes to town, artfully weaving the touring performers into the ongoing performance, the show into the show. Again, the co-operative theme is reinforced, and apparent isolation becomes total integration. Total indeed, for in the end the viewer himself is emotionally drawn in, swept back by television to a time before television, before the mixed blessing of the mass media turned that shining beacon into a blinding glare."

Mike Boone of the Montreal Gazette praised the performances of Green, Kelly and Burroughs, writing that "the romance of Chautauqua Girl will doubtless set hearts to fluttering in television land, but the film is infinitely richer and more complex than your standard boy-meets-girl romantic fluff". He concluded that "the CBC drama department bombed earlier this season with the dreadful Vanderburg miniseries. Chautauqua Girl puts the network back on course toward offering viewers quality drama that is distinctively Canadian in style and theme. We can all be proud of what our national network has done here. Chautauqua Girl should not be missed."

The film won the ACTRA Award for Best Television Program at the 14th ACTRA Awards in 1985. Green was also nominated for Best Television Actress, and Locke was nominated for Best Television Drama Writing.
