= Deep Throat (The X-Files episode) =

- The X-Files episode
- Fox Mulder under a UFO. The scenes were later described by Chris Carter as featuring the "worst effects we've ever done" on The X-Files.
- Episode no.: Season 1 Episode 2
- Directed by: Daniel Sackheim
- Written by: Chris Carter
- Production code: 1X01
- Original air date: September 17, 1993
- Running time: 45 minutes

Guest appearances
- Jerry Hardin as Deep Throat; Michael Bryan French as Paul Mossinger; Seth Green as Emil; Gabrielle Rose as Anita Budahas; Monica Parker as Ladonna; Andrew Johnston as Colonel Robert Budahas

Episode chronology
← Previous "Pilot"	Next → "Squeeze"
- The X-Files season 1

"Deep Throat" is the second episode of the first season of the American science fiction television series The X-Files. The episode premiered on the Fox network on September 17, 1993. Written by series creator Chris Carter and directed by Daniel Sackheim, the episode introduces several elements which became staples of the series' mythology.

In this television series, FBI agents Fox Mulder (David Duchovny) and Dana Scully (Gillian Anderson) investigate cases linked to the paranormal, called X-Files. Mulder believes in paranormal phenomena, while the skeptical Scully attempts to discredit them. In this episode, the pair investigate a possible conspiracy in the United States Air Force, and Mulder meets a mysterious informant who warns him to stay away from the case. Undeterred, Mulder continues and comes closer to the truth about extraterrestrial life than ever before, only to have his progress stalled and findings taken from him, yet again.

The episode introduces the character of Deep Throat, played by Jerry Hardin, who serves as Mulder's informant in the first season. The character was inspired by the historical Deep Throat and serves to bridge the gap between the protagonists and the conspirators they would investigate. The episode itself focuses on common elements of ufology, in a setting reminiscent of Area 51 and Nellis Air Force Base. It contains several special effects that Carter later described as "good, given the [series'] restrictions"; although he singled out the scenes featuring blinking lights as being poorly executed. In its initial U.S. broadcast, "Deep Throat" was viewed by approximately 6.9 million households and 11.1 million viewers and attracted positive reviews from critics.

== Plot ==
In southwestern Idaho, near Ellens Air Force Base, military police raid the home of Colonel Robert Budahas, who has barricaded himself inside after stealing a military vehicle. The authorities find Budahas trembling and covered in rashes.

Four months later, FBI agents Fox Mulder (David Duchovny) and Dana Scully (Gillian Anderson) meet at a Washington bar to discuss the case. Mulder explains that Budahas, a test pilot, has not been seen since the raid and the military will not comment on his condition; the FBI has refused to investigate. Mulder claims that six other pilots are missing at the base, which is subject to rumors about experimental aircraft. While using the bar's restroom, Mulder is approached by a mysterious informant named "Deep Throat" (Jerry Hardin), who cautions him to avoid the case. He claims that Mulder is under surveillance, which later proves to be true.

Mulder and Scully travel to Idaho and meet with Budahas' wife, Anita, who claims her husband exhibited erratic behavior before his disappearance. She tells them about a neighbor–whom the agents visit–whose husband is also a test pilot who has been behaving oddly. Scully makes an appointment with the base's director, Colonel Kissell, but he refuses to talk when they visit his home. They are subsequently approached by Paul Mossinger, who identifies himself as a local reporter and refers them to a local UFO-themed diner; there, they discuss UFOs with the owner, who believes she has witnessed several nearby.

Visiting the base that night, the agents witness a mysterious aircraft performing seemingly impossible maneuvers in the sky. They flee when a black helicopter approaches, seemingly in pursuit of Emil and Zoe, a trespassing teenage couple. As Mulder treats Emil and Zoe to a meal at the diner, they tell the agents about the lights and how they believe the UFOs are launched from another nearby base. Meanwhile, Budahas is returned to his home with no memory of what happened. After leaving the diner, Mulder and Scully are confronted by black-suited agents, who destroy the photographs they have taken and order them to leave town.

An indignant Mulder sneaks onto the base with help from Emil and Zoe. He sees a triangular craft fly overhead and then is captured by soldiers who tamper with his memory. Meanwhile, Scully re-encounters Mossinger, whom she discovers is actually a security operative for the base. At gunpoint, she forces him to guide her to the base and exchanges him for Mulder. Having been denied the truth about the base, Mulder and Scully return to Washington. Days later, Mulder encounters Deep Throat while jogging at a local track. Mulder asks if "they" really are present on Earth; Deep Throat responds that "they have been here for a long, long time."

== Production ==
=== Conception and pre-production ===
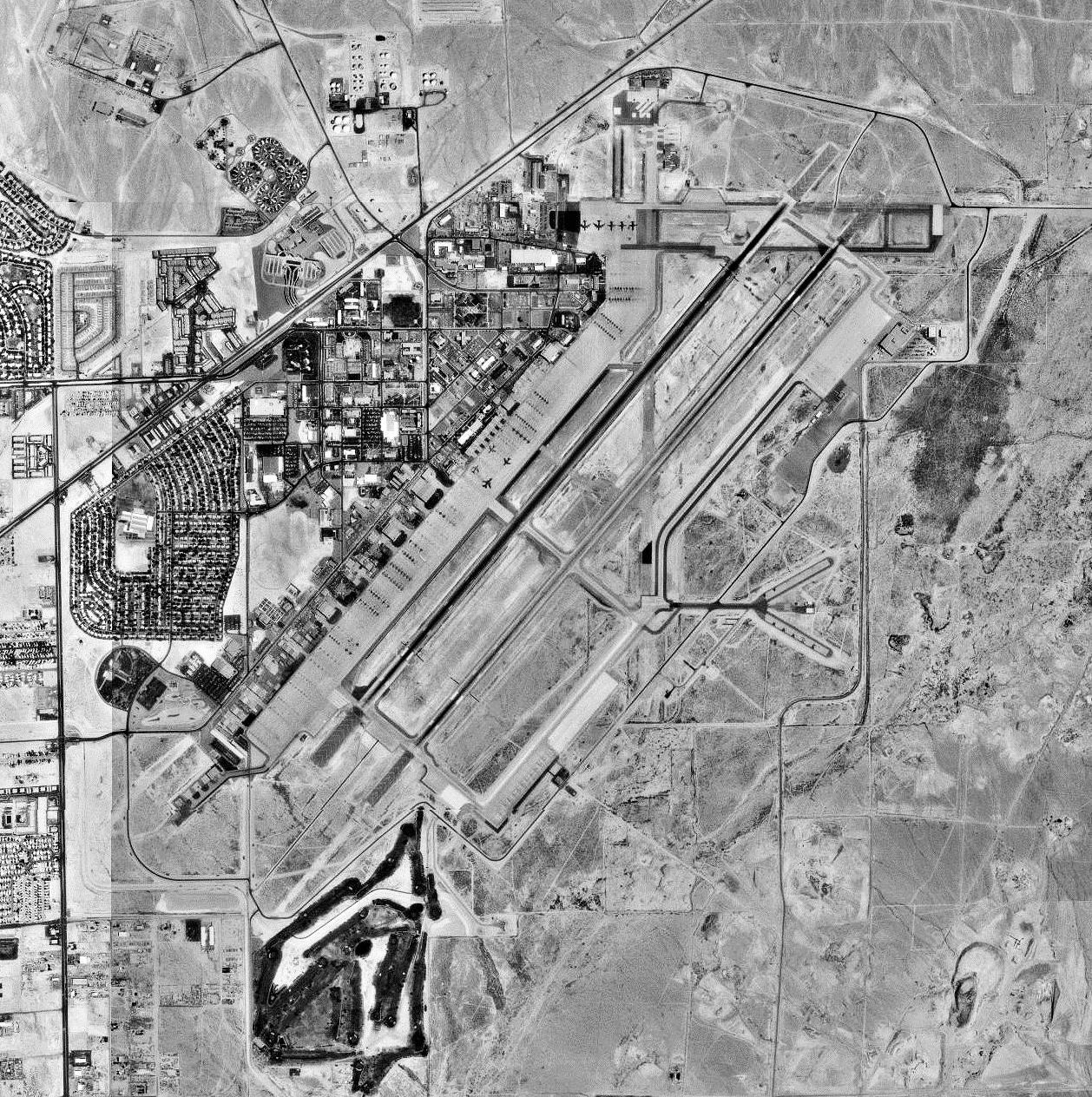
The episode's Ellens Air Force Base was inspired by the real Nellis Air Force Base.

This episode marked Hardin's first appearance as Deep Throat. Series creator Chris Carter said the character was inspired by the historical Deep Throat, an informant who leaked information about the FBI's investigation into the Watergate scandal to journalists Bob Woodward and Carl Bernstein. Also cited as an influence was X, the character portrayed by Donald Sutherland in the Oliver Stone film JFK (1991). Carter created the character to bridge the gap between Mulder and Scully and the shadowy conspirators working against them; describing Deep Throat as a man "who works in some level of government that we have no idea exists." Carter was drawn to Hardin after seeing him in The Firm (1993), and described the casting as an "easy choice." Hardin flew to Vancouver every few weeks to film his scenes. Carter called Hardin's portrayal "very, very good."

According to Carter, it was evident that The X-Files was a "series in making" during this episode. The main inspiration of the episode was ufology. Believers in aliens have long thought that Area 51 and Nellis Air Force Base, both located in Nevada, have alien technology captured during the Roswell UFO incident of 1947. The name Ellens Air Force Base was derived from the name of Carter's college girlfriend, whose last name was Ellens. The surname for the two guest characters, Budahas, came from a high school friend of Carter. The story's military project was inspired by a rumor that the United States Air Force had developed an experimental aircraft dubbed Aurora. Carter said he remembered people talking about this rumor and that its inclusion in the story was a reference to it. Duchovny and Anderson had never used a gun or held one before, so they were trained on how to hold them properly.

=== Filming ===
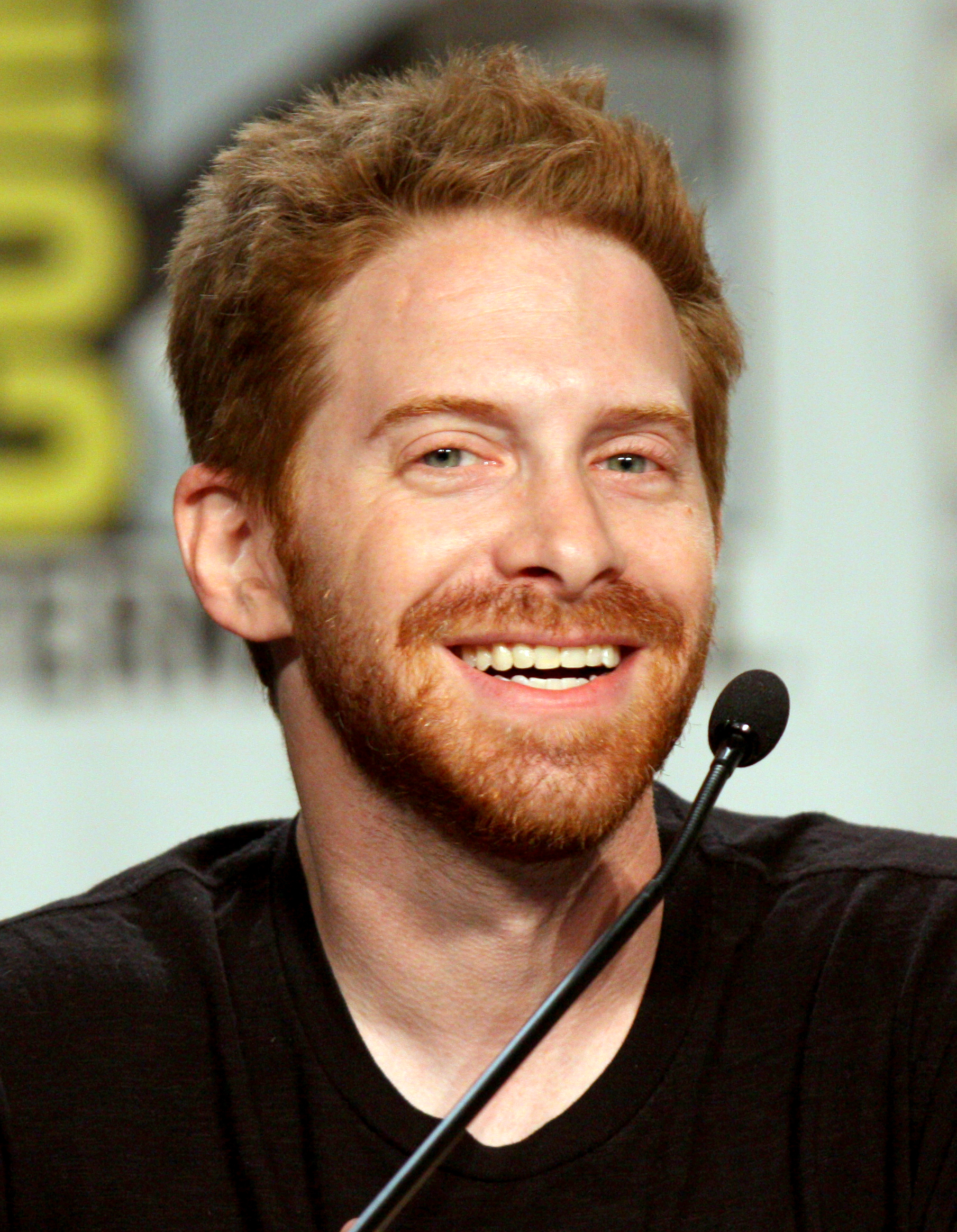
Seth Green (pictured in 2011) was cast as "stoner kid" Emil, and spent production "goofing off" with star David Duchovny.

The scenes in which Mulder infiltrates the secret base were shot at a real U.S. airbase. With a small budget and television schedule, Carter said the effects seemed "good, given the restrictions" they faced. The UFO was digitally constructed, based around what visual effects supervisor Mat Beck described as a "sort of disco light rig" that was rented from a "party supplier." Towards the end of filming the night-time scenes, the sun was beginning to rise, forcing crew member John Bartley to rig the angles to keep the scenes as dark as possible. One scene, in which Mulder infiltrates the base, had already been rewritten to change its daytime setting to night; the rising sun forced the scene to be filmed as originally conceived.

The house used for the exterior shots of the Budahas residence was reused in Carter's next series, Millennium, as the home of protagonist Frank Black. The house's owner was a flight attendant who frequently met cast and crew members as they traveled in and out of Vancouver. The initial scene with Duchovny and Anderson in the bar was shot at a Vancouver restaurant called The Meat Market, which according to Carter was a much "divier location than the production designers would have you believe." The Meat Market was the only bar the crew could find that had not been renovated in the wake of Expo 86 and retained a "well-travelled" feel. It later appeared in the third season episode "Piper Maru." The roadside diner used for interior shots of the "Flying Saucer Diner" was remote enough from the other filming locations that a bus was made available to transport crew members, to save on travel expenses. Only key grip Al Campbell made use of this bus service, causing producers to abandon the idea until the fourth season episode "Herrenvolk."

Guest star Seth Green said that despite being cast as "stoner kid" Emil, and having "cornered the market on the affable stoner in TV and film," he had never used cannabis before. Green related that his first day on the set came just after Duchovny had finished filming his final scene; Green was impressed with Duchovny's demeanour and improvisational acting, and added that the two "just goofed off the whole time."

=== Post-production ===
The scene in which Scully is sitting at her computer writing in her journal [...] came down as an edict because [Fox] wanted a summing up of the episode, and in the end, I think it made the episode better. That motif of Scully doing a voice-over as she types became a running story crutch for us when we needed to reinstruct the audience about where we are going, or where we had been.

— Carter on the episode's voiceover ending

Carter claimed that the scenes with the flashing lights in the sky were the "worst effects we've ever done," given limits on money and time; he also commented that digital-based special effects were still in their infancy. Beck was the special effects producer and supervisor during season one; he and Carter unsuccessfully tried to make the special effects look three dimensional and "better." According to Carter, the result looked like a "kind of hi-tech Pong game."

This episode marks Mark Snow's debut as a solo composer for the series. Carter stated he and the production crew were "fearful" of using too much music in the episode, and the first season as a whole. Anderson's voiceover narration towards the end of the episode was inserted after complaints from Fox executives, who desired more closure. The executives felt that viewers were not supposed to be "confused" after watching and must have at least a slight idea of what was going on. The voiceovers became a common technique for the remainder of the series.

== Themes ==
Mossinger's warning to Mulder that some truths should be kept hidden from the public has been cited by scholars as representing the difficulty of forcing large organizations to take responsibility for wrongdoing. The episode's final revelation, that aliens have been on Earth "for a long, long time," has been cited as following a trend of post-futurism established by science fiction cinema in the 1980s. This trend has replaced traditional science fiction topics such as space exploration with themes inspired by the Watergate scandal and the spread of conspiracy theories.

== Broadcast and reception ==
"Deep Throat" premiered on Fox on September 17, 1993. The episode's initial U.S. broadcast was viewed by approximately 6.9 million households and 11.1 million viewers. It earned a Nielsen rating of 7.3, with a 14 share, meaning that roughly 7.3 percent of all television-equipped households, and 14 percent of households watching television, were tuned in to the episode. The episode was released on VHS in 1996, alongside "Pilot"; as well being released on DVD as part of the complete first season. It was later included on The X-Files Mythology, Volume 1 – Abduction, a DVD collection containing episodes centered on the series' mythology.

In a first season retrospective in Entertainment Weekly, the episode was rated a B+, with praise for Hardin's "world-weary" performance, though the review noted that the "querulous, ominous tone" of the episode was "a little awkward, but full of promise of things to come." Adrienne Martini of the Austin Chronicle called the episode "fun to watch", describing it as "great TV"; while the San Jose Mercury News called the title character "the most interesting new character on television," also calling the episode "strange but marvellous." The Toronto Star's Mike Antonucci wrote that the episode demonstrates that Carter "can blend subtle, complicated elements with heart-pounding action," adding that "Nothing is obvious about The X-Files, in fact, except its quality." Michael Janusonis of The Beaver County Times was more critical, calling it "an acquired taste" and noting that it "sort of diddled out in the end," lacking "a completely satisfactory resolution."

Writing for The A.V. Club, Keith Phipps rated the episode an A−, finding it "almost like an extension of the pilot." Phipps felt the scene featuring Mulder's kidnapping to be "one of the scariest moments from the series' early days, as much for what it suggests as for what it shows." Writing for website Den of Geek, Matt Haigh reviewed the episode positively, praising its decision not to answer all the questions it asks. Haigh noted that "the fact that we are left as clueless about what really happened as Mulder and Scully only enhances the viewing experience," finding such mystery to be "a rare thing indeed" on network television. Robert Shearman, in his book Wanting to Believe: A Critical Guide to The X-Files, Millennium & The Lone Gunmen, rated the episode five stars out of five, finding it to be "much more confident in its pacing and tone" than the previous episode. Shearman felt that the episode was "a skillfully scripted story of cover-up and paranoia," and noted that "it sets up the overall themes of the show so well, it almost seems like a primer."

"Deep Throat" was cited as beginning to "set the stage for the central conflicts" of the series. IGN's Dan Iverson felt that the episode served to "open the door to the possibilities of this series"; while Tor.com's Meghan Deans noted that "although the pilot introduced the idea of government conspiracy, it's 'Deep Throat' that kicks out the edges of the canvas." The introduction of Hardin as Deep Throat in the episode was listed by Entertainment Weekly as number 37 on its list of "The 100 Greatest Television Moments" of the 1990s.
