= Swarmed =

2005 Canadian television film

- Official poster
- Written by: Miguel Tejada-Flores
- Directed by: Paul Ziller
- Starring: Michael Shanks; Carol Alt; Richard Chevolleau; Booth Savage; Christopher Bondy; Tim Thomerson
- Music by: James Gelfand
- Country of origin: Canada
- Original language: English

Production
- Producers: Neil Bregman; Stefan Wodoslawsky
- Cinematography: Robert Saad
- Editor: Robert Newton
- Production company: Reel One Entertainment

Original release
- Network: Sci Fi Channel
- Release: April 6, 2005

Swarmed is a 2005 Canadian film directed by Paul Ziller and starring Michael Shanks as a scientist trying to save a town from yellow jacket wasps. The film was made for television by Sci Fi Pictures. It first aired on April 6, 2005.

== Plot ==
Kent Horvath is a scientist, trying to invent a new pesticide, specifically for yellow jacket wasps. He tests its effectiveness out on eight yellow jackets, finding that it successfully kills six, but the two who survived now have extremely high pheromone levels, resulting in increased aggression. That night, the janitor accidentally releases them, and they both attack, killing him. They find his body the next morning, along with one of the wasps, with the other one nowhere to be found.

His body is taken to the morgue, where the mortician hears a buzzing from the janitor's mouth, and opens it, freeing the second wasp that had somehow trapped itself. It then proceeds to sting him until he is dead before flying away. Meanwhile, Cristina Brown, an entomologist, teaches a class about bees. One young man relates to her a story about how he was once stung by a wasp, and suddenly six or seven others attacked him. She explains that when an insect attacks, it releases an attack pheromone, signalling all the others of their kind that there is an immediate threat in the area. The class is cut short when she is called in about the dead mortician. Agent Doug Heydon, tells her about the dead janitor and Kent's research, prompting her to investigate the possibility of a link between the two deaths.

Meanwhile, Kent's exterminator friend, Q is called by a family with a yellow jacket infestation. He finds himself low on pesticide and goes to Kent to restock. Kent warns him not to use any of the experimental pesticide, but a curious Q mixes it with the regular solution. As he sprays the nest, the analysis of the hyper-aggressive wasp's venom completes. Kent learns in shock that pesticide caused a genetic mutation in the wasp's chemical structure, resulting in incredibly potent venom along with the hyper-aggression.

In the meantime, the Chief of Police blackmails Mayor Gibson with evidence that he has been making covert meetings with Phineas Washburn, the owner of Washburn's Tasty Sauce. He makes it known that Washburn made a large financial contribution to Gibson's reelection campaign, giving him large sway in many political matters. The Chief very openly suggests' to Gibson that he will reveal this information to the public if he doesn't get a payoff. He leaves with Gibson furious.

At his workshop, Q puts the sprayed nest in his trash compactor, but about one quarter of the nest survives, including the queen. They chase Q to his truck, where he manages to administer antivenom before passing out. The wasps then leave and begin sending off attack pheromones, which not only attract multiple other swarms, but also mutate them to have extremely potent venom similar to the sprayed swarm. Meanwhile, Cristina and Kent go to the home of a man who was stung to death by the swarm after they were attracted to the raw meat patties on his grill. They find a dead wasp on his clothes and take it back to the lab for analysis. Meanwhile, Q is awoken by Rafe, the teenager he's watching for the summer, where they agree to hunt down the remaining portion of the swarm themselves.

Back at the lab, the venom results show that the lethality is identical to the strength of the wasp that killed the janitor. After informing Agent Heydon, they all agree that the annual burger cook-off will attract the swarm directly to the populace. The single wasp that first killed the janitor finds its way to Mayor Gibson's office, and kills him by stinging his eye. His assistant, Ellie Martin, finds his body and chases the wasp with a double-barreled shotgun, eventually killing it.

Meanwhile, Heydon goes to warn the Chief, as they attempt to tell Washburn that they have to cancel the cook-off. However, neither party believes them, rather threatening them with legal action if they dare interfere with the cook-off. Just after Heydon leaves the Chief, the wasps are attracted to his rare steak and kill him when he tries to fight back. Eventually, Q and Rafe use a pheromone detector to track down the part of the swarm that stayed behind to finish off the steak. Q uses a flamethrower to kill the swarm but melts part of his van in the process.

The cook-off finally starts, and Heydon comes to try to convince Washburn that they have to shut it down. But before he can, the swarm arrives and begin to attack the crowd, including killing a sadistic reporter, Melanie Sheer, while her cameraman, Chuey, safely video tapes in a phone booth. Washburn attempts to hide in a dunk tank, but two wasps kill him when they crawl down the hose he is breathing through and sting his mouth. Eventually, Kent and Cristina arrive and begin administering antivenom to the stung, using tire patching spray to close up the wasps' breathing holes. Q also arrives and begins attracting the wasps to a golf cart, in hopes of trapping them inside a garage. While he does so, Kent, Cristina, and Rafe begin gathering petrol tanks and gasoline, so as to destroy the swarm once they get it trapped. Q manages to get the wasps inside, and they ignite the gas with Rafe's lighter. However, after fire kills the wasps and destroys the garage, the queen manages to escape the inferno and makes a run for Q, but is sucked up by Rafe with the portable vacuum cleaner he was given to clean up any wasp carcases; he throws it into the fire.

Kent and Cristina start dating and go to dinner. Meanwhile, it is revealed that the queen, still trapped in the melted vacuum, survived the blaze and is in the process of laying eggs.

== Cast ==
- Michael Shanks as Kent Horvath
- Carol Alt as Cristina Brown
- Richard Chevolleau as Q
- Booth Savage as Agent Doug Heydon
- Christopher Bondy as Mayor Gibson
- Jonathan Malen as Rafe
- Maria Brooks as Melanie Sheer
- Tim Thomerson as Phineas Washburn
- Balazs Koos as Chuey
- David Eisner as David Orsow
- Samantha Weinstein as Cindy Orsow

== Production ==
Swarmed was filmed in Dundas, Ontario, Canada, and was distributed by Sci Fi Pictures.

== Reception ==
The film received mostly negative reviews from critics, with a 19% rating, on Rotten Tomatoes.

== See also ==
- Murder Hornet
- Killer Bee
- List of Wasp Films
- Die Bienen – Tödliche Bedrohung (a 2008 Killer Bee movie)
