= Alden Diehl =

Alden Edgar Diehl (June 10, 1931 – October 26, 2000) was a Canadian radio executive and comedian. He was a shortlisted finalist for the Juno Award for Comedy Album of the Year at the Juno Awards of 1979 for his comedy single "Fight On".

Born in Cypress River, Manitoba, he was the brother of Canadian Broadcasting Corporation radio actor and producer Fred Diehl. He began working in radio in 1951 with a job as assistant librarian at CJCA in Edmonton, Alberta. He later worked in management roles for stations such as CKLW in Windsor, Ontario, CFRA in Ottawa, Ontario, CFOX-FM in Vancouver, British Columbia, and CITI-FM in Winnipeg, Manitoba.

"Fight On", an ode to Manitoba's struggles with extreme weather, was released as a single, with the better known winter version as its A-side and an alternate version about the province's summer weather on the B-side. In addition to "Fight On", Diehl also performed as a tenor soloist with church choirs, and in musical theatre roles.

He retired from radio broadcasting in 1995, and died in 2000 in Ladner, British Columbia. He was posthumously inducted into the Canadian Association of Broadcasters Hall of Fame in 2001.
