= The Diamond Fleece =

- Russian DVD cover
- Also known as: The Great Diamond Robbery
- Genre: Comedy; Crime
- Written by: Michael Norell
- Directed by: Al Waxman
- Starring: Ben Cross; Kate Nelligan; Brian Dennehy; Tom Butler; Janet-Laine Green; Ron Lea
- Music by: James McVay
- Country of origin: Canada
- Original language: English

Production
- Executive producer: Howard Lipstone
- Producers: Stewart Harding; John Danylkiw
- Production location: Toronto
- Cinematography: François Protat
- Editor: Murray Wren
- Running time: 93 minutes
- Production company: Moving Image Productions

Original release
- Release: June 17, 1992

The Diamond Fleece is a 1992 Canadian made-for-television film directed by Al Waxman and starring Ben Cross, Kate Nelligan and Brian Dennehy. The film earned Kate Nelligan the 1993 Gemini Award for Best Performance by an Actress in a Leading Role in a Dramatic Program or Mini-Series.

== Cast ==
- Ben Cross as Rick Dunne / Alex Breuer
- Tom Butler as Gordon Pritchard
- Kate Nelligan as Holly
- Brian Dennehy as Outlaw
- Janet-Laine Green as Ms. Green
- Tony Rosato as Cliff Vahrenhorst
- Ron Lea as Matrisciana
- David Huband as Cheston
- Jonathan Welsh as Littlefield
