= Fred Diehl =

Canadian actor and writer

Frederick Murray Diehl (October 6, 1921 – November 15, 2008) was a Canadian radio and television actor and writer, most noted as the recipient of the John Drainie Award for lifetime achievement in Canadian broadcasting at the 14th ACTRA Awards in 1985.

He was born in Cypress River, Manitoba, and was the brother of broadcaster Alden Diehl. He began his career as an announcer for CBC Radio's CBX in Edmonton, Alberta in 1948, before moving to Toronto in the 1950s, where he was a writer for the variety television series Holiday Ranch, and a performer in various CBC drama anthology series, including a supporting role in the pilot episode of Wojeck.

In 1966, he joined CBR in Calgary as a producer of radio documentaries, In 1970, he was producer of a radio adaptation of W.O. Mitchell's Jake and the Kid. In the 1980s, he was a producer of radio dramas for CBC Radio, including the series Nightfall and Sunday Matinee, and won an ACTRA Award for The Panther and the Jaguar at the 13th ACTRA Awards in 1984.
