= Christmas Comes to Willow Creek =

1987 television film directed by Richard Lang

- DVD cover for the film
- Genre: Family; Drama
- Written by: Michael Norell; Andy Siegel
- Directed by: Richard Lang
- Starring: John Schneider; Tom Wopat; Kim Delaney; Zachary Ansley
- Music by: Charles Fox
- Countries of origin: United States; United Kingdom
- Original language: English

Production
- Producer: Blue André
- Production locations: Dawson, Yukon; Vancouver
- Cinematography: Brenton Spencer
- Editor: Gerald Shepard
- Running time: 94 minutes
- Production company: ITC Entertainment

Original release
- Network: CBS
- Release: December 20, 1987

Christmas Comes to Willow Creek is a 1987 American made-for-television drama film directed by Richard Lang and produced by Billie André and Blue André, with the screenplay written by Michael Norell and Andy Siegel.

The film stars John Schneider and Tom Wopat (reunited from The Dukes of Hazzard, and one of the few projects in which the pair didn't play the Duke cousins), with Kim Delaney, Zachary Ansley, Joy Coghill and Hoyt Axton. Music for the film includes songs written and recorded by Billy Milo.

Scenes set in Willow Creek were filmed in Dawson City, Yukon, with the Palace Grand Theatre's exterior representing the general store.

== Plot ==
Willow Creek, Alaska is going through problems because the town's main business, a cannery, has closed and many residents no longer have jobs. Ray and Pete are brothers; although they share the same profession (truck drivers), they are different as day and night.

Pete (played by Tom Wopat) is trying to figure out what to do with his rebellious son Michael (played by Zachary Ansley), who is angry that his father is always on the road trucking; meantime, he also has to deal with Ray (played by John Schneider), a troublesome recluse who has problems of his own, including a pregnant wife, who had left Pete for Ray in the first place.

Ray and Pete are hired by an old friend, Al Bensinger (played by Hoyt Axton), to bring Christmas presents and a very big surprise from California all the way up to his home town of Willow Creek, Alaska. The brothers do not realize that they will have to rely on one another and along the way, the brothers and Pete's son argue and get stuck in a blizzard; meanwhile Ray's wife goes into labor. As she gives birth, they finally reconcile with each other, and arrive at their destination greeted by a crowd of happy townspeople. Earlier in the film, it is discovered that Ray was a champion chili cooker, and the surprise is that Al has loaded the truck with enough supplies to reopen the cannery and manufacture chili. Ray and his wife like the small town and decide to stay and help the cannery get working again. Pete informs his son that Al has made him a partner in their company, so he won't have to drive a truck anymore and they can be closer from here on out.

== Cast ==
- John Schneider - Ray
- Tom Wopat - Pete
- Kim Delaney - Jessie
- Zachary Ansley - Michael
- Joy Coghill - Charlotte
- Hoyt Axton - Al Bensinger
- Brian MacDonald - Dwayne
- Dwight Koss - Mayor Newman
- Barbara Russell - Edna Mae
- Ted Stidder - Doc
- Robert Forsythe - Chief Cobb
- Charissa Reeves - Sabrina
- Geordie Needham - Thurgood
- Robin Mossley - Cecil

== See also ==
- List of Christmas films
