= List of Jacob Two-Two (TV series) episodes =

This is a list of episodes of the Canadian animated series Jacob Two-Two.

== Series overview ==
Season	Episodes	Originally released	
Season	Episodes	First released	Last released
1	13	September 7, 2003	November 30, 2003
2	13	February 22, 2004	June 22, 2004
3	13	October 7, 2004	January 30, 2005
4	13	February 3, 2005	January 16, 2006
5	10	September 20, 2005	May 19, 2006

== Season 1 (2003) ==
No. overall	No. in season	Title	Original release date
1	1	"Jacob Two Two vs. the Hooded Fang"	September 7, 2003
After Jacob moves to Montreal, his Dad takes him, Noah and Emma to a wrestling match where Jacob unknowingly bumps into the Hooded Fang, a famous wrestler.
2	2	"Jacob Two Two and the Staff Room of Doom"	September 14, 2003
With a desire to look "cool" on his first day at a new school, Jacob borrows his brother's favourite skull t-shirt to wear at school, but the shirt is confiscated by Principal Greedyguts as a violation of the school's dress code, and is placed inside the school's vault.
3	3	"Jacob Two Two and the Purloined Hockey Card"	September 21, 2003
Jacob's poorly performing hockey team improves significantly under the influence of a Gummer Gormley hockey card he received from his father as a good luck charm. However, this luck ends when school janitor Leo Louse steals it from Jacob's locker.
4	4	"Jacob Two Two and the Conniving Caterer"	September 28, 2003
Principal Greedyguts replaces the school's lunch lady with Leo Louse in a move to make more money for himself. Jacob investigates the plot with the help of his neighbour, X. Barnaby Dinglebat, a master spy.
5	5	"Jacob Two Two and the Daily Crown"	October 5, 2003
Jacob and Buford investigate the sudden popularity of a new newspaper, The Daily Crown, the product of a mind control plot by Carl Fester King using chemicals in the paper's ink (ingested by unsuspecting readers licking it off their hands).
6	6	"Jacob Two Two and the Mystery of the Malty McGuffin"	October 12, 2003
Jacob and his friends hunt for a 40-year-old treasure dictated by an old library book.
7	7	"Jacob Two Two and the Unlickable Cowlick"	October 19, 2003
Jacob's hair has a bad cowlick on his school's picture day.
8	8	"Jacob Two Two and Scholars for Dollars"	October 25, 2003
Jacob cheats the system on a pop quiz in his geography class, but is eventually selected as a geography expert for Dreary Meadows' team in a nationally televised quiz bowl.
9	9	"Jacob Two Two and the Colossal Candy Challenge"	November 2, 2003
After Dreary Meadows' gymnasium is given a failing grade by the system's Superintendent, Jacob and his friends try extra hard to raise money in a chocolate fundraiser to bring it up to code.
10	10	"Jacob Two Two and the Big Bagel Bungle"	November 9, 2003
Jacob is given the task of fetching bagels for his dad's Sunday brunch, however the relatively simple task is complicated by various occurrences.
11	11	"Jacob Two Two and the Notorious Knit Knapper"	November 16, 2003
Jacob investigates a plot by a group of seniors to knit a giant tea cosy to cover the entire city of Montreal for the winter.
12	12	"Jacob Two Two and the Ghost"	November 23, 2003
Jacob is transported back in time to the period of the coureur des bois to investigate the secrets of Claude LaToque, a ghost who ran away from the local graveyard.
13	13	"Jacob Two Two and the Mouldy Menace"	November 30, 2003
Aunt Good-For-You's health shakes cause greater issues to the family than intended.

== Season 2 (2004) ==
No. overall	No. in season	Title	Original release date
14	1	"Jacob Two Two and the Doubtful Double Agent"	February 22, 2004
Jacob gets to join a secret organization, but everything goes wrong when a mission ends with a lifetime detention at the Maximum Detention Facility for stink-bombing the school. He later teams up with an inmate named Diego to break out of the prison.
15	2	"Jacob Two Two's Time Trials"	February 22, 2004
Jacob accidentally breaks Daniels' favorite record and wishes he could go back in time to correct his mistake, only to make events worse.
16	3	"Jacob Two Two and the Tag Team Tempest"	May 16, 2004
Jacob's pal Gary seems to be in league with Con Man Carl Fester King to throw the upcoming bout for the wrestling championship belt.
17	4	"Jacob Two Two and the Spellbound Sibling"	May 23, 2004
Jacob puts a spell on Marfa so she will be nicer to him.
18	5	"Jacob Two Two and the Fun Fair Fiasco"	May 30, 2004
Jacob and Buford build the predicto magic machine for a fortuneteller booth at the school fair and are amazed that it does predict the future.
19	6	"Jacob Two Two and the Monster Mix Up"	May 31, 2004
Jacob does volunteer work at Dr. Leduc's clinic, who is rumored to have a secret laboratory.
20	7	"Jacob Two Two and the Fantastic Fountain"	June 1, 2004
Jacob asks Miss Sweetiepie to tell him the secret to her get up and go.
21	8	"Jacob Two Two and the Furry Felon"	June 2, 2004
Jacob and Buford help a raccoon live in the wild.
22	9	"Jacob Two Two and the Pet Peeve"	June 3, 2004
Jacob and Renee try to find good homes for a group of mangy stray cats; Leo Louse starts a business of finding lost cats and returning them.
23	10	"Jacob Two Two and the Potato Power Project"	June 4, 2004
Jacob is paired with a trio of slackers in a science project to build a potato-powered clock for an important science project.
24	11	"Jacob Two Two and Renee's Rival"	June 6, 2004
Brilliant transfer student, Ann, may replace Renee as the school's top student.
25	12	"Jacob Two Two and the Demon Drooler"	June 21, 2004
Jacob and Buford meet the legendary Demon Drooler while camping in the backyard.
26	13	"Jacob Two Two and the Lost Louse"	June 22, 2004
Jacob falls into the school's lost and found box.

== Season 3 (2004–05) ==
No. overall	No. in season	Title	Original release date
27	1	"Jacob Two Two Times Two"	October 7, 2004
Shortly after Jacob vows revenge on practical jokers Emma and Noah, X. Barnaby Dinglebat accidentally creates a "negative" version of Jake using an unusual camera from his collection. Jake's negative twin pulls numerous mean-spirited pranks around town while the real Jacob takes the heat. In the end, Jake learns that pranksters never prevail, because what goes around comes around.
28	2	"Jacob Two Two and the After School Abattoir"	October 28, 2004
Jake and Buford reluctantly agree to watch a super scary horror movie called "After School Abattoir" with Jake's older siblings. On the day of the viewing, Jake and Buford get trapped inside the school, and the events that take place eerily parallel the movie.
29	3	"Jacob Two Two and the Super Special Skates"	November 4, 2004
Spineless Spencer, a celebrity hockey player who's more interested in the celebrity than the hockey, launches a new line of ice skates. Everyone's got a pair… except for Jacob, who's stuck with an old, hand-me-down pair that look more like boots than skates. Jake endures some light-hearted teasing, but Dad assures him that it's not the gear, but the heart inside the gear that counts. Jake follows this advice and uses it to beat Spineless at his own game.
30	4	"Jacob Two Two and the Simian Switcheroo"	November 11, 2004
Buford accidentally switches places with Bobo, a chimp from Canadian Space Camp. Since the Space Camp excursion was originally meant for Jake, he's somewhat annoyed that Buford went in his stead… until Bobo turns out to be one cool amigo. Having Bobo as a new best friend improves Jake's social status tenfold. Although Jake's enjoying his new popularity, he can't help but miss his best bud. Bobo helps Jacob rescue an eternally oblivious Buford who is headed for the moon in a rocket built from the most Canadian of building materials; birch bark.
31	5	"Jacob Two Two and the Troublesome Twosome"	November 18, 2004
Principal I.M. Greedyguts' good twin brother is so good that everyone at Dreary Meadows wants to enroll in Y.B. Greedyguts' Cheery Meadow's Elementary School. This makes I.M. see the error of his ways when even Sour Pickle jumps ship, but it doesn't move him enough to resort to old-fashioned honesty to get the staff and students to return. And it turns out that if things over at Cheery Meadows seem too good to be true, they probably are. However, Jacob, Buford and Renee eventually learn the truth about Y.B. and Cheery Meadows from Sour Pickle.
32	6	"Jacob Two Two and the Vintage Voice Vortex"	November 19, 2004
When the neighbourhood gets too loud for Miss Sweetiepie, she modifies an old gramophone so that it can capture sound instead of broadcast it. All's well and quiet until Dad's voice is accidentally captured the day before he's to give an important speech. After a pertinent piece of the modernized machine eludes them, the race is on to rebuild the gramophone and recover Dad's voice in time for his big day.
33	7	"Jacob Two Two and the Surprise Disguise"	November 22, 2004
Jacob is mistaken for The Amazing Ronald when he dons the colourful costume at Morty's book signing. At first this causes great embarrassment for Jake, but in the end, he not only fills the costume, he fills the caped crime fighter's shoes, as he foils Fish and Fowl's elaborate plan to take credit for his Dad's latest book. Jake is proud that his adventure is just the inspiration his Dad needs to write his next book.
34	8	"Jacob Two Two and the Socks Dimension"	November 23, 2004
Frustrated by never having a matching pair of socks, Jacob investigates the inner workings of the dryer and discovers that it is actually a portal to a parallel universe. A universe so topsy-turvy that Buford has a day-timer, the bullies are his best friends, and socks are used as currency. Jacob and X. Barnaby Dinglebat hatch a plan to get Jacob back to his proper dimension.
35	9	"Jacob Two Two and the Quibbling Siblings"	December 9, 2004
Due to a spat between Noah and Emma (a.k.a. the Intrepid Shapiro and the Fearless O'Toole), it looks like Kid Power will be disbanded forever, just when Jacob has finally been allowed to join their noble ranks. It's up to Jacob to deal with a looming crisis and heal the rift between his feuding siblings in the process.
36	10	"Jacob Two Two and the Boggie Beastie"	January 27, 2005
Zaidie Saul sees a legendary sea serpent known as "Boggy," but everyone assumes it's just another one of his tall tales. Jacob sets out to prove his Zaidie is telling the truth, and triggers a sea serpent mania that could endanger the shy and peaceful beast—if she really exists, that is.
37	11	"Jacob Two Two and the Pirated Pastry"	January 28, 2005
Jacob and Buford investigate Principal Greedyguts' claim to be the inventor of the jelly donut, and uncover a sordid tale of mystery, double cross and intrigue!
38	12	"Jacob Two Two and the Dangerous Debut"	January 29, 2005
Miss Sour Pickle press gangs Jacob into acting in the school play, which turns out to be cursed. Will a crazed Phantom prowling the catwalks, and demonically possessed co-star treading the stage spell the final curtain for Jacob Two-Two?
39	13	"Jacob Two Two and the Bookworm Brouhaha"	January 30, 2005
Jacob becomes a Library Ninja and vows to track down the "Bookworm" - the Library's most wanted villain and holder of a world record late return fine. To Jacob's shock, it seems all clues lead to his own library-loving Dad!

== Season 4 (2005–06) ==
No. overall	No. in season	Title	Original release date
40	1	"Jacob Two Two and the Crumbling Cookie Catastrophe"	February 3, 2005
Jacob's well-meaning efforts to make his Aunty Good-For You's "Good for You" cookies taste good too leads her into a business partnership with unsavory con man Carl Fester King. Jacob tries to rescue his aunt's recipe and her good reputation.
41	2	"Jacob Two Two and the Valentine's Day Disaster"	February 14, 2005
A pesky love bug buzzes into Jacob's life, causing Melinda to think he has a big crush on her, making Valentine's even more terrifying than usual.
42	3	"Jacob Two Two and the Cranial Classroom Caper"	February 22, 2005
Miss Darling Sweetiepie's stint as a substitute teacher leads her to instill old-fashioned values in her students by turning them (including Jacob) into a bunch of mindless, well-behaved zombies. A school full of mindless zombies is the answer to Principal Greedyguts' wildest dreams.
43	4	"Jacob Two Two and the Wicked Glitch"	March 3, 2005
Jacob and friends travel to Ottawa to confront the Wicked Glitch after Jacob's life is turned upside down thanks to Prime Minister Perry Pleaser's under-budgeted attempt to bring Canada into the computer age.
44	5	"Jacob Two Two and the Big Brain Exchange"	March 10, 2005
When Jacob accidentally switches brains with Principal Greedyguts, he decides to make the best of a bad situation by making life better at Dreary Meadows School. Meanwhile, Greedyguts does his best to make life miserable for Jacob.
45	6	"Jacob Two Two and the Molecular Mayhem"	April 7, 2005
Jacob must rescue Buford and their science teacher from an unknown dimension after Mr. Moleculus' latest invention goes haywire. But first he has to rescue the invention, which is stolen by a greedy thief.
46	7	"Jacob Two Two and the Puzzling Portable"	April 14, 2005
An off-limits portable classroom and the sudden appearance of a muscle-bound supply teacher with a monotone accent (that strangely resembles Arnold Schwarzenegger) adds up to Jacob being the "chosen one" who is destined to save all of mankind from some terrible future fate. Meanwhile, Renée attempts to get the boys to say "personkind" instead of "mankind".
47	8	"Jacob Two Two and the Priceless Puck"	April 21, 2005
Reformed criminals Fish and Fowl become unlikely allies as Jacob worries that X. Barnaby Dinglebat has become a jewel thief, after he disappears with the fabled Stanley Puck Diamond.
48	9	"Jacob Two Two and the Mata Hari Hamster"	April 28, 2005
Jacob fears an important spy mission may be compromised when his spying partner Agent Intrepid falls for a mysterious female hamster named Daisy, while Carl Fester King corners the country's maple syrup reserves.
49	10	"Jacob Two Two and the Teacher's Pet"	May 5, 2005
Jacob finds life on Miss Sour Pickle's good side is even worse than being on her bad side. When he attempts to restore the proper order, he only becomes even more of a "teacher's pet".
50	11	"Jacob Two Two and the Wooden Nickel Knuckleheads"	May 12, 2005
Jacob comes into possession of a very rare and valuable coin. Word of his good fortune travels quickly amongst every greedy character he's ever had the misfortune of meeting, and soon they join forces to take it from him.
51	12	"Jacob Two Two and the Halloween Hullabaloo"	October 20, 2005
When Jacob calls his teacher a mean old witch for handing out a homework assignment on Halloween, he almost doesn't live to regret it.
52	13	"Jacob Two Two's Broadcast Bungle"	January 16, 2006
While playing with walkie-talkies borrowed from X. Barnaby Dinglebat, Jacob suspects his Mom is the ring leader of a band of spies after hearing radio interference. He finds that once the Canadian Armed Forces are on red alert, they won't quit until they get their man... or Mom as the case may be.

== Season 5 (2005–06) ==
No. overall	No. in season	Title	Original release date
53	1	"Jacob Two Two and the Persistent Assistant"	September 20, 2005
Jacob's ghostly friend Claude LaToque, helps Buford become a skateboard stunt artist. Jacob's attempts to end the perilous folly are thwarted by the bully boys, eager to capture a spectacular skateboard crash on video.
54	2	"Jacob Two Two and the Big Writing Wrinkle"	September 21, 2005
In a mix-up of literary proportions, Jacob wins a student writing competition for a manuscript Dad wrote, while Dad receives a rejection letter from his publisher for a story that Jacob wrote. Can the mess be straightened out? Or will Jacob end up winning the upcoming national competition for a story that isn't his?
55	3	"Jacob Two Two and the Rose Coloured Calamity"	September 22, 2005
To force a letter of recommendation out of the student body, Greedyguts turns Dreary Meadows into a work camp! Jacob leads the kids in a test of wills, and the outcome hinges on a mysterious pair of sunglasses that make everything seem perfect to whoever puts them on.
56	4	"Jacob Two Two and the Comic Book Caper"	September 23, 2005
Jacob and his friends rescue a stolen shipment of comic books from Principal Greedyguts.
57	5	"Jacob Two Two and the Uber Odour"	September 24, 2005
Carl Fester King has a new money-making scheme. Using stolen hockey bags, he'll create the worst smelling substance on earth, stink up Montreal, then make a fortune selling air fresheners! But then, the stinkonium is stolen from King. With Noah grounded for stinking Jacob out of his room with a stink bomb, it's up to Jacob and Emma to track down the second ‘stinker,' who has his own agenda for the stuff…
58	6	"Jacob Two Two and the Souped up Soapbox"	September 26, 2005
Defending his family's unblemished record in an annual soapbox derby, Jacob must decide whether to "cheat or not to cheat" against Wilson, intent on winning the race by any means possible! It's only after Jacob gets in touch with his "family's winning spirit" that he finds a way to best the boastful bully and coast to victory!
59	7	"Jacob Two Two and the Perfect Present"	September 27, 2005
Jacob buys a back-scratcher that grants wishes, but before he can wish for the perfect present for his mom's birthday, Greedyguts and Leo snatch it away. Comic mayhem ensues as the thieves' selfish wishes go awry.
60	8	"Jacob Two Two and the Too Big Tomato"	September 28, 2005
Everything goes wrong for Jacob because he's so small. When Mr. Moleculus shows Jacob his formula for growing giant tomatoes, Jacob borrows it to use on himself, eventually causing him to transform into a round red-skinned Hulk-like giant. But as Jacob grows, his problems grow too.
61	9	"Jacob Two Two and the Robot Rescue"	April 24, 2006
When Jacob undertakes to mind Marfa's science project, an Artificial Intelligence robot, he doesn't figure on wiping its memory clean. But when he reprograms the robot, he inadvertently loads it with his Dude Funslinger computer game. Now the robot acts like Dude Funslinger and is off to rid the world of space zombies.
62	10	"Jacob Two Two and the Hockey Seat Hoopla"	May 19, 2006
The spirit of a long departed hockey player is released from an old arena seat and possesses Jacob's family. The only way for Jacob to break the spell is to join his family and play a hockey game against the Montreal Marvels.
