= Booth Savage =

Canadian actor (born 1948)

- Born: May 21, 1948 (age 78); Fredericton, New Brunswick, Canada
- Education: York University
- Occupation: Actor
- Years active: 1974–present
- Spouse: Janet-Laine Green
- Children: 2, including Tyrone Savage
- Awards: Gemini Award

Booth Savage (born May 21, 1948) is a Canadian actor.

== Early life and education ==
Savage graduated with a Master of Fine Arts from York University in 1992.

== Career ==
Screen

Savage is perhaps best known for his role as Team Canada head coach Harry Sinden in the 2006 CBC miniseries, Canada Russia '72.

Stage

Savage is a playwright and stage actor. The plays he has written including Savage Heat, DADS, Reversing Falls, Pillow Talk, Pajama Games and This Bloody Business have been performed across Canada. He is also an actor member of Toronto's Theatre Passe Muraille and Toronto Free Theatre. He has performed in over 100 plays in every province and territory in Canada, with the exception of Yukon.

Savage is currently part of the Canadore College Theatre program faculty.

=== Awards ===
In 1987, he won a Gemini Award for Best Actor in a Leading Role for his role as Felix Batterinski in Allan King's The Last Season.

Booth also taught Dramatic Arts at York University in 1992.

== Personal life ==
Savage is married to actress Janet-Laine Green, and has two children. Their son Tyrone Savage is also an actor.

== Filmography ==
Booth Savage film and television credits
Year	Title	Role	Notes	Ref.
1974	The Collaborators	Unknown	1 episode	
1979	Stone Cold Dead	Unknown	Theatrical film	
1980	You've Come a Long Way, Katie	Unknown	TV miniseries (3 episodes)	
1980	Home Fires	Bruce McLeod	Main role	
1980	The Littlest Hobo	Truck Driver, Joe	1 episode	
1981	Silence of the North	Howard	Theatrical film	
1982	Little Gloria... Happy at Last	Unknown	TV miniseries (2 episodes)	
1983	Curtains	Amanda's Boyfriend	Theatrical film	
1983	For the Record	Unknown	1 episode	
1984, 1986	Seeing Things	Rod / Nick	2 episodes	
1985	Samuel Lount	Edward Kennedy	Theatrical film	
1985	Striker's Mountain	Dave Cameron	Theatrical film	
1986	Philip Marlowe, Private Eye	George Carter	1 episode	
1986	Night Heat	Cliff Colclough	1 episode	
1986	Hot Shots	Jason "Jake" West	Main role (13 episodes)	
1986	The Last Season	Felix Batterinski	Theatrical film	
1988	Chasing Rainbows	"Chicago" Benny Rose	14 episodes	
1988	T. and T.	Harry	1 episode	
1989	The Beachcombers	Ted Blake	2 episodes	
1990	Sanity Clause	Mike	Television film	
1990	Labor of Love	Unknown	Television film	
1990–1991	Street Legal	Sid Novak Jr.	3 episodes	
1991	Tropical Heat (Sweating Bullets)	Guy Hastings	1 episode	
1991	The Photographer's Wife	Gordon	Theatrical film	
1991, 1993	E.N.G.	Tex Yeager / Terance Graves	2 episodes	
1993	Secret Service	Wade	1 episode	
1993	Survive the Night	Andrew	Television film	
1993	Counterstrike	Detective Malecki	Episode: "French Twist"	
1994	Thicker Than Blood: The Larry McLinden Story	David Meadows	Television film	
1995	Kung Fu: The Legend Continues	Greg Vinson	1 episode	
1996	Wind at My Back	Jack Bailey	1 episode	
1998	Goosebumps	Tom Morgan	1 episode	
1998	Thanks of a Grateful Nation	Gary Wall	Television film	
1999	Ricky Nelson: Original Teen Idol	Lew Chudd	Television film	
2001	Nora Robert's Sanctuary	Sheriff Bill Duer	Television film	
2001	Harvard Man	Steve Jensen	Theatrical film	
2002	Narc	Cecil Mitchum	Theatrical film	
2003	Blue Murder	Constable Phil Bishop	1 episode	
2004	The Eleventh Hour (Bury the Lead)	Simon Redner	1 episode	
2005	This Is Wonderland	Unknown	1 episode	
2005	Sue Thomas: F.B. Eye	Mr. Osmund	1 episode	
2005	Swarmed	Agent Doug Heydon	Television film	
2006	1-800-Missing	Mark Stryker	2 episodes	
2006	Canada Russia '72	Harry Sinden	Harry Sinden	
2007	The Jane Show	Brady O'Flynn	4 episodes	
2008	The Call	Brakka	Television film	
2008	M.V.P.	Unknown	2 episodes	
2007–2008	Rabbit Fall	Stanton Martinsky	Main Role (8 episodes)	
2009	The Listener	Wade Lassiter	1 episode	
2009	Being Erica	Larry Horowitz	1 episode	
2011	King	Defense Attorney	1 episode	
2011–2015	Mr. D	Principal Callaghan	46 episodes	
2016	Slasher VR	Unknown	Direct to video film	
2016	Slasher	Ronald Edwards	3 episodes	
2019	Isabelle	Clifford Kane	Theatrical film	
