= Jean Archambault =

Canadian politician and farmer

Jean Archambault (14 December 1780 – 1831) was a farmer and political figure in Lower Canada. He represented Leinster in the Legislative Assembly of Lower Canada from 1800 to 1808. His name also appears as Jean-Baptiste Archambault.

He was born in L'Assomption, the son of Jean Archambault and Françoise Beaudry. In 1806, he married Marie-Josephte Payet, dit Saint-Amour. He did not run for reelection in 1808. Archambault died in Saint-Roch-de-l'Achigan.
