= Hot Shots (Canadian TV series) =

Canadian television drama series

- Genre: Drama
- Starring: Dorothy Parke; Booth Savage; Paul Burke; Clark Johnson; Heather Smith
- Countries of origin: United States; Canada
- Original language: English
- No. of seasons: 1
- No. of episodes: 13

Original release
- Network: CBS (U.S.); CTV (Canada)
- Release: 1986 – 1987

Hot Shots is a Canadian television drama series, which aired on CBS in the United States in 1986, and CTV in Canada in 1987.

The series, produced by CTV for the CBS Late Night block of crime drama series, starred Dorothy Parke and Booth Savage as Amanda Reed and Jake West, crime journalists for the tabloid magazine Crime World. The cast also included Paul Burke, Clark Johnson, Heather Smith, and Mung Ling.

Only thirteen episodes of the show were produced. Its producers went on to create Diamonds the following year.

== Cast ==
- Dorothy Parke as Amanda Reed
- Booth Savage as Jason West
- Paul Burke as Nicholas Broderick
- Clark Johnson as Al Pendleton
- Heather Smith as Cleo
- Louis Negin as Goldsmith
