= Joy Coghill =

Canadian actress, director and writer

- Born: May 13, 1926; Findlater, Saskatchewan, Canada
- Died: January 20, 2017 (aged 90); Vancouver, British Columbia, Canada
- Other name: Joy Coghill Thorne
- Education: University of British Columbia (BA); Art Institute of Chicago (MFA)
- Occupations: Actress, director, writer
- Years active: 1950–2003
- Spouse: John Thorne
- Children: 3
- Website: www.joycoghill.com

Joy Dorothy Coghill-Thorne, CM, (May 13, 1926 – January 20, 2017) was a Canadian actress, director, and writer. Her obituary in The Vancouver Sun described her as having had "a seven-decade run at the top of the Vancouver theatre world."

== Early life and education ==
Coghill was born in Findlater, Saskatchewan, Canada on May 13, 1926, the daughter of J.G. Coghill and Dorothy Pollard Coghill. Her father was a Presbyterian minister. She was educated at King's Park Secondary School and Queen's Park Secondary School in Glasgow, Scotland. After returning to Canada, she attended Kitsilano Secondary School and began performing in school theatre productions. She earned a Bachelor of Arts degree from the University of British Columbia in 1949 and a Master of Fine Arts degree from the Art Institute of Chicago in 1951.

== Career ==
Coghill and Myra Benson founded Canada's first professional touring children's theatre, Holiday Theatre in 1953. From 1967 to 1969, Coghill was the artistic director of the Vancouver Playhouse. She was the first woman to hold that position. In 1994, Coghill founded Western Gold, a theatre company for senior professional actors in Vancouver. She also served as a director for the National Theatre School's English drama section in 1960. She held honorary degrees from Simon Fraser University and the University of British Columbia.

Her best-known work is Song of This Place, a play about the Canadian artist Emily Carr. In addition to her writing, Coghill has made guest appearances on Da Vinci's Inquest as Portia Da Vinci and as the dying human host Saroosh/Selmak on the Stargate SG-1 episode "The Tok'ra, Part 1 & 2".

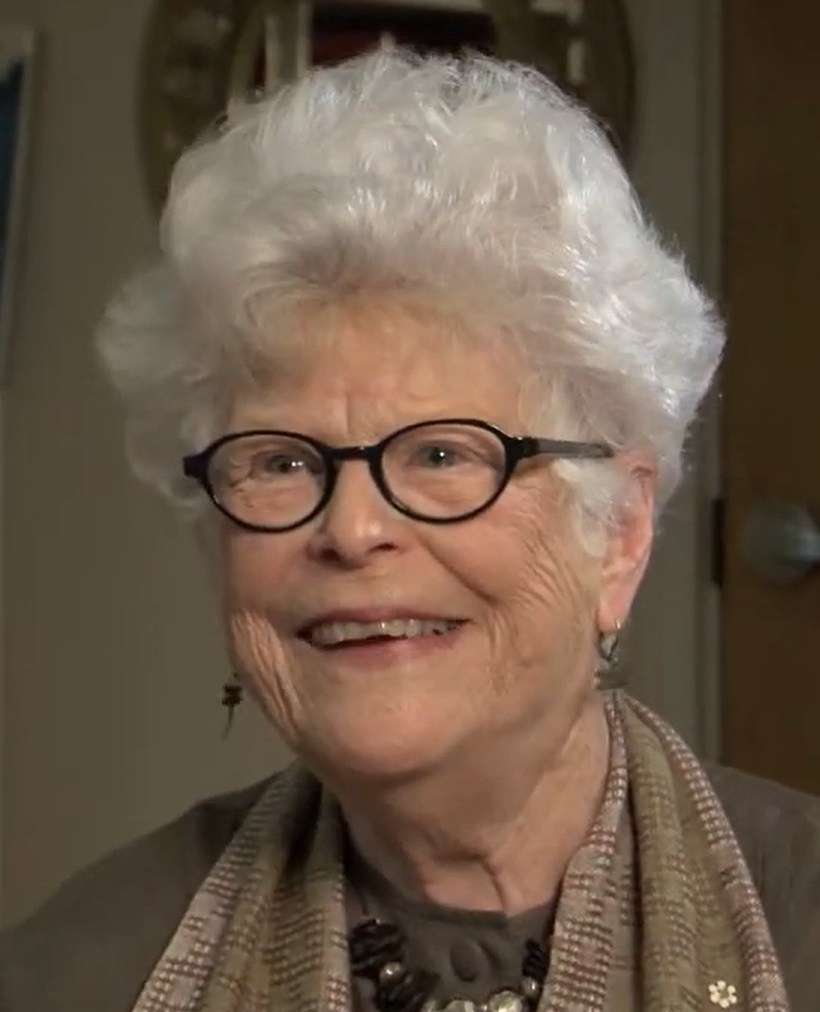
Joy Coghill in 2010

Coghill received four Jessie Richardson Theatre Awards for her theatrical accomplishments in Vancouver, British Columbia: Vancouver Professional Theatre Alliance Award (1988–1989), Community Recognition Award (1989–1990), Outstanding Performance by an Actress in a Leading Role (1990–1991), and Unique Mandate and Contribution to the Theatre Community (1998–1999).

Other awards include a Governor General's Performing Arts Award for Lifetime Artistic Achievement, the Gemini Humanitarian Award, the Dominion Drama Festival acting award and a Canadian drama award. On October 25, 1990, she was made a member of the Order of Canada and cited as "a champion of Canadian talent and quality and as "a continuing inspiration to her colleagues in theatre throughout the country."

== Personal life ==
Coghill was married to John Thorne, a producer for the Canadian Broadcasting Corporation. On January 20, 2017, Coghill died of massive heart failure at St. Paul's Hospital, Vancouver, British Columbia, Canada. She was 90. She was survived by three children and two grandchildren.

== Plays ==
- Song of This Place

== Filmography ==
=== Film ===
Year	Title	Role	Notes
1975	Shivers	Mona Wheatley	
1978	Jacob Two-Two Meets the Hooded Fang	Mistress Fowl	
1984	Change of Heart	Edna	
1987	Blue Monkey	Dede Wilkens	
1994	Andre	Betsy	
1998	The Sleep Room	Mrs. Olson	
1999	Double Jeopardy	Neighbor In Garden	
2000	A Day in a Life	Dorthy	

=== Television ===
Year	Title	Role	Notes
1955	General Motors Theatre	Sally	Episode: "Never Say No"
1959	Studio Pacific	Alice	Episode: "Anyone for Alice"
1980, 1985	The Beachcombers	Gertie	2 episodes
1986	Nobody's Child	Patient #1	Television film
1986	Red Serge	Ruby Burris	Episode: "Apron Springs"
1987	Airwolf	Reverend Mother	Episode: "Flowers of the Mountain"
1987	Christmas Comes to Willow Creek	Charlotte	Television film
1989	Unsub	Mrs. Gleason	Episode: "White Bone Demon"
1991	21 Jump Street	Mrs. Dixon	Episode: "Coppin' Out"
1991	Omen IV: The Awakening	Sister Francesca	Television film
1991	Street Justice	Rosemary Lyttle	Episode: "Sanctuary"
1991	My Son Johnny	Anna Cortino	Television film
1993	Miracle on Interstate 880	Sister Mary	Television film
1993	Sherlock Holmes Returns	Ms. Baker	Television film
1993	Whose Child Is This? The War for Baby Jessica	Earlen	Television film
1994	Snowbound: The Jim and Jennifer Stolpa Story	Dr. Jorgenson	Television film
1994	The Commish	Mrs. Dawson	Episode: "Revenge"
1995	The X-Files	Linda Thibedeaux	Episode: "Aubrey"
1995	The Other Mother: A Moment of Truth Movie	Sister Vincent	Television film
1995	Sliders	Mrs. Ezra Tweak	Episode: "Summer of Love"
1995	My Life as a Dog	Auntie Auntie / Astrid Árnesson	6 episodes
1996	Color Me Perfect	Jennifer	Television film
1996, 1997	Poltergeist: The Legacy	Elizabeth Baker / Mrs. Blake	2 episodes
1997	Viper	Mother Grace	Episode: "Echo of Murder"
1998	The Outer Limits	Jean	Episode: "The Vaccine"
1998	Stargate SG-1	Saroosh / Selmak	2 episodes
1998	The Crow: Stairway to Heaven	Laura Stansbury	Episode: "Before I Wake"
1998–2003	Da Vinci's Inquest	Portia Da Vinci	6 episodes
1999	Nothing Too Good for a Cowboy	Violet Hutchison	Episode: "Deja Vu All Over Again"
2000	The Christmas Secret	Old Woman	Television film
2002	Living with the Dead	Mrs. Ziff	Television film
2003	Betrayed	Mabel Stewart	Television film
