= Zachary Ansley =

Canadian actor and lawyer

- Born: Zachary Jason Ansley; 21 January 1972 (age 54); Vancouver, British Columbia, Canada
- Occupation: Actor
- Years active: 1985–2002
- Spouse: Megan Frazer (m. 2006)

Zachary Jason Ansley (born 21 January 1972) is a Canadian actor. He has been acting professionally since he was eleven years old. He was the winner of the first YTV Acting Award (1989). A graduate of Circle in the Square Acting School, New York City, after graduation he acted with Willow Cabin Theatre, New York, before returning to Vancouver to resume his film and television career.

He received a Genie Award nomination for Best Actor at the 10th Genie Awards in 1989, for his performance in the film Cowboys Don't Cry.

== Filmography ==
=== Film ===
Year	Title	Role	Notes
1985	The Journey of Natty Gann	Louie	
1986	The Christmas Star	John Sumner	
1986	Differences	Chris	Short
1988	Cowboys Don't Cry	Shane Morgan	
1990	Princes in Exile	Ryan Rafferty	
1993	This Boy's Life	Skipper Hansen	
1999	Second Date	Jason	Short

=== Television ===
Year	Title	Role	Notes
1987	Christmas Comes to Willow Creek	Michael	TV film
1988	9B	John Skelly	"Nomination", "Jealousy", "Accident"
1988	Red River	Cal	TV film
1990	MacGyver	Todd Fowler	"The Gun"
1990	21 Jump Street	Jeremy Stowe	"This Ain't No Summer Camp"
1993	Miracle on Interstate 880	Jeff Helm	TV film
1993	Scales of Justice	Steven Truscott	Episode "Regina v Truscott"
1993, 2001	The X-Files	Billy Miles	Recurring role
1993–96	Road to Avonlea	Arthur Pettibone	Recurring role
1994	The Diary of Evelyn Lau	Tommy	TV film
1995	Madison	Riley	"Fun Is Good", "When the Bough Breaks"
1997	The Outer Limits	Adrielo	"Feasibility Study"
1998	Welcome to Paradox	Obsic	"Hemeac"
1998	Happy Christmas, Miss King	Arthur Pettibone	TV film
1998–99	Mercy Point	Bortok	"New Arrivals", "No Mercy", "Battle Scars"
1999	First Wave	Fergus McKay	"Deluge"
1999	Poltergeist: The Legacy	Brother Thomas	"The Portents"
1999	Cold Squad	Kyle Bradley	"Dead End"
2000	The Spring	Robert Lovell / Woodrow Lovell	TV film
2001	The Sports Pages	Peyton	TV film
2001	UC: Undercover	James Wheeler	"Nobody Rides for Free"
2002	John Doe	Steve	"Blood Lines"
2002	The Twilight Zone	Carl	"Mr. Motivation"
