= List of accolades received by Millennium =

Accolades received by Millennium
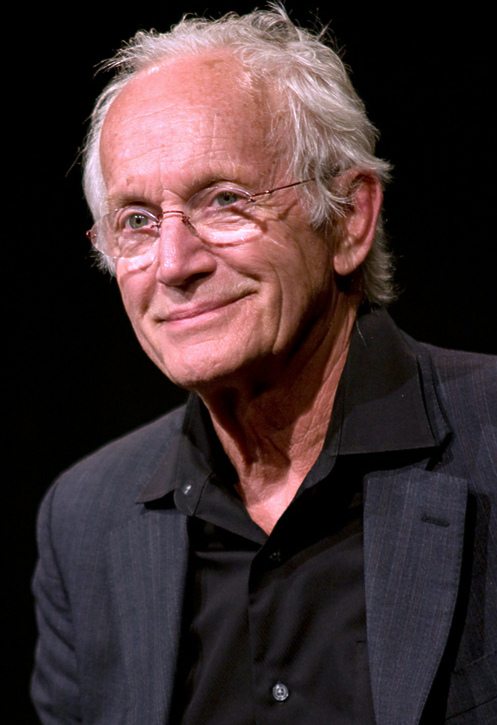
- Lance Henriksen received three Golden Globe Award nominations for his work on the series.
Awards & Nominations
Award	Won	Nominated
American Society of Cinematographers	0	4
Bram Stoker Award	0	1
Canadian Society of Cinematographers	3	3
Emmy Awards	0	2
Genesis Awards	1	1
Golden Globe Awards	0	3
International Horror Guild Awards	0	1
Motion Picture Sound Editors	0	1
Online Film and Television Association	1	8
People's Choice Awards	1	1
Young Artist Awards	1	5
- Total number of wins and nominations
Totals	7	30
- Footnotes

Millennium is an American crime-thriller television series which was broadcast between 1996 and 1999. Created by Chris Carter, the series aired on Fox for three seasons with a total of sixty-seven episodes. However, an episode of its sister show The X-Files—also titled "Millennium"—was later produced in order to give a sense of closure to the series. Millennium starred Lance Henriksen, Megan Gallagher, Klea Scott, and Brittany Tiplady, with Henriksen and Tiplady earning award nominations for their roles.

Henriksen portrayed Frank Black, an offender profiler who worked for the Millennium Group, a private investigative organisation. Black retired from the Federal Bureau of Investigation to move his wife (Gallagher) and daughter (Tiplady) to Seattle, where he began to consult on criminal cases for the Group. After his wife's death, he returned to the FBI to work with new partner Emma Hollis (Scott) to discredit the Group.

Since its 1996 debut, Millennium has received several awards, including four American Society of Cinematographers Awards, two Primetime Emmy Awards, three Golden Globe Awards, one People's Choice Award, and five Young Artist Awards. In its three-year tenure, the series earned a total of twenty-one award nominations. Cinematographer Robert McLachlan and actress Brittany Tiplady providing the series' only individual wins, while the first season episode "Broken World" earned its only episodic win. A 1997 People's Choice Award for Favourite New TV Dramatic Series was the only award won by the series as a whole.

== American Society of Cinematographers ==
Millennium was nominated for four American Society of Cinematographers awards, without winning any of them. Robert McLachlan earned three of these nominations, with Peter Wunstorf providing the fourth. Wunstorf lost the 1997 award to William Wages for the television film Buffalo Soldiers, while two of McLachlan's three nominations were lost to Bill Roe—for The X-Files' "Drive" in 1999, and "Agua Mala" in 2000—while his 1998 nomination was lost to Marc Reshovsky for the 3rd Rock from the Sun episode "Nightmare on Dick Street".

Year	Category	Nominee	Episode	Result	Reference
1997	Outstanding Achievement in Cinematography in a Movie of the Week or Pilot	Peter Wunstorf	"Pilot"	Nominated	
1998	Outstanding Achievement in Cinematography in a Regular Series	Robert McLachlan	"The Thin White Line"	Nominated	
1999	Outstanding Achievement in Cinematography in a Regular Series	Robert McLachlan	"Skull and Bones"	Nominated	
2000	Outstanding Achievement in Cinematography in a Regular Series	Robert McLachlan	"Matryoshka"	Nominated	

== Bram Stoker Award ==
Millennium was nominated for one Bram Stoker Award in 1999, for Darin Morgan's episode "Somehow, Satan Got Behind Me"; the award was won jointly by Bill Condon for Gods and Monsters and Alex Proyas, David S. Goyer and Lem Dobbs for Dark City.

Year	Category	Nominee	Episode	Result	Reference
1999	Bram Stoker Award for Best Screenplay	Darin Morgan	"Somehow, Satan Got Behind Me"	Nominated	

== Canadian Society of Cinematographers ==
Millennium was nominated for three Canadian Society of Cinematographers awards, with nominee Robert McLachlan winning all three times.

Year	Category	Nominee	Result	Reference
1997	Best Cinematography in TV Series	Robert McLachlan	Won	
1998	Best Cinematography in TV Series	Robert McLachlan	Won	
1999	Outstanding Achievement in Cinematography in Regular Series	Robert McLachlan	Won	

== Emmy Awards ==
Millennium was nominated for two Primetime Emmy Awards, both in 1998. Charles Nelson Reilly earned an acting nod for his guest role in "Jose Chung's Doomsday Defense", losing out to The Practice's John Larroquette. Millennium also earned a nomination for Outstanding Sound Editing for a Series, losing the award to ER.

Year	Category	Nominee	Episode	Result	Reference
1998	Outstanding Guest Actor in a Drama Series	Charles Nelson Reilly	"Jose Chung's Doomsday Defense"	Nominated	
1998	Outstanding Sound Editing for a Series	Mark R. Crookston, Maciek Malish, Gabrielle Gilbert Reeves, Ken Gladden, Debby Ruby-Winsberg, Donna Beltz, Michael Kimball, Susan Welsh, Jarmil Maupin, Jeff Charbonneau, Michael Salvetta, Gary Marullo	"Owls"	Nominated	

== Genesis Awards ==
Millennium was nominated for one Genesis Award, which it won. The first season episode "Broken World" was singled out for the award, presented by the Humane Society of the United States in 1998.

Year	Category	Nominee	Result	Reference
1998	Television Dramatic Series	"Broken World"	Won	

== Golden Globe Awards ==
Lance Henriksen received three Golden Globe Award nominations for his portrayal of Frank Black. Henriksen's first loss was to David Duchovny's role as Fox Mulder in The X-Files, followed by a loss to Anthony Edwards as ER's Mark Greene, and finally coming in behind Dylan McDermott's portrayal of Bobby Donnell in The Practice.

Year	Category	Nominee	Result	Reference
1997	Golden Globe Award for Best Actor – Television Series Drama	Lance Henriksen	Nominated	
1998	Golden Globe Award for Best Actor – Television Series Drama	Lance Henriksen	Nominated	
1999	Golden Globe Award for Best Actor – Television Series Drama	Lance Henriksen	Nominated	

== International Horror Guild Awards ==
Millennium was nominated for an International Horror Guild Award in 1999, honoring work from 1998; the series lost the award to Buffy the Vampire Slayer.

Year	Category	Nominee	Result	Reference
1999	International Horror Guild Award for Television	Millennium	Nominated	

== Motion Picture Sound Editors ==
Millennium was nominated for a Golden Reel Award by the Motion Picture Sound Editors society at their 46th annual ceremony, in 1999. The nomination ultimately lost out to hospital drama E.R. at the event.

Year	Category	Nominee	Result	Reference
1999	Best sound editing in episodic television, effects and foley	Millennium	Nominated	

== Online Film and Television Association ==
Millennium was nominated for several awards by the Online Film and Television Association during the course of their first three ceremonies. At the inaugural ceremony in 1997, for work produced in 1996, the series vied for seven awards—including "Best New Drama Series", which it lost to EZ Streets; "Best Music in a Series", which it lost to The X-Files; "Best Visual Effects in a Series", which was won by Star Trek: Deep Space Nine; "Best New Title Sequence in a Series", being beaten by Sabrina the Teenage Witch, and "Best Episode of a Drama Series", in which "Pilot" was beaten by the E.R. episode "One More for the Road". However, series composer Mark Snow came away with a win in the category "Best New Theme Song in a Series".

The following year, the series earned another nomination, this time for "Best Sound in a Series", again losing the eventual award to The X-Files. In 1999, honoring work throughout 1998, Millennium received a nomination for "Best Lighting in a Series", which it lost to The X-Files, and another for "Best Production Design in a Series", which it lost to Star Trek: Deep Space Nine.

Year	Category	Nominee	Result	Reference
1997	Best New Theme Song in a Series	Mark Snow, Millennium	Won	
1997	Best New Drama Series	Millennium	Nominated	
1997	Best Visual Effects in a Series	Millennium	Nominated	
1997	Best New Title Sequence in a Series	Millennium	Nominated	
1997	Best Episode in a Drama Series	"Pilot"	Nominated	
1997	Best Music in a Series	Millennium	Nominated	
1998	Best Sound in a Series	Millennium	Nominated	
1999	Best Lighting in a Series	Millennium	Nominated	
1999	Best Production Design in a Series	Millennium	Nominated	

== People's Choice Awards ==
Millennium received one People's Choice Awards nomination, winning in the category "Favorite New TV Dramatic Series".

Year	Category	Nominee	Result	Reference
1997	Favorite New TV Dramatic Series	Millennium	Won	

== Young Artist Awards ==
Millennium was nominated for five Young Artist Awards and has won one. Brittany Tiplady earned a win and three other nominations for her role as Jordan Black; while guest star Lauren Diewold, who had appeared in the episode "Monster", earned the show another nomination at the 1998 ceremony. Tiplady's 1997 loss was to Ashli Amari Adams for her role in The Parent 'Hood, later being beaten out by Scarlett Pomers for Star Trek: Voyager in 1999, and Mae Middleton for Any Day Now in 2000. Diewold's 1998 nomination would be won by Cara Rose for Touched by an Angel.

Year	Category	Nominee	Result	Reference
1997	Best Performance in a TV Comedy/Drama – Supporting Young Actress Age Ten or Under	Brittany Tiplady	Nominated	
1998	Best Performance in a TV Comedy/Drama – Supporting Young Actress Age Ten or Under	Brittany Tiplady	Won	
1998	Best Performance in a TV Drama Series – Guest Starring Young Actress	Lauren Diewold	Nominated	
1999	Best Performance in a TV Comedy/Drama – Supporting Young Actress Age Ten or Under	Brittany Tiplady	Nominated	
2000	Best Performance in a TV Comedy/Drama – Supporting Young Actress Age Ten or Under	Brittany Tiplady	Nominated	
