= Covenant (Millennium) =

- Millennium episode
- Episode no.: Season 1 Episode 16
- Directed by: Roderick J. Pridy
- Written by: Robert Moresco
- Production code: 4C16
- Original air date: March 21, 1997

Guest appearances
- John Finn as William Garry; Michael O'Neill as County Prosecutor Calvin Smith; Sarah Koskoff as Didi Higgens; Jay Underwood as Michael Slattery; Steve Bacic as Deputy Kevin Reilly; Don MacKay as Jack Meredith; Nicole Oliver as Dr. Alice Steele; Colleen Winton as Mrs. Dolores Garry; Tyler Thompson as William Garry, Jr.; George Gordon as Judge Francis Maher

Episode chronology
← Previous "Sacrament"	Next → "Walkabout"
- Millennium season 1

"'Covenant" is the sixteenth episode of the first season of the American crime-thriller television series Millennium. It premiered on the Fox network on March 21, 1997. The episode was written by Robert Moresco, and directed by Roderick J. Pridy. "Covenant" featured guest appearances by John Finn, Michael O'Neill and Sarah Koskoff.

Millennium Group consultant Frank Black (Lance Henriksen) travels to Utah to construct a profile on a convicted murderer (Finn) who is asking for the death sentence. Reconstructing the crime, Black begins to doubt the man's guilt.

Elements of "Covenant" were inspired by real-life murderers Susan Smith and Arthur Shawcross. The episode was viewed by approximately 6.7 million households in its original broadcast. It has received positive reviews, with Moresco's script praised for its subtlety.

== Plot ==
Millennium Group consultant Frank Black (Lance Henriksen) travels to Provo, Utah, to meet Calvin Smith (Michael O'Neill), who is prosecuting a local murder case; and Didi Higgens (Sarah Koskoff), a pathologist for the medical examiner's office. The case concerns former sheriff William Garry (John Finn), who has been convicted of killing his family. Garry pleaded guilty to murders and forensic evidence has linked him to the murder weapon, a wood-carving chisel. Black has been asked to construct an offender profile for Garry to determine whether he is sufficiently dangerous to society for the judge to issue the death penalty. Garry himself is asking to be executed.

Black travels to Garry's home with a deputy, Kevin Reilly (Steve Bacic). Daubed in blood on the kitchen window are the numbers "1 28 15", which Reilly notes no one has been able to understand. Black also listens to a recording of Garry's confession, which details the murders meticulously. He convinces Garry's attorney to allow him to be interviewed. Garry tells Black he had planned the murders for some time, motivated by hatred for his wife and monetary concerns. Black refutes this, pointing out that Garry had carved a wooden angel as a gift for his wife that same day, using the chisel involved in the murders. Smith, realizing that Black does not believe Garry to be guilty, dismisses him from the case.

Black discovers that Garry had been having an extramarital affair, having previously believed that his wife was unfaithful; he also realizes that Garry was unaware that his wife was pregnant. Black has Higgens help him in getting the bodies exhumed, allowing the two to see that Mrs. Garry's wounds were not defensive, but self-inflicted. Black also determines that the message written in blood was in fact "I 28 15"—Book of Isaiah, chapter 28, verse 15; which is concerned with lies and falsehoods. Black pieces together the actual events of the night of the murders, realizing that Mrs. Garry killed her children before committing suicide, causing Garry to seek atonement by admitting to the crimes. Reilly admits to having helped Garry rearrange the crime scene to incriminate himself; Black urges him to come forward with the real events to save his friend's life.

== Production ==
"Covenant" was written by Robert Moresco and directed by Roderick J. Pridy, and was the first contribution to the series by either of the two. Moresco would go on to write "Broken World" later in the first season, and also acted as a producer during the series' run. Pridy would return to helm the second season episode "The Mikado".

Guest star John Finn would go on to appear in Millennium's sister show The X-Files, playing the recurring character Michael Kritschgau in several episodes beginning with season four's "Gethsemane". Sarah Koskoff, who portrayed assistant pathologist Didi Higgens, also had a minor recurring role in The X-Files, making several appearances as an alien abductee. "Covenant" featured the last appearance in the series by Don MacKay as the Black family's neighbour Jack Meredith. MacKay had previously portrayed the character in "Pilot", "Gehenna" and "Weeds".

The murders may have been inspired by the case of Susan Smith, a mother of two who drowned her children by sinking her car in a lake. Mention is also made in the episode of Arthur Shawcross, whose recidivism is cited by Garry's prosecutors as an example of why murder should warrant a death penalty. Shawcross was released from prison after serving a sentence for killing two children, only to kill eleven women while on parole.

== Broadcast and reception ==
"Covenant" was first broadcast on the Fox Network on March 21, 1997. The episode earned a Nielsen rating of 6.9 during its original broadcast, meaning that 6.9 percent of households in the United States viewed the episode. This represented approximately 6.7 million households, and left the episode the sixty-third most-viewed broadcast that week. (Note: Each ratings point represented 970,000 households during the 1996–1997 television season.)

The episode received positive reviews from critics. The A.V. Club's Emily VanDerWerff rated the episode a B+, praising Moresco's script for its subtlety. VanDerWerff noted the premise's similarity to the Susan Smith case, and felt that the episode "actually gains strength from a certain distance from when it originally aired. Back then, it was just another ripped-from-the-headlines tale of a murderous mother. Now, it’s a crafty mystery that doesn’t reveal its cards until late". Bill Gibron, writing for DVD Talk, rated the episode 4 out of 5, noting that the episode "broke clichés and trampled all over formulas". Robert Shearman and Lars Pearson, in their book Wanting to Believe: A Critical Guide to The X-Files, Millennium & The Lone Gunmen, rated "Covenant" four-and-a-half stars out of five, calling it "Millennium's version of Twelve Angry Men". Shearman praised Morseco's writing, noting that the episode was "tightly plotted and boast[ed] extremely good dialogue". Shearman felt that Koskoff's acting showed a "naivety that isn't as subtle as the script demands", but overall felt that the episode was "fresh and exciting".

== Footnotes ==
=== References ===
- Genge, N. E. (1997). Millennium: The Unofficial Companion Volume One. Century. ISBN 0-7126-7833-6.
- Genge, N. E. (1997). Millennium: The Unofficial Companion Volume Two. Century. ISBN 0712678697.
- Shearman, Robert; Pearson, Lars (2009). Wanting to Believe: A Critical Guide to The X-Files, Millennium & The Lone Gunmen. Mad Norwegian Press. ISBN 978-0975944691.
