= 19:19 =

- Millennium episode
- Episode no.: Season 2 Episode 7
- Directed by: Thomas J. Wright
- Written by: Glen Morgan; James Wong
- Production code: 5C06
- Original air date: November 7, 1997

Guest appearances
- Kristen Cloke as Lara Means; Christian Hoff as Matthew Prine; Steven Rankin as Sheriff John Cayce; Colleen Rennison as Jessica Cayce

Episode chronology
← Previous "The Curse of Frank Black"	Next → "The Hand of St. Sebastian"
- Millennium season 2

"'19:19" is the seventh episode of the second season of the American crime-thriller television series Millennium. It premiered on the Fox network on November 7, 1997. The episode was written by Glen Morgan and James Wong, and directed by Thomas J. Wright. "19:19" featured guest appearances by Kristen Cloke and Christian Hoff.

Millennium Group offender profiler Frank Black (Lance Henriksen) investigates the abduction of a bus full of schoolchildren, requiring the help of fellow Group members Peter Watts (Terry O'Quinn) and Lara Means (Cloke) as he tracks a man preparing for a third world war.

"19:19" featured several minor guest stars who would later return to the series, as well as the second appearance by recurring actor Cloke. The episode was viewed by approximately 5.98 million households in its initial broadcast, and received a mixed response from television critics.

== Plot ==
In Broken Bow, Oklahoma, Matthew Prine (Christian Hoff) intently watches several televisions simultaneously, scrawling his reactions across every inch of his floor. As he finishes writing, he experiences a vision of the future: nuclear war and its barren aftermath.

Later, Millennium Group investigators Frank Black (Lance Henriksen) and Peter Watts (Terry O'Quinn) probe the disappearance of a bus full of schoolchildren. They believe the driver was also a victim, and not responsible; they meet with the local sheriff, John Cayce (Steven Rankin), who has dredged the bus from a lake. It is empty, but inside Black experiences the same vision as Prine. He also finds paint transfer on the exterior, indicating the perpetrator was driving a white van. A false positive results as police apprehend storm chasers in a different van, who warn that a violent tornado is approaching.

Prine, who is behind the kidnapping, forces the children and driver into an underground bunker. He and his accomplice count the hostages, realizing that there is one less child than they had anticipated. Black and Cayce realize this too, and race to the home of the child who had not taken the bus that morning. They arrive in time to apprehend Prine as he attempts to snatch the child, taking him into custody.

Black believes Prine is not driven by malice; he and Watts use the resources of the Millennium Group to find his home, discovering the dense writings across his floors. They learn that Prine believes nuclear war is imminent, and took the children as he believes one of them is destined to bring world peace, wishing to protect this child when he learns which one it is destined to be. Black seeks aid from another Group member, Lara Means (Kristen Cloke), who is able to observe Prine's behavioral tells for clues when interviewing him. This, coupled with analysis of soil from his clothing, points to the children being held in an aluminum quarry.

The investigators rush to the quarry, where Prine's accomplice engages them in a firefight. However, the advancing tornado forces them to take cover; the tornado kills Prine and lifts the roof from the entombing bunker. It subsides as quickly as it arrived, and the children emerge safely from the wreckage. Black senses that Cayce's daughter may be the prophesied peacemaker. It turns out that the tornado destroyed the school where the children would have been if they weren't abducted, and that Prine had saved their lives.

== Production ==
"19:19" was written by frequent collaborators Glen Morgan and James Wong. The duo would pen a total of fifteen episodes throughout the series' run. The pair had also taken the roles of co-executive producers for the season. "19:19" was directed by Thomas J. Wright, who helmed a total of twenty-six episodes across all three seasons. Wright would also go on to direct "Millennium", the series' crossover episode with its sister show The X-Files.

The episode features the second appearance of Kristen Cloke as Millennium Group member Lara Means. Cloke had first portrayed the character in "Monster", and would last appear in the second-season finale "The Time Is Now". Several of the episode's minor guest stars would appear again later in the series. Bill Marchant, who portrayed Prine's accomplice, reappeared in an unrelated role in the third-season episode "Collateral Damage", while Kurt Evans, who played a sheriff's deputy, resurfaced in "Darwin's Eye", also in the third season.

== Broadcast and reception ==
"I ... wish that one of these episodes would eventually make every idea in its head come together, instead of seeming like a random collection of interesting facts and cool knowledge, like one of those old Reader’s Digest "fun facts" compendiums, assembled into TV episode form".

— The A.V. Club's Emily VanDerWerff

"19:19" was first broadcast on the Fox network on November 7, 1997. The episode earned a Nielsen rating of 6.1 during its original broadcast, meaning that 6.1 percent of households in the United States viewed the episode. This represented approximately 5.98 million households, and left the episode the eighty-fourth most-viewed broadcast that week. (Note: Each ratings point represented 980,000 households during the 1997–98 television season.)

The A.V. Club's Emily VanDerWerff rated the episode a "B", finding its final act to be powerful and entertaining. However, she believed that the episode suffered from a poor opening act, and was critical of what she saw as a poor performance by guest star Steven Rankin. Bill Gibron, writing for DVD Talk, rated the episode 3 out of 5, feeling that the episode's police procedural elements did not mesh well with its theological themes. Gibron felt that the plot's resolution was overly contrived, but praised the chemistry between the lead actors, highlighting Henriksen and Cloke in particular. Robert Shearman and Lars Pearson, in their book Wanting to Believe: A Critical Guide to The X-Files, Millennium & The Lone Gunmen, rated "19:19" three-and-a-half stars out of five. Shearman felt the episode was a successful blend of the investigative plot structure used in the first season with the themes of religious eschatology introduced in the second season; however, he believed that the plot "ran out of steam" by the final act, sacrificing engaging drama for accurate but dry psychology.

== Footnotes ==
=== References ===
- Shearman, Robert; Pearson, Lars (2009). Wanting to Believe: A Critical Guide to The X-Files, Millennium & The Lone Gunmen. Mad Norwegian Press. ISBN 978-0975944691.
