= The Curse of Frank Black =

- Millennium episode
- Episode no.: Season 2 Episode 6
- Directed by: Ralph Hemecker
- Written by: Glen Morgan; James Wong
- Original air date: October 31, 1997
- Running time: 43 minutes

Guest appearances
- Dean Winters as Mr Crocell; A. J. Adamson as 5-year-old Frank; Lachlan Murdoch as Hobo; Kett Turton as Ghost Storyteller; Shaun Toplass as 14-year-old Frank

Episode chronology
← Previous "A Single Blade of Grass"	Next → "19:19"
- Millennium season 2

"The Curse of Frank Black" is the sixth episode of the second season of the crime-thriller television series Millennium. It premiered on the Fox network in the United States on October 31, 1997. The episode was written by Glen Morgan and James Wong, and directed by Ralph Hemecker. "The Curse of Frank Black" featured a guest appearance from Dean Winters.

Millennium centers on offender profiler Frank Black (Lance Henriksen), who investigates unusual crimes as part of the private investigative organisation the Millennium Group. In this episode, Black tries to spend Halloween with his daughter, but is continually reminded of a figure from his past.

"The Curse of Frank Black", which was inspired by the 1964 Japanese horror film Kwaidan, has received positive reviews from critics, with its minimalist plot being seen as its main strength.

== Plot ==
On Halloween, Millennium Group consultant Frank Black (Lance Henriksen) is carving a jack-o'-lantern while preparing to take his daughter Jordan (Brittany Tiplady) trick-or-treating. As he leaves to collect her, Black notices a demonic figure watching him from across the street.

That night, Jordan deliberately passes by one house, telling Black that it is haunted. Black tells her there are no such thing as ghosts but is reminded of a moment from his past. In a flashback, a five-year-old Black is dared by his friends to knock the door of the same house; a man named Crocell (Dean Winters) answers and invites Black inside. Crocell, a World War II veteran, explains the meaning of Halloween to Black, telling him that it is the one night of the year that ghosts walk among the living. Crocell hopes that it is his chance to commune with the friends he lost in the war and is dismayed when the young Black dismisses the possibility of ghosts.

After bringing Jordan back to her mother, Catherine (Megan Gallagher), Black notices several youths egging a house—the house he once shared with his family, and in which his friend Bob Bletcher was killed. Black goes inside and overhears several teenagers gathered in the basement trying to scare each other with the story of Bletcher's murder. Black interrupts, scaring off the youths—and is again reminded of his past, recalling his reaction when Crocell was found to have committed suicide. As Black leaves the house, he picks up an egg carton discarded by the fleeing teenagers and throws the remaining eggs at the walls.

When Black arrives home, he leafs through the day's mail, finally noticing that the numbers "268" and the letters "ACTS" have been appearing to him throughout the day. Black takes these coincidences to be pointing him towards a Bible verse, Acts 26:8—"why should it be thought incredible by you that God raises the dead?" Black then hears something moving in his attic and investigates.

Black discovers Crocell's ghost, who claims to have been sent back to warn Black that he should abandon his work with the Millennium Group and return to live with his wife and child instead. Crocell warns that Black will end up as lonely as he did, but when Black dismisses this, the spirit vanishes. The following day, Black returns to his old house to clean up where it was egged. As he does so, he momentarily glimpses the same demonic figure as the day before, but he ignores it and continues his work.

== Production ==
"The Curse of Frank Black" was written by frequent collaborators Glen Morgan and James Wong, and directed by Ralph Hemecker. Hemecker had previously helmed the first season episode "The Well-Worn Lock", and a further three in the third season. He would return for the third season episode "Exegesis". Morgan and Wong had previously collaborated to write several episodes of the first season. The duo would go on to pen a number of episodes over the course of the second season, having taken the roles of co-executive producers for the season.

Morgan and Wong's script for the episode was influenced by the 1964 Japanese horror film Kwaidan and features very little dialogue. Morgan felt that Henriksen was the right actor for such a script, describing him as "so great with looks". Morgan also credited Hemecker with "a lot of the episode's tone", finding the director's work to have been "beautiful".

Morgan and Wong planned another two holiday specials, one for Easter and one for Christmas, but only the latter was made as "Midnight of the Century".

== Broadcast and reception ==
"The Curse of Frank Black" was first broadcast on the Fox network in the United States on October 31, 1997. The episode earned a Nielsen rating of 5.7 during its original broadcast, meaning that 5.7 percent of households in the United States viewed the episode. This represented approximately 5.59 million households, and left the episode the eighty-fourth most-viewed broadcast that week. (Note: Each ratings point represented 980,000 households during the 1997–98 television season.)

The episode received positive reviews from critics. The A.V. Club's Zack Handlen rated the episode an A, calling it "the best episode of Millennium yet, by a long chalk". Handlen felt that the episode effectively scaled the series' grandiose apocalyptic tone down to one man's struggle, making both the series and Frank Black more understandable to viewers. Bill Gibron, writing for DVD Talk, rated the episode 4 out of 5, "moody, bamboozling" and "truly creepy". Gibron also felt that the episode's structure, based on "hidden hints and secret connections", foreshadowed Morgan and Wong's later work on the film Final Destination. Robert Shearman and Lars Pearson, in their book Wanting to Believe: A Critical Guide to The X-Files, Millennium & The Lone Gunmen, rated "The Curse of Frank Black" five stars out of five, feeling that "it's simple, and it's brave, and it's curiously moving". Shearman felt that the episode's minimalism—its paucity of dialogue and music—was key to its tone, and praised Henriksen's expressiveness for helping to shape this.
