= Monster (Millennium) =

- Millennium episode
- Episode no.: Season 2 Episode 4
- Directed by: Perry Lang
- Written by: Glen Morgan; James Wong
- Production code: 5C04
- Original air date: October 17, 1997
- Running time: 43 minutes

Guest appearances
- Kristen Cloke as Lara Means; Mary Gillis as Penny Plott; Robert Wisden as Gordon Roberts; Lauren Diewold as Danielle Barbakow; Chris Owens as Deputy Bill Sherman; Gillian Barber as Mrs. Barbakow; Fred Keating as Mr. Barbakow

Episode chronology
← Previous "Sense and Antisense"	Next → "A Single Blade of Grass"
- Millennium season 2

"'Monster" is the fourth episode of the second season of the American crime-thriller television series Millennium. It premiered on the Fox network in the United States on October 17, 1997. The episode was written by Glen Morgan and James Wong and directed by Perry Lang. "Monster" featured guest appearances from Kristen Cloke, Robert Wisden and Chris Owens.

In the episode, Millennium Group profiler Frank Black (Lance Henriksen) travels to Arkansas to investigate allegations of child abuse in the community, meeting fellow Group member Lara Means (Cloke). They soon discover that the abuse may actually be the work of another child.

"Monster" introduces the recurring character Lara Means, who would appear throughout the second season. The episode also features music by Bobby Darin, a hallmark of Morgan and Wong's work. The episode has been well received by critics, and earned guest star Lauren Diewold a nomination at the 1998 Young Artist Awards.

== Plot ==
Millennium Group consultant Frank Black (Lance Henriksen) travels to Springdale, Arkansas, to investigate allegations of child abuse brought against a daycare owner, Penny Plott (Mary Gillis). Before he leaves Seattle, he takes his daughter Jordan (Brittany Tiplady) shopping for shoes but chastises her when she begins acting out for attention.

In Arkansas, sheriff's deputy Bill Sherman (Chris Owens) discovers bite marks on his son's skin after he returns home from the daycare. When his son refuses to discuss what happened, Sherman is convinced of the rumors about Plott. Black arrives in town and pretends to be a local parent interested in using the daycare. His visit is interrupted by Lara Means (Kristen Cloke), who is investigating for Plott's defense. However, the two are forced to work together when one boy, Jason Wells, stops breathing. Despite attempts to revive him, the boy dies.

Meanwhile, in Seattle, Black's wife Catherine (Megan Gallagher) takes Jordan to the dentist after she spits blood while brushing her teeth. The dentist tells her such an injury is most commonly caused by blunt force trauma. Catherine dismisses the idea, but Jordan mentions Black losing his temper during the shopping trip.

An autopsy reveals Wells' death was the result of an asthma attack. However, the ambitious district attorney, Gordon Roberts (Robert Wisden) believes Plott is somehow responsible. The investigation stalls until another child, Danielle Barbakow (Lauren Diewold), mentions overhearing Wells being abused by Plott. Plott is arrested by Sherman, whom she reprimands sternly, reminding him that she looked after him as a child too, and has never been accused of anything in three decades of childcare work. Sherman sees she is incapable of what she has been accused of and continues to send his son to the daycare, but other parents protest, picket and vandalize the premises.

Black and Means discover that they have both been sent to investigate by the Group, realizing that this is some kind of test for them. They both come to believe that Barkabow, from whom Black senses a demonic presence, is responsible for Wells' death and visit her home. Means speaks to Barkabow's mother while Black interviews the child. As they speak, Barkabow begins screaming and accuses Black of harming her; after he leaves the room she hits herself in the face and breaks her jaw. This leads Roberts, who learns that Black is under suspicion of harming Jordan, to arrest him for assault.

Means has ultraviolet photographs taken of Barkabow's injuries and deduces that the girl was injured with an angel statue from her room. Means realizes that Black could not have wielded this statue, and Barkabow's mother admits to having heard her daughter hit herself. Black is released, and the abuse investigation against him is dropped when Catherine defends him. Lara and Black return to Seattle, while Barbakow is adopted by a family of the Millennium Group.

== Production ==
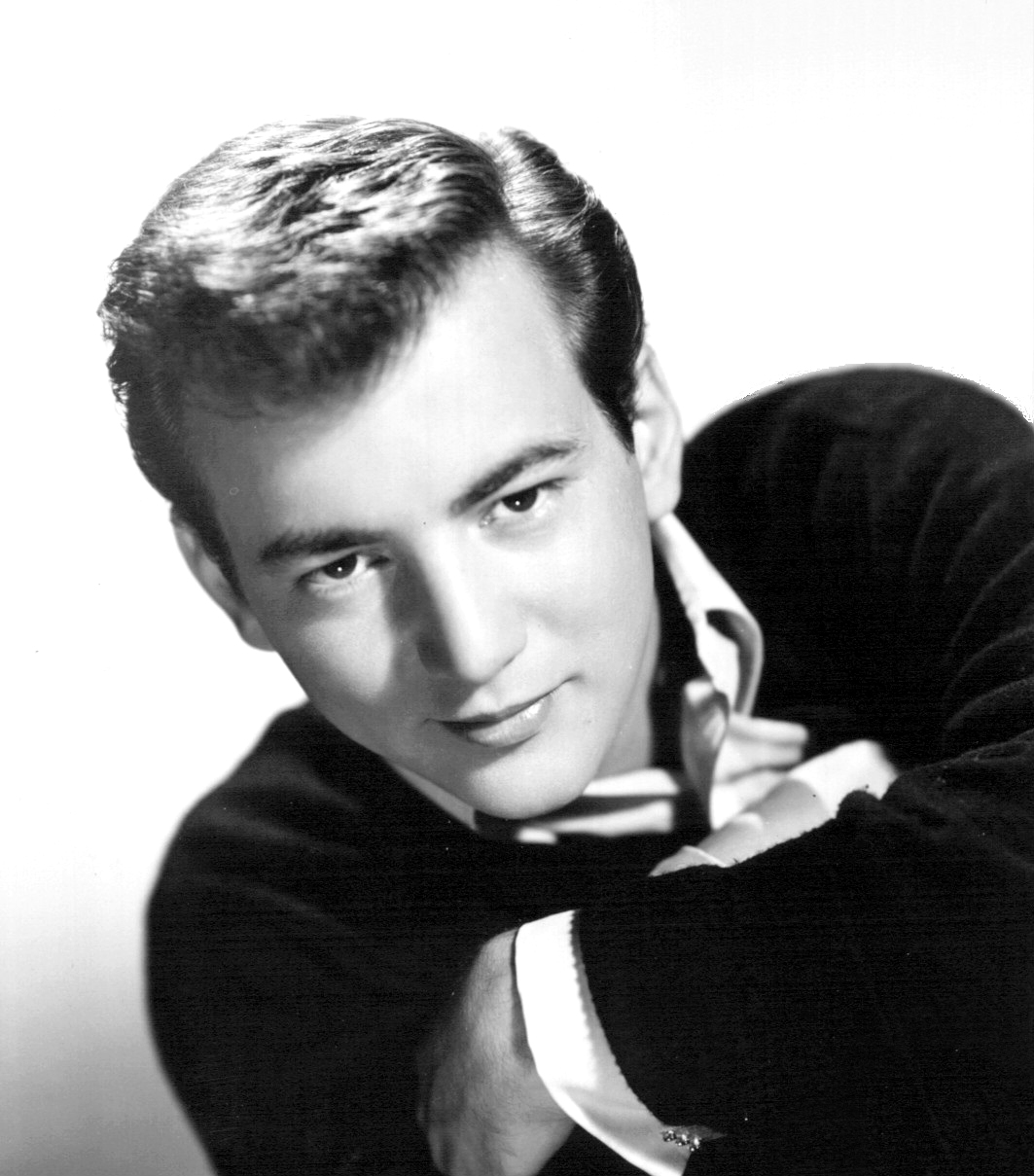
"Monster" features music by Bobby Darin.

"Monster" was written by frequent collaborators Glen Morgan and James Wong, and directed by Perry Lang. The episode was the sixth to have been written by Morgan and Wong, after the duo had penned "Dead Letters", "522666" and "The Thin White Line" in the first season, and "The Beginning and the End" and "Beware of the Dog" in the second. The pair would go on to script a further nine episodes over the course of the second season, having taken the roles of co-executive producers for the season. "Monster" saw director Lang's only contribution to Millennium.

The episode makes use of Bobby Darin's song "Goodbye Charlie" in a diegetic manner; the song would also be put to use in the later second season episode "Goodbye Charlie". Darin's music has been noted by Millennium's resident composer Mark Snow as a hallmark of the works of Morgan and Wong, and would also appear in the episodes "Beware of the Dog" and "Sense and Antisense". "Monster" opens with a quote from William Shakespeare's Henry VI, Part 2—"First thing we do, let's kill all the lawyers".

"Monster" marked Kristen Cloke's first appearance in the series as Millennium Group member Lara Means. Cloke would make several further appearances as the character, with the last of these being the second season finale "The Time Is Now". Guest stars Robert Wisden and Chris Owens both appeared in Millennium's sister show The X-Files—Owens first appeared in the Morgan and Wong-penned "Musings of a Cigarette Smoking Man", before taking on the recurring role of Jeffrey Spender in that series' fifth season; while Wisden appeared in "Pusher". Wisden would also reappear in Millennium's third season, acting in an unrelated role in "TEOTWAWKI".

== Broadcast and reception ==
"Monster" was first broadcast on the Fox network in the United States on October 17, 1997. The episode earned a Nielsen rating of 6 during its original broadcast, meaning that 6 percent of households in the United States viewed the episode. This represented approximately 5.88 million households, and left the episode the seventy-second most-viewed broadcast that week. (Note: Each ratings point represented 980,000 households during the 1997–1998 television season.) Guest star Lauren Diewold received a nomination for Best Performance in a TV Drama Series – Guest Starring Young Actress at the 1998 Young Artist Awards for her role in "Monster", losing out to Cara Rose for Touched by an Angel.

The episode received positive reviews from critics. The A.V. Club's Zack Handlen rated the episode B+, finding that it has "impressive ambition" but "doesn't really work". Handlen found the episode "immensely fun to watch", and was pleased that the series had departed from the sexually motivated serial killings of past episodes; however, he felt that the plot was "muddled" and found Black's personal involvement in the case to be unnecessary. Bill Gibron, writing for DVD Talk, rated the episode 4.5 out of 5, calling Cloke "an amazing addition to the series". Gibron also felt positively about the increasingly plot-driven nature of the series, describing Morgan and Wong's developments as a "complex, completely innovative mythology". Robert Shearman and Lars Pearson, in their book Wanting to Believe: A Critical Guide to The X-Files, Millennium & The Lone Gunmen, rated "Monster" four stars out of five, describing it as "a brave story well told". Shearman praised Diewold's guest appearance, and felt that the introduction of Lara Means was a positive addition, although it caused the character of Catherine to seem increasingly needless.

== Footnotes ==
=== References ===
- Chris Carter, John Peter Kousakis, Lance Henriksen, Michael R. Perry, Ken Horton, Thomas J. Wright, Mark Snow, Chip Johannessen, Kristen Cloke, Megan Gallagher, Frank Spotnitz, Mark Freeborn (2004). The Turn of the Tide: The Making of Season 2 (DVD). Millennium: The Complete Second Season: 20th Century Fox Home Entertainment.
- Meisler, Andy (1999). Resist or Serve: The Official Guide to The X-Files. Vol. 4. London: HarperCollins. ISBN 978-0-00-257133-3.
- Shearman, Robert; Pearson, Lars (2009). Wanting to Believe: A Critical Guide to The X-Files, Millennium & The Lone Gunmen. Mad Norwegian Press. ISBN 978-0975944691.
