= Sacrament (Millennium) =

- Millennium episode
- Episode no.: Season 1 Episode 15
- Directed by: Michael W. Watkins
- Written by: Frank Spotnitz
- Production code: 4C14
- Original air date: February 21, 1997

Guest appearances
- Philip Anglim as Tom Black; Dylan Haggerty as Richard Green; Brian Markinson as Det. Teeple; Lorena Gale as Dr. Patricia Moss; French Tickner as Store Clerk; Ken Roberts as Mr. Green; Liz Bryson as Helen Black; Daphne Goldrick as Mrs. Green

Episode chronology
← Previous "The Thin White Line"	Next → "Covenant"
- Millennium season 1

"'Sacrament" is the fifteenth episode of the first season of the American crime-thriller television series Millennium. It premiered on the Fox network on February 21, 1997. The episode was written by Frank Spotnitz, and directed by Michael W. Watkins. "Sacrament" featured guest appearances by Philip Anglim, Dylan Haggerty and Brian Markinson.

Millennium Group consultant Frank Black (Lance Henriksen) faces difficulty when his sister-in-law is abducted after her son's baptism. Meanwhile, Black's daughter Jordan begins to show signs of experiencing the same seemingly-psychic visions that have plagued him.

Spotnitz's script for "Sacrament", which he has called his favourite of those written for Millennium, draws inspiration from real life serial killers John Wayne Gacy and Dennis Nilsen. The episode has received mostly positive reviews from critics, and was viewed by approximately 6.81 million households during its original broadcast.

== Plot ==
Millennium Group consultant Frank Black (Lance Henriksen) joins his brother Tom (Philip Anglim) and sister-in-law Helen (Liz Bryson) for their newborn son's christening. After the child is baptized, Black joins his daughter Jordan (Brittany Tiplady), finding her in hysterics. She claims to have seen a man hurting Helen; when Black and his brother rush outside, they find the baby in the back of Tom's car, but Helen is gone.

Black's contact in the Seattle Police Department, Bob Bletcher (Bill Smitrovich), insists that Black should not get involved in the case as he is too close to the victims. However, Black insists he can be of assistance, and reviews security footage of a stranger investigating Tom's luggage after their flight. Bletcher reports that a stolen car has been found abandoned, with Helen's blood inside. Fellow Millennium Group member Peter Watts (Terry O'Quinn) helps Black identify the kidnapper from a set of pictures of sex offenders from the Seattle area—Black recognizes Richard Green (Dylan Haggerty) as the man from the airport footage.

Tom later searches Black's office, stealing his gun and finding Green's name and address. Tom confronts Green at his home, demanding to know where his wife is. The police, who have been watching Green's house, intervene and take Tom home before anyone is harmed. Black apologizes for keeping information from Tom but warns him that his outburst is exactly why he did so. Meanwhile, Watts traces forensic evidence from the abandoned car to a cabin in the woods; blood found there matches both Green and Helen, and Helen's wedding ring is found.

Meanwhile, a mysteriously ill Jordan continues to ask about Helen's whereabouts, and her remarks about Helen's condition lead Black to believe she is starting to experience the seemingly psychic visions he is capable of seeing. Elsewhere, Green is arrested. His property is searched but Helen is nowhere to be found—although another corpse is dug up in the garden, evidently killed nine years before. Black deduces that Green could not have killed Helen at the cabin, as his house was already being watched by the police. He sees a set of tools in Green's home which he realizes were not used for murder or torture, but to immure Helen in the basement. Black and the police dismantle a newly finished plaster wall, finding Helen injured but alive; Black realizes Green was simply a pawn, used by his father to lure victims to the house.

== Production ==
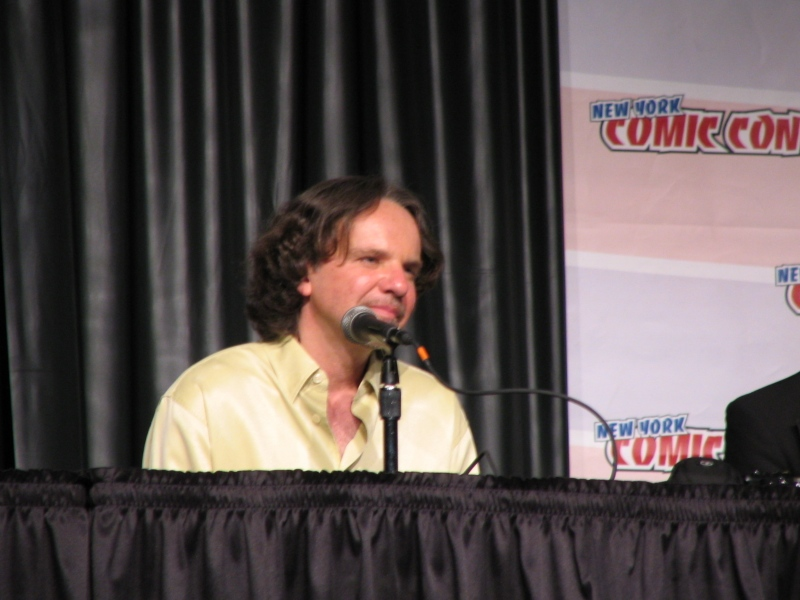
Writer Frank Spotnitz has called "Sacrament" his favourite Millennium script.

"Sacrament" was written by Frank Spotnitz and directed by Michael W. Watkins. Spotnitz had previously written "Weeds" earlier in the first season, as well as penning "TEOTWAWKI", "Antipas" and "Seven and One" in the series' third season. Spotnitz was a prolific writer for Millennium's sister show The X-Files, receiving his first writing credit for that series for the episode "End Game". Spotnitz has described "Sacrament" as his favourite script for the series, finding the character of Richard Green to be "creepy" and believing that "the solution to the mystery [was] sufficiently unexpected".

"Sacrament" is the only episode of Millennium to have been directed by Watkins. Watkins' work on the episode led to him becoming a director and executive producer for The X-Files when that series moved production to Los Angeles. The episode features the last appearance in the series by Brian Markinson as Seattle police officer Teeple; Markinson had previously portrayed the character in the earlier first season episodes "The Judge" and "Blood Relatives".

The treatment of the two victims seen in "Sacrament"—the immurement of Helen Black and the burial in the garden of the unidentified second victim—appear to have been based on the methods used by real life serial killers John Wayne Gacy, Dennis Nilsen and Dorothea Puente to dispose of their victims. Both Gacy and Nilsen habitually murdered men they had taken home as lovers, with Gacy storing bodies in the crawl space of his home, and Nilsen keeping corpses in wardrobes and under the floorboards. Puente would kill her tenants for their money and bury their bodies in the gardens of the properties they were renting.

== Broadcast and reception ==
"Sacrament" was first broadcast on the Fox Network on February 21, 1997. The episode earned a Nielsen rating of 6.4 during its original broadcast, meaning that 6.4 percent of households in the United States viewed the episode. This represented approximately 6.81 million households, and left the episode the seventy-seventh most-viewed broadcast that week. (Note: Each ratings point represented 970,000 households during the 1996–1997 television season.)

The episode received mostly positive reviews from critics. The A.V. Club's Zack Handlen rated the episode an A−, noting that it "subvert[s] our expectations" when dealing with the fallibility of a protagonist. Handlen felt that the episode's plot was somewhat inevitable following the introduction of Black's family, but that it was handled well; he also felt positively about the episode's symbolism of the vulnerability of innocence. Bill Gibron, writing for DVD Talk, rated the episode 5 out of 5, calling it "Millennium at its best". Gibron felt that "Sacrament" was "a taut, well-executed thriller" whose events "unfold with logic and authenticity". Robert Shearman and Lars Pearson, in their book Wanting to Believe: A Critical Guide to The X-Files, Millennium & The Lone Gunmen, rated "Sacrament" three stars out of five. Shearman felt that the plot was "a bit humdrum", finding that some emotional development was simply treated as "padding"; however, he praised guest star Philip Anglim for his performance.

== Footnotes ==
=== References ===
- Genge, N. E. (1997). Millennium: The Unofficial Companion Volume Two. Century. ISBN 0712678697.
- Gibson, Dirk Cameron (2006). Serial Murder And Media Circuses. Greenwood Publishing Group. ISBN 0275990648.
- Shearman, Robert; Pearson, Lars (2009). Wanting to Believe: A Critical Guide to The X-Files, Millennium & The Lone Gunmen. Mad Norwegian Press. ISBN 978-0975944691.
- Sullivan, Terry; Maiken, Peter T. (2000). Killer Clown: The John Wayne Gacy Murders. Pinnacle. ISBN 0-7860-1422-9.
- Wilson, Colin; Seaman, Donald (2011). The Serial Killers: A Study in the Psychology of Violence. Random House. ISBN 978-0753547229.
