= The Mikado (Millennium) =

- Millennium episode
- Episode no.: Season 2 Episode 13
- Directed by: Roderick J. Pridy
- Written by: Michael R. Perry
- Production code: 5C13
- Original air date: February 6, 1998

Guest appearances
- Allan Zinyk as Brian Roedecker; Greg Michaels as Captain Bachman; Gillian Carfra as The Web Girl; Micah Gardener as Brandon; Tony Sampson as Anthony; Justin Wong as Danny; Rachel Hayward as Angela; Eileen Pedde as Pain Victim

Episode chronology
← Previous "Luminary"	Next → "The Pest House"
- Millennium season 2

"'The Mikado" is the thirteenth episode of the second season of the American crime-thriller television series Millennium. It premiered on the Fox network on February 6, 1998. The episode was written by Michael R. Perry and directed Roderick J. Pridy. "The Mikado" featured a guest appearance by Allan Zinyk as Brian Roedecker.

After a group of boys witness a murder via a live webcam feed, Millennium Group profiler Frank Black (Lance Henriksen) realizes that the culprit is an old adversary who has learned to exploit the internet to continue his killing spree while avoiding capture.

Perry was inspired to write the episode after considering the "dark side" of the internet, drawing influence from Jennifer Ringley's JenniCam website. Avatar, the episode's antagonist, was based on real-life murderer the Zodiac Killer. "The Mikado" was seen by over five million households in its initial broadcast, and has received positive reviews from critics.

== Plot ==
A group of friends browse the Internet for pornography, finding a live feed of a woman bound to a chair. Behind her, a number is painted on the wall; when the feed's web counter reaches the painted number, a masked man appears and cuts the girl's throat. The boys quickly print an image of the feed as proof of what they have seen just before the website disappears.

Millennium Group consultant Frank Black (Lance Henriksen) finds that police across the United States have received calls from witnesses to the killing. Police believe it to be a hoax, but Black is convinced of its authenticity. He and fellow Group members Peter Watts (Terry O'Quinn) and Brian Roedecker (Allan Zinyk) identify the victim as Rebecca Damsen. Damsen's email correspondence leads them to a San Jose address; Watts finds the bodies of both the owner and Damsen in a nearby graveyard. By the bodies is another number, which they determine to be an IP address.

The IP address leads to another live feed, only this time the chair is empty. There is another number painted on the wall, which Black recognizes as a case file number from his time in the FBI—the case concerned Avatar, a serial killer who was able to evade all attempts at capture. Avatar sends Black a coded message twice and places a woman in the chair on the feed, keeping her face hidden. Roedecker realizes that, through image differencing, the two messages contain additional information—a sound clip from The Mikado, known to be Avatar's favorite operetta.

Black determines that another set of numbers visible on the feed are latitude and longitude coordinates for San Francisco. The San Francisco police are uncooperative, however. After Black, Watts and Roedecker attempt to keep the feed counter from rising by recreating the live feed and substituting it, the second girl is murdered before the feed's counter reaches the allotted number. Avatar leaves another clue after the killing, which leads to two further video feeds—one shows a third set like the others, again with an empty chair, while the other shows the exterior of a mobile home. Police locate the mobile home, but an officer is killed by a booby trap before the trailer is destroyed by a series of explosions.

Black travels to San Francisco, finding an abandoned theater whose marquee is displaying The Mikado. He is shot at by a masked gunman and gives chase; however, he soon sees that the attacker is another kidnap victim, a gun tied to her arm in an attempt to trick Black into shooting her. Watts tells Black that they found a charred body in the remains of the trailer, but Black tells him it is just another victim, and Avatar will most likely fall silent again—for a while.

== Production ==
"The Mikado" is the first episode of Millennium to have been written by Michael R. Perry, who would go on to pen a further four episodes in the third season. The episode is the final one helmed by director Roderick J. Pridy, who had also taken the reins on "Covenant" in the first season.

Perry was inspired to write the episode upon wondering whether the internet, about which he had only heard positive remarks, had a "dark side". He was shown Jennifer Ringley's JenniCam website, which provided a constant webcam view of her daily life, and wondered what sort of investigations would arise if a murder were witnessed on a similar broadcast. The other main inspiration for the episode was the real-life Zodiac Killer, who formed the basis for the fictional Avatar. Perry's script was later given a "polish" by executive producer James Wong, with Perry stating that roughly ninety percent of the material is his own work. Several women in the episode, including possible murder victims investigated by Black and Roedecker, are named after Perry's sisters.

After principal photography had finished for the episode, additional inserts were shot to add more variety to scenes featuring a lot of dialogue; Perry noted that this was something he had learned about from Wong and felt the technique was put to "great use". Filming several of the episode's scenes, including the webcam feeds and footage Black watches of police officers investigating suspects was filmed in a deliberately low-resolution manner, on handheld cameras, as Perry felt footage that was too clean and high-quality would lessen the episode's tension, citing The Blair Witch Project as an example of how this approach has later been put to use. "The Mikado" featured Allan Zinyk's last appearance as Group member Brian Roedecker. Wong and fellow executive producer Glen Morgan wanted to sign Zinyk on for further appearances, but actor declined in order to pursue a career in the theatre in Toronto.

== Broadcast and reception ==
"The Mikado" was first broadcast on the Fox Network on February 6, 1998. The episode earned a Nielsen rating of 5.4 during its original broadcast, meaning that 5.4 percent of households in the United States viewed the episode. This represented approximately 5.29 million households, and left the episode the seventy-eighth most-viewed broadcast that week. (Note: Each ratings point represented 980,000 households during the 1997–1998 television season.)

The episode received positive reviews from critics. The A.V. Club's Emily VanDerWerff rated the episode an A−, calling it "one of the strongest episodes of the season". VanDerWerff felt that the episode accurately depicted the general unease about the growing role of the internet in the late 1990s; she also reflected that it follows the "serial killer of the week" formula of the series' first season while retaining the second season's "more mystical, supernatural bent". Bill Gibron, writing for DVD Talk, rated the episode 4 out of 5, calling it "very compelling". Gibron compared the episode to the films Seven and 8mm; he also felt that the unresolved plot helped to temper concerns about Black's seeming infallibility. Robert Shearman and Lars Pearson, in their book Wanting to Believe: A Critical Guide to The X-Files, Millennium & The Lone Gunmen, rated "The Mikado" three-and-a-half stars out of five. Shearman felt that although the episode's details seem dated, its verisimilitude and enthusiasm helps to overcome this; he noted that the episode "turns us all into spectators, and turns death into performance art".

== Footnotes ==
=== References ===
- Perry, Michael R. (2004). "Audio commentary for "The Mikado"". Millennium: The Complete Second Season (DVD). 20th Century Fox Home Entertainment.
- Shearman, Robert; Pearson, Lars (2009). Wanting to Believe: A Critical Guide to The X-Files, Millennium & The Lone Gunmen. Mad Norwegian Press. ISBN 978-0975944691.
