= A Single Blade of Grass =

- Millennium episode
- Episode no.: Season 2 Episode 5
- Directed by: Rodman Flender
- Written by: Kay Reindl; Erin Maher
- Production code: 5C05
- Original air date: October 24, 1997
- Running time: 42:00

Guest appearances
- Amy Steel as Dr. Liz Michael; Michael Greyeyes as Joe Reynard; Floyd Red Crow Westerman as Old Indian; Garry Chalk as Richard Powell

Episode chronology
← Previous "Monster"	Next → "The Curse of Frank Black"
- Millennium season 2

"A Single Blade of Grass" is the fifth episode of the second season of the American crime-thriller television series Millennium. It premiered on the Fox network on October 24, 1997. The episode was written by Kay Reindl and Erin Maher, and directed by Rodman Flender. "A Single Blade of Grass" featured guest appearances by Floyd Red Crow Westerman and Michael Greyeyes.

Millennium centers on offender profiler Frank Black (Lance Henriksen), who investigates unusual crimes as part of the private investigative organisation the Millennium Group. In this episode, Black investigates the murder of a Native American man, finding a cult who wish to bring about the end of American civilization.

"A Single Blade of Grass" was the first episode of the series to have been penned by Reindl and Maher. It received mixed responses from critics, and was viewed by approximately 6.57 million households upon its initial broadcast.

== Plot ==
In New York City, a young Native American man is forced by several others to ingest snake venom. The venom causes him to hallucinate, and one of the men, Joe Reynard (Michael Greyeyes) asks him to describe his visions. However, the poisoned man screams in agony and dies. His body is later found when a construction site is being excavated by archaeologists. A mummified body from centuries earlier is also found.

When Millennium Group consultant Frank Black (Lance Henriksen) arrives to investigate, he notices similarities between both corpses. The archaeologist in charge of the dig, Liz Michaels (Amy Steel), is adamant that the site should stay intact for further excavation, but foreman Richard Powell (Garry Chalk) and his mostly Native American crew insist the construction project must continue.

Black believes the killing took place in a hotel basement; finding the crime scene, he consults Michaels, who notes that symbols painted on the walls come from several different indigenous cultures but all concern communication with the spirit world. Black visits a bar frequented by the construction workers and their elderly mentor (Floyd Red Crow Westerman). Reynard is among their number; Black asks him about one of the symbols and is told by the old man that the symbol is an ominous warning. After Black leaves, Reynard tells the others that he "is the one."

An autopsy reveals that the victim's corpse had been dismembered and reconstructed. Michaels notes that this is a Seneca ritual aimed at reviving the dead to learn of spiritual matters. Later, Black and Michaels are called the construction site, where Powell is attempting to package and remove the ancient remains. Reynard and Powell begin fighting; the latter soon dies of a heart attack.

When Black returns to his car, he finds a native face mask placed inside. Michaels explains that it represents the ability to cross from the material world into the spirit world. Black believes a secret indigenous tribe is awaiting the collapse of the white settlers' civilization, theorizing that they believe his abilities are key to their prophecies of the apocalypse.

That night, Black is kidnapped by Reynard's tribe. He is taken to the sewers and forced to consume snake venom; he sees visions, but insists they are from his psychic gift rather than from the venom. He predicts that the native tribes will reunite and that the buffalo will return to New York. However, he is soon rescued by Michaels and a group of police, who place Reynard and his tribe under arrest. As the tribe—now reunited in police custody—are led away, a travelling rodeo loses track of four buffalo, which run free through the city streets.

== Production ==
"A Single Blade of Grass" is the first episode of Millennium to have been written by Kay Reindl and Erin Maher; the pair would pen two further episodes in the second season, and another in the third season. The episode was the only contribution to the series by director Rodman Flender.

The episode featured the return of Black's near-psychic visions; a phenomenon which had been used with much less frequency in the second season. Executive producer Glen Morgan begrudgingly allowed Maher and Reindl to show the ability in this episode, saying "I felt last year those visions were a cheat. The camera would go to a coffee cup and Frank would say, 'The murderer used a coffee cup.' It drove me nuts. What we were trying to do this year was elevate Frank's visions to a dream-like state, so he would have to interpret what he's seeing. There would be more mystical, symbolic imagery that might give him more of a sense of what's going on. I had wanted to strip away the gift for a long time and see if the show really played without it. But we got back into that".

== Broadcast and reception ==
"A Single Blade of Grass" was first broadcast on the Fox network on October 24, 1997. The episode earned a Nielsen rating of 6.7 during its original broadcast, meaning that 6.7 percent of households in the United States viewed the episode. This represented approximately 6.57 million households, and left the episode the sixty-seventh most-viewed broadcast that week. (Note: Each ratings point represented 980,000 households during the 1987–98 television season.)

"A Single Blade of Grass" received mixed reviews from critics. The A.V. Club's Emily VanDerWerff rated the episode a A−, calling it "yet another adventure in weird, Native American mysticism from the folks at 1013 Productions". VanDerWerff felt that although the episode contained several plot holes, it worked with "a kind of dream sense, following its own weird, nightmare logic". Bill Gibron, writing for DVD Talk, rated the episode 3.5 out of 5. Gibron found that the episode contained several overly-unbelievable moments but was overall "another great episode, even with some rather minor flaws". Robert Shearman and Lars Pearson, in their book Wanting to Believe: A Critical Guide to The X-Files, Millennium & The Lone Gunmen, rated "A Single Blade of Grass" one star out of five. Shearman felt that the episode was "tedious", citing a lack of any real action and a "banal" ending which he described as having been poorly foreshadowed. However, Shearman felt positively about the episode's attempt to stand on its own rather than imitating sister show The X-Files, which he saw several prior episodes as having done.

== Footnotes ==
=== References ===
- Shearman, Robert; Pearson, Lars (2009). Wanting to Believe: A Critical Guide to The X-Files, Millennium & The Lone Gunmen. Mad Norwegian Press. ISBN 978-0975944691.
