= A Room with No View =

- Millennium episode
- Episode no.: Season 2 Episode 20
- Directed by: Thomas J. Wright
- Written by: Ken Horton
- Production code: 5C20
- Original air date: April 24, 1998

Guest appearances
- Christopher Kennedy Masterson as Landon Bryce; Chad Todhunter as Ben; Mariangela Pino as Teresa; Timothy Webber as Mr. Bryce; Sarah-Jane Redmond as Lucy Butler

Episode chronology
← Previous "Anamnesis"	Next → "Somehow, Satan Got Behind Me"
- Millennium season 2

"'A Room with No View" is the twentieth episode of the second season of the American crime-thriller television series Millennium. It premiered on the Fox network on April 24, 1998. The episode was written by Ken Horton, and directed by Thomas J. Wright. "A Room With No View" featured an appearance by recurring guest star Sarah-Jane Redmond.

Millennium Group member Frank Black (Lance Henriksen) learns that a figure from his past has been abducting students, seemingly in an attempt to quash their hopes and aspirations. The episode was Horton's first script for the series, and saw the return of villain Lucy Butler (Redmond), who appeared sporadically throughout the series. "A Room With No View" received positive feedback from television critics, and was viewed by approximately 4.7 million households in its initial broadcast.

== Plot ==
A young man tunnels out of a farmhouse in Oregon City, Oregon, escaping into the night. He finds an abandoned car and attempts to hot-wire it; someone inside starts the engine and runs him off the road, injuring his ankle. A woman, face obscured, and her male accomplice exit the car and throw the man into its trunk.

In Seattle, two friends argue about applying for college. Landon Bryce (Christopher Kennedy Masterson) tells his friend Howard Gordon (Michael R. Coleman) to apply, but Gordon has been convinced by school counselor Teresa Roe (Mariangela Pino) that his progress is too mediocre to make it worthwhile. Bryce accosts Roe, calling her a failure. That night, Gordon is killed and Bryce is kidnapped.

Millennium Group profiler Frank Black (Lance Henriksen) learns that Gordon died of a heart attack, which the coroner believes was caused by fear. Black visits the crime scene and sees visions of Lucy Butler (Sarah-Jane Redmond), the woman who killed his friend and colleague Bob Bletcher. Meanwhile, Bryce is bound and gagged in a remote farmhouse, then left in a room with the would-be escapee. The woman from earlier tells Bryce she loves him.

Black speaks to fellow Group member Peter Watts (Terry O'Quinn) about his vision of Butler. Watts informs Black that another Group member, Olson, has been tasked with monitoring Butler since her release. Watts and Black travel to Butler's last known address and find Olson's long-dead body. They realize Butler had been filing her own surveillance reports in Olson's name. Meanwhile, Bryce attempts to escape, but is subdued and later comforted by Butler. Black interviews Roe, suspecting her involvement when she continually refers to Bryce in the past tense. He later discovers that in every school she has worked for, students have been kidnapped; all the victims resembled Bryce in being average students who showed signs of promise.

Bryce learns about the tunnel from his cellmate, and the two escape again. Emerging from the tunnel, they are met by Butler and a dog that attacks Bryce. After being brought back to the farmhouse, Bryce is told to accept that he is mediocre and ordinary. Elsewhere, Black and Watts interview Roe again, who seems to espouse the same mindset. Black reveals that he knows Roe was once a promising student and accuses her of being cowed by a fear of failure. Frightened, she reveals the location of Butler's farm. Police raid the farm, freeing several captive youths, including Bryce, but Butler is nowhere to be found.

== Production ==
"A Room With No View" was directed by Thomas J. Wright, who helmed a total of twenty-six episodes across all three seasons. Wright would also go on to direct "Millennium", the series' crossover episode with its sister show The X-Files. "A Room With No View" was the first to have been written by producer Ken Horton, and his only solo writing credit. Horton would pen a further two episodes in the third season, both with Chip Johannessen.

"A Room With No View" saw the third appearance of recurring villain Lucy Butler, who had previously appeared in "Lamentation" and "Powers, Principalities, Thrones and Dominions", and would return for the third-season episodes "Antipas" and "Saturn Dreaming of Mercury". Redmond, a fan of series creator Chris Carter and recurring series director David Nutter, had initially auditioned for another episode of the first season which would have been directed by Nutter. Redmond did not get the part she auditioned for but was instead contacted about portraying a minor recurring role instead, which led to her casting as Butler. The episode features the repeated use of the song "Love Is Blue", performed by Paul Mauriat.

== Broadcast and reception ==
"A Room With No View" was first broadcast on the Fox network on April 24, 1998. The episode earned a Nielsen rating of 4.8 during its original broadcast, meaning that 4.8 percent of households in the United States viewed the episode. This represented approximately 4.7 million households, and left the episode the eighty-second most-viewed broadcast that week. (Note: Each ratings point represented 980,000 households during the 1997–98 television season.)

The episode has received positive reviews from critics. The A.V. Club's Zack Handlen rated the episode an "A", finding it to be a particularly well-executed version of kidnapping trope in crime thrillers. Handlen also praised the development of the Lucy Butler character, feeling positively that her scenes did not seem like "rote horror" but made use of clear motives and characterization. Bill Gibron, writing for DVD Talk, rated the episode 4.5 out of 5, praising the dialogue and the use of "Love Is Blue". However, Gibron felt that the episode did little to move the series along, not exploring any of the season's themes or mythology. Robert Shearman and Lars Pearson, in their book Wanting to Believe: A Critical Guide to The X-Files, Millennium & The Lone Gunmen, rated "A Room With No View" five stars out of five. Shearman felt the episode was the season's most frightening installment, as it dispensed with the wider theological trappings that he felt lessened the impact of other episodes. He also praised the decision to bring back Redmond as Lucy Butler, finding the character to be a good balance between the different depictions of evil depicted throughout the series.

== Footnotes ==
=== References ===
- Genge, N. E. (1997). Millennium: The Unofficial Companion Volume Two. Century. ISBN 0712678697.
- Shearman, Robert; Pearson, Lars (2009). Wanting to Believe: A Critical Guide to The X-Files, Millennium & The Lone Gunmen. Mad Norwegian Press. ISBN 978-0975944691.
