= The Thin White Line (Millennium) =

- Millennium episode
- Episode no.: Season 1 Episode 14
- Directed by: Thomas J. Wright
- Written by: Glen Morgan; James Wong
- Production code: 4C13
- Original air date: February 14, 1997

Guest appearances
- Jeremy Roberts as Richard Alan Hance; Scott Heindl as Jacob Tyler; Ken Tremblett as Agent Riley; Allan Harvey as Agent Johnson; Nancy Sivak as Anne Rothenberg; Mark Holden as Agent Clark; Larry Musser as Warden; Tom Heaton as Store Clerk

Episode chronology
← Previous "Force Majeure"	Next → "Sacrament"
- Millennium season 1

"'The Thin White Line" is the fourteenth episode of the first season of the American crime-thriller television series Millennium. It premiered on the Fox network on February 14, 1997. The episode was written by Glen Morgan and James Wong and directed by Thomas J. Wright. "The Thin White Line" featured guest appearances by Jeremy Roberts and Scott Heindl.

When a spate of killings seems to echo that of a man currently incarcerated, Millennium Group consultant Frank Black (Lance Henriksen) must confront the specter of his past and face a murderer who nearly took a younger Black's life.

"The Thin White Line" draws inspiration from real killers Herbert Mullin, Lawrence Bittaker and Roy Norris, and contains several references to Morgan and Wong's previous series Space: Above and Beyond. The episode was viewed by approximately 6.6 million households in its initial broadcast and has received positive reviews from critics.

== Plot ==
Anne Rothenburg answers a knock on her front door. When she speaks to the man waiting there, he hears something else entirely; believing that she is giving her consent to be murdered, he attacks her. Millennium Group consultant Frank Black (Lance Henriksen) visits a Seattle hospital to pick up his wife Catherine (Megan Gallagher), who works there as a counsellor. Rothenburg is brought in on a stretcher by paramedics. Black notices a peculiar slash across her palm and glances down at his own, which bears a scar matching the woman's cut exactly. Rothenburg dies of her injuries.

Black contacts Seattle police detective Bob Bletcher (Bill Smitrovich) for information on Rothenburg. Her husband found her when he came home, assuming that she had surprised a burglar. Elsewhere, Rothenburg's attacker shoots the clerk in a liquor store, again hearing the victim give permission to be killed. Black and Bletcher review security camera footage of the crime, which leads to them discovering half a playing card—the Jack of Spades—at the scene. Rothenburg's home is searched, and the other half is found there.

Black tells Bletcher about Richard Alan Hance (Jeremy Roberts), a serial killer Black had helped to apprehend twenty years before. Hance was a disturbed Vietnam War veteran who marked his kills with half a playing card, a custom he picked up during his tours of duty. Black was one of a number of FBI agents who responded to an anonymous tip, leading them to Hance's location; however, the tip was called in by Hance himself and the raid became an ambush in which three agents were killed. Black was cornered by Hance, who cut open his palm and nearly took Black's life before the young Black was able to overpower and arrest him.

Black realizes that the current murderer must be Hance's former cellmate Jacob Tyler (Scott Heindl). Black visits Hance in prison and realizes that Tyler believes himself Hance's reincarnation, aspiring to follow his methods exactly. Meanwhile, Tyler calls the police and leaves an anonymous tip, telling them that the liquor store murderer is hiding in an abandoned building. Black accompanies a SWAT team encircling the building, but the officers come under sniper fire from a construction site across the street. Black and Bletcher separate as they search for Tyler, who gets the drop on Black. Black disarms Tyler, attempting to talk him into surrendering. Tyler empties a handgun at Black, but misses; when Bletcher confronts him, Tyler points the gun and Bletcher instinctively shoots and kills him.

== Production ==
"The Thin White Line" was written by frequent collaborators Glen Morgan and James Wong, and directed by Thomas J. Wright. "The Thin White Line" was the third episode of the series to have been written by Morgan and Wong, after "Dead Letters" and "522666". The duo would go on to pen a further twelve episodes over the series' run, and would take charge of the second season as co-executive producers. Wright would go on to direct twenty-six episodes across all three seasons, and would also direct "Millennium", the series' crossover episode with its sister show The X-Files. He had also previously worked with Morgan and Wong on their series Space: Above and Beyond.

The relationship between the characters of Jacob Tyler and Richard Allen Hance seems to have been based on that of Lawrence Bittaker and Roy Norris, two convicts whose time in prison together formed the basis of a partnership that saw them torture and kill several young women in 1979. Tyler's delusional visions of his victims consenting to be murdered may stem from West German serial killer Waldemar Szczepinski, who chose his victims based on their response to him ringing their doorbells—those who answered he deemed to have given their permission to be killed and their houses burgled; those who did not were simply left alone. The character also draws inspiration from American serial killer Herbert Mullin, who likewise felt that his victims had offered him permission to kill them. Mullin claimed that their last words were often "I understand".

Scott Heindl, who portrayed Jacob Tyler, would later return in an unrelated role in the second season episode "A Room with No View", and the third season episode "Antipas". The episode contains several references to Morgan and Wong's short-lived series Space: Above and Beyond, which had been cancelled prior to the pair joining Millennium. The phrase "expect no mercy" found on the playing cards is the motto of that series' United States Marine Corps squadron, while the individual cards used—the Jack of Spades, King of Clubs and Queen of Hearts—mirror the call signs used by individual marines.

== Broadcast and reception ==
"It’s not the greatest script Glen Morgan and James Wong ever did. Indeed, it embraces many of their worst faults on some levels, as well as many of the worst faults of the show it’s a part of. But the thing MOVES, and when an episode rolls by as quickly as this one does, all sorts of objections get washed away by the momentum."

— The A.V. Club's Emily VanDerWerff on "The Thin White Line"

"The Thin White Line" was first broadcast on the Fox Network on February 14, 1997. The episode earned a Nielsen rating of 6.8 during its original broadcast, meaning that 6.8 percent of households in the United States viewed the episode. This represented 6.6 million households, and left the episode the seventy-second most-viewed broadcast that week. (Note: Each ratings point represented 970,000 households during the 1996–1997 television season.)

The episode received positive reviews from critics. The A.V. Club's Emily VanDerWerff rated the episode an A−, finding that it showed the series to be "unafraid to be unapologetically weird". VanDerWerff felt that "The Thin White Line" introduced elements of mysticism and the supernatural to the character of Frank Black, which "presages the weirder direction Morgan and Wong took the show in season two, while still staying roughly consistent with the first season’s more realistic focus". Bill Gibron, writing for DVD Talk, rated the episode 4.5 out of 5, comparing it to the 1991 film The Silence of the Lambs. Gibron noted that "with a stellar final act and a closing scene that has a great deal of impact in a very restrained manner, this is an excellent installment [sic]". Robert Shearman and Lars Pearson, in their book Wanting to Believe: A Critical Guide to The X-Files, Millennium & The Lone Gunmen, rated "The Thin White Line" five stars out of five, noting that "it's a return to the serial killer format, but it's never been done before with as much verve as it had here". Shearman compared the episode to both The Silence of the Lambs and the works of film director Quentin Tarantino, and felt that the interrogation scene between Black and Hance was "maybe the single best scene in the whole season".

Cinematographer Robert McLachlan received an American Society of Cinematographers award nomination in the category Outstanding Achievement in Cinematography in a Regular Series for his work on "The Thin White Line". McLachlan lost to Marc Reshovsky for the 3rd Rock from the Sun episode "Nightmare on Dick Street".

== Footnotes ==
=== References ===
- Genge, N. E. (1997). Millennium: The Unofficial Companion Volume Two. Century. ISBN 0712678697.
- Shearman, Robert; Pearson, Lars (2009). Wanting to Believe: A Critical Guide to The X-Files, Millennium & The Lone Gunmen. Mad Norwegian Press. ISBN 978-0975944691.
