= In Arcadia Ego =

- Millennium episode
- Episode no.: Season 2 Episode 18
- Directed by: Thomas J. Wright
- Written by: Chip Johannessen
- Original air date: April 3, 1998

Guest appearances
- Missy Crider as Janette; Mary-Pat Green as Sonny; David Jean-Thomas as Captain Stephens; Ed Lauter as Warden Kellard

Episode chronology
← Previous "Siren"	Next → "Anamnesis"
- Millennium season 2

"In Arcadia Ego" is the eighteenth episode of the second season of the crime-thriller television series Millennium. It premiered on the Fox network on April 3, 1998. The episode was written by Chip Johannessen, and directed by Thomas J. Wright.

In this episode, offender profiler Frank Black (Lance Henriksen) tracks two women who have escaped from prison; they believe that one of them is pregnant with a virginal conception. "In Arcadia Ego" featured guest appearances from Mary-Pat Green and Ed Lauter.

== Plot ==
In a women's prison, inmates and lovers "Sonny" Palmer (Mary-Pat Green) and Janette Viti (Missy Crider) begin an escape attempt by overpowering a guard; when attacking a second guard, Viti is shot. Sonny inflicts fatal injuries the second guard in response before realizing Viti has survived, as the bullet was stopped by a badge on her stolen uniform. The two believe they see a face in the flattened round. Later, profiler Frank Black (Lance Henriksen) is called to investigate the breakout by prison warden Kellard (Ed Lauter). Kellard enumerates Sonny's history of violence, having previously killed both her stepfather and husband. Black is puzzled by her need to escape, however, as her parole date is only a few months away.

Sonny and Viti carjack a motorist, bringing him to a house where they seem disappointed to find no one home. They abandon the car, with the motorist tied in the back seat, before fleeing to a motel where it is revealed that Viti is pregnant. Meanwhile, Black researches Sonny's history, finding that she seems to lash out defensively rather than aggressively—she killed the stepfather because he had been sexually abusing her sister, and killed her husband after a history of domestic abuse. He believes her escape was an attempt to protect someone else; a report by the hijacked motorist reveals Viti's pregnancy to the investigators. Black believes one of the guards is the father. A guard named Shiffer admits to raping Viti under sedation in the infirmary.

Sonny and Viti visit a clinic for a sonogram but leave abruptly when they realize the guard they attacked died of his injuries. Black and fellow Millennium Group investigator Peter Watts (Terry O'Quinn) learn that the sonogram revealed a placenta praevia, which could prove fatal during labor. They also conjecture that the couple may attempt to flee by train, as Sonny had previously worked on a railroad. Black tracks them to a boxcar but is taken hostage by Sonny; Viti has now gone into labor. Black explains that Viti's rapist has confessed, which angers Sonny—she believes the pregnancy is a virgin birth.

Police begin to surround the boxcar as Viti's contractions intensify. When Sonny demands medical staff be brought in, two police officers pose as paramedics. Black warns Sonny to search their medical supplies and to avoid exposing herself to police snipers. He aids with Viti's delivery, but she dies of blood loss. The child is born white, apparently ruling out Shiffer, who is black, as its father. Reacting to Viti's death, Sonny runs outside and mimics drawing a gun, committing suicide by cop. Black later travels to the house where the couple had abandoned the car, meeting a religious couple who had been praying for Sonny and Viti during their sentences, who agree to adopt the child.

== Production ==
The script for "In Arcadia Ego" was written by Chip Johannessen, who went on to write a total of twelve episodes across all three seasons, including the series' final episode, "Goodbye to All That". The episode was directed by Thomas J. Wright, who helmed a total of twenty-six episodes across all three seasons. Wright would also go on to direct "Millennium", the series' crossover episode with its sister show The X-Files.

== Broadcast and reception ==
"In Arcadia Ego" was first broadcast on the Fox network on April 3, 1998. The episode earned a Nielsen rating of 5.5 during its original broadcast, meaning that 5.5 percent of households in the United States viewed the episode. This represented approximately 5.6 million households. (Note: Each ratings point represented 980,000 households during the 1998–99 television season.)

"In Arcadia Ego" received mixed reviews from critics. The A.V. Club's Zack Handlen rated the episode a "B+". Handlen praised Henriksen's acting in the episode, finding that he had given the character of Frank Black more dramatic weight here and throughout the second season compared to the calmer portrayals of the first season. However, Handlen considered the ending of the episode to be too "neat and tidy", resolving a potentially profound development for the series in quite a perfunctory manner. Robert Shearman and Lars Pearson, in their book Wanting to Believe: A Critical Guide to The X-Files, Millennium & The Lone Gunmen, rated "In Arcadia Ego" one star out of five. Shearman called the episode "uncharacteristically crass" and "simplistic to a fault", finding its characters much too one-dimensional to tell an effective story. Bill Gibron, writing for DVD Talk, rated the episode 3 out of 5, comparing it favorably to the first-season episode "The Wild and the Innocent", which similarly shared themes of parents on the run to safeguard a child. However, Gibron was critical of the episode's focus on "the miracle of birth", finding it uncharacteristic of the series.

== Footnotes ==
=== References ===
- Shearman, Robert; Pearson, Lars (2009). Wanting to Believe: A Critical Guide to The X-Files, Millennium & The Lone Gunmen. Mad Norwegian Press. ISBN 978-0975944691.
- McLean, James; Henriksen, Lance; Spotnitz, Frank; Carter, Chris (2012). Chamberlain, Adam; Dixon, Brian A. (eds.). Back to Frank Black. Fourth Horseman Press. ISBN 978-0988392298.
