= Somehow, Satan Got Behind Me =

- Millennium episode
- Episode no.: Season 2 Episode 21
- Directed by: Darin Morgan
- Written by: Darin Morgan
- Production code: 5C21
- Original air date: May 1, 1998

Guest appearances
- Bill Macy as Blurk; Dick Bakalyan as Abum; Alex Diakun as Greb; Wally Dalton as Toby; Dan Zukovic as Waylon Figgleif; Gabrielle Rose as Sally

Episode chronology
← Previous "A Room with No View"	Next → "The Fourth Horseman"
- Millennium season 2

"'Somehow, Satan Got Behind Me" is the twenty-first episode of the second season of the American crime-thriller television series Millennium. It premiered on the Fox network on May 1, 1998. The episode was written and directed by Darin Morgan, and featured guest appearances by Bill Macy, Dick Bakalyan and Alex Diakun.

In this episode, a group of demons convene in a doughnut shop to share stories of tempting and damning humans. However, their stories all seem to include one mysterious figure who can see them for who they really are—Frank Black (Lance Henriksen).

"Somehow, Satan Got Behind Me" marks Morgan's second and last script for the series, and parodies his earlier difficulties writing for The X-Files. The episode has received mixed to positive reviews, and earned Morgan a Bram Stoker Award for Best Screenplay nomination in 1999.

== Plot ==
Four elderly men meet for coffee late at night. The fourth to arrive is hostile to the waiter, who secretly urinates in the man's coffee. The man, Abum (Dick Bakalyan), realizes this, and the group share a laugh over it, during which they are revealed to actually be demons.

One of the demons, Blurk (Bill Macy), complains that there are no strong personalities in this century. He tells a story of Perry, a man he met hitch-hiking, who he molded into a serial killer over encouraging conversations. Perry sought to emulate Johnny Mack Potter, the country's most prolific killer, and to break his record number of murders. Perry, with Blurk in tow, began to murder a number of prostitutes and vagrants, quickly surpassing Potter's body count. However, Blurk grew bored with Perry's "mundane" murders, and provided the police with a tip that led to his arrest. Curiously, one of the men present at the arrest—profiler Frank Black (Lance Henriksen)—seems to see through Blurk's human disguise. In prison, Perry is later murdered by Potter, who reclaims his record in doing so.

Abum tells another story, which he believes shows that mankind no longer needs demonic temptation to be damned. Abum followed an everyman figure named Brock, watching his depressingly repetitive life. Brock often visited a strip club but without joy, which led Abum to believe he no longer took pleasure from sinning. One day, Abum added an additional irritation to Brock's life: he posed as a traffic warden and gave the man a ticket. This was enough to drive Brock to suicide. However, during this time, Abum also encountered Black, who again saw his demonic nature.

Greb (Alex Diakun) shares his tale of an overzealous television censor named Waylon Figgleif. Greb assumed the form of a small demonic baby and revealed himself to Figgleif, who broke down and began attempting to censor everyday life. Greb repeated his trick, encouraging Figgleif to burst onto the set of a science fiction show about alien abduction and kill several actors. The murder spree ended up being caught on camera and was broadcast by another network as a found footage special. However, Greb also notes that he too was spotted by Black during all of this.

The fourth devil, Toby (Wally Dalton), is convinced that Black really does know that they are demons. He explains that once, he was feeling ennui at his failure to damn humans. He met and courted an aging stripper, Sally, who fell in love with him. Their relationship blossomed, despite her having seen his true demonic form. However, Toby eventually betrays her by acting as if he is going to propose before insulting and breaking up with her. He later visited her home and found police investigating her suicide. Once again, Black is one of the investigators present and sees Toby for who he is. However, instead of recoiling, Black tells Toby that he can see how lonely the demon is.

Toby's story affects all the gathered demons, who realize how lonely they really are. As they get up to leave, Abum sarcastically praises the shop's coffee and briefly reveals his true form to the waiter.

== Production ==
"Somehow, Satan Got Behind Me" is the second, and last, episode of Millennium to have been written by Darin Morgan, who also directed the episode. Morgan had previously written and directed "Jose Chung's Doomsday Defense" earlier in the season. Morgan also served as a consulting producer for the season, and is the younger brother of Glen Morgan, an executive producer for the series.

Morgan's script contains several references to his time as a writer for Millennium's sister show, The X-Files. One of Morgan's episodes for that series, "War of the Coprophages", had come under heavy criticism by the standards and practices department at parent network Fox, who took exception to the initial script's heavy use of words such as "crap" to refer to the excrement that episode's cockroaches fed upon. Morgan attacked and parodied this approach with one of the tales in "Somehow, Satan Got Behind Me", with a network censor again targeting the use of the word "crap" and storming onto the set of a show resembling The X-Files being taped, featuring lookalikes of Fox Mulder and Dana Scully with theme music very similar to that series' playing in the background. The episode also contains a version of the dancing baby animation that was popular at the time, parodying its use on the series Ally McBeal.

Guest star Alex Diakun had previously appeared in the first season episode "Lamentation" in an unrelated role; while Dan Zukovic, who played network censor Waylon Figgleif, had also appeared in a small role in "Jose Chung's Doomsday Defense".

== Broadcast and reception ==
"Somehow, Satan Got Behind Me" was first broadcast on the Fox network on May 1, 1998. The episode earned a Nielsen rating of 5.7 during its original broadcast, meaning that 5.7 percent of households in the United States viewed the episode. This represented approximately 5.59 million households, and left the episode the eightieth most-viewed broadcast that week. (Note: Each ratings point represented 980,000 households during the 1997–98 television season.)

Morgan's script for the episode earned him a Bram Stoker Award nomination in 1999, for Best Screenplay; the award was won jointly by Bill Condon for Gods and Monsters and Alex Proyas, David S. Goyer and Lem Dobbs for Dark City.

The episode received mixed to positive reviews from critics. The A.V. Club's Zack Handlen rated the episode an A, calling it "maybe the best hour of television Millennium ever produced". Handlen felt that the episode's "disarmingly simple" premise belied its depth, and praised Morgan's script as perhaps the writer's best work. Bill Gibron, writing for DVD Talk, rated the episode 3.5 out of 5, calling it "a very fun, very irreverent respite for the series". Gibron felt positively about the episode's dialogue and humor, and praised it for its self-parodying elements. Robert Shearman and Lars Pearson, in their book Wanting to Believe: A Critical Guide to The X-Files, Millennium & The Lone Gunmen, rated "Somehow, Satan Got Behind Me" two stars out of five, finding that it fit poorly with the tone of the series. Shearman felt that the episode was "self-indulgent and irrelevant at worst, and at best only sporadically funny".

== Footnotes ==
=== References ===
- Shearman, Robert; Pearson, Lars (2009). Wanting to Believe: A Critical Guide to The X-Files, Millennium & The Lone Gunmen. Mad Norwegian Press. ISBN 978-0975944691.
