= Anamnesis (Millennium) =

- Millennium episode
- Episode no.: Season 2 Episode 19
- Directed by: John Peter Kousakis
- Written by: Kay Reindl; Erin Maher
- Production code: 5C19
- Original air date: April 17, 1998

Guest appearances
- Kristen Cloke as Lara Means; Gwynyth Walsh as Emma Shetterly; John Pyper-Ferguson as Ben Fisher; Genele Templeton as Clare McKenna; Garry Davey as Ray McKenna; Brendon Fletcher as Alex Hanes

Episode chronology
← Previous "In Arcadia Ego"	Next → "A Room with No View"
- Millennium season 2

"Anamnesis" is the nineteenth episode of the second season of the American crime-thriller television series Millennium. It premiered on the Fox network on April 17, 1998. The episode was written by Kay Reindl and Erin Maher, and directed by John Peter Kousakis. "Anamnesis" featured guest appearances by Kristen Cloke and Gwynyth Walsh.

In this episode, Millennium Group member Lara Means (Cloke) teams up with Catherine Black (Megan Gallagher), the wife of a fellow Group member, to investigate the possibility that a schoolgirl experiencing visions may be biologically descended from Jesus Christ. The girl also has visions which involve Mary Magdalene.

Reindl and Maher based their script on their research into the role of women in the Bible, and compared the pairing of Lara Means and Catherine Black to that of the lead roles in The X-Files, Millennium's sister show. "Anamnesis" earned an audience of approximately 5.2 million households in its initial broadcast, and received mixed responses from television critics.

== Plot ==
The episode opens in medias res as social worker Catherine Black (Megan Gallagher) arrives moments too late to prevent a shooting in a school prayer group.

Several days earlier, Catherine meets Emma Shetterly (Gwynyth Walsh), the school's vice-principal. Shetterly explains that five students have claimed to be experiencing visions of Saint Mary, but believes the girls involved are unlikely candidates for divine visions, particularly the trouble-making Clare McKenna (Genele Templeton). Catherine speaks to the girls, who claim to have had visions during a sermon by Reverend Hanes; Hanes' son Alex refutes this. Catherine returns to Shetterly's office and is met by Lara Means (Kristen Cloke), who works with her husband Frank in the Millennium Group. Means explains that the Group has investigated many such reported visions.

Later, Catherine and Means listen to McKenna reading a passage from the Bible. Afterwards, McKenna reveals that she knows a great deal about the Polaroid Man, who kidnapped Catherine months earlier. Means receives a vision herself during the conversation and becomes convinced that McKenna is a prophet of some sort. Catherine thinks the girl is acting out, but Means reveals that she is reciting passages from the non-canonical Gnostic Gospels, which posited that Mary Magdalene was the only disciple to fully understand the teachings of Jesus. Means believes the girls are not seeing visions of Saint Mary, but of Mary Magdalene.

Later, Catherine is informed that the girls are missing. She and Means search the woods, finding the girls in a grotto. They are with a teacher from the school, Ben Fisher (John Pyper-Ferguson), who attacks Means; she subdues him, and he is arrested. Under questioning, it is revealed that Fisher is a former Group member charged with protecting the girls due to their powers. When Catherine later learns that Fisher has been released, she fears for McKenna's life. She rushes to the school, knowing the girls will be at a prayer meeting. However, she arrives too late to prevent Alex from firing upon the meeting; Fisher is killed while shielding McKenna. Later, Means shows Catherine two sets of DNA test results—one from McKenna, the other from the Shroud of Turin. The profiles seem to prove that McKenna is related to Jesus. Means entrusts them, and the decision as to whether to proliferate them, to Catherine.

== Production ==
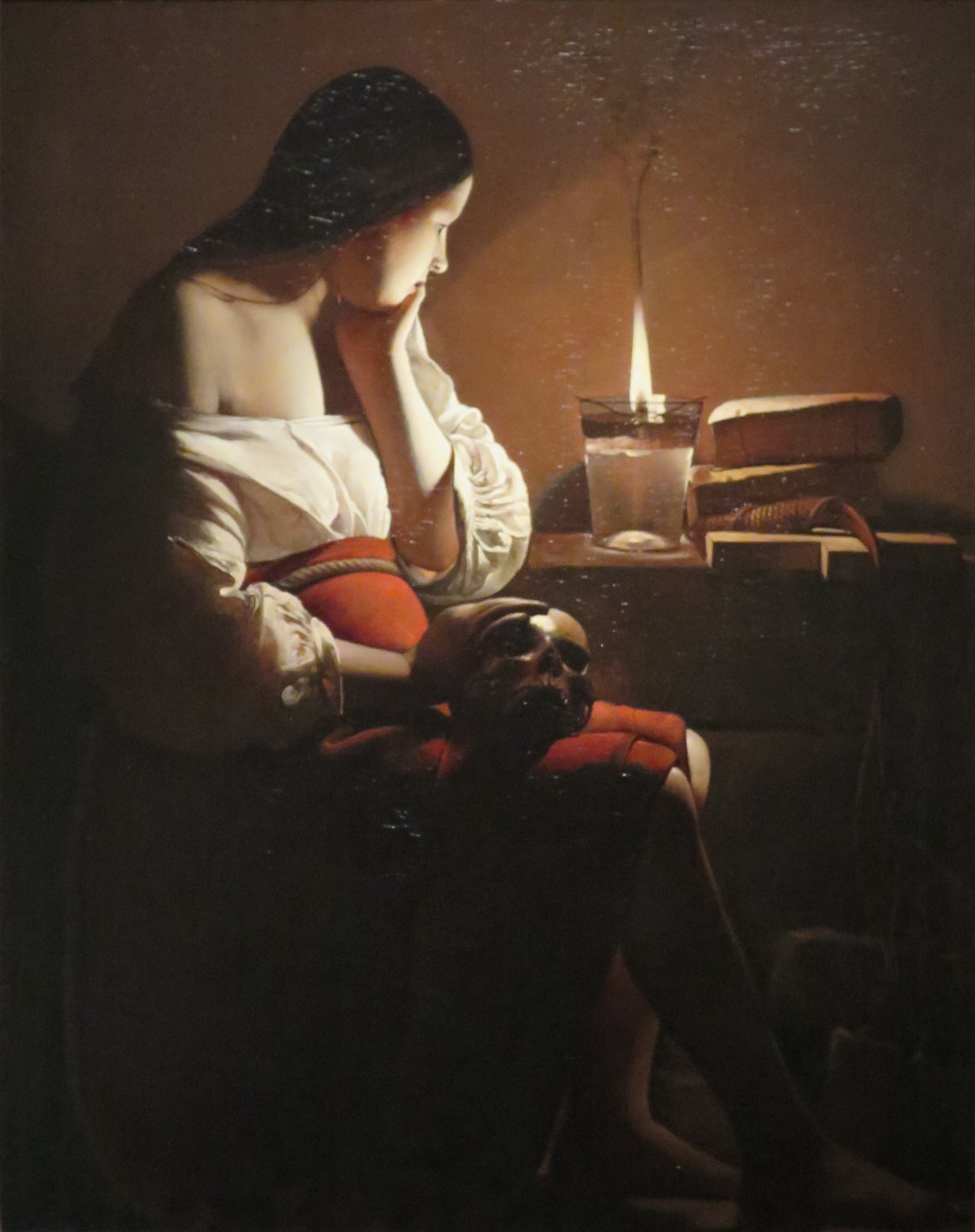
Reindl and Maher researched Mary Magdalene (1640 depiction pictured) in writing the episode.

"Anamnesis" is the third episode of Millennium to have been written by Kay Reindl and Erin Maher; the pair had penned two earlier instalments of the second season, and would return for another in the third season. The episode marks the only directorial contribution to the series by producer John Peter Kousakis.

Reindl and Maher researched early Christianity while writing the episode, learning that the traditional depiction of Mary Magdalene as a prostitute was probably an incorrect interpretation added later. Maher felt that Magdalene and early Christian priestesses were "pretty much weeded out of the Bible" over time, and wanted to explore the reasons why female religious figures may have been seen as threatening. The writers faced difficulty from the network's standards and practices office, who had taken exception to the depiction of Jesus Christ as having had a family. The pair also compared the writing of the episode to Millennium's sister show The X-Files, believing that the dynamic between Means and Black echoed that of Fox Mulder and Dana Scully on the latter programme, with one character a believer in the supernatural and the other a sceptic. The episode's opening scene makes use of the song "Dancing Barefoot" by Patti Smith.

== Broadcast and reception ==
"Anamnesis" was first broadcast on the Fox network on April 17, 1998. The episode earned a Nielsen rating of 5.3 during its original broadcast, meaning that 5.3 percent of households in the United States viewed the episode. This represented approximately 5.2 million households, and left the episode the eightieth most-viewed broadcast that week. (Note: Each ratings point represented 980,000 households during the 1997–98 television season.)

The A.V. Club's Emily VanDerWerff rated the episode a "B", finding the character of Catherine Black to have been one of its downfalls. VanDerWerff also criticised the holy blood plot line, comparing it to other contemporary takes on the idea such as the computer game Gabriel Knight 3: Blood of the Sacred, Blood of the Damned. However, VanDerWerff felt that Cloke and Gallagher worked well on screen together. Bill Gibron, writing for DVD Talk, rated the episode 3 out of 5, finding it to be "out of step, both with the series and the times". Gibron also felt that the characters of Black and Means were not strong enough to hold an episode together as lead roles. Robert Shearman and Lars Pearson, in their book Wanting to Believe: A Critical Guide to The X-Files, Millennium & The Lone Gunmen, rated "Anamnesis" one-and-a-half stars out of five. Shearman felt the episode suffered from having set up an interesting and emotive cold open, which he saw as a red herring to the episode's mystical, theological focus. He was also critical of using Means and Black as the episode's lead roles, finding that the lack of Henriksen's character detracted from the episode.

== Footnotes ==
=== References ===
- Shearman, Robert; Pearson, Lars (2009). Wanting to Believe: A Critical Guide to The X-Files, Millennium & The Lone Gunmen. Mad Norwegian Press. ISBN 978-0975944691.
