= The Hand of St. Sebastian =

- Millennium episode
- Episode no.: Season 2 Episode 8
- Directed by: Thomas J. Wright
- Written by: Glen Morgan; James Wong
- Production code: 5C08
- Original air date: November 14, 1997

Guest appearances
- C. C. H. Pounder as Cheryl Andrews; Philip Baker Hall as Group Elder; Gottfried John as Josef Heim; Allan Zinyk as Brian Roedecker

Episode chronology
← Previous "19:19"	Next → "Jose Chung's Doomsday Defense"
- Millennium season 2

"The Hand of St. Sebastian" is the eighth episode of the second season of the American crime-thriller television series Millennium. It originally aired on the Fox network on November 14, 1997. The episode was written by Glen Morgan and James Wong, and directed by Thomas J. Wright. "The Hand of St. Sebastian" featured a guest appearance from C. C. H. Pounder.

Millennium Group offender profilers Frank Black (Lance Henriksen) and Peter Watts (Terry O'Quinn) travel to Germany to locate a preserved relic of Saint Sebastian, unintentionally discovering cracks within the unity of the Group.

"The Hand of St. Sebastian" was inspired by Wong's research into Freemasonry and the Knights Templar; Wong wanted to replicate the disharmony of these societies within the Millennium Group. The episode has received mixed responses from critics, and was viewed by approximately 6.7 percent of the available audience in its initial broadcast.

== Plot ==
In the year 998, a monk is betrayed by his compatriot, and shot to death by archers. As they search his robe to find their objective—the mummified hand of Saint Sebastian—they notice a tattoo on the man's body: an ouroboros, which will later become the symbol of the Millennium Group.

In 1998, modern Group member Peter Watts (Terry O'Quinn) asks his colleague, Frank Black (Lance Henriksen), for help with a case the Group have not authorized; he remains cryptic as to what it is. They travel to Germany to investigate the murder of a Dr. Schlossburg, whose lab is found to house a mummified body. The two are arrested by German police, but when they realize they have apprehended fellow investigators they promise cooperation. However, the pair learn that Schlossburg has already been cremated; later they narrowly escape death when their rental car is rigged with a car bomb.

Black connects the attempt on their lives to Schlossburg's murder. He demands details of the case from Watts, who explains that the mummy found earlier dates to early Christianity, the time when the Group first convened. However, they realize they are being tailed by two men and return to their hotel. There, they are met by Cheryl Andrews (C. C. H. Pounder), a fellow Group member who has worked with them in the past. She offers her help, but Watts declines it. Watts is later able to access Schlossburg's computer files. Meanwhile, Schlossburg is found to be alive, regaining consciousness in a hospital bed and telling police his assailant was Watts.

Andrews tells Black she has been sent to prevent Watts acting outside the Group's remit; she gives Black a contact number and leaves. Later, Black returns to Schlossburg's lab and finds Watts, who explains that a knightly order, the Knights Chroniclers, had possessed the relic of Saint Sebastian at the turn of the second millennium; the hand imparts knowledge to its possessor that will help to overcome the evils associated with the turn of the millennium. Watts reveals that Schlossburg had uncovered the order's burial ground.

Black and Watts learn that Schlossburg is alive and visit him; the doctor does not recognize Watts but insists that his attacker identified himself by that name. He also reveals the locations of the burial ground, in a bog. After Black and Watts leave to reach it, Schlossburg is murdered by two assassins. At the bog, the pair find a mummified corpse clutching the relic; however, they have been followed by the police, and Watts is arrested for Schlossburg's murder.

Black tracks down Andrews at the storage building where the relic has been taken. They are ambushed by the two assassins, and during their escape, Black mentions where the relic is hidden. Andrews immediately turns on Black; the ambush was a trick to draw the information out of Black, while she had engineered events to use Watts as a fall man to discredit the Group. However, the police are able to intervene, hearing everything and rescuing Black. Later, Watts and Black study the relic, but Black is convinced that their own convictions will be more important to them than mystical artifacts.

== Production ==
"The Hand of St. Sebastian" was written by frequent collaborators Glen Morgan and James Wong. It was the ninth episode to have been written by the pair, who had penned several across the first and second seasons. The pair had also taken the roles of co-executive producers for the season. "The Hand of St. Sebastian" was directed by Thomas J. Wright; Wright had directed eight episodes previously and would helm a further seventeen over the series' run. Wright would also go on to direct "Millennium", the series' crossover episode with its sister show The X-Files.

The episode was driven by Wong's desire to write an episode focussing on Watts, as he wanted to showcase O'Quinn as an actor. Wong also felt "that by revealing that the Millennium Group had existed for centuries and setting the episode overseas, that would give the story greater scope and weight". The introduction of schisms within the Group was inspired by Wong's research into the Knights Templar and Freemasonry, as he considered these secretive organizations to have mirrored the way he wanted to present the Group, and he felt each contained factions or reactionary elements which he wanted to recreate. The episode features the penultimate appearance by C. C. H. Pounder as pathologist Cheryl Andrews. Pounder portrayed the character in four other episodes, appearing across all three seasons.

== Broadcast and reception ==
We've watched Frank Black struggle with human monsters and monster monsters, with forces beyond his control and almost certainly beyond his understanding, at the behest of the Millennium Group, whose true motives remain largely a mystery [...] Anyone, after all of that, would be looking for something to hold onto, for some sign or proof that his efforts were pointed in the right direction.

— The A.V. Club's Zack Handlen

"The Hand of St. Sebastian" was first broadcast on the Fox network on November 14, 1997. The episode earned a Nielsen rating of 6.7 during its original broadcast, meaning that 6.7 percent of households in the United States viewed the episode. This represented approximately 6.566 million households, and left the episode the eightieth most-viewed broadcast that week. (Note: Each ratings point represented 980,000 households during the 1997–98 television season.)

"The Hand of St. Sebastian" has received mixed responses from critics. The A.V. Club's Zack Handlen rated the episode a "B+", finding it to contain an entertaining mix of mysticism and espionage. However, he considered the revelation that Andrews was a turncoat within the Group to be confusing, finding it unclear how a human villain could be defined within a series already making use of demons and theological evil. Bill Gibron, writing for DVD Talk, rated the episode 4.5 out of 5, praising the guest performances by Pounder and Hall. Gibron wrote that the episode had a "feature film" feel, and described it as one of the best episodes of the season.

However, Robert Shearman and Lars Pearson, in their book Wanting to Believe: A Critical Guide to The X-Files, Millennium & The Lone Gunmen, rated "The Hand of St. Sebastian" one star out of five. Shearman felt that by this point, the series no longer resembled what it had been in its previous season, derisively comparing it to the Indiana Jones film series. He wrote that Henriksen's portrayal of Frank Black seemed "weakened" in the episode, as the actor had built a credible and deep character who now seemed entirely unlike his former self.

== Footnotes ==
=== References ===
- Genge, N. E. (1997a). Millennium: The Unofficial Companion. Century. ISBN 0-7126-7833-6.
- Genge, N. E. (1997b). Millennium: The Unofficial Companion Volume Two. Century. ISBN 0712678697.
- Shearman, Robert; Pearson, Lars (2009). Wanting to Believe: A Critical Guide to The X-Files, Millennium & The Lone Gunmen. Mad Norwegian Press. ISBN 978-0975944691.
