= Lachlan Murdoch (actor) =

Canadian film and television actor (born 1986)

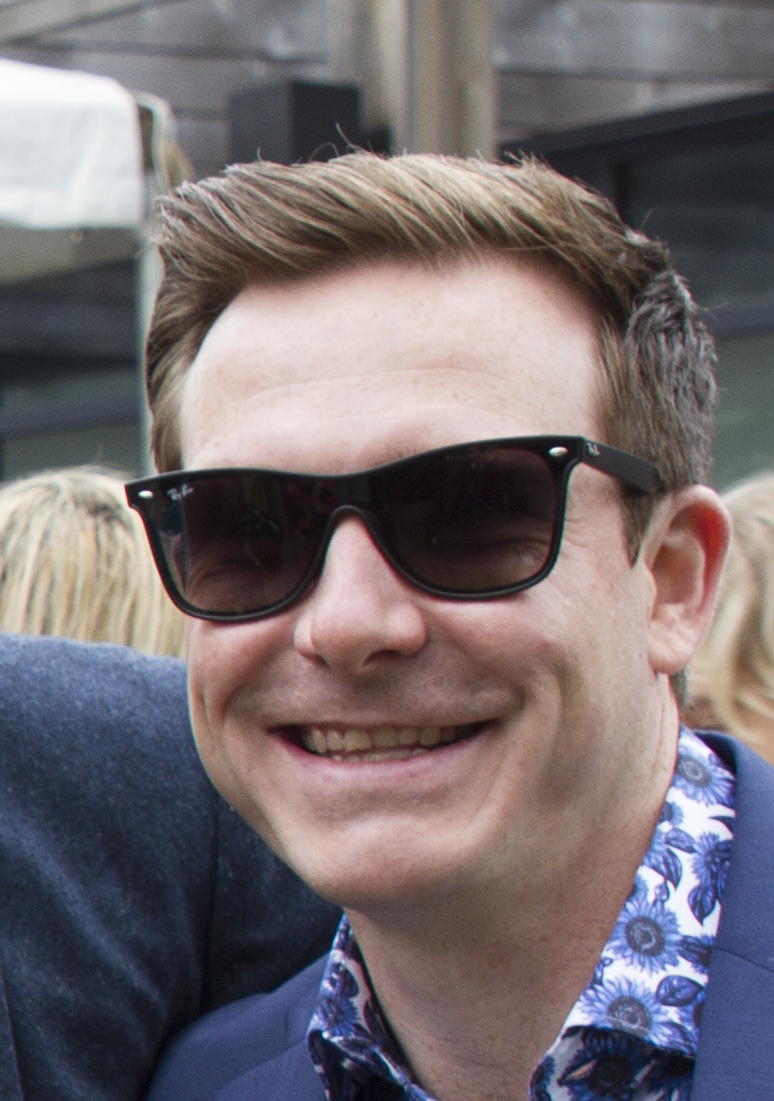
- Lachlan Murdoch at the 2018 CFC Annual BBQ
- Born: February 16, 1986 (age 40); Vancouver, British Columbia, Canada
- Occupation: Actor
- Years active: 1992-present

Lachlan Murdoch (born February 16, 1986) is a Canadian film and television actor, best known for playing Constable Henry Higgins on Murdoch Mysteries.

== Filmography ==
=== Film ===
Year	Title	Role	Notes
1992	Leaving Normal	Marshall	
1994	The Santa Clause	Fax Kid	
1996	Kids in the Hall: Brain Candy	Raymond's Kid	
1998	Golf Punks	Bernie	
2002	Cheats	Horny	
2018	Story A	Closed	Short film

=== Television ===
Year	Title	Role	Notes
1992	Fatal Memories	Aaron Lipsker	TV movie
1993	Final Appeal	Willie	TV movie
1993	No Child of Mine	Danny	TV movie
1993–1996	The X-Files	Right Fielder	2 Episodes
1994	One More Mountain	James Reed Jr.	TV movie
1995	Choices of the Heart: The Margaret Sanger Story	Grant Sanger	TV movie
1995	Net Worth	Child	TV movie
1996	Madison	Stephan Wakaluk	2 Episodes
1997	Dead Man's Gun	Jesse Holbrook	Episode: Mail Order Bride
1997	Millennium	Hobo	Episode: The Curse of Frank Black
1997–1998	The Outer Limits	Ma'al / John Virgil Jr.	2 Episodes
1998	Loyal Opposition	Blake Hayden	TV movie
1999	Resurrection	Rick	TV movie
1999	So Weird	James	Episode: Tulpa
1999	Stargate SG-1	Tomin	Episode: Learning Curve
1999–2001	Sherlock Holmes in the 22nd Century	Guest	Voice
2000	Frankie & Hazel	Mark, Pup	TV movie
2001	Papa's Angels	Alvin Jenkins	TV movie
2001	Dodson's Journey	Darrell	TV movie
2001	By Dawn's Early Light	Evan	TV movie
2002	Sins of the Father	Young Tom	TV movie
2002	Taken	Travis	TV mini-series
2006	Me and Luke	Charlie Benson	TV movie
2007	Jeff Ltd.	Boss	Episode: A Fishy Award
2008–present	Murdoch Mysteries	Constable Henry Higgins	103 Episodes
2012–2013	Copper	Telegraph Operator	7 Episodes
2016	The Strain	NYPD Officer #2	Episode:Fort Defiance
2018	Designated Survivor	Lead Bomb Tech	Episode: Fallout
2022	Hudson and Rex	Bob Murphy	Episode: Dog days are over
2023	Macy Murdoch	Constable Henry Higgins	
