= Millennium season 2 =

Millennium
- Season 2
- Season 2 DVD cover
- No. of episodes: 23

Release
- Original network: Fox
- Original release: September 19, 1997 – May 15, 1998

Season chronology
- ← Previous; Season 1 Next → Season 3

The second season of the serial crime-thriller television series Millennium commenced airing in the United States on September 19, 1997, concluding on May 15, 1998 after airing twenty-three episodes. It tells the story of retired FBI Agent Frank Black (Lance Henriksen). Black lives in Seattle, Washington with his wife Catherine (Megan Gallagher) and daughter Jordan (Brittany Tiplady). He works for a mysterious organization known as the Millennium Group, investigating murders using his remarkable capability of relating to the monsters responsible for horrific crimes. After killing a man who stalked and kidnapped Catherine, Black faces tension within his family while simultaneously being drawn deeper into the sinister Group.

The season began with "The Beginning and the End", which marked the first episode of the series helmed by new co-executive producers Glen Morgan and James Wong, who would remain in charge for the full season. Accolades earned by the season include a Bram Stoker Award nomination for Darin Morgan's "Somehow, Satan Got Behind Me", a Primetime Emmy Award nomination for "Jose Chung's Doomsday Defense" guest star Charles Nelson Reilly and a Young Artist Award win for Tiplady.

== Production ==
The second season saw series creator Chris Carter step down as executive producer, being replaced by the team of Glen Morgan and James Wong. Morgan and Wong had previously written episodes for the series in its first season, and had worked with Carter on his first television series The X-Files. Morgan and Wong left similar positions on The X-Files to take up the Millennium roles, with Fox president Sandy Grushow saying that "with Chris writing and producing X-Files' fifth season, as well as the feature film, it was critical that we identify exec producers who could enable Millennium to grow".

Discussing plans for the season, Morgan noted that "the Millennium Group is a much deeper organization" than seen in the first season, adding that "they're considering [Frank Black] for a candidate for the group (and) trying to show him that at the millennium there's going to be an event - either fire and brimstone or harmonic convergence". Wong spoke about how the character of Catherine Black changed, saying "there's a different relationship between Frank and his family this season because of the separation ... I think that will not only bring some kind of heartfelt drama but humor into it". Wong also stated "we don't want to have the audience expect to see a serial killer every week. ... We would like to make it so that it's a surprise to them, just like it is a surprise when you watch The X-Files".

Producer John Peter Kousakis has noted that the first and second seasons, and the third season after those, were markedly different, crediting each season's differing approach to the changes in leadership behind the scenes; Kousakis felt that the character of Frank Black remained the main constant throughout the series. Fellow producer Ken Horton felt that the change in focus for season two arose as the first season's focus on serial killers had "overpowered" its storytelling, making it necessary to focus attention elsewhere instead; the focus switched from external forces and villains to the internal workings of the Millennium Group. The series' musical supervisor Mark Snow found that Morgan and Wong brought another new element to the series—the music of Bobby Darin, which has been a hallmark of the duo's work. Darin's music accompanied Snow's scores in a number of episodes, often as diegetic music being listened to by Lance Henriksen's character. Snow believed this gave the character a down-to-earth, everyman feel.

== Cast ==
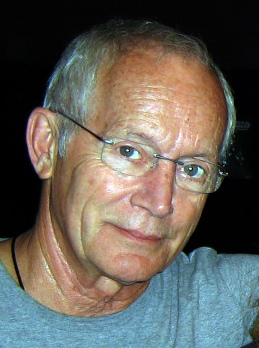
Series star Lance Henriksen

=== Starring ===
- Lance Henriksen as Frank Black
- Megan Gallagher as Catherine Black

=== Recurring cast ===
==== Also starring ====
- Brittany Tiplady as Jordan Black

==== Guest starring ====
- Terry O'Quinn as Peter Watts
- Peter Outerbridge as Barry Baldwin
- Stephen E. Miller as Andy McClaren

== Reception ==
=== Accolades ===
The second season earned several awards and nominations for those associated with the series. Tiplady and "Monster" guest star Lauren Diewold earned nominations at the 1998 Young Artist Awards, with Tiplady winning in the category Best Performance in a TV Comedy/Drama – Supporting Young Actress Age Ten or Under. Henriksen earned a Golden Globe Award nomination for Best Actor in a Television Series Drama, losing out to Anthony Edwards as ER's Mark Greene At the Primetime Emmy Awards, the series earned two nomination. Charles Nelson Reilly earned an acting nod for his guest role in "Jose Chung's Doomsday Defense", losing out to The Practice's John Larroquette. Millennium also earned a nomination for Outstanding Sound Editing for a Series, losing the award to ER. The season also produced a Bram Stoker Award nomination in 1999, for Darin Morgan's episode "Somehow, Satan Got Behind Me"; the award was won jointly by Bill Condon for Gods and Monsters and Alex Proyas, David S. Goyer and Lem Dobbs for Dark City.

=== Critical reception ===
Writing for Slant magazine, Keith Uhlich gave the season an overall rating of three-and-a-half stars out of five, finding that the appointment of Morgan and Wong was "an inspired choice that led to, arguably, the finest episodic run ever produced under [series creator Chris] Carter's Ten-Thirteen Productions banner". Uhlich found that the season was torn between episodes remaining true to the Carter-led first season's "serial killer of the week" format and make-it-up-as-you-go-along approach to storytelling", and Morgan and Wong's attempt to introduce a continuous story arc which lent a "sealed-off feel" to the season, finding that the latter approach lead to a "compulsively watchable" but largely dated end result. DVD Talk's Bill Gibron rated the season overall four-and-a-half stars out of five, finding that the new thematic direction was "right on the money". Gibron felt that the season "was truly ahead of its time. It predates and predicts such fashionable fads as The Da Vinci Code, the omens of terrorist evil and the slow erosion of the citizenry's faith in the Federal Government". Emily VanDerWerff, writing for The A.V. Club, wrote that "the second season of Millennium is some sort of work of weird genius". VanDerWerff added that the season "moves like a series with a new purpose, with a new sense of meaning. Morgan and Wong start tossing ideas at the wall with a thrilling abandon, almost as if they were pretty sure they’d never work in Hollywood again".

Robert Shearman and Lars Pearson, in their book Wanting to Believe: A Critical Guide to The X-Files, Millennium & The Lone Gunmen, rated several episodes across the season highly, awarding five stars out of five to "The Curse of Frank Black", "Jose Chung's Doomsday Defense", "Midnight of the Century", "A Room with No View", "The Fourth Horseman" and "The Time Is Now". However, several episodes rated poorly, with "Beware of the Dog", "A Single Blade of Grass", "The Hand of St. Sebastian", "Roosters", "In Arcadia Ego" and "Anamnesis" being seen as particularly poor. In all, Shearman singled out the season's climactic two-part episodes "The Fourth Horseman" and "The Time Is Now" as the highlight of the season, finding that Morgan and Wong took a considerable risk with the storyline as they believed the series would be cancelled at the end of the season, but believing that the episodes gained from this additional level of attempted closure.

== Episodes ==
No. overall	No. in season	Title	Directed by	Written by	Original release date	Prod. code	US viewers (millions)
23	1	"The Beginning and the End"	Thomas J. Wright	Glen Morgan & James Wong	September 19, 1997	5C01	12.09
After Catherine Black goes missing in the Seattle Airport in the previous episode, Frank Black desperately searches for his wife, who has been abducted by a cunning stalker who is luring him into a trap.
24	2	"Beware of the Dog"	Allen Coulter	Glen Morgan & James Wong	September 26, 1997	5C02	9.87
As Frank's marriage begins to crumble, a pack of vicious dogs terrorises a small town, and as Frank investigates he discovers several truths about the Millennium Group.
25	3	"Sense and Antisense"	Thomas J. Wright	Chip Johannessen	October 3, 1997	5C03	10.09
Frank aids in the search for a man who is supposedly carrying a highly contagious virus and discovers the secret behind the Human Genome Project.
26	4	"Monster"	Perry Lang	Glen Morgan & James Wong	October 17, 1997	5C04	8.93
In rural Arkansas, Frank investigates the owner of a daycare center accused of child abuse, only to be accused himself.
27	5	"A Single Blade of Grass"	Rodman Flender	Erin Maher & Kay Reindl	October 24, 1997	5C05	9.93
In Manhattan, Frank Black and an anthropologist link a bizarre, ritualistic slaying to a lost tribe of Native Americans who follow apocalyptic prophecies.
28	6	"The Curse of Frank Black"	Ralph Hemecker	Glen Morgan & James Wong	October 31, 1997	5C07	8.54
On Halloween, Frank experiences eerie visions and strange events that spark flashbacks to his youth—and a telling encounter with a troubled World War II veteran.
29	7	"19:19"	Thomas J. Wright	Glen Morgan & James Wong	November 7, 1997	5C06	9.13
In southeastern Oklahoma, Frank races against time to locate a busload of abducted children, whom a crazed visionary has entombed in an abandoned quarry.
30	8	"The Hand of St. Sebastian"	Thomas J. Wright	Glen Morgan & James Wong	November 14, 1997	5C08	10.10
In Germany, Frank Black and his driven companion Peter Watts seek the Millennium Group's secret origins, which are steeped in dark intrigue dating to the first millennium.
31	9	"Jose Chung's Doomsday Defense"	Darin Morgan	Darin Morgan	November 21, 1997	5C09	8.04
An apostate member of a pop religion is murdered, leading Frank to co-investigate with a flamboyant writer.
32	10	"Midnight of the Century"	Dwight Little	Kay Reindl & Erin Maher	December 19, 1997	5C11	7.89
Eerie visions that haunt Black at Christmastime hark back to his troubled youth and lead to a fateful reunion with his estranged father.
33	11	"Goodbye Charlie"	Ken Fink	Richard Whitley	January 9, 1998	5C10	8.91
Serial murders in the guise of assisted suicides stymie Frank, whose primary suspect is a charismatic hospice nurse. Frank and Lara investigate to determine if it is murder.
34	12	"Luminary"	Thomas J. Wright	Chip Johannessen	January 23, 1998	5C12	9.15
In defiance of the Millennium Group, Frank Black sets off on his own into the Alaska wilderness to search for a missing teen who may have gotten in harm's way.
35	13	"The Mikado"	Roderick Pridy	Michael R. Perry	February 6, 1998	5C13	7.92
Frank Black, Peter Watts, and Brian Roedecker track a possibly long-dormant serial killer who is now broadcasting his murders over the Internet.
36	14	"The Pest House"	Allen Coulter	Glen Morgan & James Wong	February 27, 1998	5C15	8.61
Gruesome killings linked to urban myths are committed near a psychiatric hospital, where Frank and Peter conduct an intensive investigation that yields multiple suspects.
37	15	"Owls"	Thomas J. Wright	Glen Morgan & James Wong	March 6, 1998	5C14	8.11
Mystery and murder surround a search for a piece of the Crucifixion cross that sparks infighting among the Millennium Group.
38	16	"Roosters"	Thomas J. Wright	Glen Morgan & James Wong	March 13, 1998	5C16	8.41
A venerable Millennium Group member links the schism within the organization to the actions of an underground Nazi clique.
39	17	"Siren"	Allen Coulter	Glen Morgan & James Wong	March 20, 1998	5C17	8.86
The seizure of a ship smuggling Chinese immigrants draws Frank Black into a mystery surrounding another passenger: an enigmatic seductress.
40	18	"In Arcadia Ego"	Thomas J. Wright	Chip Johannessen	April 3, 1998	5C18	8.68
In Idaho, Black tracks two escaped female prisoners, one of whom is pregnant and believes it to be a virgin birth.
41	19	"Anamnesis"	John Peter Kousakis	Kay Reindl & Erin Maher	April 17, 1998	5C19	8.28
A sensitive high-school girl in Washington state claims to have religious visions in a case that raises controversial issues and builds to violence in a classroom.
42	20	"A Room with No View"	Thomas J. Wright	Ken Horton	April 24, 1998	5C20	7.34
Clues in the disappearance of a bright, outgoing teenage boy point to Frank Black's nemesis: the unearthly, seductive woman who killed Bob Bletcher.
43	21	"Somehow, Satan Got Behind Me"	Darin Morgan	Darin Morgan	May 1, 1998	5C21	8.74
Four demons assemble overnight at a doughnut shop and reflect on the havoc they have wreaked on humanity.
44	22	"The Fourth Horseman"	Dwight Little	Glen Morgan & James Wong	May 8, 1998	5C22	6.68
Frank Black takes a stand against the Millennium Group over its intensified secrecy and its involvement with a deadly contagion to which he has been exposed.
45	23	"The Time Is Now"	Thomas J. Wright	Glen Morgan & James Wong	May 15, 1998	5C23	7.01
The spread of a virulent disease coupled with mysterious Millennium Group operations kindle crises that beset Frank Black's friend Lara Means and his own family.

== Footnotes ==
=== References ===
- Shearman, Robert; Pearson, Lars (2009). Wanting to Believe: A Critical Guide to The X-Files, Millennium & The Lone Gunmen. Mad Norwegian Press. ISBN 978-0975944691.
- McLean, James; Henriksen, Lance; Spotnitz, Frank; Carter, Chris (2012). Chamberlain, Adam; Dixon, Brian A. (eds.). Back to Frank Black. Fourth Horseman Press. ISBN 978-0988392298.
- Chris Carter, John Peter Kousakis, Lance Henriksen, Michael R. Perry, Ken Horton, Thomas J. Wright, Mark Snow, Chip Johannessen, Kristen Cloke, Megan Gallagher, Frank Spotnitz, Mark Freeborn (2004). The Turn of the Tide: The Making of Season 2 (DVD). Millennium: The Complete Second Season: 20th Century Fox Home Entertainment.
