= Jose Chung's Doomsday Defense =

- Millennium episode
- Frank Black and Det. Geibelhouse interview the head Selfosophist in his office.
- Episode no.: Season 2 Episode 9
- Directed by: Darin Morgan
- Written by: Darin Morgan
- Production code: 5C09
- Original air date: November 27, 1997
- Running time: 43 minutes

Guest appearances
- Charles Nelson Reilly as Jose Chung; Patrick Fabian as Ratfinkovich; Richard Steinmetz as Mr. Smooth; Alec Willows as Detective Twohey; Sandra Steier as The Feminist; Scott Owen as Nostradamus Nutball; Murray Rabinovitch as Juggernaut Onan Goopta; Dan Zukovic as Robbinski

Episode chronology
← Previous "The Hand of St. Sebastian"	Next → "Midnight of the Century"
- Millennium season 2

"Jose Chung's Doomsday Defense" is the ninth episode of the second season of Fox's Millennium. Controversial writer Jose Chung (portrayed by Charles Nelson Reilly, reprising his role from The X-Files episode "Jose Chung's From Outer Space") comes to the aid of criminal profiler Frank Black and the Millennium Group when a bizarre religious group known as Selfosophy (a parody of real-world Scientology) targets him for harassment because of his authorship of a short story concerning the cult. The question becomes, as Frank puts it, "What the hell is going on here?"

== Plot synopsis ==
As a series of still photographs pass into view, author Jose Chung describes the life of Juggernaut Onan Goopta, who went to college hoping to become a famous neuroscientist and instead was overcome by dementia and institutionalized. During his hospital stay, Goopta decided to become a writer. His first literary works were so incompetent they were mistaken for "brilliant parodies." Chung met Goopta when his stories were published in a detective magazine. When that publication folded, a desperate Goopta "changed the course of human history" when he published the first in a series of highly successful self-help books and founded the "Institute of Selfosophy," which taught members how to shed negative thoughts. Anyone responsible for internal criticism of the organization was reprogrammed, and if that failed, dubbed a "Ratfinkovitch" and excommunicated from the institute.

While performing research on "the newly arising belief systems at the end of the millennium," Chung encountered Joseph Ratfinkovitch, who was excommunicated for reading Chung's most recent fiction. Ratfinkovitch's body is discovered inside his apartment, the victim of an electrocution. Detective Bob Giebelhouse contacts Frank, hoping he can shed some light on the case. As the two examine the crime scene, Chung steps forward and claims that he is responsible for Ratfinkovitch's death. He explains that when Playpen magazine ran an excerpt from his short story, the Institute grew offended and instructed members to buy up all existing copies. However, Ratfinkovitch read, and enjoyed, the story.

Ratfinkovitch was then approached by Mr. Smooth, a fellow Selfosophist. Using a device called an Onan-o-Graph, Smooth attempted to reprogram Ratfinkovitch. According to Chung's version of events, the device malfunctioned and Ratfinkovitch was inadvertently electrocuted. However, Chung then admits he made the whole thing up. Frank and Giebelhouse meet with a Selfosophist spokesman, Robbinski, who insists his fellow members are incapable of murder. Despite this, Smooth attempts to control his homicidal rage after reading — and being offended by — Chung's story. He sends Chung a clown doll impaled with a variety of knives. Chung contacts Frank, explaining that the antagonist in his story sends similar threats before committing murder. At the conclusion of the story, Chung states, the "Selfosophist Psycho" confronts and kills the author.

Chung accompanies Frank to the scene of a (seemingly unrelated) murder on a college campus. The victim is Professor Amos Randi, a Nostradamus scholar. Frank concludes that the perpetrator is targeting victims he considers to be Nostradamus' three antichrists — and will attack two more authority figures. Chung does some profiling of his own and determines that the killer, who was fulfilling self-interpreted prophecies, targeted his ex-girlfriend's teacher. The trail, Chung believes, leads to a Hollywood movie theater where the victim is revealed to be the ticket girl. Frank realizes that Chung's profile predicted the murder, and later concludes that Chung is the killer's third antichrist. He, Watts and Geibelhouse race to Chung's hotel. Smooth, however, arrives first. He pulls out a gun and berates Chung for ridiculing Selfosophy.

Frank suddenly bursts through the door. Smooth takes a shot at Chung, misses, then sprints from the room. Frank follows Smooth onto the rooftop. Smooth convinces himself he can leap onto a neighboring building and escape. All the positive thoughts in the world cannot save him, however, and he plummets downward to his death. Meanwhile, the "Nostradamus Nutball" surprises Chung and murders him with a pickaxe. Later, Frank begins reading one of Chung's books, entitled Doomsday Defense. In it, Chung predicts the millennium will bring forth "one thousand years of the same old crap."

== Production ==
The Spotnitz Sanitarium is a reference to writer Frank Spotnitz.

== Reception ==
Charles Nelson Reilly was nominated for an Emmy for his depiction of Jose Chung in this episode. Matt Roush of USA Today wrote that the episode was "written with the density of a Simpsons cartoon. You'll scream till you laugh, or laugh till you scream." According to The Hollywood Reporter the "studio had taken concerned calls from within the Scientology organization and from reps of industry people who belong to Scientology, as one studio individual described it."

== See also ==
- "Jose Chung's From Outer Space"
- Lidsville, a 1971–73 TV series starring Charles Nelson Reiley as a green-masked, caped magician who flies a giant top hat.
