= Darin Morgan =

American screenwriter

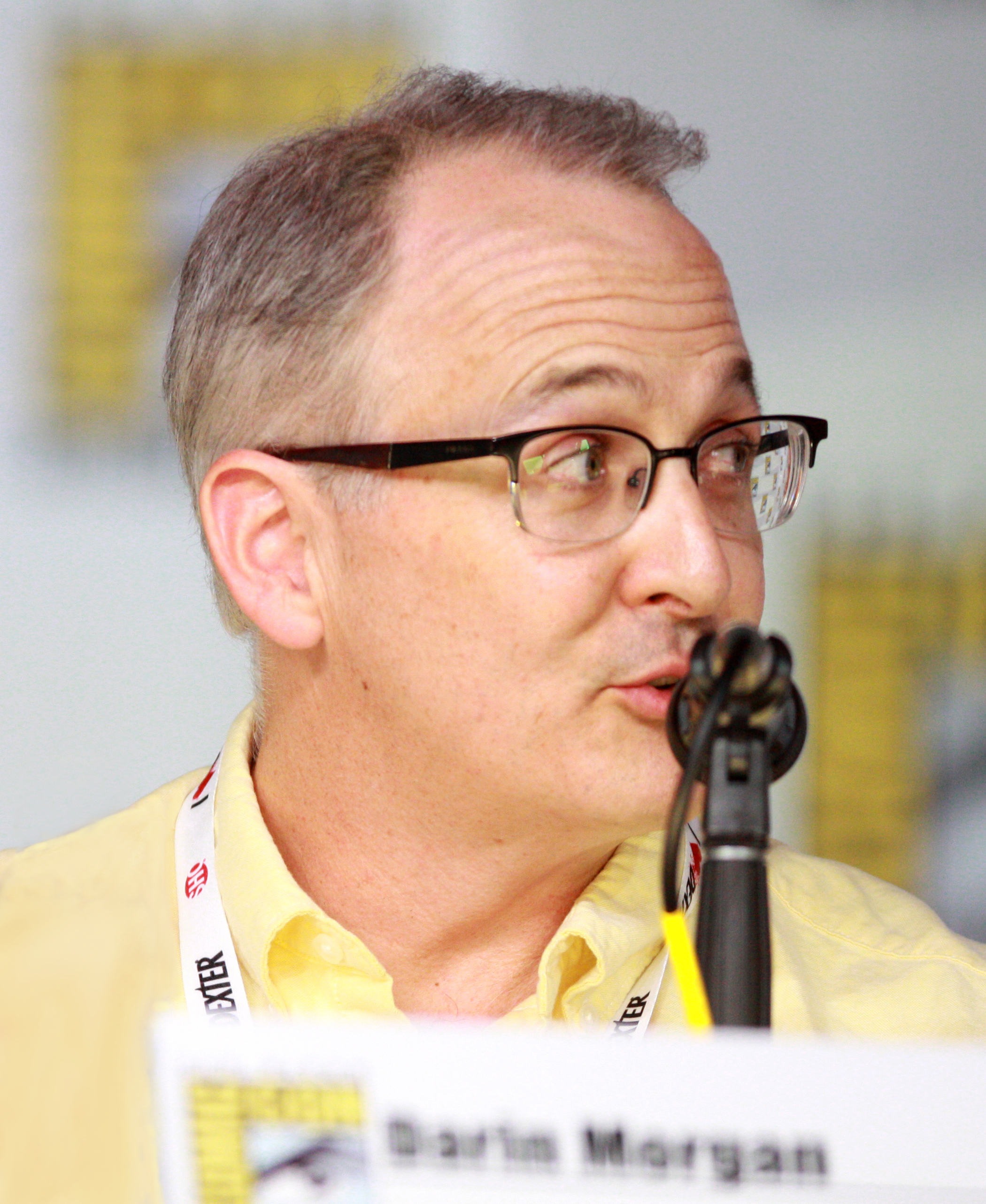
- Darin Morgan at the 2013 San Diego Comic-Con
- Born: Syracuse, New York
- Education: Loyola Marymount University
- Occupations: Writer; director; film producer; actor
- Years active: 1989–present

Darin Morgan (born 1966) is an American screenwriter best known for several offbeat, darkly humorous episodes of the television series The X-Files and Millennium. His teleplay for the X-Files episode "Clyde Bruckman's Final Repose" won a 1996 Emmy Award for Outstanding Writing for a Drama Series. In 2015, Morgan wrote and directed one episode for The X-Files season ten, and returned again in 2017 to write and direct another episode for season eleven. He is the younger brother of writer and director Glen Morgan.

== Writing career ==
Morgan was born in Syracuse, New York, and studied in the film program at Loyola Marymount University, where he co-wrote a six-minute short film that led to a three-picture deal with TriStar Pictures. Morgan subsequently wrote a number of unproduced screenplays and appeared in two small guest roles on The Commish and 21 Jump Street, where his brother Glen was a writer. Joel Silver hired Morgan to write the second intended Tales From The Crypt film after Demon Knight, called Dead Easy (aka Fat Tuesday) a New Orleans zombie romp. However the script was rejected by producers Gilbert Adler and A. L. Katz.

=== The X-Files ===
In 1994, Morgan was cast as the Flukeman, a mutated flukeworm the size of a human being, in "The Host", a second-season episode of The X-Files, where his brother, Glen, worked as a writer and producer. The episode originally aired on September 23, 1994. The role required Morgan to wear a cumbersome rubber suit for twenty hours at a stretch, an experience he described as "terrible, just horrible." Subsequently, he worked with his brother in developing the story for the next episode, "Blood" (aired September 30, 1994), for which he received story credit.

At the suggestion of producer Howard Gordon shortly thereafter, Morgan became a full-time staff writer for The X-Files, where he wrote his first episode, "Humbug" (originally aired on March 31, 1995). A quirky, funny, sometimes gruesome story about a series of murders in a colony of circus freaks, "Humbug" is considered a landmark episode in the history of The X-Files for broadening the dark tone and style of the series and taking it into funnier, less predictable directions. It was nominated for a 1996 Edgar Award.

Morgan's next episode, "Clyde Bruckman's Final Repose", originally aired on October 13, 1995. "Clyde Bruckman" remains a favorite of fans and critics alike, and was acclaimed for retaining the humorous spirit of "Humbug" while extending its story into darker, more poignant territory. Both Morgan and actor Peter Boyle, who played the titular depressed psychic Clyde Bruckman, won Emmy Awards for this episode. The Bruckman character in that episode was named after a real person, also named Clyde Bruckman, who was a comedy director and writer who had worked with Buster Keaton, Monty Banks, W. C. Fields, Laurel and Hardy, The Three Stooges, Abbott and Costello, and Harold Lloyd among others.

Morgan wrote two additional episodes of The X-Files in the 1990s: the absurdist cockroach invasion story "War of the Coprophages" (originally aired on January 5, 1996) and "Jose Chung's From Outer Space" (April 12, 1996). He also contributed to a rewrite of the episode "Quagmire" (May 3, 1996), although he was uncredited for his contributions at the time. He left the show after its third season, but joined the writing staff of Millennium, writing and directing two episodes with layered plots and humorous dialogue: "Jose Chung's Doomsday Defense" (originally aired on November 21, 1997) and "Somehow, Satan Got Behind Me" (May 1, 1998).

In a March 2015 interview, Chris Carter revealed that Morgan would write an episode for the show's then-announced tenth season. The episode, entitled "Mulder and Scully Meet the Were-Monster" aired on February 1, 2016. Morgan worked on the show's eleventh season, contributing the script for the episode "The Lost Art of Forehead Sweat" (aired on January 24, 2018 ).

In addition to his work as a writer, Morgan appeared in The X-Files episode "Small Potatoes" (April 20, 1997), playing Eddie Van Blundht, a self-described "loser" with the ability to shape-shift.

=== Later work ===
On August 11, 2004, it was announced that Morgan and screenwriter Sam Hamm were writing an untitled screenplay under development by DreamWorks SKG. According to The Hollywood Reporter, the story "concerns a marriage counselor, whose daughter is about to get married, who discovers that his future son-in-law is suffering from the delusion that he's a superhero."

Morgan worked on the second episode of former X-Files producer Frank Spotnitz's Kolchak: The Night Stalker remake, as consulting producer, though the show was canceled before any of Morgan's scripts were produced. The only script that Morgan wrote before the show was canceled was called "The M Word". It concerned a serial killer and a were-lizard, who may or may not be one and the same. It is available as a PDF on the second disc of the show's DVD set. The script was later rewritten for the tenth season of The X-Files as "Mulder And Scully Meet The Were-Monster."

Morgan worked as a consulting producer on the short-lived TV reboot of Bionic Woman (2008) and Fringe (2008). He subsequently joined his brother Glen's productions of Tower Prep (2010) and Intruders (2014) as a supervising producer, writing multiple episodes of each show.

== Filmography ==
=== Producer ===
Year	Show	Role	Notes
2014	Intruders	Supervising producer	Season 1
2010	Tower Prep	Supervising producer	Season 1
2009	Fringe	Consulting producer	Season 1
2008	Fringe	Consulting producer	Season 1
2007	Bionic Woman	Consulting producer	Season 1
2006	The Night Stalker	Consulting producer	Season 1
2005	The Night Stalker	Consulting producer	Season 1
1998	Millennium	Consulting producer	Season 2
1997	Millennium	Consulting producer	Season 2
1996	The X-Files	Story Editor	Season 3
1995	The X-Files	Story Editor	Season 3

=== Writer ===
Year	Show	Season	Episode	Episode #	Original air date
2018	The X-Files	11	"The Lost Art of Forehead Sweat"	4	January 24, 2018
2016	The X-Files	10	"Mulder and Scully Meet the Were-Monster"	3	February 1, 2016
2014	Those Who Kill	1	"Souvenirs"	5	April 13, 2014
2014	Intruders	1	"The Crossing Place"	7	October 4, 2014
2014	Intruders	1	"The Shepherds and the Fox"	5	September 20, 2014
2010	Tower Prep	1	"Dreams"	9	December 14, 2010
2010	Tower Prep	1	"Book Report"	6	November 23, 2010
1998	Millennium	2	"Somehow, Satan Got Behind Me"	21	May 1, 1998
1997	Millennium	2	"Jose Chung's Doomsday Defense"	9	November 21, 1997
1996	The X-Files	3	"Jose Chung's From Outer Space"	20	April 12, 1996
1996	The X-Files	3	"War of the Coprophages"	12	January 5, 1996
1995	The X-Files	3	"Clyde Bruckman's Final Repose"	4	October 13, 1995
1995	The X-Files	2	"Humbug"	20	March 31, 1995
