= Ken Horton =

Television producer

- Occupation: Television producer

Kenneth Horton is a television producer, and occasional writer and director, having worked on Dallas, The X-Files, Millennium and Smallville. He was twice nominated for the Emmy Award for outstanding drama series for his work on The X-Files.

== Biography ==
=== Dallas ===
Horton's first television credit was as co-executive producer of the last two seasons of 1980's soap opera Dallas, from 1989 to 1991. During his time on the series he also wrote two episodes: "Will Power" in 1990 and "Those Darned Ewings" in 1991.

=== The X-Files and Millennium ===
Horton joined the crew of The X-Files as a consulting producer for the fourth season in 1996. The X-Files was created by Chris Carter and focuses on a pair of FBI agents investigating cases with links to the paranormal. At the 1997 ceremony Horton and the rest of the production team were nominated for the Primetime Emmy Award for Outstanding Drama Series for their work on the fourth season. He remained in this role for the fifth season in 1997 and then left the series at the close of the fifth season in 1998. The production team were again nominated for the Emmy Award for Outstanding Drama Series at the 1998 ceremony for their work on the fifth season.

Horton also worked on another series created by Chris Carter throughout this time; Millennium. He joined the crew as a co-executive producer for the first season in 1996. He also wrote three episodes of the series: season two's "A Room with No View", and season three's "Skull and Bones" and "Goodbye to All That".

=== Smallville ===
Serving as co-executive producer for the first season of Smallville, Horton was promoted executive producer as of the second season, remaining on the show until the season seven finale. In addition, he wrote the script for the season three episode "Whisper", and directed the season seven episode "Descent".

=== Additional series ===
In 1999 Horton served as co-executive producer of the short-lived series The Strip and the following year he was executive producer for the likewise short-lived Bull. In 2011 he was billed consulting producer for the fifth episode of Terra Nova, "Bylaw".

== Awards and nominations ==
- 1997 Emmy Award for Outstanding Drama Series for The X-files season 4
- 1998 Emmy Award for Outstanding Drama Series for The X-files season 5
