= Brittany Tiplady =

Canadian actress

- Born: Brittany Alexandra Tiplady; January 21, 1991 (age 35); Richmond, British Columbia, Canada
- Years active: 1994–2009

Brittany Alexandra Tiplady (born January 21, 1991) is a Canadian actress best known for her role as Jordan Black in the television series Millennium (1996–99). She won a 1998 Young Artist Award for Best Performance in a TV Drama Series – Supporting Actress. She also played the role of Maggie in the 2007 film Hot Rod.

At age nine, she played a supporting role in For All Time, as Mary Brown, the daughter of Newspaper Editor Mrs Laura Brown.

Her brother Avery also performed on television and in a film while he was young. His most recent role was in 2007.
