= Frank Black (character) =

Fictional character in television series Millennium

- Lance Henriksen as Frank Black in the television series Millennium
- First appearance: "Pilot" (Millennium)
- Last appearance: "Millennium" (The X-Files)
- Created by: Chris Carter
- Portrayed by: Lance Henriksen

In-universe information
- Gender: Male
- Occupation: FBI Special Agent
- Spouse: Catherine Black
- Children: Jordan Black (daughter)
- Affiliated with: Millennium Group

Frank Black is a fictional character in the crime-thriller television series Millennium. Black serves as the primary character of the series, which centers on his investigation into unusual crimes as part of the private investigative organization the Millennium Group. Black appeared in all but one of the series' sixty-seven episodes, with "Anamnesis" being the exception; the character was portrayed by Lance Henriksen throughout the series.

The character of Black was conceived by series creator Chris Carter as a modern Western hero, and has been considered the main constant throughout the series' changes in tone and direction. Henriksen was described by Carter as his "first and last" choice for the role, and has garnered critical acclaim for his portrayal, including three Golden Globe Award nominations.

== Character arc ==
Frank Black (Lance Henriksen) started his career as an offender profiler for the Federal Bureau of Investigation (FBI), where his unusual gift for empathising with the killers he was investigating aided in their capture. However, Black retires when he finds that his family—wife Catherine (Megan Gallagher) and daughter Jordan (Brittany Tiplady)—are being threatened by an unknown stalker, who is mailing polaroid photographs of the family to Black. After retiring from the FBI, Black moves to Seattle, Washington, and begins to consult for the Millennium Group, a private investigative organisation that aid law enforcement in violent criminal cases.

Despite the change in career, the stalker (Doug Hutchison) catches up with Black, kidnapping Catherine. Black is able to track them down and rescue Catherine, stabbing the stalker to death in the process. Disturbed by both the abduction and Black's rage, Catherine moves out of their family home with Jordan for a time. Before they can reconcile, Catherine dies in a virus outbreak orchestrated by the Millennium Group, who Black discovers are attempting to control the possibility of the end of the world at the turn of the millennium. Disgusted by the group's motives and actions, Black breaks rank and returns to work with the FBI in order to take them down.

Working with his new partner Emma Hollis (Klea Scott), Black finds himself struggling to combat the far-reaching influence of the Millennium Group. Due to the workings of the Group, Black is framed for the death of a fellow agent, prompting his resignation from the FBI and fleeing Washington D.C., with Jordan; likewise, Hollis is convinced to abandon Black and work with the Group. Several months later, Black is able to work with FBI agents Fox Mulder (David Duchovny) and Dana Scully (Gillian Anderson) to foil a last-ditch effort by the Group to bring about the end of the world; vindicated, he reunites with Jordan after the case.

== Conceptual history ==
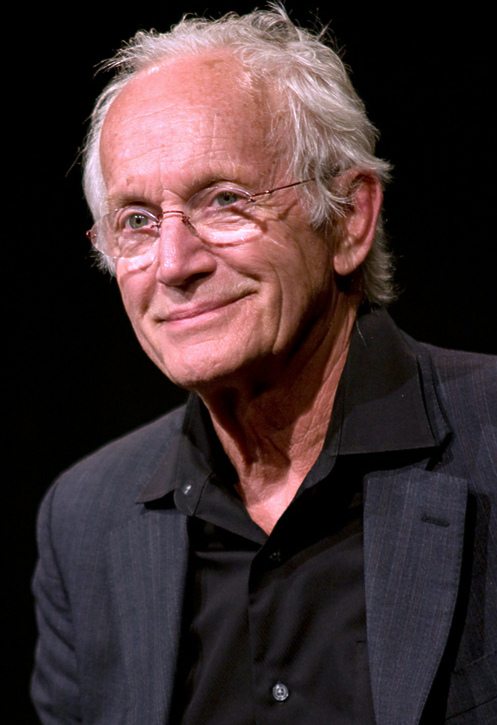
Henriksen was drawn to Millennium after reading its "vivid and edgy" pilot script.

Millennium's creator Chris Carter conceived Frank Black's character early in the series' genesis, knowing that he wanted to build the show around a retired law enforcement agent; the tone of Millennium came to Carter later in the process but shaped Black's character. Carter saw Black as an archetypal Western hero, describing him as "self-reliant, quiet, capable, dangerous" and comparing him to the title character of the 1953 film Shane. Actor William Hurt was considered for the role early in the conception of the series, although Carter denies that Hurt was seriously approached for the part, saying Henriksen was their "first and last choice". David Nutter, a frequent director for the series, described Henriksen as an "everyman" who appears to have "seen hell, and has reached for heaven but not often had it".

When Henriksen first received the script for "Pilot", he was impressed with what he saw as "vivid and edgy" writing, but was incredulous as the possibility of it being a television script, having initially mistaken it for a feature film. He also held reservations about working on television, as he was primarily a known for acting in films. The initial casting of Henriksen was not well received by executives at Fox Broadcasting Company, who had envisioned the lead role being played by "someone hot and in his mid-thirties, at worst" according to producer Ken Horton.

Producer John Peter Kousakis has noted that Black remained the main constant throughout the series, as each season featured a marked change in tone and plotting. Black appeared in every episode of the series bar one—the second season episode "Anamnesis" did not feature the character at all, focussing instead on another Millennium Group member. Henriksen used the break from production to take a trip to Hawaii. Following the cancellation of Millennium, character of Black—again portrayed by Henriksen—appeared in "Millennium", an episode of The X-Files which served as a crossover between the two programmes.

== Reception ==
Henriksen's portrayal of Black has been met with a positive reception. Henriksen was nominated for the Golden Globe Award for Best Actor in a Television Drama for each of the series' three seasons, without winning. Henriksen's first loss was to David Duchovny's role as Fox Mulder in The X-Files, followed by a loss to Anthony Edwards as ER's Mark Greene, and finally coming in behind Dylan McDermott's portrayal of Bobby Donnell in The Practice.

Writing for The A.V. Club, Zack Handlen noted that "Henriksen invests [Black's] world-weariness with a soothing, almost beautiful patience, and those few moments of delight he's allowed on the show [...] are sincere instead of cloying". DVD Talk's Randy Miller considered the character to have been "masterfully played" by Henriksen. Robert Shearman and Lars Pearson, in their book Wanting to Believe: A Critical Guide to The X-Files, Millennium & The Lone Gunmen, felt that Henriksen "seiz[ed] the part with a confidence that makes him immediately a more credible character" than Fox Mulder and Dana Scully, the lead roles in Millennium's sister show The X-Files. Writing for Slant magazine, Keith Uhlich described Henriksen's portrayal of Black as "the perfect actorly complement to Carter's thematic obsessions", calling the character a "mortal survivalist pushing ever-forward, even in the face of the devil's idle temptations".

== Footnotes ==
=== References ===
- Shapiro, Marc (2000). All Things: The Official Guide to the X-Files Volume 6. Harper Prism. ISBN 9780061076114.
- Shearman, Robert; Pearson, Lars (2009). Wanting to Believe: A Critical Guide to The X-Files, Millennium & The Lone Gunmen. Mad Norwegian Press. ISBN 978-0975944691.
- Carter, Chris, Horton, Ken, Spotnitz, Frank, Henriksen, Lance, Gallagher, Megan, Nutter, David, Snow, Mark, Peter Kousakis, John, Freeborn, Mark, McLachlan, Robert, Johannessen, Chip and J. Wright, Thomas (2004). Order in Chaos, Making Millennium Season One (DVD). Millennium: The Complete Second Season: 20th Century Fox Home Entertainment.
- Carter, Chris, Kousakis, John Peter, Henriksen, Lance, Perry, Michael R., Horton, Ken, Wright, Thomas J., Snow, Mark, Johannessen, Chip, Cloke, Kristen, Gallagher, Megan, Spotnitz, Frank, Freeborn, Mark (2004). The Turn of the Tide: The Making of Season 2 (DVD). Millennium: The Complete Second Season: 20th Century Fox Home Entertainment.
