= Millennium Group =

Fictional secret society in Millennium

The ouroboros is the symbol of the Millennium Group.

The Millennium Group is a fictional secret society featured in the crime thriller television series Millennium, and briefly on The X-Files. Having begun life as a Christian sect at the end of the 1st century AD, the Group grew into a far-reaching network which, as the 3rd millennium approached, presented itself as a private investigative firm liaising with law enforcement organizations. Despite being fraught with internal schisms, the Group tried on several occasions to artificially instigate the end of the world as the year 2000 approached.

The Millennium Group's role as an investigative organization was based on the real-life Academy Group, a society of retired law enforcement agents in the United States. The presentation of the Group varied as the series progressed, with its role changing from that of a benevolent investigative group to an antagonistic mystic sect. The Millennium Group has been met with negative responses, with its vacillating depiction being a focus of criticism both from critics and from series star Lance Henriksen.

== Fictional history ==
The Millennium Group first started life as an early Christian sect around the year 100 AD. By the late 10th century, the Group had adopted the ouroboros as its symbol, and the phrase "this is who we are" as a motto. However, around this time schisms within the group began to form as members fought for control of an artifact—the preserved hand of a saint said to be capable of ultimately defeating the devil. Despite these internal rivalries, the group persisted into the 20th century. The Group's modern organization stems from J. Edgar Hoover, the director of the Federal Bureau of Investigation, who began the process of turning the Group's attention to criminal investigation in order to monitor individuals and societal trends.

As the 3rd millennium approached, the Group's internal differences began to manifest into two factions—the "Roosters", who believed in a religiously eschatological view of the end of the world, and the "Owls", who believed the world would end with a secular natural disaster. Attempting to instigate the end of the world artificially, the Rooster faction began to develop a lethal virus; in 1998 they released this virus in the Pacific Northwest, killing upwards of seventy people before the outbreak was contained. A year later, a vastly depleted Millennium Group staged one last attempt to trigger the apocalypse, resurrecting deceased members in order to create the Four Horsemen of the Apocalypse; when this plot was foiled by the FBI Agents Fox Mulder and Dana Scully, it was believed to have caused the dissolution of the Group.

== Production ==
James Wong's research into Freemasonry inspired aspects of the Millennium Group.

The inspiration for the Millennium Group was a real-life organization called the Academy Group, which consisted of retired law enforcement agents working as a private investigative firm. Millennium's creator Chris Carter had come to know members of the Academy Group through contacts he had made with the Federal Bureau of Investigation while researching his earlier television series The X-Files. The Academy Group focused on offender profiling, which shaped the main Millennium Group characters of Frank Black (Lance Henriksen) and Peter Watts (Terry O'Quinn). Describing his initial inception of the Group, Carter has stated "they believe that all this random violence we see these days, there may actually be some order in the chaos [...] These guys think that, if they care enough, that they can stem the tide of this thing".

In the series' second season, new executive producers Glen Morgan and James Wong began to explore a new direction for the Group, moving away from its investigative function and giving a more religious focus. The tone of the second season focused more on the supernatural, showing the Group dealing with demonic forces more than the serial killers of the first season. Producer Ken Horton felt that the increased focus on the Group in the second season arose as the first season's use of serial killers as episodic antagonists had "overpowered" its storytelling, making it necessary to turn the show's attention elsewhere instead; the focus switched from external forces and villains to the internal workings of the Group. The introduction of schisms within the Group was inspired by Wong's research into the Knights Templar and Freemasonry, as he considered these secretive organizations to have mirrored the way he wanted to present the Group, and he felt each contained factions or reactionary elements which he wanted to recreate.

During the third season, the Millennium Group became the series' chief villains, playing an antagonistic role against Frank Black rather than the supportive role they had previously played. Series star Lance Henriksen, who portrayed Black, felt that this change was unnecessary and damaged the series, as it discarded the work that had been done to "build up" the Group in previous seasons. Henriksen would later state his belief that the "idea of a cultish kind of Millennium Group [...] just about destroyed the show".

== Reception ==
Critical opinions of the Millennium Group's role within the series have generally been negative, tending to focus on their inconsistent presentation. Writing in the collection Back to Frank Black: A Return to Chris Carter's Millennium, author Joseph Maddrey found that the changing nature of the Group's aims and methods seemed contradictory, writing that "over the course of Seasons Two and Three, the Millennium Group appears to become more dedicated to promoting fear of the future than to fighting it". In another essay in this collection, Gordon Roberts described the Group as "endlessly fascinating", and compared the Group to an organized crime syndicate, likening its requirement of continued devotion to the family unit.

Keith Uhlich, writing for Slant magazine, felt that the "reinvention of the Millennium Group from a criminal consulting firm to an ancient, protective sect" did not fit with Carter's typical character development, which focussed on individuals and the careers that "define their existence". The A.V. Club's Zack Handlen felt that the third season's focus on a villainous Group reduced them to "yet another cabal with seemingly limitless influence and power", describing them as "just another one of Carter’s beloved shadowy conspiracies".

== Footnotes ==
=== References ===
- Carter, Chris; Horton, Ken, Spotnitz, Frank; Henriksen, Lance; Gallagher, Megan; Nutter, David; Snow, Mark; Peter Kousakis, John, Freeborn, Mark, McLachlan, Robert; Johannessen, Chip and J. Wright, Thomas (2004). Order in Chaos, Making Millennium Season One (DVD). Millennium: The Complete Second Season: 20th Century Fox Home Entertainment.
- Carter, Chris; Kousakis, John Peter; Henriksen, Lance; Perry, Michael R.; Horton, Ken; Wright, Thomas J.; Snow, Mark; Johannessen, Chip; Cloke, Kristen; Gallagher, Megan; Spotnitz, Frank; Freeborn, Mark (2004). The Turn of the Tide: The Making of Season 2 (DVD). Millennium: The Complete Second Season: 20th Century Fox Home Entertainment.
- Carter, Chris; Perry, Michael R.; McLachlan, Robert, Johannessen, Chip; Horton, Ken; Henriksen, Lance and Scott, Klea (2004). End Game: Making Millennium Season Three (DVD). Millennium: The Complete Third Season: 20th Century Fox Home Entertainment.
- Donovan, Barna William (2011). Conspiracy Films: A Tour of Dark Places in the American Conscious. McFarland. ISBN 978-0786486151.
- McLean, James; Henriksen, Lance; Spotnitz, Frank; Carter, Chris (2012). Chamberlain, Adam; Dixon, Brian A. (eds.). Back to Frank Black. Fourth Horseman Press. ISBN 978-0988392298.
