= List of Millennium episodes =

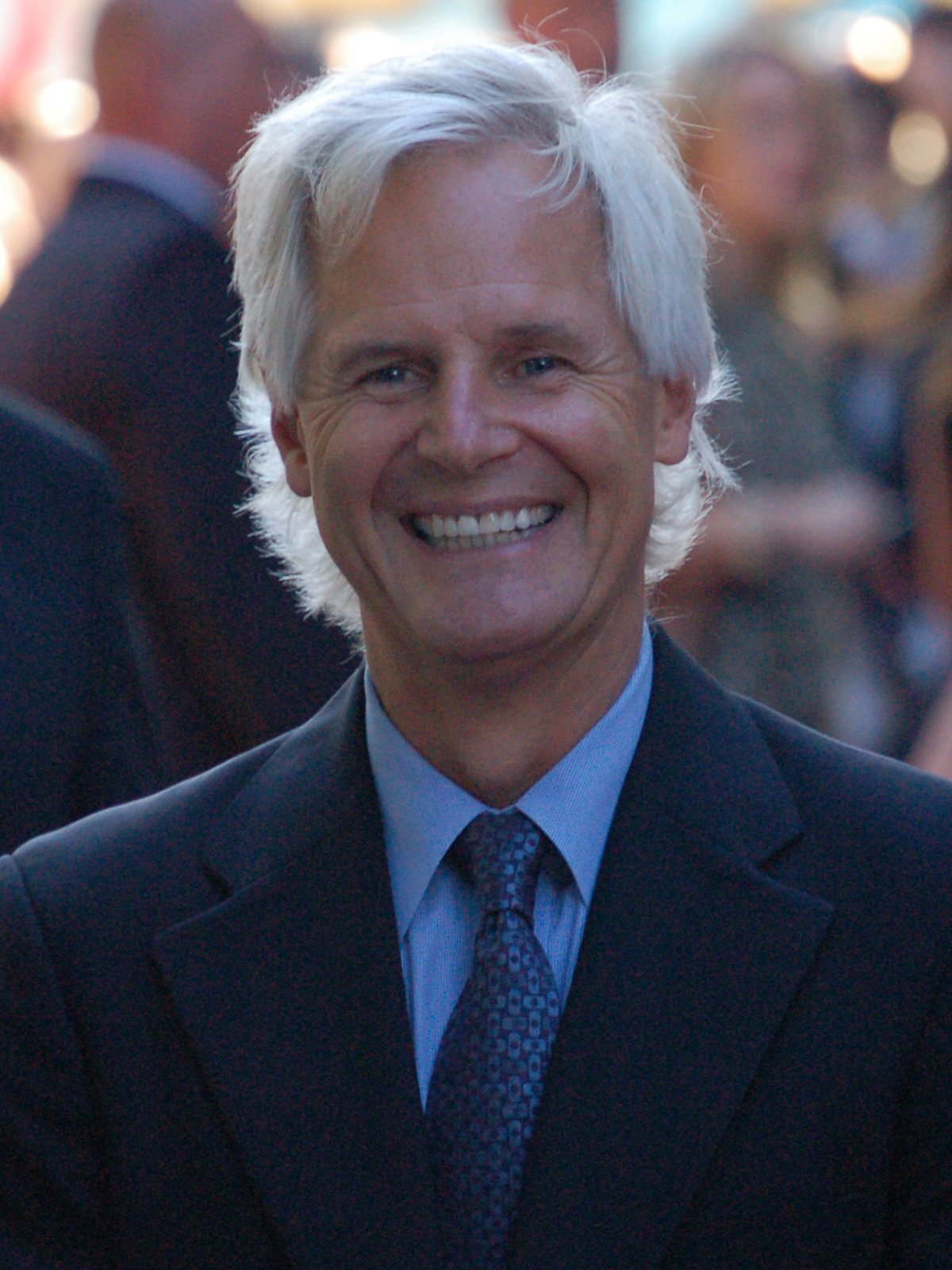
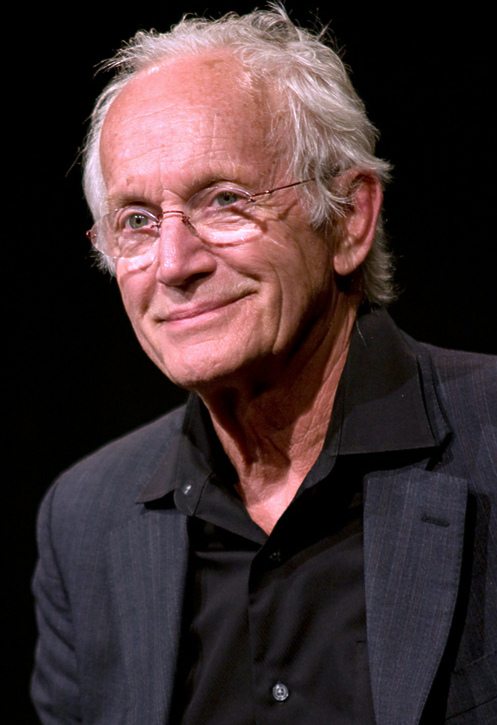
Millennium was created by screenwriter Chris Carter (left) and starred Lance Henriksen (right).

Millennium is an American crime-thriller television series which was broadcast between 1996 and 1999. Created by Chris Carter, the series aired on Fox for three seasons with a total of sixty-seven episodes. Millennium starred Lance Henriksen, Megan Gallagher, Klea Scott, and Brittany Tiplady. Henriksen portrayed Frank Black, an offender profiler who worked for the Millennium Group, a private investigative organisation. Black retired from the Federal Bureau of Investigation to move his wife (Gallagher) and daughter (Tiplady) to Seattle, where he began to consult on criminal cases for the Group. After his wife's death, he returned to the FBI to work with new partner Emma Hollis (Scott) to discredit the Group.

Millennium's genesis stemmed from "Irresistible", a second-season episode of The X-Files penned by Carter. Influence was also drawn from the works of Nostradamus, and the increasing popular interest in eschatology ahead of the coming millennium. The series began airing in the Friday timeslot formerly occupied by The X-Files. "Pilot", the debut episode, was heavily promoted by Fox, and brought in over a quarter of the total audience during its broadcast.

The series also attracted a high degree of critical praise, earning a People's Choice Award for "Favorite New TV Dramatic Series" in its first year. At the beginning of the second season, Carter handed over control of the series to Glen Morgan and James Wong, with whom he had previously worked on both Millennium's first season and several seasons of The X-Files. Despite its promising start, however, ratings for Millennium after the pilot remained consistently low, and it was cancelled after three seasons. However, an episode of The X-Files' seventh season, titled "Millennium", was written to bookend the series; the episode was later included in home releases of the third season.

== Series overview ==
Season	Episodes	Originally released	
Season	Episodes	First released	Last released
1	22	October 25, 1996	May 16, 1997
2	23	September 19, 1997	May 15, 1998
3	22	October 2, 1998	May 21, 1999
The X-Files – "Millennium"		November 28, 1999	

== Episodes ==
=== Season 1 (1996–97) ===
No. overall	No. in season	Title	Directed by	Written by	Original release date	Prod. code	US viewers (millions)
1	1	"Pilot"	David Nutter	Chris Carter	October 25, 1996	4C79	17.73
2	2	"Gehenna"	David Nutter	Chris Carter	November 1, 1996	4C01	11.9
3	3	"Dead Letters"	Thomas J. Wright	Glen Morgan & James Wong	November 8, 1996	4C02	12.4
4	4	"The Judge"	Randall Zisk	Ted Mann	November 15, 1996	4C04	11.0
5	5	"522666"	David Nutter	Glen Morgan & James Wong	November 22, 1996	4C05	11.2
6	6	"Kingdom Come"	Winrich Kolbe	Jorge Zamacona	November 29, 1996	4C03	11.5
7	7	"Blood Relatives"	Jim Charleston	Chip Johannessen	December 6, 1996	4C06	8.5
8	8	"The Well-Worn Lock"	Ralph Hemecker	Chris Carter	December 20, 1996	4C07	10.0
9	9	"Wide Open"	Jim Charleston	Charles Holland	January 3, 1997	4C08	10.00
10	10	"The Wild and the Innocent"	Thomas J. Wright	Jorge Zamacona	January 10, 1997	4C10	10.6
11	11	"Weeds"	Michael Pattinson	Frank Spotnitz	January 24, 1997	4C09	11.60
12	12	"Loin Like a Hunting Flame"	David Nutter	Ted Mann	January 31, 1997	4C11	11.98
13	13	"Force Majeure"	Winrich Kolbe	Chip Johannessen	February 7, 1997	4C12	10.72
14	14	"The Thin White Line"	Thomas J. Wright	Glen Morgan & James Wong	February 14, 1997	4C13	10.32
15	15	"Sacrament"	Michael W. Watkins	Frank Spotnitz	February 21, 1997	4C14	9.57
16	16	"Covenant"	Roderick J. Pridy	Robert Moresco	March 21, 1997	4C16	10.22
17	17	"Walkabout"	Cliff Bole	Chip Johannessen & Tim Tankosic	March 28, 1997	4C15	9.51
18	18	"Lamentation"	Winrich Kolbe	Chris Carter	April 18, 1997	4C17	10.00
19	19	"Powers, Principalities, Thrones and Dominions"	Thomas J. Wright	Ted Mann & Harold Rosenthal	April 25, 1997	4C18	10.50
20	20	"Broken World"	Winrich Kolbe	Robert Moresco & Patrick Harbinson	May 2, 1997	4C19	10.30
21	21	"Maranatha"	Peter Markle	Chip Johannessen	May 9, 1997	4C20	8.94
22	22	"Paper Dove"	Thomas J. Wright	Ted Mann & Walon Green	May 16, 1997	4C21	9.83

=== Season 2 (1997–98) ===
No. overall	No. in season	Title	Directed by	Written by	Original release date	Prod. code	US viewers (millions)
23	1	"The Beginning and the End"	Thomas J. Wright	Glen Morgan & James Wong	September 19, 1997	5C01	12.09
24	2	"Beware of the Dog"	Allen Coulter	Glen Morgan & James Wong	September 26, 1997	5C02	9.87
25	3	"Sense and Antisense"	Thomas J. Wright	Chip Johannessen	October 3, 1997	5C03	10.09
26	4	"Monster"	Perry Lang	Glen Morgan & James Wong	October 17, 1997	5C04	8.93
27	5	"A Single Blade of Grass"	Rodman Flender	Erin Maher & Kay Reindl	October 24, 1997	5C05	9.93
28	6	"The Curse of Frank Black"	Ralph Hemecker	Glen Morgan & James Wong	October 31, 1997	5C07	8.54
29	7	"19:19"	Thomas J. Wright	Glen Morgan & James Wong	November 7, 1997	5C06	9.13
30	8	"The Hand of St. Sebastian"	Thomas J. Wright	Glen Morgan & James Wong	November 14, 1997	5C08	10.10
31	9	"Jose Chung's Doomsday Defense"	Darin Morgan	Darin Morgan	November 21, 1997	5C09	8.04
32	10	"Midnight of the Century"	Dwight Little	Kay Reindl & Erin Maher	December 19, 1997	5C11	7.89
33	11	"Goodbye Charlie"	Ken Fink	Richard Whitley	January 9, 1998	5C10	8.91
34	12	"Luminary"	Thomas J. Wright	Chip Johannessen	January 23, 1998	5C12	9.15
35	13	"The Mikado"	Roderick Pridy	Michael R. Perry	February 6, 1998	5C13	7.92
36	14	"The Pest House"	Allen Coulter	Glen Morgan & James Wong	February 27, 1998	5C15	8.61
37	15	"Owls"	Thomas J. Wright	Glen Morgan & James Wong	March 6, 1998	5C14	8.11
38	16	"Roosters"	Thomas J. Wright	Glen Morgan & James Wong	March 13, 1998	5C16	8.41
39	17	"Siren"	Allen Coulter	Glen Morgan & James Wong	March 20, 1998	5C17	8.86
40	18	"In Arcadia Ego"	Thomas J. Wright	Chip Johannessen	April 3, 1998	5C18	8.68
41	19	"Anamnesis"	John Peter Kousakis	Kay Reindl & Erin Maher	April 17, 1998	5C19	8.28
42	20	"A Room with No View"	Thomas J. Wright	Ken Horton	April 24, 1998	5C20	7.34
43	21	"Somehow, Satan Got Behind Me"	Darin Morgan	Darin Morgan	May 1, 1998	5C21	8.74
44	22	"The Fourth Horseman"	Dwight Little	Glen Morgan & James Wong	May 8, 1998	5C22	6.68
45	23	"The Time Is Now"	Thomas J. Wright	Glen Morgan & James Wong	May 15, 1998	5C23	7.01

=== Season 3 (1998–99) ===
No. overall	No. in season	Title	Directed by	Written by	Original release date	Prod. code	US viewers (millions)
46	1	"The Innocents"	Thomas J. Wright	Michael Duggan	October 2, 1998	3ABC01	7.75
47	2	"Exegesis"	Ralph Hemecker	Chip Johannessen	October 9, 1998	3ABC02	6.93
48	3	"TEOTWAWKI"	Thomas J. Wright	Chris Carter & Frank Spotnitz	October 16, 1998	3ABC03	6.88
49	4	"Closure"	Daniel Sackheim	Larry Andries	October 23, 1998	3ABC04	7.59
50	5	"...Thirteen Years Later"	Thomas J. Wright	Michael R. Perry	October 30, 1998	3ABC05	8.25
51	6	"Skull and Bones"	Paul Shapiro	Chip Johannessen & Ken Horton	November 6, 1998	3ABC06	7.58
52	7	"Through a Glass, Darkly"	Thomas J. Wright	Patrick Harbinson	November 13, 1998	3ABC07	7.40
53	8	"Human Essence"	Thomas J. Wright	Michael Duggan	December 11, 1998	3ABC09	6.78
54	9	"Omertà"	Paul Shapiro	Michael R. Perry	December 18, 1998	3ABC08	7.19
55	10	"Borrowed Time"	Dwight Little	Chip Johannessen	January 15, 1999	3ABC10	7.70
56	11	"Collateral Damage"	Thomas J. Wright	Michael R. Perry	January 22, 1999	3ABC11	8.51
57	12	"The Sound of Snow"	Paul Shapiro	Patrick Harbinson	February 5, 1999	3ABC12	7.29
58	13	"Antipas"	Thomas J. Wright	Chris Carter & Frank Spotnitz	February 12, 1999	3ABC13	6.52
59	14	"Matryoshka"	Arthur Forney	Erin Maher & Kay Reindl	February 19, 1999	3ABC14	5.6
60	15	"Forcing the End"	Thomas J. Wright	Marjorie David	March 19, 1999	3ABC15	6.52
61	16	"Saturn Dreaming of Mercury"	Paul Shapiro	Chip Johannessen & Jordan Hawley	April 9, 1999	3ABC16	6.45
62	17	"Darwin's Eye"	Ken Fink	Patrick Harbinson	April 16, 1999	3ABC18	6.56
63	18	"Bardo Thodol"	Thomas J. Wright	Chip Johannessen & Virginia Stock	April 23, 1999	3ABC17	5.64
64	19	"Seven and One"	Peter Markle	Chris Carter & Frank Spotnitz	April 30, 1999	3ABC19	5.60
65	20	"Nostalgia"	Thomas J. Wright	Michael R. Perry	May 7, 1999	3ABC20	6.54
66	21	"Via Dolorosa"	Paul Shapiro	Marjorie David & Patrick Harbinson	May 14, 1999	3ABC21	6.30
67	22	"Goodbye to All That"	Thomas J. Wright	Ken Horton & Chip Johannessen	May 21, 1999	3ABC22	6.08

=== "Millennium" (The X-Files) (1999) ===
No. overall	No. in season	Title	Directed by	Written by	Original release date	US viewers (millions)
143	4	"Millennium"	Thomas J. Wright	Vince Gilligan & Frank Spotnitz	November 28, 1999	15.09

== Footnotes ==
=== References ===
- Chris Carter, Ken Horton, Frank Spotnitz, Lance Henriksen, Megan Gallagher, David Nutter, Mark Snow, John Peter Kousakis, Mark Freeborn, Robert McLachlan, Chip Johannessen and Thomas J. Wright (2004). Order in Chaos: Making Millennium Season One (DVD). Millennium: The Complete First Season: Fox Home Entertainment.
- Genge, N. E. (1997a). Millennium: The Unofficial Companion. Century. ISBN 0-7126-7833-6.
- Shapiro, Marc (2000). All Things: The Official Guide to the X-Files Volume 6. Harper Prism. ISBN 0-06-107611-2.
- Shearman, Robert; Pearson, Lars (2009). Wanting to Believe: A Critical Guide to The X-Files, Millennium & The Lone Gunmen. Mad Norwegian Press. ISBN 978-0975944691.
- McLean, James; Henriksen, Lance; Spotnitz, Frank; Carter, Chris (2012). Chamberlain, Adam; Dixon, Brian A. (eds.). Back to Frank Black. Fourth Horseman Press. ISBN 978-0988392298.
