= Powers, Principalities, Thrones and Dominions =

- Millennium episode
- Episode no.: Season 1 Episode 19
- Directed by: Thomas J. Wright
- Written by: Ted Mann; Harold Rosenthal
- Production code: 4C18
- Original air date: April 25, 1997

Guest appearances
- Richard Cox as Alistair Pepper; Robin Gammell as Mike Atkins; Rodney Eastman as Sammael; Sarah-Jane Redmond as Lucy Butler; Stephen J. Lang as Bob Geibelhouse; Guy Fauchon as Martin; Dean P. Gibson as Phil Brice; Robert Moloney as Uniformed Cop Adams; Judith Maxie as Judge Myers; Allan Franz as Medical Examiner Anderson; Bonnie Hay as A.D.A. Mills; Alf Humphreys as Damon Rummer

Episode chronology
← Previous "Lamentation"	Next → "Broken World"
- Millennium season 1

"Powers, Principalities, Thrones and Dominions'" is the nineteenth episode of the first season of the American crime-thriller television series Millennium. It premiered on the Fox network on April 25, 1997. The episode was written by Ted Mann and Harold Rosenthal and directed by Thomas J. Wright. "Powers, Principalities, Thrones and Dominions" featured guest appearances by Sarah-Jane Redmond and Richard Cox.

Millennium Group consultant Frank Black (Lance Henriksen) is convinced to return to work after the death of a close friend. However, it soon becomes apparent that his first case back on the job is much deeper than he had expected.

"Powers, Principalities, Thrones and Dominions" features the final appearances in the series by both Bill Smitrovich and Robin Gammell. The episode has received mixed to positive reviews from critics, and was viewed by approximately 6.5 million households in its initial broadcast.

== Plot ==
The episode opens in medias res as Millennium Group consultant Frank Black (Lance Henriksen) runs out to a supermarket parking lot and witnesses a lawyer, Alistair Pepper (Richard Cox), being confronted over groceries by a man named Sammael (Rodney Eastman). Sammael raises his hand and a bolt of lightning arcs from his fingers to strike Pepper dead; however, when Black reaches Sammael, he finds a pistol at the killer's feet.

A few days earlier, fellow Group member Peter Watts (Terry O'Quinn) investigates a murder in a suburban home in which occult paraphernalia has been laid out in a disorganized manner. Watts contacts Black for help with the case. However, Black is still recovering from the murder of his friend Bob Bletcher (Bill Smitrovich), who was murdered in Black's home. Watts hangs up when he sees Sammael looking through his window, but by the time he can investigate, Sammael is gone.

Watts later shows Black a picture taken at the crime scene, with Sammael recognizable among a crowd of people. Elsewhere, a man named Martin (Guy Fauchon) is arrested after slitting a babysitter's throat at a public park; despite the seemingly random nature of the crime, Black believes that the man may be connected to Bletcher's murder. However, he soon starts to suspect that Martin may be innocent of the crime he has been arrested for. Black also has a dream in which a mutilated Bletcher tries and fails to speak to him, which leads Black to believe he has lost his psychic ability to see into the minds of others.

The case against Martin falters as evidence disappears and witnesses fail to identify him in a police lineup. Black is approached by Pepper, Martin's self-appointed lawyer, who extends Black an invitation to join his legal practice. Martin later claims in court to have killed Bletcher. Elsewhere, another Group member, Mike Atkins (Robin Gammell), receives a telephone call from someone pretending to be Black. Black suspects that the occult-oriented murder may have been committed to draw the Group, and Black, into the open again.

In his jail cell, Martin slits his own throat with a concealed razor blade; however, a coroner later finds that his death was caused by an aneurysm. Black believes that Pepper is somehow involved. Watts and Black find Atkins murdered in a hotel room, and chase a suspect down a fire escape and into a supermarket. Inside, Black finds Pepper, but as Pepper moves in and out of view, his appearance seems to change to that of Martin, and then of Lucy Butler (Sarah-Jane Redmond), the woman Black suspects to have killed Bletcher. Pepper leaves the supermarket and approaches his car, where he is confronted and killed by Sammael. As Black apprehends Sammael, he is told that Pepper was killed as a "consequence of his own error"; Black takes it to mean that there is a larger mystery to which his own involvement is only tangential.

== Production ==
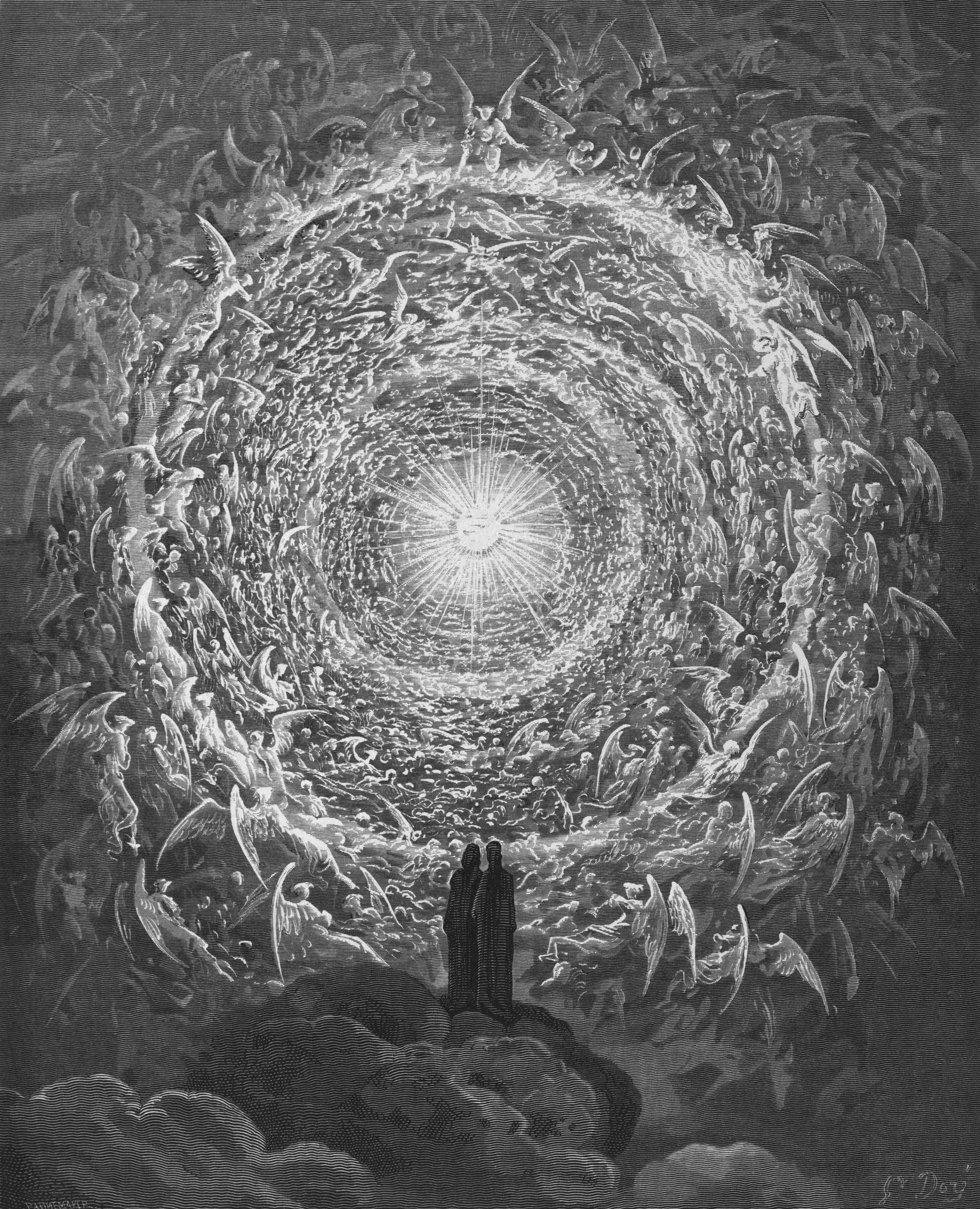
Christian angelic imagery features in the episode (Gustave Doré's illustration of Dante Alighieri's Paradiso pictured).

"Powers, Principalities, Thrones and Dominions" is the third of four episodes of Millennium to have been written by Ted Mann, who had previously written "The Judge" and "Loin Like a Hunting Flame", and would go on to write the first season finale "Paper Dove". Director Thomas J. Wright would go on to direct twenty-six episodes across all three seasons. Wright would also direct "Millennium", the series' crossover episode with its sister show The X-Files. "Powers, Principalities, Thrones and Dominions" is co-writer Harold Rosenthal's only credit throughout the series.

Both the title of the episode and the invocation spoken by the character of Sammael refer to four of the nine choirs of angels in Christian theology. Christian angelology holds that there are three groupings of three choirs each. The Thrones are the third-highest ranking choir, belonging to the group charged with attending to God, and are described as stern incarnations of holy justice. Dominions, the fourth-highest choir, belong to the group appointed to deal with God's creations. Dominions lead the lower orders and impart wisdom to humanity. Powers belong to the same tier as Dominions, and are tasked with countering the threat of temptation by the devil and demons. Principalities are the seventh-highest ranking choir and belong to the lowest grouping of angels, those most likely to appear to mankind. Principalities oversee those humans who rule over others, teaching kings and heads of families the skills needed to lead.

"Powers, Principalities, Thrones and Dominions" features the final appearance of the character Bob Bletcher. Smitrovich had first portrayed Bletcher in "Pilot", appearing intermittently throughout the first season. Bletcher was murdered in the previous episode, "Lamentation". The episode also features the death of Millennium Group member Mike Atkins, played by Robin Gammell, who had also portrayed the character in the earlier episode "Gehenna". Sarah-Jane Redmond, who had first portrayed Lucy Butler in "Lamentation", would return in the second season episode "A Room with No View", and the third season episodes "Antipas" and "Saturn Dreaming of Mercury".

== Broadcast and reception ==
"Frank's obvious grief over what happened, and the way that grief throws into doubt his own faith in his abilities, makes the most out of the murder in a way that never seems belabored or needlessly manipulative. It doesn't matter that I don't really give a damn about Bob. What matters is that Frank does, and that his guilt over Bob's death is gnawing away at his seemingly unshakable calm.".

— Zack Handlen on the handling of Bob Bletcher's murder

"Powers, Principalities, Thrones and Dominions" was first broadcast on the Fox Network on April 25, 1997. The episode earned a Nielsen rating of 6.7 during its original broadcast, meaning that 6.7 percent of households in the United States viewed the episode. This represented 6.5 million households, and left the episode the sixty-fifth most-viewed broadcast that week. (Note: Each ratings point represented 970,000 households during the 1996–1997 television season.)

"Powers, Principalities, Thrones and Dominions" received mostly positive reviews from critics. The A.V. Club's Zack Handlen rated the episode an A, describing it as "gleefully grim". Handlen felt that the episode represented the series coming into its own, noting that "Millennium, after weeks of hinting at possibilities without delivering much of anything, has finally started to give a real sense that yes, there is a lot of bad news happening, and it really does make a twisted kind of sense". Bill Gibron, writing for DVD Talk, rated the episode 3.5 out of 5, noting that it shared similar themes with the direction the series would take in its second season. Gibron described the episode as "spooky and somewhat surreal", adding that "the entire installment [sic] crackles with possibilities". Robert Shearman and Lars Pearson, in their book Wanting to Believe: A Critical Guide to The X-Files, Millennium & The Lone Gunmen, rated "Powers, Principalities, Thrones and Dominions" four stars out of five, describing it as being "surprising, intriguing, moody and pretentious". Shearman compared the episode thematically to Mann's earlier script for "The Judge", and noted that while the story "doesn't make for an especially comprehensible yarn, it does produce an episode that is genuinely uneasy viewing".

== Footnotes ==
=== References ===
- Genge, N. E. (1997). Millennium: The Unofficial Companion. Century. ISBN 0712678336.
- Genge, N. E. (1997). Millennium: The Unofficial Companion Volume Two. Century. ISBN 0712678697.
- Shearman, Robert; Pearson, Lars (2009). Wanting to Believe: A Critical Guide to The X-Files, Millennium & The Lone Gunmen. Mad Norwegian Press. ISBN 978-0975944691.
