= The Judge (Millennium) =

- Millennium episode
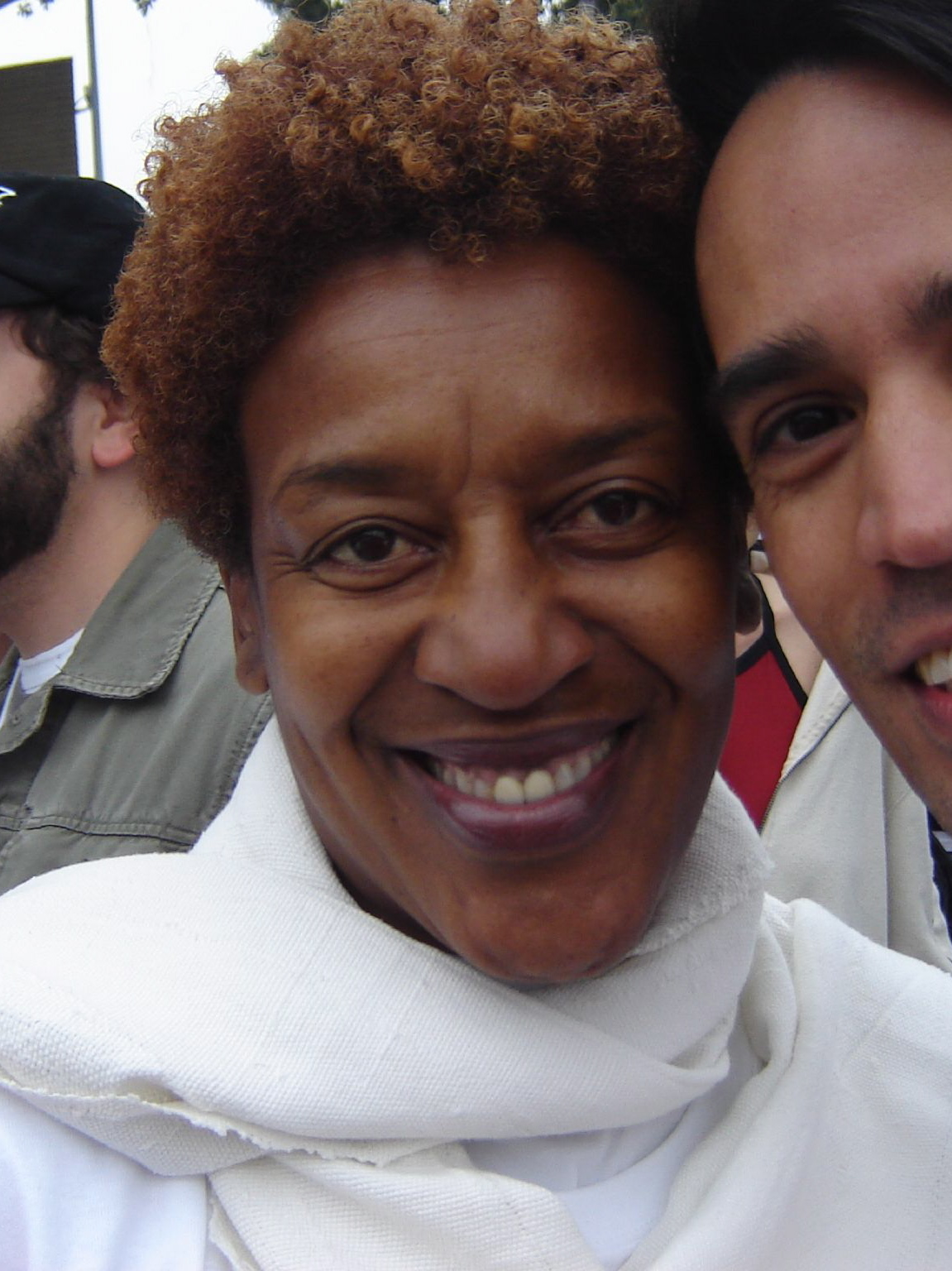
- Recurring guest star C. C. H. Pounder made her Millennium début in "The Judge".
- Episode no.: Season 1 Episode 4
- Directed by: Randall Zisk
- Written by: Ted Man
- Production code: 4C04
- Original air date: November 15, 1996

Guest appearances
- Bill Smitrovich as Lt. Bob Bletcher; Marshall Bell as The Judge; John Hawkes as Mike Bardale; Chris Ellis as Jim Penseyres; Stephen J. Lang as Det. Bob Giebelhouse; Brian Markinson as Detective Teeple; C. C. H. Pounder as Cheryl Andrews; J. R. Bourne as Carl Nearman; Donna White as Annie Tisman

Episode chronology
← Previous "Dead Letters"	Next → "522666"
- Millennium season 1

"'The Judge" is the fourth episode of the first season of the American crime-thriller television series Millennium. It premiered on the Fox network on November 15, 1996. The episode was written by Ted Mann, and directed by Randall Zisk. "The Judge" featured guest appearances by Marshall Bell, John Hawkes and C. C. H. Pounder.

Forensic profiler Frank Black (Lance Henriksen), a member of the private investigative organisation Millennium Group, is asked to investigate a vigilante (Bell) who uses newly released convicts to execute those he deems guilty.

"The Judge" begins with a quotation from Moby-Dick, a novel that the episode has been compared to thematically. Guest star Pounder would reappear several times in the series, while fellow guest Ellis made the last of his three appearances in this episode. The episode received mixed reviews from critics.

== Plot ==
In a bowling alley, ex-convict Carl Nearman (J. R. Bourne) watches another man eat his meal before following him outside, where he approaches and kills him. Elsewhere, Annie Tisman (Donna White) receives a human tongue in a package. The Millennium Group sends profiler Frank Black (Lance Henriksen) and pathologist Cheryl Andrews (C. C. H. Pounder) to investigate, as several people have received body parts in the mail. No connection between the recipients has been found, nor have the bodies the parts have been culled from.

Mike Bardale (John Hawkes), a violent repeat offender who has recently been released from prison again, is approached by a man calling himself The Judge (Marshall Bell). The Judge, a vigilante, offers Bardale a position in his "court", in which convicts are hired to mete out his version of justice against those he perceives as criminals. Bardale's first "execution" is that of his forebear, Nearman.

The body of the bowling alley victim is discovered, missing a tongue. He is identified as a retired police officer, Detective Mellen, who had given false testimony that had sent an innocent man to prison. Black realizes that the killer is motivated by the need to right wrongs such as this, killing those who have gotten away with crimes. Meanwhile, The Judge passes sentence on another victim—a slumlord whose negligence caused a tenant's death. Bardale is ordered to cut off the landlord's leg while he is still alive; the leg is later found at a postal depot in a package.

Forensic evidence on the package eventually leads to Bardale, and then to The Judge. The Judge is arrested for questioning and, knowing that there is not enough evidence to warrant holding him, he offers have Black work for him. Black refuses, but The Judge is released. Bardale is incensed that The Judge has manipulated the law to his own ends and passes sentence on him for hypocrisy. Finding Bardale alone in a farmhouse, Black discovers that Bardale has fed The Judge to his pigs.

== Production ==
Though neither knows where lie the nameless things of which the mystic sign gives forth such hints; yet with me, as with the colt, somewhere those things must exist. Though in many of its aspects this visible world seems formed in love, the invisible spheres were formed in fright.

—The episode's opening quote, from Herman Melville's Moby-Dick

"The Judge" is the first of four episodes of Millennium to be written by Ted Mann, who would go on to write "Loin Like a Hunting Flame", "Powers, Principalities, Thrones and Dominions" and the first-season finale "Paper Dove". The episode marks director Randall Zisk's only work for the series.

The episode features the first appearance by C. C. H. Pounder as Millennium Group pathologist Cheryl Andrews. Pounder would go on to make another four appearances as the character, appearing across all three seasons. "The Judge" also marked the final appearance by Chris Ellis as Group member Jim Penseyres; Ellis had previously appeared in "Gehenna" and "Dead Letters". John Hawkes, who portrays killer Mike Bardale in the episode, would later go on to work with Mann again on the series Deadwood, first reuniting on that series' first-season finale "Sold Under Sin".

The episode opens with a quotation from Herman Melville's 1851 novel Moby-Dick, taken from chapter forty-two, "The Whiteness of the Whale". Both Millennium and Moby-Dick have been described as "a basic conflict between good and evil". In addition, both are "focused on a then-modern view of the world".

== Reception ==
Also clear in this episode is just how little the show had figured out to use Catherine, as she mostly stumbles in to say, "Hey, one of my co-workers has a client who just got a TONGUE IN A BOX. You know anything about this?" before wandering off.

—The A.V. Club's Emily Todd VanDerWerff on the character of Catherine Black.

"The Judge" was first broadcast on the Fox Network on November 15, 1996; and earned a Nielsen rating of 7.6, meaning that roughly 7.6 percent of all television-equipped households were tuned in to the episode.

"The Judge" received mixed reviews from critics. Robert Shearman and Lars Pearson, in their book Wanting to Believe: A Critical Guide to The X-Files, Millennium & The Lone Gunmen, rated the episode one star out of five, finding its "contrived" plot to be "barely a subtle premise", and noting that "the script unfortunately elevates the lead villain to high camp". Shearman and Pearson felt that the subject of vigilantism was a suitable one for the series, and that it had "been bubbling under the surface every since the concept of the Millennium Group ... was first mentioned"; however, they ultimately felt that the episode contained "very little to engage the brain". Bill Gibron, writing for DVD Talk, rated "The Judge" 4 out of 5, describing it as being "a fine, moody episode". However, Gibron felt that Marshall Bell's character may have been better suited to a recurring role, rather than being killed off during the episode. Writing for The A.V. Club, Emily Todd VanDerWerff rated the episode a B−, praising the acting of both Bell and John Hawkes. However, VanDerWerff felt that "The Judge" showed Millennium to be struggling with its own concept, growing "staid" as a result of only having "the one color to play with".

== Footnotes ==
=== References ===
- Genge, N. E. (1997). Millennium: The Unofficial Companion. Century. ISBN 0-7126-7833-6.
- Shearman, Robert; Pearson, Lars (2009). Wanting to Believe: A Critical Guide to The X-Files, Millennium & The Lone Gunmen. Mad Norwegian Press. ISBN 978-0-9759446-9-1.
