= Millennium season 1 =

Millennium
- Season 1
- Season 1 DVD cover
- No. of episodes: 22

Release
- Original network: Fox
- Original release: October 25, 1996 – May 16, 1997

Season chronology
- Next → Season 2

The first season of the serial crime-thriller television series Millennium commenced airing in the United States on October 25, 1996, concluding on May 16, 1997, and consisting of twenty-two episodes. It tells the story of retired FBI Agent Frank Black (Lance Henriksen). Black has moved to Seattle, Washington with his family and has begun working with a mysterious organization known only as the Millennium Group. He investigates cases with members of the Group and the Seattle Police Department, contributing his remarkable capability of relating to the monsters responsible for horrific crimes. He finds that his daughter has inherited the same "gift" that he has, while the cases become increasingly more personal.

Critics received season one well. Although the show got the highest number of viewers for a pilot episode for the Fox Network at the time, it steadily dropped in the ratings, which led to it losing the Sunday slot to its sister show, The X-Files. The main cast of the show were Henriksen as Frank Black and Megan Gallagher as Catherine Black.

== Production ==
=== Development ===
The original idea behind Millennium came from an episode of The X-Files Chris Carter had written about a serial killer. The episode got Carter thinking about the "monsters" who lurked in the shadows. Later, he started to flesh out a character which would become Frank Black, but he was busy working with other projects at the time. In the mid-1990s, after the success of The X-Files, the Fox Network asked Carter if he could create another show for them.

Originally, the show was planned to include a new "murder mystery" each week, at the same time having a comprehensive storyline. So Carter created the idea of the new millennium, which could give the show its own "feel". He felt he "could capitalise" and at the same time have a new murder mystery every week with a "millennial" twist to it. He also wanted to explore "evil", not the "scientific approach" which was the psychological explanation of "evil". Carter wanted to explore evil through an "unscientific approach", an exploration where "the Bible" played an important role. While clearly stating that the show was not supposed to be heavily grounded in religious text, he felt in many ways that the Bible explained "things on various levels" and "not just in the modern scientific way."

=== Casting and characters ===
Chris Carter had envisioned Lance Henriksen portraying the character of Frank Black, long before he was ever contacted. Although Carter's colleagues responded positively to the selection, the Fox Network wanted someone younger to take the lead part. Fox asked William Hurt to play the lead role, but after finding out that Hurt had no interest in acting on television, Henriksen got the part.

When Henriksen first got the script, he mistook it for a film because of its "powerful" story. He was not fond of the idea of participating in a television project. Henriksen contacted Carter about the character; his first question was "How are you going to make this hero a hero? I mean, it is so dark, how are you going to handle this?" Carter replied saying that Frank was a hero because he was able to "stand-up" against all of this. Henriksen was also worried about the dark "feel" of the show, saying that all shows needs some glimpse of light at the end of the tunnel. According to Carter "The yellow house" was the light, which Henriksen later agreed upon.

Studio executive Ken Horton was very pleased with Megan Gallagher's acting experiences. After winning the audition, she was given a "secret script". Reacting positively towards the script, she later met up with Carter and David Nutter.

== Critical reception ==
Peter Wunstorf was nominated for an American Society of Cinematographers award for his work on the pilot episode. Lance Henriksen was nominated for a Golden Globe Award for his portrayal of Frank Black but lost to E.R. performer, Anthony Edwards. Co-star Brittany Tiplady was later nominated for a Young Artist Award but failed to win. The show itself was nominated for a People's Choice Award in the category "Favorite Television New Dramatic Series" but did not win. Robert McLachlan was nominated and won a Canadian Society of Cinematographers in 1997.

The first season was received well by critics. Keith Uhlich of Salon magazine called the season and series "Carter's greatest series", and that, "television work always improves in retrospect; his seemingly haphazard, on-the-fly narratives become more coherent when taken out of the hellish, commercial break-happy context wherein they spawned". Paul Katz of Entertainment Weekly said, "Despite the unapologetic bleakness" of the show, it was Lance Henriksen performance that was the "real killer". Mark Rahner from The Seattle Times said the "X-Files follow-up was uncompromisingly grim, fascinating, cinematically crafted", and that the show was "years ahead" of such "forensic mysteries" as CSI: Crime Scene Investigation. USA Today writer Matt Roush said "With nightmare visions of bleeding walls, charred bodies, decapitations and a grisly live burial", the show took a new "grim view" on "drama".

Although the season premiere received good ratings, the series gradually lost viewers as they were reportedly "turned off by the morose and unnerving story lines."

== Main cast ==
=== Starring ===
- Lance Henriksen as Frank Black
- Megan Gallagher as Catherine Black

=== Recurring ===
- Terry O'Quinn as Peter Watts
- Brittany Tiplady as Jordan Black
- Stephen J. Lang as Det. Bob Giebelhouse
- Bill Smitrovich as Lt. Robert Bletcher

== Episodes ==
No. overall	No. in season	Title	Directed by	Written by	Original release date	Prod. code	US viewers (millions)
1	1	"Pilot"	David Nutter	Chris Carter	October 25, 1996	4C79	17.73
Frank Black and his family move to Seattle where he tracks a serial killer whose savagely slain victims include an exotic dancer.
2	2	"Gehenna"	David Nutter	Chris Carter	November 1, 1996	4C01	11.9
Gruesome cult slayings bring Frank Black to San Francisco, where he experiences a life changing encounter with evil.
3	3	"Dead Letters"	Thomas J. Wright	Glen Morgan & James Wong	November 8, 1996	4C02	12.4
On a murder case in Portland, Oregon, Frank is uneasily teamed with a troubled Group member.
4	4	"The Judge"	Randall Zisk	Ted Mann	November 15, 1996	4C04	11.0
Gruesome remains and other evidence provide Frank Black with a lead to a murderous avenger who persuades ex-cons to do his dirty work. John Hawkes and Marshall Bell guest star.
5	5	"522666"	David Nutter	Glen Morgan & James Wong	November 22, 1996	4C05	11.2
A deadly explosion in a crowded Washington, D.C. bar is traced to a cunning bomber who toys with authorities and aims to strike again.
6	6	"Kingdom Come"	Winrich Kolbe	Jorge Zamacona	November 29, 1996	4C03	11.5
Shattered faith figures in the motive for the slayings of clerics by a killer, whom Frank tracks with a Group member he worked with on a similar unsolved case.
7	7	"Blood Relatives"	Jim Charleston	Chip Johannessen	December 6, 1996	4C06	8.5
In her role as a clinical social worker, Catherine Black lends her expertise to a heinous case: the slayings of the recently bereaved.
8	8	"The Well-Worn Lock"	Ralph Hemecker	Chris Carter	December 20, 1996	4C07	10.0
A case of incest draws Catherine to the plight of a troubled woman who has kept a secret for 23 years: she was violated by her well-respected father.
9	9	"Wide Open"	Jim Charleston	Charles Holland	January 3, 1997	4C08	10.00
A shadowy killer commits heinous murders, leaving clues in the memory of a terrorized child who was forced to witness the death of her parents.
10	10	"The Wild and the Innocent"	Thomas J. Wright	Jorge Zamacona	January 10, 1997	4C10	10.6
A reopened murder case takes Frank Black to Missouri, where he winds up on a different mission, pursuing a young girl and her boyfriend as they go on a murderous search for her baby.
11	11	"Weeds"	Michael Pattinson	Frank Spotnitz	January 24, 1997	4C09	11.60
In a guarded, well-to-do community, the kidnappings and brutalizations of teenage boys lead Frank to suspect an avenging resident.
12	12	"Loin Like a Hunting Flame"	David Nutter	Ted Mann	January 31, 1997	4C11	11.98
In Colorado, Frank Black and an insightful associate track a killer who is driven by sexual neuroses and who uses mood-altering drugs to gain control of his victims.
13	13	"Force Majeure"	Winrich Kolbe	Chip Johannessen	February 7, 1997	4C12	10.72
An enigmatic man obsessed with the Millennium Group haunts Frank on a strange case involving planetary alignments, genetic cloning and Judgment Day. Brad Dourif guest stars.
14	14	"The Thin White Line"	Thomas J. Wright	Glen Morgan & James Wong	February 14, 1997	4C13	10.32
Black is haunted by a case he worked on twenty years ago involving a serial killer who murdered three FBI agents on a stake-out that he participated in.
15	15	"Sacrament"	Michael W. Watkins	Frank Spotnitz	February 21, 1997	4C14	9.57
The abduction of his sister-in-law embroils Frank Black in an intensely personal case that is linked to a vicious sex offender recently released from an asylum.
16	16	"Covenant"	Roderick J. Pridy	Robert Moresco	March 21, 1997	4C16	10.22
In Utah, Frank is hired to render a profile of an admitted killer that will support a death sentence but soon comes to believe that the man's confession was a lie.
17	17	"Walkabout"	Cliff Bole	Chip Johannessen & Tim Tankosic	March 28, 1997	4C15	9.51
An Internet connection with a disturbed doctor leads an amnesiac Frank Black into a murder case linked to experimental drugs that drastically heighten anxiety.
18	18	"Lamentation"	Winrich Kolbe	Chris Carter	April 18, 1997	4C17	10.00
Black investigates the disappearance of a former nemesis and learns that his family may be the target of a murdering nurse.
19	19	"Powers, Principalities, Thrones and Dominions"	Thomas J. Wright	Ted Mann & Harold Rosenthal	April 25, 1997	4C18	10.50
Still reeling from a tragic loss, Frank is swept into a bizarre case of ritualistic slayings that involves an enigmatic lawyer and unearthly occurrences.
20	20	"Broken World"	Winrich Kolbe	Robert Moresco & Patrick Harbinson	May 2, 1997	4C19	10.30
Evidence found whilst investigating the vicious murders of domesticated horses in North Dakota leads Black to suspect the genesis of a psychosexual killer, who soon preys upon humans.
21	21	"Maranatha"	Peter Markle	Chip Johannessen	May 9, 1997	4C20	8.94
In a Russian community in Brooklyn, Frank joins forces with a Moscow cop to investigate gruesome slayings linked to the 1986 Chernobyl disaster—and to biblical prophecy.
22	22	"Paper Dove"	Thomas J. Wright	Ted Mann & Walon Green	May 16, 1997	4C21	9.83
Vacationing in the D.C. area, Frank tries to clear an admiral's son of murder in a case that is linked to a serial killer.

== Footnotes ==
=== References ===
- Genge, N. E. (1997a). Millennium: The Unofficial Companion. Century. ISBN 0-7126-7833-6.
- Genge, N. E. (1997b). Millennium: The Unofficial Companion Volume Two. Century. ISBN 0712678697.
