= Loin Like a Hunting Flame =

- Millennium episode
- Episode no.: Season 1 Episode 12
- Directed by: David Nutter
- Written by: Ted Man
- Production code: 4C11
- Original air date: January 31, 1997

Guest appearances
- William Lucking as Detective Thomas; Hrothgar Mathews as Art Nesbitt; Harriet Sansom Harris as Maureen Murphy; Barbara Howard as Karen Nesbitt; Malcolm Stewart as Vic; Tyler Labine as Gavin

Episode chronology
← Previous "Weeds"	Next → "Force Majeure"
- Millennium season 1

"'Loin Like a Hunting Flame" is the twelfth episode of the first season of the American crime-thriller television series Millennium. It premiered on the Fox network on January 31, 1997. The episode was written by Ted Mann, and directed by David Nutter. "Loin Like a Hunting Flame" featured guest appearances by William Lucking, Hrothgar Mathews and Harriet Sansom Harris.

Forensic profiler Frank Black (Lance Henriksen), a member of the private investigative organisation Millennium Group, joins a fellow Group member to track a killer driven by sexual neuroses and who uses mood-altering drugs to gain control of his victims.

"Loin Like a Hunting Flame" has received mostly negative reviews from critics, with its treatment of female characters being seen as particularly poor. The episode—Nutter's last contribution to the series—contains several literary references, alluding to both Dylan Thomas and Johann Wolfgang von Goethe.

== Plot ==
In Boulder, Colorado, a rave is underway in a nightclub. Pharmacist Art Nesbitt (Hrothgar Mathews) approaches a young couple, offering them drugs. Later, the three of them share a room elsewhere, with Nesbitt recording the couple having sex. When they finish, he poisons them by injection. Their naked bodies are found the following day in a botanical garden, posed to resemble the story of Adam and Eve. The Millennium Group dispatches profilers Frank Black (Lance Henriksen) and Maureen Murphy (Harriet Sansom Harris) to aid the investigation. Detective Thomas (William Lucking) feels uncomfortable working with Murphy, believing that women do not understand male sex offenders.

Elsewhere, Nesbitt is spying on a swingers' party and follows two women as they leave to buy more alcohol. He impersonates a police officer and pulls their car over. The next day the women are reported missing by their husbands, and their bodies are found posed in a park. Nesbitt is next seen working in his pharmacy, where another young couple come in to purchase medication in preparation for an exotic honeymoon. Nesbitt instead surreptitiously gives them an MDMA-like drug, suggesting they take it immediately.

Meanwhile, the investigation has found traces of the drug in the other victims, with Black believing that the killer not only has access to it through his occupation but is likely consuming it himself while committing his crimes in order to readily act on his sexual fantasies. Black follows up on this by investigating Nesbitt's pharmacy. Nesbitt is not working at the time, but Black realizes he must be the killer. He interviews Nesbitt's wife (Barbara Howard), finding that they have not had sex in eighteen years of marriage—however, Nesbitt has recently become interested in trying again.

Later, Detective Thomas tells Black that he really has no problem with Murphy—his true issue with the case is his own past, as his prior investigations of sex offenses left him unable to be intimate with his wife and lead to their divorce. Black realizes that Nesbitt is trying to experience the sexual encounters he missed out on before his marriage, and that he believes his victims are living the happiest moments of their lives because of his actions. He returns to the Nesbitt residence, finding the honeymooning couple locked in a bomb shelter below the house. Black runs upstairs, stopping Nesbitt from murdering his wife. Cornered and seemingly unwilling to go to jail for his crimes, Nesbitt commits suicide by injecting himself with the drug. As he dies, he tells his wife that he will wait for her.

== Production ==
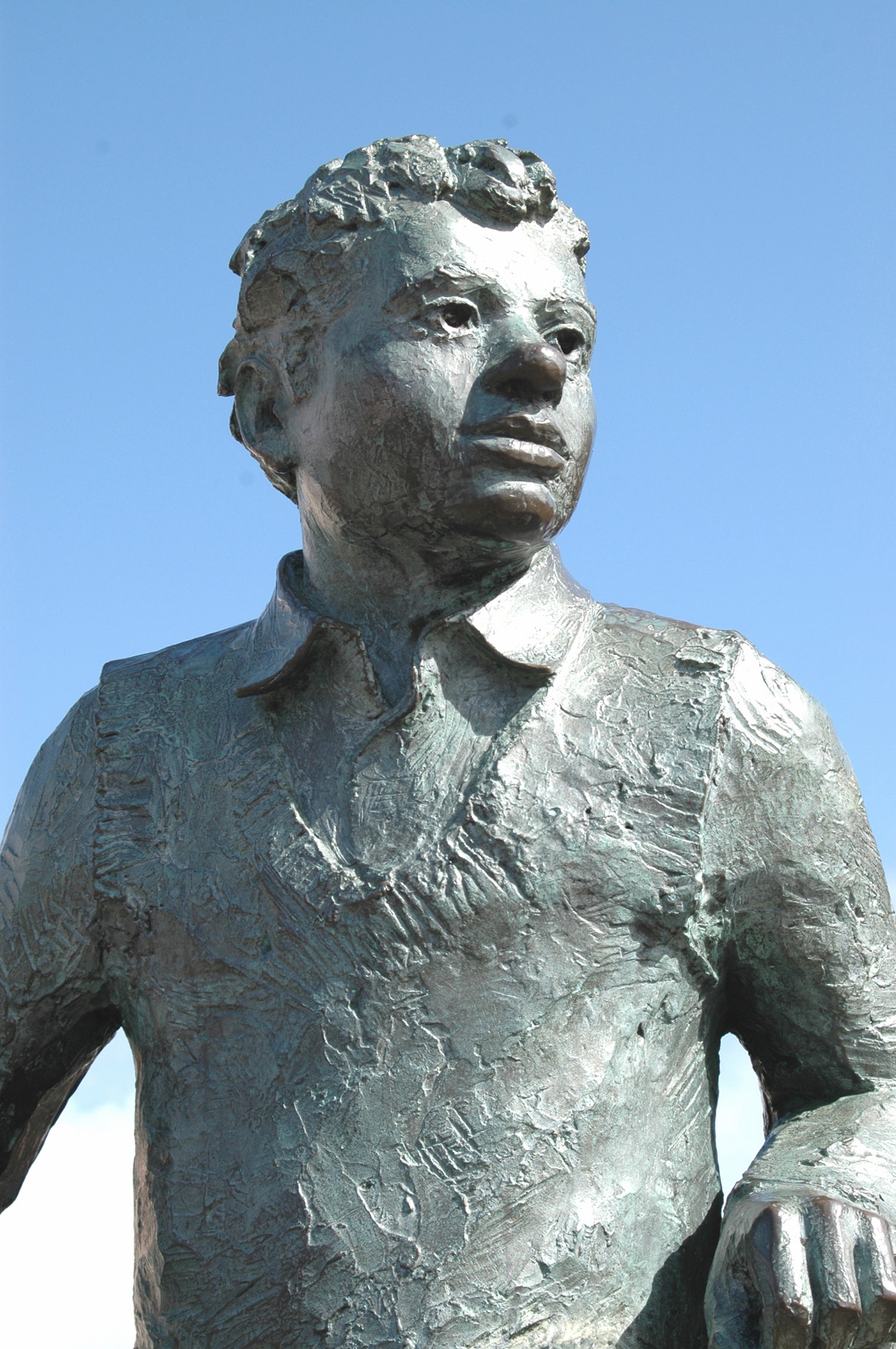
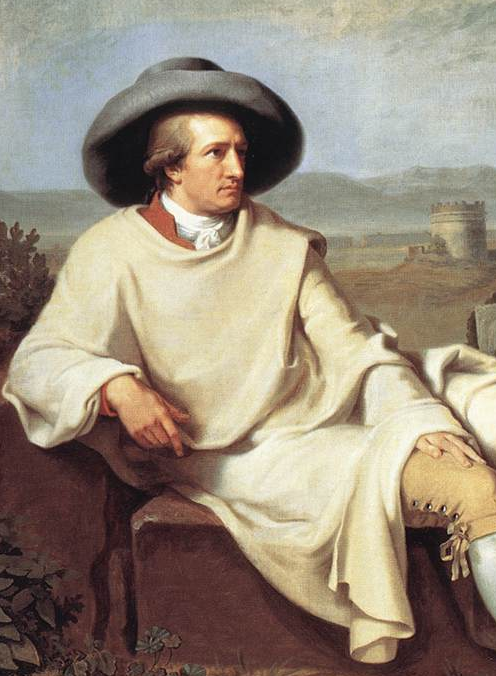
The episode contains allusions to Dylan Thomas (left) and Johann Wolfgang von Goethe (right).

"Loin Like a Hunting Flame" is the second of four episodes of Millennium to have been written by Ted Mann, who had previously written "The Judge", and would go on to write "Powers, Principalities, Thrones and Dominions" and the first-season finale "Paper Dove". The episode was directed by David Nutter, and was his last directing credit for the series, having helmed "Pilot", "Gehenna" and "522666" earlier in the season.

A member of Fox's Standards and Practices department was flown out to the episode's Vancouver, British Columbia filming location. She was asked to watch the episode being produced to ensure that it did not breach any of the network's censorship rules. Several of the scenes that were being produced required quite small spaces during filming, requiring Nutter to record additional coverage on a handheld camera, which he later played back to the Standards and Practices liaison for approval.

The episode's title is taken from a line in the Dylan Thomas poem Ballad of the Long-legged Bait, which was first published in 1946's Deaths and Entrances; while the quotation displayed at the beginning—"Two souls, alas, are housed within my breast"—is taken from Goethe's Faust, a two-part 19th century play by Johann Wolfgang von Goethe. Both literary allusions serve to highlight the secret life of the character of Nesbitt—the first in its subject matter, the second thematically echoing the character's two lives. Several of the cast had previously worked with series creator Chris Carter on his previous series The X-Files—Harriet Sansom Harris had appeared in the first season episode "Eve"; Hrothgar Matthews had played roles in four episodes; and Tyler Labine, who briefly appeared handing out leaflets in the episode's cold open, had made appearances in two episodes of that series.

== Broadcast and reception ==
The episode wants to be both titillating and scolding; it wants us to both sympathize with women and view them as objects of evil sexual immorality. It's all but filled up with a sense of women as the original temptresses, a sense that went out of style with the medieval texts the show sometimes seems directly ripped from.

—The A.V. Club's Emily VanDerWerff on female characters in "Loin Like a Hunting Flame" and Millennium as a whole.

"Loin Like a Hunting Flame" was first broadcast in North America on the Fox Network on January 31, 1997; and earned a Nielsen rating of 8, meaning that roughly 8 percent of all television-equipped households were tuned in to the episode. In Australia, the episode premiered on the Seven Network on July 7, 1997.

"Loin Like a Hunting Flame" received mostly negative reviews from critics. Robert Shearman and Lars Pearson, in their book Wanting to Believe: A Critical Guide to The X-Files, Millennium & The Lone Gunmen, rated the episode two-and-a-half stars out of five, finding Mann's writing to lack tension and imagination. Shearman and Pearson felt that the episode "has good moments, and is at least efficient and watchable", but believed that it "doesn't really deliver anything special, doesn't try to be anything other than average". Bill Gibron, writing for DVD Talk, rated "Loin Like a Hunting Flame" 4 out of 5, describing it as being "handled in a subtle, somber manner". Gibron felt that "the events unfold in this episode evenly and eerily", and it serves as an example of "what could have been done had the show's focus, both literally and metaphysically, remained on crime". Emily VanDerWerff, writing for The A.V. Club, rated the episode an F, calling it "quite possibly one of the worst episodes of television I've ever seen". VanDerWerff felt that the episode's wariness of the 1990s rave subculture was particularly dated. She also felt that "Loin Like a Hunting Flame" served as a prominent example of Millennium's "social conservatism", noting that it seems "fairly closed-off from other points-of-view" than that of the character Frank Black.

== Footnotes ==
=== References ===
- Genge, N. E. (1997). Millennium: The Unofficial Companion. Century. ISBN 0-7126-7833-6.
- Shearman, Robert; Pearson, Lars (2009). Wanting to Believe: A Critical Guide to The X-Files, Millennium & The Lone Gunmen. Mad Norwegian Press. ISBN 978-0-9759446-9-1.
