= Paper Dove =

- Millennium episode
- Episode no.: Season 1 Episode 22
- Directed by: Thomas J. Wright
- Written by: Ted Mann; Walon Green
- Production code: 4C21
- Original air date: May 16, 1997

Guest appearances
- Barbara Williams as Dawn; Mike Starr as Henry Dion; Linda Sorenson as Marie France Dion; Ken Pogue as Tom Miller; William Nunn as C.R. Hunziger; Maxine Miller as Justine Miller; Frank Cassini as Agent Devlin; Judy Norton as Carol Scammel; Paul Raskin as The Figure

Episode chronology
← Previous "Maranatha"	Next → "The Beginning and the End"
- Millennium season 1

"'Paper Dove" is the twenty-second and final episode of the first season of the American crime-thriller television series Millennium. It premiered on the Fox network on May 16, 1997. The episode was written by Ted Mann and Walon Green, and directed by Thomas J. Wright. "Paper Dove" featured guest appearances by Barbara Williams and Mike Starr.

Millennium Group consultant Frank Black (Lance Henriksen) takes his family for holiday in Virginia, not realizing that he has been followed by an old stalker who is manipulating a local serial killer to lure Black into action. "Paper Dove" is a two-part episode, with the story continuing in the second season opening episode "The Beginning and the End".

"Paper Dove" features the first appearances of Maxine Miller and Ken Pogue, who would become minor recurring guests in the series' third season; it also marks the first on-screen appearance of the "Polaroid Man", credited as "The Figure", who had been an unseen presence since "Pilot". The episode's central antagonist is based on a composite of several real life murderers, including Edmund Kemper and Jeffrey Dahmer.

== Plot ==
Millennium Group consultant Frank Black (Lance Henriksen) travels with his wife Catherine (Megan Gallagher) and daughter Jordan (Brittany Tiplady) to visit Catherine's parents in Arlington County, Virginia. Also present are Catherine's sister Dawn (Barbara Williams) and her husband Gil.

In Maryland, Henry Dion (Mike Starr) follows a woman home and murders her; he is later visited by a strange man hiding his face behind dark glasses—it becomes apparent that this is the man who has been sending Black threatening Polaroid pictures. Dion thanks the man (Paul Raskin) for finding the victim for him but is chided for not committing the murder while Black was in the area. Dion takes the corpse into the woods to bury it, speaking to it as though in conversation.

Catherine's father, Tom Miller (Ken Pogue), tells Black about two friends whose son, Malcolm Hunziger, was convicted of killing his wife. Malcolm's father, who is dying of pancreatic cancer, maintains his distance from Malcolm over the crime; his mother, however, still believes her son to be innocent. Black visits Malcolm's father, hoping to change his mind, but the elderly man holds his position. Malcolm's mother gives Black a folder full of documents relating to the case, which Black reviews. His knowledge of offender profiling leads him to believe that Malcolm is innocent; however, the conviction was secured with a substantial level of physical evidence.

Black learns of the murder in Maryland and connects it to the killings of four other women in the area. Ignoring Catherine's protests, Black leaves to investigate the location where one of the earlier bodies was found. A park ranger discusses that case with him, telling Black that the body was found by an unidentified rambler; Black believes this man was the murderer. Elsewhere, Dion returns home, where he is belittled and emasculated by his overbearing mother, Marie (Linda Sorensen).

Black and several former FBI colleagues decide to taunt the killer into coming forward, giving a press release describing him as cowardly. A furious Dion calls the police to rebut this, betraying his identity. Police arrive at Dion's home to arrest him, finding him sitting, covered in blood, on the kitchen floor beside his mother's body. He is apprehended, clearing Malcolm of wrongdoing. Black and his family return home to Seattle. Black carries Jordan from the airport to their car, while Catherine waits to collect their luggage. The man who had helped Dion stands to one side, watching the family. When Black returns to help Catherine with the luggage, he finds she has disappeared, leaving behind only an origami dove given to her by her mother.

== Production ==
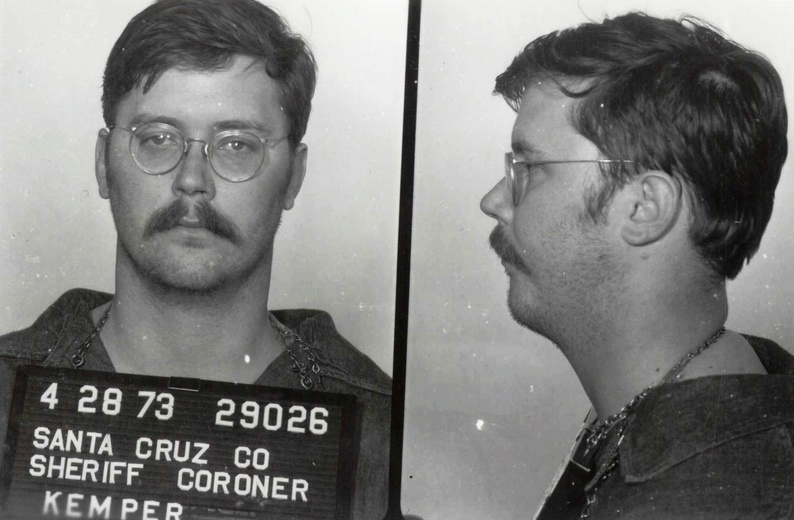
Dion's murder of his mother echoes Edmund Kemper's final murder; both killed their mothers and cut out their vocal cords.

"Paper Dove" was written by Ted Mann and Walon Green, and directed by Thomas J. Wright. Wright had previously directed four episodes of the first season—"Dead Letters", "The Wild and the Innocent", "The Thin White Line" and "Powers, Principalities, Thrones and Dominions"—and would go on to direct a further twenty-one episodes over the series' run. Wright would also go on to direct "Millennium", the series' crossover episode with its sister show The X-Files. "Paper Dove" was Mann's last script for the series, having penned three others earlier in the season; the episode was also the only one to have been written by Green.

The character of Henry Dion appears to be a composite of several real life serial killers. His fondness for conversing with his victims' bodies and the gregarious demeanour shown during this seems to be based on Milwaukee-based murderer Jeffrey Dahmer, who would also, like Dion, document his victims photographically. The habit of photographing victims, and the notion of killing women to use them as props, stems from killer Henri Nadeau, who murdered several women in order to use them as mannequins for his photography. The use of an overbearing matriarchal figure as a stressor harkens to Edmund Kemper, who was driven to kill young women by his hatred of his mother, who he eventually murdered before turning himself in; both Dion and Kemper cut their mother's vocal folds from their throats after killing them.

Maxine Miller and Ken Pogue both make their first appearances as Catherine Black's parents Justine and Tom Miller in this episode; the pair would later reprise their respective roles in several episodes of the third season, including "The Innocents", "Exegesis", and "Seven and One". The character played by Paul Raskin, credited here as "The Figure", would return in the second season opening episode "The Beginning and the End", which continues the storyline from "Paper Dove", although the character would by then be credited as "Polaroid Man", played instead by Doug Hutchison. The character had been a presence in the series since "Pilot", but had previously only been alluded to without being seen.

== Broadcast and reception ==
"Carter was always obviously inspired by the works of David Lynch and Twin Peaks, in particular, and this episode feels like the most pure homage yet, particularly in the moments where Dion and his mother share screentime".

— Emily VanDerWerff on the episode's Lynchian themes

"Paper Dove" was first broadcast on the Fox Network on May 16, 1997. The episode earned a Nielsen rating of 6.6 during its original broadcast, meaning that 6.6 percent of households in the United States viewed the episode. This represented approximately 6.4 million households, and left the episode the sixty-third most-viewed broadcast that week. (Note: Each ratings point represented 970,000 households during the 1996–1997 television season.)

The episode received mostly positive reviews from critics. The A.V. Club's Emily VanDerWerff rated the episode a B+, calling it "a damned odd episode to end a season on, if still an effective one". VanDerWerff felt that "Paper Dove" represented "the deepest the show has pulled us into a killer's subconscious", making it "one of the most bone-chilling episodes Millennium has come up with so far". VanDerWerff compared elements of the episode, most notably the relationship between the character of Henry Dion and his mother, to the works of filmmaker David Lynch, particularly his television series Twin Peaks. Bill Gibron, writing for DVD Talk, rated the episode 4.5 out of 5, noting that it "caps off the series sensationally". Gibron also praised Starr's guest role, describing it as "a stellar interpretation". Robert Shearman and Lars Pearson, in their book Wanting to Believe: A Critical Guide to The X-Files, Millennium & The Lone Gunmen, rated "Paper Dove" four stars out of five. Shearman felt that the series found a comfortable "tonal nuance" in the episode that worked for it, but felt that by the end of the first season none of the supporting cast had been developed well enough to play against Henriksen's Frank Black, noting "there are half a dozen actors who could be termed regulars ... but without exception they remain functional ciphers".

== Footnotes ==
=== References ===
- Douglas, John E.; Olshaker, Mark (1995). Mindhunter: Inside the FBI's Elite Serial Crime Unit. Scribner. ISBN 0-671-52890-4.
- Genge, N. E. (1997). Millennium: The Unofficial Companion Volume Two. Century. ISBN 0712678697.
- Pizzato, Mark (2010). Inner Theatres of Good and Evil: The Mind's Staging of Gods, Angels and Devils. McFarland. ISBN 978-0-7864-4260-7.
- Shearman, Robert; Pearson, Lars (2009). Wanting to Believe: A Critical Guide to The X-Files, Millennium & The Lone Gunmen. Mad Norwegian Press. ISBN 978-0975944691.
