= 522666 =

- Millennium episode
- Episode no.: Season 1 Episode 5
- Directed by: David Nutter
- Written by: Glen Morgan; James Wong
- Production code: 4C05
- Original air date: November 22, 1996

Guest appearances
- Brittany Tiplady as Jordan Black; Sam Anderson as Agent Jack Pierson; Robert Lewis as Agent Sullivan; Joe Chrest as Raymond Dees; Hiro Kanagawa as Agent Takahashi; William MacDonald as Agent Nolan; Roger Barnes as Agent Smith; Deryl Hayes as Officer Mark Stanton

Episode chronology
← Previous "The Judge"	Next → "Kingdom Come"
- Millennium season 1

"'522666" is the fifth episode of the first season of the American crime-thriller television series Millennium. It premiered on the Fox network on November 22, 1996. The episode was written by Glen Morgan and James Wong, and directed by David Nutter. "522666" featured guest appearances by Sam Anderson, Hiro Kanagawa and Joe Chrest.

Millennium Group consultant Frank Black (Lance Henriksen) is approached by the FBI when a series of bombs are detonated in Washington, DC. Black's investigation soon reveals that the culprit seeks to be seen as a hero, setting off explosions in order to rescue people from the scenes; leaving Black to track down the fame-hungry bomber before more people are killed.

"522666" was one of many collaborations between Nutter, Morgan and Wong, with the three having worked together on several television series previously. The episode opens with a reference to existentialist philosopher Jean-Paul Sartre, and featured Henriksen performing all of his own stunts.

== Plot ==
Outside a bar in Washington, D.C., Raymond Dees (Joe Chrest) calls 9-1-1 on a payphone. He says nothing, simply typing the numbers 522666 on the phone's keypad. Later, he watches the bar from a parking garage nearby, masturbating as the bomb he has left inside detonates.

Frank Black (Lance Henriksen) watches the aftermath of the explosion on the news, knowing that the Millennium Group will ask for his assistance on the case. Dees is among the rescuers seen on the broadcast. Black travels to Washington and meets up with fellow Group member Peter Watts (Terry O'Quinn). The two join the FBI task force investigating the bombing, led by Special Agents Pierson (Sam Anderson) and Takahashi (Hiro Kanagawa). Watts and Black quickly dismiss several false claims of responsibility by terrorist groups. Black listens to the 9-1-1 call left by Dees, deducing that the numbers dialed spell the word kaboom on a telephone keypad.

Black and the FBI investigate the crime scene; Black not only realizes the bomber's proficiency with explosives but is able to work out that he viewed the bombing from the parking garage. In a bin in the garage, they find a tissue covered in Dees' semen. Black informs the FBI that the bomber is smart enough to be able to tap into their phone calls, and volunteers to bait him into eavesdropping on his mobile phone. Black's deduction is correct, and as he attempts to stall Dees on the phone while the FBI trace the call, he realizes from Dees' language that the bomber is seeking to become famous through his actions. Dees informs the FBI that he has planned another bombing for the next morning.

The task force rushes to locate the bomb, tracing the call to a small section of the city where it might be located. Scanning the area, Black notices another parking garage opposite an office block and attempts to have the building evacuated. However, Dees has planted a second bomb which detonates fifteen minutes early while Black is inside the building. However, he is pulled to safety by a stranger, who is interviewed on the news following the explosion—Raymond Dees.

Black comes to in a hospital bed, tended to by his wife Catherine (Megan Gallagher). She explains to him what has happened and turns on the evening news to show him the interview with his rescuer. However, watching Dees speak, Black quickly realizes he is the bomber. The FBI locate Dees' home, but he is alerted by his electronic surveillance and escapes before they arrive. However, as Black sits in his car, he receives a call from Dees, who has booby-trapped the vehicle. The FBI are able to monitor this call with Dees' equipment. Dees tells Black that they will both soon be famous, letting Black know that he has a remote detonator for the car's explosives. Before he can use it, however, Dees is killed by a police marksman.

When Black's car is searched, it is clear it was never rigged with anything—Dees had planned the whole thing, knowing that he would be killed. As news reports spread concerning the bomber's identity and his death at the hands of the police, Black sees that Dees has achieved the fame he longed for.

== Production ==
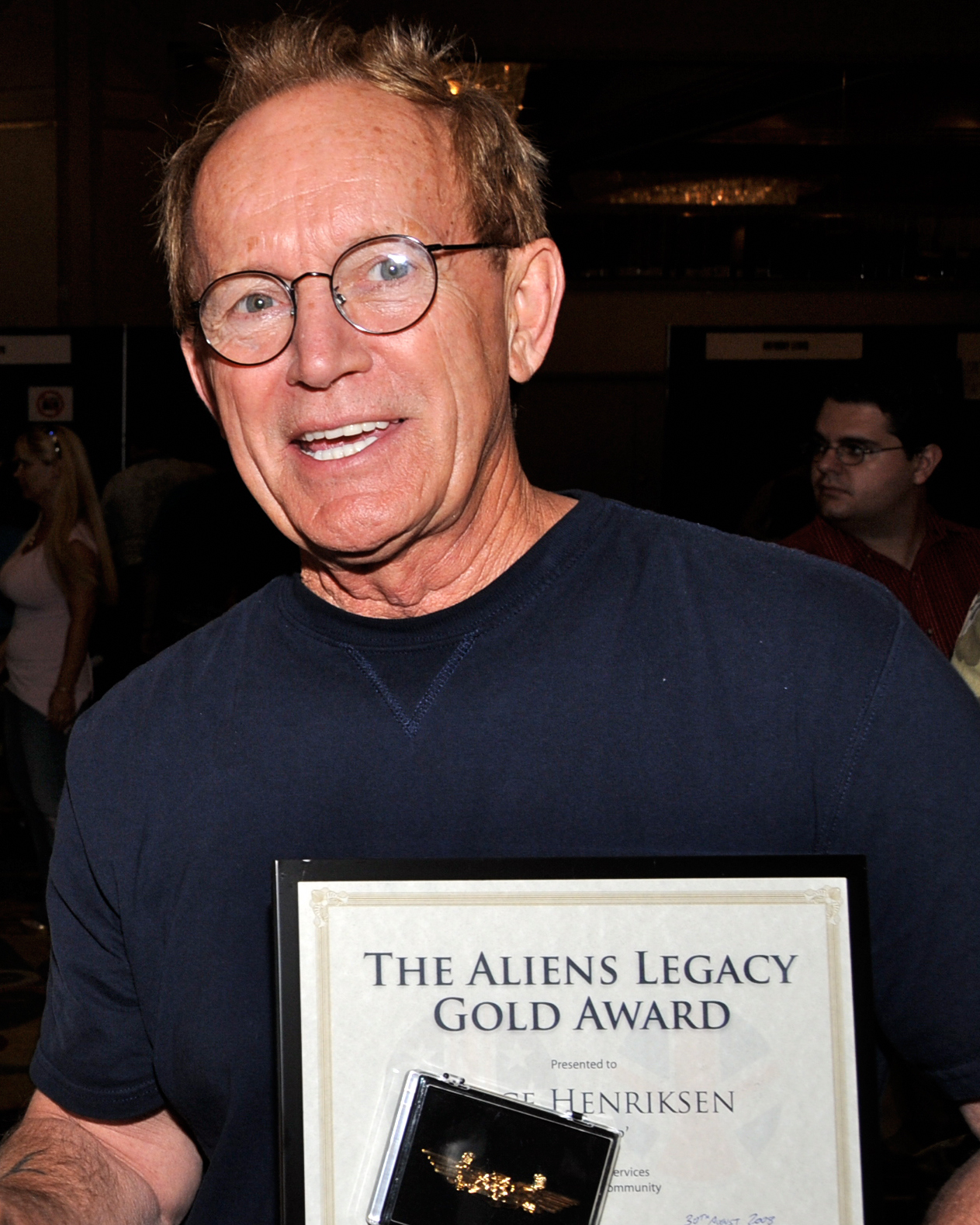
Henriksen performed his own stunts in "522666".

"522666" was directed by David Nutter, who had directed both "Pilot" and "Gehenna" previously, and would also direct "Loin Like a Hunting Flame" later in the season. Writers James Wong and Glen Morgan had previously written "Dead Letters", and would go on to write an additional thirteen episodes during the first and second seasons of the series. Nutter, Morgan and Wong had all previously collaborated on both Millennium's sister show The X-Files, and the Morgan and Wong-created series Space: Above and Beyond.

Guest star Hiro Kanagawa, who portrays FBI special agent Takahashi, has appeared several times in Millennium's sister show The X-Files, in the second and fourth seasons; as well as in The X-Files' spin-off series The Lone Gunmen. Kanagawa would also make several more appearances on Millennium, acting in unrelated roles in the episodes "The Time Is Now", "Human Essence", and "Bardo Thodol". The episode also featured a guest appearance by William MacDonald as FBI Agent Nolan; MacDonald would later reappear in the third season episode "Through a Glass Darkly".

Lance Henriksen performed all his own stunts in this episode, having been introduced to acting by a stuntman friend of his. The episode opens with a quote from French existentialist philosopher and writer Jean-Paul Sartre—"I am responsible for everything... except my very responsibility", which was taken from the 1943 treatise Being and Nothingness. Sarte's writing echoes the motivations of the character of Raymond Dees, with author N. E. Genge noting that both believed that "just because the individual was incapable of changing destiny alone was no reason for him to stop trying".

== Broadcast and reception ==
"522666" was first broadcast on the Fox Network on November 22, 1996, and earned a Nielsen rating of 7.6, meaning that roughly 7.6 percent of all television-equipped households were tuned in to the episode.

The episode received mixed to positive reviews from critics. The A.V. Club's Zack Handlen rated the episode a B−, finding that the episode's 'cat and mouse' chase between Black and Dees was "well constructed" and "exciting", and drawing comparisons between the episode and the film Seven. However, he felt that the ending was poor, and that Megan Gallagher's portrayal of Catherine Black let the episode down. Bill Gibron, writing for DVD Talk, rated the episode 3 out of 5, finding that the focus on technological investigative techniques was "decidedly dull", and that although the episode's premise was initially "interesting", it grew "derivative after a while". Robert Shearman and Lars Pearson, in their book Wanting to Believe: A Critical Guide to The X-Files, Millennium & The Lone Gunmen, note that the episode's premise is the first in the series "to play it entirely straight", avoiding Black's paranormal abilities. Shearman and Pearson rated the episode four-and-a-half stars out of five, describing it as not only "a chilling study of one man's madness, but an indictment upon the modern obsession with celebrity". This interpretation has also been echoed by Mark Pizzato, in his work Inner Theatres of Good and Evil. Pizzato claims that the episode "reflects the media's melodramatic fetishizing of villains and heroes, showing the bomber not only as a vulgar onanist, but also as Frank's savior and a martyr to the mass audience".

== Footnotes ==
=== References ===
- Edwards, Ted (1996). X-Files Confidential. Little, Brown and Company. ISBN 0-316-21808-1.
- Genge, N. E. (1997). Millennium: The Unofficial Companion. Century. ISBN 0-7126-7833-6.
- Pizzato, Mark (2010). Inner Theatres of Good and Evil: The Mind's Staging of Gods, Angels and Devils. McFarland. ISBN 978-0-7864-4260-7.
- Shearman, Robert; Pearson, Lars (2009). Wanting to Believe: A Critical Guide to The X-Files, Millennium & The Lone Gunmen. Mad Norwegian Press. ISBN 978-0-9759446-9-1.
