= Gehenna (Millennium) =

- Millennium episode
- Episode no.: Season 1 Episode 2
- Directed by: David Nutter
- Written by: Chris Carter
- Production code: 4C01
- Original air date: November 1, 1996

Guest appearances
- Robin Gammell as Mike Atkins; Chris Ellis as Jim Penseyres; Sam Khouth as Dylan; Don MacKay as Jack Meredith; George Josef as Mr. Bolow; Stephen Holmes as Eedo

Episode chronology
← Previous "Pilot"	Next → "Dead Letters"
- Millennium season 1

"'Gehenna" is the second episode of the first season of the American crime-thriller television series Millennium. It premiered on the Fox network on November 1, 1996. The episode was written by series creator Chris Carter, and directed by David Nutter. "Gehenna" featured guest appearances by Robin Gammell and Chris Ellis.

Offender profiler Frank Black (Lance Henriksen), a member of the private investigative organisation Millennium Group, is sent to San Francisco to track down a doomsday cult which murders its brainwashed members when they disobey it.

"Gehenna" sees both Carter and Nutter continue their roles from "Pilot", although it also necessitated changes in filming locations. The episode opens with a quote from W. H. Auden's poem "Blessed Event"—the first of the series' opening quotations—and makes references to the Hebrew Bible's Gehenna.

== Plot ==
In San Francisco, a group of young men drive to an abandoned factory and drug one of their number with LSD, leaving him to be torn apart by what he perceives to be a monster. Later, a large quantity of suspicious ash found in a nearby park is proven to be from human remains. The Millennium Group dispatches profiler Frank Black (Lance Henriksen) and colleague Peter Watts (Terry O'Quinn) to investigate the multiple homicide that led to this. Black believes that the victims were burnt alive. Chemical analysis of the ash leads the Group to the factory.

In Black's home in Seattle, Catherine (Megan Gallagher) confides in Lieutenant Bob Bletcher (Bill Smitrovich) her worry about Black's overprotective nature, fearing he may quit his job if he believes his family to be in danger. Catherine does not yet know that the stalker whose actions triggered Black's exit from the FBI has resurfaced and mailed Polaroids of the family to Black. Meanwhile, Black is persuaded by a fellow Group member, Mike Atkins (Robin Gammell), that his family is in no immediate risk.

Back in San Francisco, dental records matched to teeth found in the ashes lead to a young immigrant who vanished six months prior, having joined a doomsday cult. Elsewhere, this cult is seen operating as telemarketers, working in a large assembly hall as propaganda slogans are projected onto the walls around them. One of the members is apprehended by Black. During the subsequent interrogation it becomes clear that the cult, fronting as Gehenna Industries, is brainwashing its members and incinerating those who disobey.

Black returns to Seattle, researching Gehenna Industries from his home. He uncovers a warehouse address belonging to the cult, which Atkins investigates. The warehouse is full of cached weaponry, stockpiled for the cult's doomsday predictions. The cult's leader lures Atkins into the industrial microwave which has been used to immolate the victims, but the police arrive in time to save him, having been tipped off by Black that Atkins may be in danger. The weapons stockpile allows the police to bring down the cult, but Black is certain that their influence is still a threat.

== Production ==
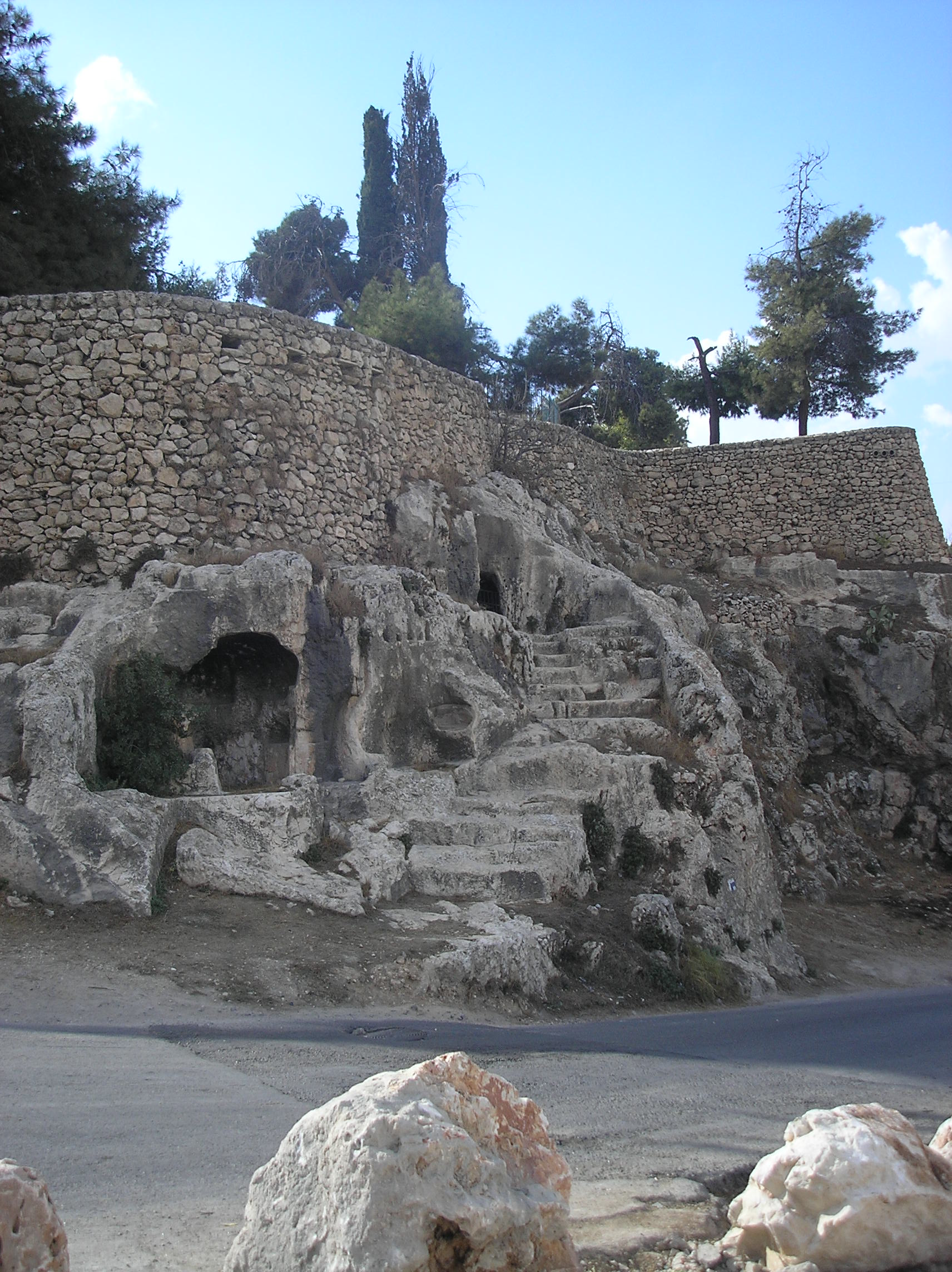
The Valley of Hinnom, the source of the episode's title

"Gehenna" is the second episode of the series directed by David Nutter, who had previously helmed "Pilot". Nutter would also direct "522666" and "Loin Like a Hunting Flame" later in the first season. The episode was written by series creator Chris Carter. Beyond creating the concept for Millennium, Carter would write a total of six other episodes for the series in addition to "Gehenna"—three in the first season, and a further three in the third season. "Gehenna" marked the first appearance by Chris Ellis as Group member Jim Penseyres; Ellis would go on to reprise the role in "Dead Letters" and "The Judge".

The episode opens with a quote from the Anglo-American poet W. H. Auden, taken from the 1939 poem "Blessed Event"—"I smell blood and an era of prominent madmen", the final line of the poem's third stanza. Poetry by William Butler Yeats, a contemporary of Auden's, formed a plot point in "Pilot", while the title of "Loin Like a Hunting Flame" was taken from the work of yet another contemporary, Dylan Thomas. As "Pilot" did not open with a quotation, "Gehenna" is the first episode of Millennium to do so. The episode's title, Gehenna, is the Hellenised form of the Hebrew Gehinnom, the "Valley of the Son of Hinnom". Gehinnom was a location referred to in the Hebrew Bible where children were sacrificed by burning to the Canaanite god Moloch; this ritual sacrifice echoes the cremation of the victims in the episode.

The building used for exterior shots of the Black family's home is different from the one seen in "Pilot"; the earlier house was located in an expensive neighbourhood whose residents had decided not to allow filming to continue there. The new location chosen was one which had already been used in Millennium's sister show The X-Files, appearing in that series' second episode "Deep Throat". The house's owner was an air stewardess who would frequently meet members of the cast and crew as they travelled in and out of Vancouver.

== Broadcast and reception ==
"Gehenna" was first broadcast on the Fox Network on November 1, 1996; and earned a Nielsen rating of 8.1, meaning that roughly 8.1 percent of all television-equipped households were tuned in to the episode. The episode was watched by approximately 7.9 million households. (Note: Each ratings point represented 970,000 households during the 1996–1997 television season.)

"Gehenna" received mixed reviews from critics. Writing for The A.V. Club, Emily VanDerWerff rated the episode a C+, finding that it was "almost completely crippled by ... self-seriousness". VanDerWerff felt that the episode reflected Millennium seeming simultaneously both "intrinsically of the 1990s" and "ahead of its time", find that its treatment of "the dread and shadowy fear and sense that the world held several cloaked and mysterious evils for well-to-do Americans" was a symptom of 1990s preoccupation with "the end of the world" while foreshadowing the mood of the United States following the September 11 attacks in New York in 2001. As a result, VanDerWerff described the episode, and the series, as being "the first post-Sept. 11 show". Bill Gibron, writing for DVD Talk, rated the episode 4.5 out of 5, noting that there is "more here than just your standard serial killer show". Gibron praised the episode's "atypical storyline", which he felt was achieved through "some suggestive effects and wonderful crosscutting". Robert Shearman and Lars Pearson, in their book Wanting to Believe: A Critical Guide to The X-Files, Millennium & The Lone Gunmen, rated the episode two-and-a-half stars out of five, calling it "a somewhat humdrum story". Shearman and Pearson felt that the episode's core premise—that of "a telemarking company being a front for a terrorist cult"—was intriguing, but that the "millennial flavour" that accompanies this resulted in the episode seeming "a little confused".

== Footnotes ==
=== References ===
- Genge, N. E. (1997). Millennium: The Unofficial Companion. Century. ISBN 0712678336.
- Meisler, Andy (1998). I Want to Believe: The Official Guide to the X-Files Volume 3. Harper Prism. ISBN 0061053864.
- Shearman, Robert; Pearson, Lars (2009). Wanting to Believe: A Critical Guide to The X-Files, Millennium & The Lone Gunmen. Mad Norwegian Press. ISBN 978-0975944691.
