= Barbara Howard (actress) =

American retired actress and psychotherapist

- Born: Chicago, Illinois, U.S.
- Education: University of Utah (BFA)
- Occupations: Actress, psychotherapist
- Years active: 1980–2000

Barbara Howard is an American psychotherapist and retired actress, who remains best known for her roles in the film Friday the 13th: The Final Chapter and in the television series Falcon Crest as Melissa Agretti (Ana Alicia)'s cousin Robin Agretti. She retired from acting in 2000 to pursue her current career in psychotherapy.

== Early life ==
Barbara Howard was born in Chicago, Illinois and grew up in Palatine, Illinois. She graduated from William Fremd High School in 1974, and later graduated from the University of Utah with a Bachelor of Fine Arts degree before going to England to study acting at Richmond, The American International University in London.

== Career ==
Howard began her career in Chicago area theater before moving to Los Angeles in April 1983 to pursue a career in acting there. She made her film debut in Racing with the Moon before landing a more significant role in Friday the 13th: The Final Chapter. In 1985, she landed the role of Robin Agretti on Falcon Crest but opted to leave the following year to pursue more film roles and Broadway roles in New York.

== Filmography ==
=== Film ===
Year	Title	Role	Notes
1984	Racing with the Moon	Gatsby Girl	
1984	Friday the 13th: The Final Chapter	Sara Parkington	
1985	Running Mates	Elizabeth Adams	
1988	Lucky Stiff	Frances	
1990	White Palace	Sherri Klugman	
1993	Amityville: A New Generation	Janet Cutler	
1998	Slappy and the Stinkers	Sonny's Mom	
1998	Music from Another Room	Denise	
1998	Where's Marlowe?	Emma Huffington	
2009	His Name Was Jason: 30 Years of Friday The 13th	Herself	Documentary

=== Television ===
Year	Title	Role	Notes
1983	Silver Spoons	Valerie	Episode: "Passports to Pleasure"
1983	For Love and Honor	Ronnie Prendergant	Episode: "N.O.K. Hagedorn"
1984	Airwolf	Holly Mathews	Episode: "The Truth About Holly"
1985–1986	Falcon Crest	Robin Agretti	27 episodes
1988	CBS Summer Playhouse	Ginger	Episode: "Tickets, Please"
1989	Paradise	Marian	Episode: "Squaring Off"
1989	Fair Game	Leslie Blumenkrantz	Television film
1992	Those Secrets	Beth	Television film
1993	In the Heat of the Night	Connie Meacham	Episode: "A Dish Best Served Cold"
1993	Picket Fences	Lori Jude	Episode: "The Lullaby League"
1994	Out of Darkness	Triage Officer	Television film
1995	Fallen Angels	Janice / Nurse	2 episodes
1995	The Nanny	Fertility Doctor	Episode: "Having His Baby"
1997	Millennium	Karen Nesbitt	Episode: "Loin Like a Hunting Flame"
1997–2000	Early Edition	Sandra Comess / Linda Chevalier	2 episodes
