= Dead Letters (Millennium) =

- Millennium episode
- A single human hair inscribed with the message "hair today".
- Episode no.: Season 1 Episode 3
- Directed by: Thomas J. Wright
- Written by: Glen Morgan; James Wong
- Production code: 4C02
- Original air date: November 8, 1996

Guest appearances
- Chris Ellis as Jim Penseyres; Ron Halder as The Killer; James Morrison as Jim Horn; Garvin Cross as Patient; Anthony Harrison as Detective Jenkins; Lisa Vultaggio as Janice Sterling

Episode chronology
← Previous "Gehenna"	Next → "The Judge"
- Millennium season 1

"'Dead Letters" is the third episode of the first season of the American crime-thriller television series Millennium. It premiered on the Fox network on November 8, 1996. The episode was written by Glen Morgan and James Wong, and directed by Thomas J. Wright. "Dead Letters" featured guest appearances by Chris Ellis, Ron Halder and James Morrison.

Millennium Group consultant Frank Black (Lance Henriksen) is sent to evaluate a prospective member of the group, who perform private investigative work and liaise with law enforcement. Meeting this hopeful member, Jim Horn (Morrison), Black is drawn to investigate a serial killer operating in the area; while Horn begins to unravel under the strain of the case.

Several of the cast and crew made their first contributions to the series in "Dead Letters", with Wright, Morgan, Wong and Ellis all returning for future episodes. Production of "Dead Letters" impressed other series regulars—series writer Chip Johannessen praised the script's attention to detail, while producer John Peter Kousaskis called positive attention to its physical and make-up effects.

== Plot ==
Frank Black (Lance Henriksen) comforts his daughter Jordan (Brittany Tiplady) when she is awakened by a bad dream. However, Black is soon called to investigate the body of a woman at a dog pound in Portland, Oregon. He is asked by Jim Penseyres (Chris Ellis), a fellow member of the Millennium Group, to help a local detective on the case, as he is being considered as prospective member of the Group. Black believes the murder to be the work of a serial killer and is convinced there will be a message from him on the bodies.

Black meets up with the detective, Jim Horn (James Morrison), and sees that he is a competent and experienced investigator, although his recent marital separation has left him distracted and on edge. Meanwhile, the killer murders another woman and disposes the body in a post office's dead letter office. Investigating, Black finds a human hair with a message etched into it—"hair today, gone tomorrow"—which he takes as an indication that the killer is lashing out at a world that he feels has treated him as insignificant. Horn's mental condition seems to deteriorate, and he begins to take the case personally, leading Black to doubt his ability.

A third victim turns up with another message—"nothing ventured, nothing gained." A lens from the killer's glasses is also recovered. Black organizes a press release in an attempt to draw out the killer, taunting his intelligence by including a falsified profile describing him as uneducated. Black and Horn feel this will lure the killer to the latest victim's memorial service. Horn attacks an innocent man at the service, believing him to be the killer, although a cross found at the memorial with "ventured" etched upon it proves the killer did attend. Surveillance footage of the service yields two leads—a local optician recognizes the suspect as a customer having a glasses lens replaced, and the killer's vehicle is identified.

Black and Horn realize that the killer will have chosen the optician as his next victim and agree to set another trap with her as the bait. An increasingly unhinged Horn begins imagining the killer and his van at every turn. As he and Black wait for the killer, Horn admits that he cannot trust himself to be there and is told to go home. However, he parks his car on the route towards the trap, feigning a flat tire. When the killer's van attempts to pass, Horn attacks him, but police arrive in time to stop him beating the killer to death. The attack renders any evidence found in the van inadmissible in court, although Black tells him enough evidence was found at the killer's house to secure a conviction. Later, Horn asks Black how he can deal with cases like this on a regular basis. Black does not answer, but later comforts his daughter after another bad dream.

== Production ==
"Dead Letters" is the first episode of Millennium to be written by James Wong and Glen Morgan, who would go on to write another fourteen episodes across the first and second seasons. The episode is also the first not to have been written by series creator Chris Carter, who had penned both of the preceding episodes, "Pilot" and "Gehenna". "Dead Letters" also marked the first time Thomas J. Wright had directed an episode of the series. Wright would go on to direct twenty-six episodes across all three seasons, as well as directing "Millennium", the series' crossover episode with its sister show The X-Files. He had also previously worked with Morgan and Wong on their series Space: Above and Beyond.

The episode marked the second of three appearances by Chris Ellis as Millennium Group member Jim Penseyres; Ellis had previously appeared in "Gehenna", and would reappear in the next episode, "The Judge". Guest star James Morrison, who portrayed the troubled Jim Horn, had also previously appeared as a main character in Morgan and Wong's Space: Above and Beyond, playing Tyrus Cassius McQueen; his character's son in this episode is named TC as a reference to this. Lisa Vultaggio, who played the optician used to bait the killer, had previously worked with Morgan and Wong in The X-Files, appearing in the first season episode "Beyond the Sea".

Producer and writer Chip Johannessen felt that the scene in this episode in which a human hair is discovered with a message inscribed upon it was a "perfect" moment, in that it "told you everything about this guy [the killer] ... but you had no idea what he was or what he was going to do next ... you know what kind of crazy motherfucker would do that, but where he is or what he's going to do next, who knows". The episode's opening nightmare sequence, in which Jordan Black (Brittany Tiplady) is terrified by a clown crawling along the ceiling, was inspired by the childhood nightmares of Morgan and Wong, and left Tiplady suffering from bad dreams herself for several nights after filming. Producer John Peter Kousakis recalls having visited the episode's set late during production, having felt that make-up effects supervisor Toby Lindala had been doing "fabulous" work on the series' prosthetic body parts. Walking on set to find Lindala's recreation of a quartered corpse, Kousakis remarked "we're doing something special here, but we're also doing something really outrageous". Lance Henriksen also found this scene too graphic to film all at once, taking time between shots to compose himself.

== Reception ==
"Dead Letters" was first broadcast on the Fox Network on November 8, 1996; and earned a Nielsen rating of 8, meaning that roughly 8 percent of all television-equipped households were tuned in to the episode.

"Dead Letters" earned positive reviews from critics. Writing for The A.V. Club, Zack Handlen rated the episode a B+. Handlen felt that the episode is "not art, not yet, but it is deeply personal", and praised the opening dream sequence, describing it as "flat-out Lynchian nightmare territory". However, he noted that the episode's dialogue felt too "flat" and "expository", adding that it serves to draw "attention to themes that were already plastered across the screen in blinding red and black". Bill Gibron, writing for DVD Talk, rated the episode 4 out of 5, describing it as being "one of the more horrifying episodes in Season 1". Gibron added that "seeing Jim Horn go through his mental breakdown gives us insight into where Frank Black is coming from", although he felt that the lack of real insight into the killer's personality let the episode down. Robert Shearman and Lars Pearson, in their book Wanting to Believe: A Critical Guide to The X-Files, Millennium & The Lone Gunmen, rated the episode four stars out of five, describing it as a "gripping and sincere portrait of human ugliness at its most banal". Shearman and Pearson praised guest star James Morrison's acting, noting that he was "the very humanity that the show is crying out for".

== Footnotes ==
=== References ===
- Genge, N. E. (1997). Millennium: The Unofficial Companion. Century. ISBN 0-7126-7833-6.
- Shearman, Robert; Pearson, Lars (2009). Wanting to Believe: A Critical Guide to The X-Files, Millennium & The Lone Gunmen. Mad Norwegian Press. ISBN 978-0-9759446-9-1.
