= The Well-Worn Lock =

- Millennium episode
- Episode no.: Season 1 Episode 8
- Directed by: Ralph Hemecker
- Written by: Chris Carter
- Production code: 4C07
- Original air date: December 20, 1996

Guest appearances
- Bill Smitrovich as Lt. Bob Bletcher; Paul Dooley as Joe Bangs; Michelle Joyner as Connie Bangs; Christine Dunford as Rhonda Preshutski; Lenore Zann as Ruthie Bangs; Sheila Moore as Clea Bangs; J. Douglas Stewart as Larry Bangs; Shaina Tianne Unger as Sara Bangs

Episode chronology
← Previous "Blood Relatives"	Next → "Wide Open"
- Millennium season 1

"'The Well-Worn Lock" is the eighth episode of the first season of the American crime-thriller television series Millennium. It premiered on the Fox network on December 20, 1996. The episode was written by series creator Chris Carter, and directed by Ralph Hemecker. "The Well-Worn Lock" featured guest appearances by Paul Dooley and Lenore Zann.

Clinical social worker Catherine Black (Megan Gallagher) aids a family as they come to terms with the incestuous abuse they have suffered for decades. However, the father who is responsible still commands respect and political connections in the area, making the case a difficult one.

"The Well-Worn Lock" is the third of seven Millennium episodes written by Carter. Hemecker would return to direct an episode in each of the show's seasons. The episode opens with a quote from Robert Louis Stevenson, and features several actors who would reappear in unrelated roles in both Millennium and its sister series The X-Files.

== Plot ==
In the Madison Park neighborhood of Seattle, a family are gathered around the television. When the mother leaves to go to bed, the atmosphere in the room grows tense. The eldest of two sisters, Connie Bangs (Michelle Joyner) takes her younger sister Sara to her bedroom and locks her in, warning her not to let her father inside. Connie runs out of the house, fighting off her father, and is later found wandering the streets confused. She is taken to clinical social worker Catherine Black (Megan Gallagher) and admits that her father has been sexually abusing her for years.

Given the length of time the abuse has been going on, Connie is afraid that she won't be believed. The assistant district attorney assigned to the case, Rhonda Preshutski (Christine Dunford), believes the case to be weak. Social workers cannot remove Sara from the household until Connie undergoes a psychiatric evaluation, although Catherine and police lieutenant Bob Bletcher (Bill Smitrovich) investigate the Bangs home to check up on the girl. The father, Joe Bangs (Paul Dooley), chases them off as his wife watches detachedly. Bangs wields a degree of political clout in the community and pressures the district attorney's office to drop the case. Preshutski is furious with Catherine over the matter until it is discovered from Connie's medical exams that Sara is not her sister, but her daughter.

Catherine is later woken in her office by her husband Frank (Lance Henriksen); she had fallen asleep there while trying to find a legal precedent for removing Sara from the Bangs home. Catherine visits Connie, who is staying with another sister, Ruthie (Lenore Zann). Ruthie also reveals that their father had abused her until she was committed following mental breakdown. Catherine is worried that Connie might be persuaded by her mother to drop the case.

Joe finds himself unable to have the case dropped, but Bletcher still feels that Catherine's pursuit of the matter may result in the loss of her job. However, Catherine knows she is doing the right thing and is determined to continue. Her fears for Sara are confirmed when it is discovered she and Joe have gone missing. Frank, a criminal profiler, deduces that Joe's controlling personality will cause him to take his daughter somewhere he knows and realizes that the two of them will be at the family's cabin in the woods. A police manhunt begins, and Joe is arrested without Sara coming to harm.

The case against Joe is presented before a grand jury, and Catherine is afraid that Connie will be too afraid to testify. However, Connie manages to reveal the truth of her abuse to the court. Later, she is seen with the lock from her bedroom door—which had previously been used by her father to lock them both inside—which she throws into a river.

== Production ==
"The Well-Worn Lock" was the first of three Millennium episodes directed by Ralph Hemecker. Hemecker would later helm the second season's "The Curse of Frank Black", and the third season episode "Exegesis". The episode was written by series creator Chris Carter. Beyond creating the concept for Millennium, Carter would write a total of six other episodes for the series in addition to "The Well-Worn Lock"—three in the first season, and a further three in the third season.

Several of the actors in this episode have made other appearances in Millennium or series related to it. Michelle Joyner, who played abuse victim Connie Bangs, would later appear on Millennium's sister show The X-Files, starring in the seventh season episode "Chimera". Guest star J. Douglas Stewart, who portrays Larry Bangs, later appeared in the second season episode "Monster" in an unrelated role. Fellow guest Sheila Moore, who played Clea Bangs, had previously made two appearances on The X-Files, in the episodes "Deep Throat" and "Excelsis Dei".

The episode opens with a quotation by Robert Louis Stevenson—"The cruelest lies are often told in silence". The line is taken from Virginibus Puerisque, and Other Papers, an 1881 collection of essays.

== Broadcast and reception ==
"The Well-Worn Lock" was first broadcast on the Fox Network on December 20, 1996, and earned a Nielsen rating of 6.8, meaning that roughly 6.8 percent of all television-equipped households were tuned into the episode.

The episode received mixed reviews from critics. Robert Shearman and Lars Pearson, in their book Wanting to Believe: A Critical Guide to The X-Files, Millennium & The Lone Gunmen, rated the episode two stars out of five, noting that it "turns the complex into something easy and obvious". Shearman and Pearson felt that the character of Sara Bangs was "treated as an object by the episode", and that Carter's script "takes a very real issue and trivialises it" by presenting such an "open and shut case". However, they noted that the episode was "very well acted", and was "clearly well intentioned". The A.V. Club's Emily VanDerWerff rated the episode a B+, noting that it "tries some interesting things with the Millennium template". VanDerWerff felt that several of the episode's scenes "are as horrifying as anything I've seen on TV", adding that "they accomplish much of this through the mere power of suggestion". However, she also noted that the character of Joe Bangs was too simplistic, claiming that he is "so damned blatant about what he does that it eventually stops being horrifying and becomes preposterous". Bill Gibron, writing for DVD Talk, rated the episode 2.5 out of 5, finding that its focus on legal issues and counselling "fragments the tone and atmosphere" built by previous episodes. However, Gibron felt that "Carter's script handles the horrifying subject very well".

== Footnotes ==
=== References ===
- Genge, N. E. (1997). Millennium: The Unofficial Companion. Century. ISBN 0-7126-7833-6.
- Lowry, Brian (1995). The Truth is Out There: The Official Guide to the X-Files. Harper Prism. ISBN 0-06-105330-9.
- Shearman, Robert; Pearson, Lars (2009). Wanting to Believe: A Critical Guide to The X-Files, Millennium & The Lone Gunmen. Mad Norwegian Press. ISBN 978-0-9759446-9-1.
