= Broken World (Millennium) =

- Millennium episode
- Episode no.: Season 1 Episode 20
- Directed by: Winrich Kolbe
- Written by: Robert Moresco; Patrick Harbinson
- Production code: 4C19
- Original air date: May 2, 1997

Guest appearances
- John Dennis Johnston as Sheriff Falkner; Michael Tayles and Deputy Billy; J. B. Bivens as First Deputy; Van Quattro as Willi Borgsen; Ingrid Kavelaars as Sally Dumont; Donnelly Rhodes as Peter Dumont; Jo Anderson as Claudia Vaughan; Tom Bougers as Tom; P. Adrien Dorval as Fatso

Episode chronology
← Previous "Powers, Principalities, Thrones and Dominions"	Next → "Maranatha"
- Millennium season 1

"'Broken World" is the twentieth episode of the first season of the American crime-thriller television series Millennium. It premiered on the Fox network on May 2, 1997. The episode was written by Robert Moresco and Patrick Harbinson, and directed by Winrich Kolbe. "Broken World" featured guest appearances by Ingrid Kavelaars, Donnelly Rhodes and Jo Anderson.

Millennium Group consultant Frank Black (Lance Henriksen) travels to North Dakota to track down a burgeoning serial killer who has progressed from mauling horses to attacking and killing people.

"Broken World" featured the last directorial effort for the series by Kolbe, and the last script written by Moresco; however, Harbinson would return to write further episodes in later seasons. The episode has been compared to Peter Shaffer's 1973 play Equus, and received a Genesis Award from the Humane Society of the United States in 1998.

== Plot ==
In Williston, North Dakota, a stable-hand named Sally Dumont (Ingrid Kavelaars) is attacked and left unconscious after she finds a horse has been killed in its stall. The Millennium Group sends consultant Frank Black (Lance Henriksen) to investigate, as twenty-one horses have been killed in the same manner over the past two years in the area. Black believes the culprit is in the early stages of developing into a sexually motivated serial killer. Investigating the stables, the word "help" is found written in human blood, while semen is found near where the horse was killed. Black concludes the suspect is struggling with the new feelings of having attacked a person and not an animal.

The suspect—Willi Borgsen (Van Quattro)—is next seen attacking pigs in a trailer using a cattle prod. Borgsen is accosted by the pigs' owner and responds by turning the cattle prod on him. The victim's body is later found in a nearby thicket. Black examines the scene, determining from the bootprints and evidence of the cattle prod being used that the killer works in a slaughterhouse.

Another human victim is later found on a farm, alongside another dead horse; the phrase "thank you" is daubed on a nearby wall. The state police set up an anonymous phone number to appeal for information, which Borgsen uses to taunt Black by describing the pleasure he derives from killing. Black consults with a veterinarian, Claudia Vaughan (Jo Anderson), and learns that the area is home to a Premarin farm—estrogen for pharmaceutical use is derived from the urine of mares which are kept pregnant, their foals killed for meat to be exported. Black feels the killer may have been raised on one of these farms.

Borgsen contacts Black again, confessing that his latest killing has not satisfied him. Black warns that his urges will only grow and never be satisfied. When Borgsen hangs up, Black deduces that Vaughan is to be the next victim. Black, fellow Group member Peter Watts (Terry O'Quinn) and Sheriff Falkner (John Dennis Johnston) track the kidnapped Vaughan to an equine slaughterhouse. Falkner is attacked and incapacitated by Borgsen as Black locates a still-living Vaughan, who has been hung by her jacket from a meat hook. Black is then confronted by Borgsen, who knocks him down with the cattle prod. Borgsen is about to kill Black with a captive bolt pistol but is trampled to death by several escaped horses.

== Production ==
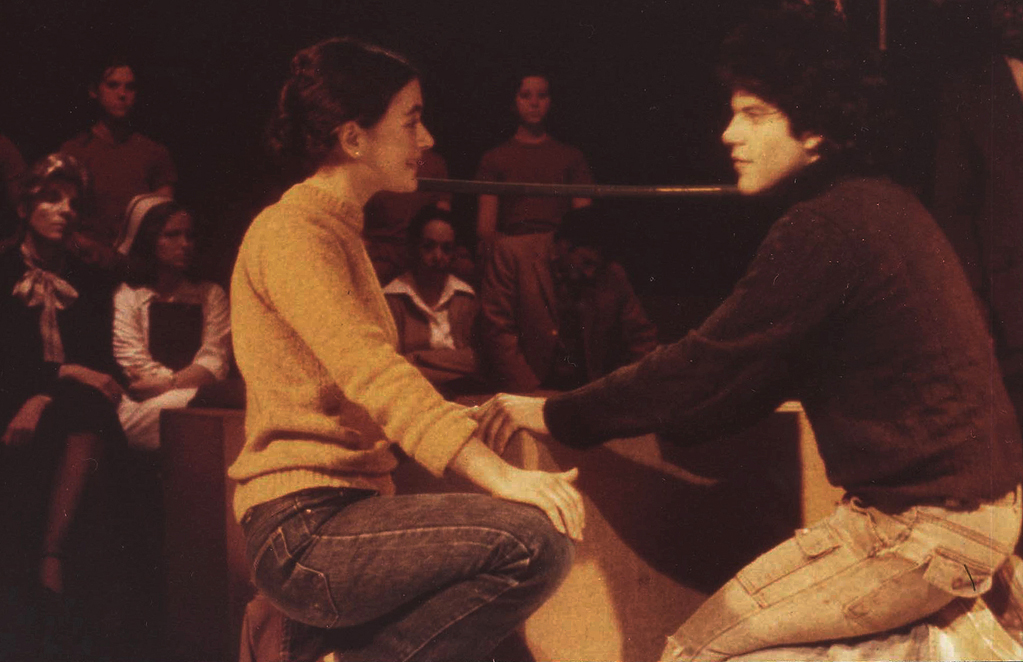
"Broken World" has been compared to the play Equus (1979 production pictured).

"Broken World" was written by Robert Moresco and Patrick Harbinson. Moresco had previously written "Covenant" earlier in the first season, and also acted as a producer during the series' run. Harbinson, making his first contribution to the series with this episode, would later pen a further four episodes in the third season—"Via Dolorosa", "Darwin's Eye", "The Sound of Snow" and "Through a Glass Darkly". "Broken World" also marked the final episode of Millennium helmed by director Winrich Kolbe, who had previously worked on "Lamentation", "Force Majeure" and "Kingdom Come".

During production, "Broken World" was instead set to be titled "Equus", which is Latin for "horse" and was also the title of a 1973 play by Peter Shaffer concerning a young man with violent sexual urges towards horses. The episode opens with a quote from Friedrich Nietzsche's 1883–1885 treatise Thus Spoke Zarathustra—"Man is the cruelest animal". Guest star Donnelly Rhodes, who portrayed Peter Dumont, would later make an appearance in the third season episode "...Thirteen Years Later" in an unrelated role.

== Broadcast and reception ==
"Broken World" was first broadcast on the Fox Network on May 2, 1997. The episode earned a Nielsen rating of 6.8 during its original broadcast, meaning that 6.8 percent of households in the United States viewed the episode. This represented 6.6 million households, and left the episode the sixty-eighth most-viewed broadcast that week. (Note: Each ratings point represented 970,000 households during the 1996–1997 television season.)

The episode received mixed reviews from critics. The A.V. Club's Emily VanDerWerff rated the episode a C, comparing it to the first act of Shaffer's Equus. VanDerWerff described the episode as "a bland, boring mess that ends with one of the most ridiculous deux ex machinas [sic] I’ve seen in ages", and felt that "the guest cast is uniformly poor", singling out Van Quattro as being "laughably bad". Bill Gibron, writing for DVD Talk, rated the episode 3 out of 5, calling it " enthralling" but "not completely successful". Gibron felt that elements of the setting were "very sinister", but found the "overwhelming pro-horse mantras" of some characters to be "silly". Robert Shearman and Lars Pearson, in their book Wanting to Believe: A Critical Guide to The X-Files, Millennium & The Lone Gunmen, rated "Broken World" three stars out of five, finding it "too familiar and too tentative to make much impact". Shearman felt that the episode would have been better placed earlier in the series' broadcast order, but by this stage in the first season it had been "outgrown".

"Broken World" received a Genesis Award in 1998, presented by the Humane Society of the United States in the category "Television Dramatic Series".

== Footnotes ==
=== References ===
- Genge, N. E. (1997). Millennium: The Unofficial Companion Volume Two. Century. ISBN 0712678697.
- Nietzsche, Friedrich Wilhelm (2008). Thus Spake Zarathustra. Wilder Publications. ISBN 978-1604593235.
- Shearman, Robert; Pearson, Lars (2009). Wanting to Believe: A Critical Guide to The X-Files, Millennium & The Lone Gunmen. Mad Norwegian Press. ISBN 978-0975944691.
