= Walon Green =

American filmmaker (born 1936)

- Born: December 15, 1936 (age 89); Baltimore, Maryland
- Occupations: Film and television writer and producer
- Notable work: The Wild Bunch; The Hellstrom Chronicle; NYPD Blue
- Children: Darwin Green, Collin Green

Walon Green (born December 15, 1936) is an American documentary film director and screenwriter, for both television and film.

== Career ==
Green produced and directed documentaries for National Geographic and David Wolper, including The Hellstrom Chronicle, for which he was accorded the Oscar and the BAFTA in 1972, and The Secret Life of Plants in 1979. Among his screenwriting credits are the films The Wild Bunch, Sorcerer, The Brink's Job, Solarbabies, Eraser, The Hi-Lo Country and RoboCop 2. On television, he wrote and produced episodes of Hill Street Blues, Law & Order, ER and NYPD Blue for which he received a 1995 Edgar Award. He was a Creative Consultant for the Chris Carter science fiction TV series Millennium, where he co-wrote the episode "Paper Dove" with Ted Mann. He is also notable for allowing a millipede to crawl over his face in the tunnel scene of Willy Wonka & the Chocolate Factory.

In fall 2008, he assumed the post of executive producer for the Vincent D'Onofrio-Kathryn Erbe episodes of Law & Order: Criminal Intent, he took over as show runner/executive producer for all episodes in the series' ninth season. In 2008, Green was the Head Writer/Showrunner of the television pilot Bunker Hill, starring Donnie Wahlberg and Bridget Moynahan and directed by Jon Avnet. The pilot was not picked up for a series.

Green wrote the 2015 miniseries adaptation of Killing Jesus: A History.

== Awards and nominations ==
Walon Green was nominated in 1970 for an Oscar for best original screenplay for The Wild Bunch. He was awarded an Oscar in 1972 for his pseudo-documentary The Hellstrom Chronicle, for which he also won The Technical Grand Prize at Cannes in 1971 and the Flaherty Documentary Award.

He was nominated for Primetime Emmys in 1986 for Hill Street Blues, in 1993 and 1994 for his work on Law & Order and won an Emmy in 1995 for his writing on NYPD Blue.

Green was nominated for an Emmy Award for co-writing (with Robert Nathan) the 1993 Law & Order episode "Manhood". The episode won a GLAAD Media Award for Outstanding Dramatic Television Episode.

Green was nominated for an Edgar Allan Poe Award in 1993 for an episode of Law & Order and won the same award in 1995 which he shared with David Milch and Steven Bochco for their NYPD Blue episode "Simone Says."

== Personal life ==
Walon Green was born in Baltimore, Maryland on December 15, 1936. He is the father of Darwin Green, a writer and film editor, and Collin Green, a teacher and photographer.

== Filmography ==
As writer - films

- Morituri (1965) (uncredited)
- The Wild Bunch (1969)
- Sorcerer (1977)
- The Brink's Job (1978)
- The Border (1982)
- WarGames (1983) (uncredited)
- Solarbabies (1986)
- Crusoe (1988)
- RoboCop 2 (1990)
- Eraser (1996)
- The Hi-Lo Country (1998)
- Dinosaur (2000) (co-screenplay and co-story)

Television

- Plimpton! Adventures in Africa (1972, TV film)
- Strange New World (1975, TV film)
- Mysteries of the Sea (1980, TV film)
- Robert Kennedy and His Times (1985, TV miniseries episode)
- Hill Street Blues (1985–1986, 11 TV episodes)
- Law & Order (1992–1994, 8 TV episodes)
- Without Warning (1994, TV movie)
- NYPD Blue (1994–1995, 4 TV episodes)
- Millenium (1997, 1 episode)
- ER (1997-2000, 5 episodes)
- Big Apple (2001, 1 episode)
- Zero Effect (2002, TV film)
- Dragnet (2003, 1 episode)
- L.A. Confidential (2003)
- Law & Order: Trial by Jury (2005, 3 episodes)
- Conviction (2006, 13 episodes as writer/developer)
- Bunker Hill (2009, TV film)
- Law & Order: Criminal Intent (2009–2010, 6 episodes)
- Saints & Strangers (2015, 1 episode)
- The Man in the High Castle (2015, 1 episode)
- Killing Jesus (2015, TV film)
- Saints & Strangers (2015, 1 episode, miniseries)
- Mercy Street (2017, 2 episodes)
