= Pilot (Millennium) =

- Millennium episode
- Episode no.: Season 1 Episode 1
- Directed by: David Nutter
- Written by: Chris Carter
- Production code: 4C79
- Original air date: October 25, 1996

Guest appearances
- Bill Smitrovich as Bob Bletcher; Terry O'Quinn as Peter Watts; Paul Dillon as The Frenchman; Brittany Tiplady as Jordan Black; Stephen E. Miller as Roger Kamm; Stephen J. Lang as Bob Geibelhouse; Kate Luyben as Tuesday; April Telek as Calamity; Don MacKay as Jack Meredith; Mike Puttonen as Curt Massey; Jarred Blancard as Young Man at Ruby Tip; Jim Thorburn as Coffin Man; Kimm Wakefield as Young Woman; John Destry as Driver on Bridge; Liza Huget as Nurse; Jim Filippone as Chopper Pilot; Fawnia Mondey as Ruby Tip Stripper

Episode chronology
| ← Previous — | Next → "Gehenna" |
- Millennium season 1

"Pilot" is the pilot episode of the crime-thriller television series Millennium. It premiered on the Fox network on October 25, 1996. The episode was written by series creator Chris Carter, and directed by David Nutter. "Pilot" featured guest appearances by Paul Dillon, April Telek and Stephen J. Lang.

Offender profiler Frank Black (Lance Henriksen), a member of the private investigative organisation Millennium Group, retires to Seattle with his family after a breakdown caused him to quit working for the Federal Bureau of Investigation. Using his incredible profiling skills, Black helps in an effort to catch a vicious murderer who believes he is fulfilling apocalyptic prophecies.

"Pilot" was filmed over the course of a month in Vancouver, British Columbia, and was inspired by the writings of Nostradamus and William Butler Yeats. Airing in the timeslot previously occupied by Carter's first series, The X-Files, the episode received a high Nielsen household and syndication rating and was generally positively received by fans and critics alike.

== Plot ==
In downtown Seattle, a strip club patron whom workers call "The Frenchman" (Paul Dillon) pays for a private show with Calamity (April Telek). Watching her dance, the Frenchman mumbles passages from poetry and the Bible, hallucinating blood pouring over Calamity, with a wall of fire surrounding her. Later that night, Calamity is found brutally murdered, with her head and fingers missing.

Frank Black (Lance Henriksen), a retired FBI profiler, moves back to Seattle with his wife Catherine (Megan Gallagher) and daughter Jordan (Brittany Tiplady) after ten years in Washington, D.C. Seeing a newspaper headline about the murder, Frank reconnects with an old colleague, Lieutenant Bob Bletcher, and offers assistance on the case. In the morgue, Frank has visions of the murder and is able to determine cause of death without even looking at the body, as well as other important details.

After questioning one of Calamity's coworkers, Frank obtains a video recording of The Frenchman during his private show. That night, The Frenchman kidnaps a male prostitute and takes him into the woods. The next morning, the male prostitute is found burnt to death and decapitated. Frank's visions lead him to deduce it is the work of the same killer. Searching the woods, they discover a buried coffin that shows signs of someone having tried to claw their way out of it. As they drive back into the city, Frank tells Bletcher that he works with the Millennium Group, a private investigation group composed of retired law enforcement agents. One of the Group's members, Peter Watts (Terry O'Quinn), introduces himself to Frank and mentions something the police overlooked on Calamity's body: hypodermic needle marks.

While investigating the area where the second victim disappeared, Frank spots the killer searching for his next victim, but the killer escapes after a foot chase. The next day, Frank presents the video from the strip club to Bletcher's homicide squad, explaining that The Frenchman is driven by an obsession with apocalyptic prophecies to offset guilt about his confused sexuality, specifically targeting sex workers because they represent the threat of a plague in his mind. The detectives view this theory with skepticism and Bletcher reluctantly declines to pursue it. As Frank is leaving, however, he is confronted by Bletcher, who demands to know how Frank can have so much insight. Frank tells him that he can see what the killer sees and get into his head, although he refuses to call it a psychic ability.

Returning home, Frank learns from his neighbor that Jordan has been rushed to the hospital with flu-like symptoms. Watching a nurse draw blood from Jordan, Frank realizes the killer is doing the same with his victims, testing them for AIDS (the plague he is trying to prevent). Returning to the woods with Bletcher and the police, they discover a live victim buried in another coffin, his mouth and eyes sewn shut, as well as Calamity's severed head. Back at the station, Frank tells Bletcher that he decided to leave the FBI after discovering his family was being stalked by someone who taunted him with Polaroids of his wife, which was the modus operandi of a serial killer he'd previously caught. Being recruited by the Millennium Group motivated him to move to Seattle and start fresh.

Frank takes a call that tells him the blood samples were processed through an evidence lab, causing him to realize one of the forensic technicians is the killer. When confronted, The Frenchman attacks with a knife, ranting about the impending apocalypse; he is about to stab Frank when he is shot and killed by Bletcher. The next morning, Frank presents the recovering Jordan with a puppy. As Catherine prepares to leave for a job interview, Frank opens the mail and discovers an envelope full of Polaroids of she and Jordan, one of which makes clear the stalker has followed them to Seattle.

== Production ==
"Pilot" was written by series creator Chris Carter. Beyond creating the concept for Millennium, Carter would write a total of six other episodes for the series in addition to "Pilot"—three in the first season, and a further three in the third season. Director David Nutter would also go on to direct several episodes in the first season of the series—"Gehenna", "522666" and "Loin Like a Hunting Flame".

"Pilot" was filmed over the course of a month, which was an unheard-of length of time for a single television episode. The episode was shot in Vancouver, British Columbia in early spring to give it a "gray" and "bleak" look. The decision to film in Vancouver was to give the show the same dark feel as its sister show The X-Files, which had also been created by Carter. The strip club, Ruby Tip, was inspired by a club in Seattle named the Lusty Lady, which is located on that city's main street. Director David Nutter had been a long-time staff member of The X-Files crew. Carter said the episode was "directed beautifully by David Nutter who added to the project in so many ways, even as it came on, things that he saw visually that were able to actually change and make the script more concise". Although "Pilot" did not open with a literary quote as the series would do from the next episode onwards, its plot heavily features the 1919 poem "The Second Coming" by Irish poet William Butler Yeats.

Carter called it a "pleasure" to cast Kate Luyben and April Telek, because they were "good"-looking, which he felt was a refreshing change from frequently casting "character actors" on The X-Files. Luyben would later make an appearance on The X-Files and played a prominent role on Harsh Realm. The idea behind the character "The Frenchman" came from a prophecy by Nostradamus. According to Carter, "the idea that there is something approaching at the millennium, this series being produced I think four years before the end of the century, that we were headed toward something grave and foreboding". The name of recurring character Bob Bletcher came from an attorney Carter had worked with previously. Another name, Giebelhouse was another name Carter had gotten from his childhood years. Carter said "This idea of the hard-boiled detective is a kind of cliché". But felt that the characters came "very real to life", when compared to real law enforcement personnel.

Millennium was given the Friday night timeslot previously occupied by The X-Files, prompting Carter to quip that his earlier series was "being abducted". However, Millennium received higher viewing figures during its first season than The X-Files had done, while the latter show's fourth season, the one airing concurrently to Millennium, saw its ratings reach their highest to that point.

== Broadcast and reception ==
Right from the start, with the sequences of blood running down walls to the syncopated dance beat of a peepshow, this is a programme which is marking itself out as being cruder and nastier than its more obviously populist sister show - but what's remarkable is that however brutal the episode is, there's a compelling beauty to it too.

— Robert Shearman, comparing the episode to Carter's previous series The X-Files

"Pilot" was first broadcast on the Fox network on October 25, 1996; and gathered a total viewership of 17.72 million in the United States. In the "adults 18–49" demographic, the episode earned a Nielsen rating of 9, with a 27 share; meaning it was viewed by nine percent of television-equipped households and 27 percent of those actively watching television. The rating across all demographics was 11.9. The episode's broadcast set the record at the time for the most-watched program on Fox.

Writing for The A.V. Club, Zack Handeln rated the episode a B, finding it to be "weirdly prescient of the crime dramas we wallow in today". Handlen felt that episode's tone was so "overwrought" as to be "hilarious", but still found the series to be "uncompromising" and "compelling". Handlen also noted similarities to the films Manhunter and Seven in both the episode's plot and the series' premise. Bill Gibron, writing for DVD Talk, rated the episode 5/5, calling it "perhaps the most perfect opening episode to a one-hour suspense thriller ... ever conceived". Gibron also praised the casting of Henriksen and O'Quinn in the series. An Entertainment Weekly preview for the episode noted that some of its scenes were "the grimmest ... in prime-time history". Robert Shearman and Lars Pearson, in their book Wanting to Believe: A Critical Guide to The X-Files, Millennium & The Lone Gunmen, rated the episode four stars out of five, calling it "bleak and confrontational" though finding that its symbolism was "too boldly stated". Comparing the series to its sister show, The X-Files, Shearman and Pearson noted that Henriksen portrays his role "with a confidence that makes him immediately a more credible character than Mulder or Scully would be for an entire season". Writing for The Register-Guard, Renee Graham called the episode "as lurid a television show as you're ever going to see", adding that it seemed "just too horrific to be enjoyable". However, Graham noted that the episode was "by far the superior show" compared to the similar series Profiler, which aired around the same time.

== Footnotes ==
=== References ===
- Genge, N. E. (1997). Millennium: The Unofficial Companion. Century. ISBN 0712678336.
- Shearman, Robert; Pearson, Lars (2009). Wanting to Believe: A Critical Guide to The X-Files, Millennium & The Lone Gunmen. Mad Norwegian Press. ISBN 978-0975944691.
