= Chris Ellis (actor) =

American film and television actor

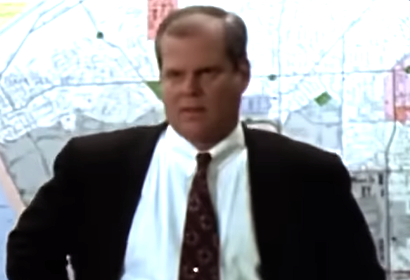
- Ellis in Bean (1997)
- Born: November 27, 1949 (age 76); Memphis, Tennessee, U.S.
- Occupation: Actor
- Years active: 1979–present

Chris Ellis (born November 27, 1949) is an American actor.

== Early life ==
Ellis grew up in Frayser, Tennessee, a suburb of Memphis, in a middle class/working class area. He always wanted to be an actor because of what he saw on television.

It took him seven years to finish college however, because "I have always been shiftless". During those years Chris became involved in community theatre in Memphis, Tennessee, where "I did and do still think the quality of the work has always been quite good". By the time he moved to New York, he had worked with many excellent actors in about two dozen plays, classical and contemporary. "I cannot imagine what might have supplanted that background for a newcomer in New York."

== Career ==
His first part in either television or film came in 1979, where he played a truck driver in the television movie The Suicide's Wife, which starred Angie Dickinson. The role resulted in little further work. After working in regional theater for a year or so, Ellis did not work for about ten years. During that time he lived in "bone-grinding poverty" in Manhattan's Hell's Kitchen. In one nine-month period of 1987, Ellis accepted 102 dinner invitations. "I don't know why they kept arriving, nor why I counted them, though I do know why I accepted them."

In 1990, a break came when he got a part in Days of Thunder. This seemed to jump-start Ellis's career as parts in My Cousin Vinny, Addams Family Values and Apollo 13 as former NASA Mercury Seven astronaut Deke Slayton. He began picking up credits on well-known television series including Melrose Place, NYPD Blue and The X-Files.

After working with Hanks on Apollo 13, the two worked together on That Thing You Do!, the television miniseries From the Earth to the Moon and Catch Me If You Can. Ellis played fictional NASA Mission Control when he played a flight director in 1998's Armageddon.

Ellis's additional appearances include Bean: The Movie, Home Fries, Jessabelle, Gospel Hill, October Sky, Live Free or Die Hard, Tim Burton's Planet of the Apes and Transformers. His television credits also include The West Wing, Ghost Whisperer, Chicago Hope, The Pretender, Alias, JAG, CSI: NY, Burn Notice, Cold Case, Veronica Mars and Political Animals.

He appeared in three season one episodes of Millennium as group member Jim Panseayres. He established a reputation for portraying Southern lawmakers or serious military or police-type characters. He played a priest in The Dark Knight Rises (2012).

He appeared in Criminal Minds as Sheriff Jimmy Rhodes. He had two guest appearances in NCIS as Gunnery Sergeant John Deluca. Ellis's appearance in the season 1 episode "The Curse" was uncredited while his second and final appearance in the season 2 episode "The Bone Yard" was credited.

== Filmography ==
=== Film ===
Year	Title	Role	Notes
1990	Days of Thunder	Harlem Hoogerhyde	
1992	My Cousin Vinny	J.T.	
1993	Ghost in the Machine	Lieutenant	
1995	Apollo 13	Deke Slayton	
1996	Sticks & Stones	Coach Osterman	
1996	That Thing You Do!	Phil Horace	
1997	Con Air	BOP Official Grant	
1997	Bean	Detective Butler	
1997	Sparkler	Buddy #1	
1997	Wag the Dog	M.P. Officer	
1998	Max Q	Bob Matthews	
1998	Godzilla	General Hunter Anderson	
1998	Armageddon	Flight Director Clark	
1998	Home Fries	Henry Lever	
1999	October Sky	Principal Turner	
2000	The Watcher	Detective Hollis Mackie	
2001	Daddy and Them	Dewey	
2001	Domestic Disturbance	Detective Warren	
2001	Planet of the Apes	Commander Karl Vasich	
2002	Love Liza	Patriot Model Aeronautics Clerk	
2002	Catch Me If You Can	Special Agent Witkins	
2003	The Bus Stops Here	Self-Centered Man At Bus Stop	Short film
2005	The Island	Aces & Spades Bartender	
2005	The Devil's Rejects	Coggs	
2005	Fun with Dick and Jane	Grand Cayman Bank Vice President	
2006	The Darkroom	Jackson	
2006	Believe in Me	Jim Stovall	
2007	Transformers	Admiral Brigham	
2007	Live Free or Die Hard	Scalvino	
2008	Crazy	Glen, Carousel Manager	Uncredited
2008	Gospel Hill	L. Donn Murray	
2009	G-Force	FBI Director	Credited as Chris Ellis Jr.
2012	The Dark Knight Rises	Father Reilly	
2013	Grace Unplugged	Pastor Tim Bryant	
2014	The Guest	Hendricks	
2014	Jessabelle	Sheriff Pruitt	
2015	McFarland, USA	Coach Jenks	Credited as Chris Ellis Jr.
2016	Trigger	Patrick	Short film
2017	The Show	Keller	
2017	Pitching Tents	Principal Don Bishop	
2017	Amelia 2.0	Senator Thafdeus	
2018	What Still Remains	Harvey	
2018	The Oath	Hank Creason	
2019	Silo	Mr. Adler	

=== Television ===
Year	Title	Role	Notes
1979	The Suicide's Wife	Truck Driver	Television movie
1982	Rascals and Robbers: The Secret Adventures of Tom Sawyer and Huckleberry Finn	Clown	Television movie
1983	Chiefs	Bobby Patrick	Episode: "Part 3"; Television miniseries
1993	NYPD Blue	Marshal	Episodes: "Brown Appetit" and "Emission Accomplished"
1994	In the Line of Duty: The Price of Vengeance	News Vendor	Television movie
1996	Murder One	Mr. Switzer	Episode: "Chapter Eleven"
1996	Innocent Victims	Alan Hallis	Television movie
1996	The X-Files	Sheriff Lance Hindt	Episode: "Quagmire"
1996	Space: Above and Beyond	Admiral Stenner	Episode: "... Tell Our Moms We Done Our Best"
1996	If These Walls Could Talk	Crowd Leader	Segment: "1996"; Television movie
1996	Her Costly Affair	Wes	Television movie
1996	Millennium	Jim Penseyres	3 episodes
1997	The Pretender	Daniel Crockett	Episode: "Mirage"
1997	Chicago Hope	Secret Service Agent Bill Erskine	Episode: "The Day of the Rope"
1998	The Pentagon Wars	General Keane	Television movie
1998	From the Earth to the Moon	Bob Parker	Television miniseries Episode: "Le voyage dans la lune"
2002	First Monday	Mr. Patton	Episode: "Strip Search"
2002	The Practice	Mr. Blain, Zoning Board Chairman	Episode: "Neighboring Species"
2002	Alias	Agent Chapman	Episode: "The Counteragent"
2002	Birds of Prey	Larry Ketterly	Episode: "Pilot"
2003	Lucky	Unknown	Episode: "The Tell"
2003–2004	NCIS	Gunnery Sergeant John DeLuca	Episodes: "The Curse" and "The Bone Yard"
2004	JAG	Detective Kush	Episode: "Good Intentions"
2004	Line of Fire	Vigs	Episode: "The Senator"
2004	Helter Skelter	Sergeant Whiteley	Television movie
2004	Tiger Cruise	Captain Anderson	Television movie
2005	CSI: NY	Vincent Williams	Episode: "Dancing with the Fishes"
2006	Criminal Minds	Sheriff Rhodes	Episode: "The Tribe"
2006	The West Wing	Congressman Fields	Episode: "Requiem"
2006–2007	The Unit	Congressman Bruce Gelber	Episodes: "Report by Exception" and "Pandemonium: Part 1"
2006	Ghost Whisperer	Captain Ken Nilsen	Episodes: "Free Fall" and "The One"
2006	Vanished	Shelton	Episode: "The Velocity of Sara"
2007	Veronica Mars	Reverend Ted Capistrano	Episode: "There's Got to Be a Morning After Pill"
2007–2008	Burn Notice	Virgil Watkins	Episodes: "Unpaid Debts" and "Rough Seas"
2009	Terminator: The Sarah Connor Chronicles	Hayes	Episodes: "Today Is the Day: Part 1" and "Today Is the Day: Part 2"
2009	The Office	Former Congressman Chris O'Keefe	Episode: "Shareholder Meeting"
2010	The Mentalist	'Sheriff Mullery'	Episode: "Red Moon"
2010	Zeke and Luther	'Buzz'	Episode: "Rocket Men"
2010	Justified	Douglas Cooper	Episode: "Riverbrook"
2011	CSI: Crime Scene Investigation	Warden Clinton Malton	Episode: "The List"
2013	Warehouse 13	Colonel Arnold Cassell	Episode: "What Matters Most"
2015	Mad Men	Del Hill	Episode: "The Milk and Honey Route"
2015	Murder in the First	Judge Mitchell Ellis	6 episodes
2015	K.C. Undercover	Christos	Episodes: "Runaway Robot: Parts 1 & 2"
2017	Hand of God	Principal Matt Wasser	Episode: "Telling Me Your Dreams"
2018	Young Sheldon	Marty Steinbecker	Episode: "Family Dynamics and a Red Fiero"
2020	9-1-1: Lone Star	Derek Poole	Episode: "Studs"
