= Ted Mann (writer) =

Producer and writer (1952–2025)

- Born: October 24, 1952; Canada
- Died: September 4, 2025 (aged 72); Los Angeles, California
- Occupations: Television writer and producer
- Writing career
- Notable works: NYPD Blue; Deadwood; Crash

Ted Mann (October 24, 1952 – September 4, 2025) was a Canadian-born television writer and producer. He worked in both capacities on the series NYPD Blue, Deadwood and Crash.

In 1995, Mann won the Primetime Emmy Award for Outstanding Drama Series for his work on the second season of NYPD Blue.

== Career ==
=== 1970s ===
Mann was an editor of National Lampoon. He began working in the television industry with National Lampoon and HBO as a writer on the TV special Disco Beaver from Outer Space in 1978. In 1979 he worked as a writer on Delta House – a short-lived television variation on Lampoon's film Animal House.

=== 1980s ===
In 1980 he worked as a writer on the animated series Drawing Power. He was the writer for O.C. and Stiggs a theatrical film based on characters he created with Tod Carroll for National Lampoon and directed by Robert Altman.

Mann worked as a writer on the crime drama The Street, Universal TV's innovative half-hour syndicated faux verite cop show, as well as Stephen J. Cannell's Wiseguy, Miami Vice, and a Saturday morning animated cartoon entitled Slimer! and the Real Ghostbusters (1990).

=== 1990s ===
Mann became a producer on Steven Bochco's Civil Wars which aired for two short seasons on the ABC network commencing in 1991.

Following which, in 1993 he began working on the ABC police drama NYPD Blue which was created by David Milch and Steven Bochco. Mann was a writer and producer on the show's first season. He wrote or co-wrote eight episodes for the season and also had a cameo role as a prisoner in the episode "Emission Accomplished". He was nominated for two Emmy Award's for his work on the season. The first was for Best Drama Series and Mann shared the award with the production team. The second was for Outstanding Individual Achievement in Writing in a Drama Series for his work on the episode "NYPD Lou" which featured Dan Hedaya as a troubled regular visitor to the police station named Lou who believes he is a werewolf. Mann returned as a writer and producer for the second season of NYPD Blue in 1994. He wrote or co-wrote a further eight episodes for the second season. Mann and the production team won the Emmy Award for best drama series in 1995 for their work on the second season. He left the production team with the close of the second season but continued to write for the series.

He wrote the space opera satire feature film Space Truckers which was released in 1996. Also in 1996 he served as a consulting producer and writer for the dark crime series Millennium. He wrote four episodes of the first season and then left the crew.

Mann scripted the fifth season NYPD Blue episodes "Lost Israel: Part 1" and "Lost Israel: Part 2" with Milch in 1997. He was again nominated for the Emmy Award for writing for a drama series for his work on "Lost Israel: Part 2" in 1998. He returned to write the sixth-season episode "Big Bang Theory" in 1999. He wrote or co-wrote nineteen episodes for the series in total. He also wrote an episode of Bochco and Milch's short-lived police drama Brooklyn South in 1998.

In 1999, he served as a consulting producer on the science-fiction series Total Recall 2070.

=== 2000s ===
Mann wrote an episode of Judging Amy in 2000. He worked as a supervising producer on Skin, a short-lived modern take on Romeo and Juliet set in the adult-film industry in 2003. He also wrote an episode of Andromeda which aired in 2004.

In 2004, he reunited with David Milch to work as a writer on the first season of Deadwood. Deadwood was created by Milch and is an examination of the genesis of civilization within a Western setting. Mann wrote the concluding episode of the first-season episode "Sold Under Sin". He returned as a writer and producer for the second season in 2005. He wrote the episode "Requiem for a Gleat" and the season finale "Boy-the-Earth-Talks-To". He had a small acting role as regular bar patron Rutherford. Mann and the writing staff were nominated for a Writers Guild of America (WGA) Award for Best Dramatic Series for their work on the second season. The production team were also nominated for the Emmy Award for Outstanding Drama Series for the second season. He again served as a writer, actor and producer for the third and final season in 2006. Mann co-wrote the third-season premiere "Tell Your God to Ready For Blood" with Milch. He co-wrote the episode "True Colors" with story editor Regina Corrado and wrote the episode "Full Faith and Credit". He wrote the series finale "Tell Him Something Pretty". The writing staff were again nominated for the WGA Award for best dramatic series for the third season. Mann contributed to eight episodes for the series as a writer.

In 2007, Mann worked as a producer and writer for Milch's next series John from Cincinnati. He wrote the third episode of the show's only season.

Mann moved on to work as a co-executive producer and writer for the Starz original drama series Crash.

In 2012, he was nominated for a Primetime Emmy Award for Outstanding Writing for a Miniseries, Movie or a Dramatic Special for the Hatfields and McCoys miniseries. He wrote the teleplay and story for three episodes of the award-winning miniseries.

== Death ==
Mann died in Los Angeles on September 4, 2025, after battling lung cancer. He was 72.
