= Sister show =

Television show existing in the same fictional universe as another

Sister shows, also known as companion series, are two or more television series which exist in the same fictional universe and which may have crossovers. They differ to a degree from spin-offs, in that they are established independently from one another. The popularity of most series is limited to a few seasons, and sister shows allow expanding the immediate audience and ratings share. This is accomplished by using mostly different actors and production facilities. Sister shows often shift styles or target audience slightly, for a larger overall market. Thus The Beverly Hillbillies emphasizes slapstick, while Green Acres emphasizes surreal humor.

== Examples ==
- Arrow, Constantine, The Flash, Black Lightning, Supergirl, Legends of Tomorrow and Batwoman.
- Daredevil, The Punisher, Jessica Jones, Iron Fist, Luke Cage, and The Defenders.
- The Real World and Road Rules.
- Band of Brothers and The Pacific.
- The King of Queens and Everybody Loves Raymond.
- Hercules: The Legendary Journeys, Xena: Warrior Princess and Young Hercules.

The character Xena proved popular on Hercules and a second series started.

- All My Children and One Life to Live (which join General Hospital).

From 2004 to 2005, they featured a crossover storyline told on both series.

- Stargate SG-1, Stargate Atlantis and Stargate Universe.

Stargate Atlantis premiered during the eighth season of Stargate SG-1. Both occasionally had crossover plots. Stargate Universe likewise featured crossover character appearances.

- Star Trek: The Next Generation, Star Trek: Deep Space Nine, Star Trek: Voyager and Star Trek: Enterprise.

Deep Space Nine began during the sixth season of The Next Generation. Several characters from the older series appeared in the newer, but only one episode of the older ("Birthright") had characters from the newer. All the Star Trek series are in the same universe, and there were many shared concepts and characters.

- Petticoat Junction, Green Acres and The Beverly Hillbillies.

All three take place around the town of Hooterville. Guests appear in Green Acres, although the plots are not linked.

- The Trumptonshire series had Camberwick Green, Trumpton and Chigley villages in the same area. Gordon Murray stated that the area of "Trumptonshire" is "representative of real locations which are one-and-a-half miles from each other in an equidistant triangle". Several characters appear in guest roles in other villages.
- The Young and the Restless and The Bold and the Beautiful.

Known for frequent crossovers, the latter was planned by William J. Bell to be a sister show. Characters have gone between the two series regularly since the 1990s.

- As the World Turns, Guiding Light and Another World (which join Days of Our Lives).

Guiding Light was joined by a sister show, As the World Turns, in 1956 and was also joined by another sister show, Another World, in 1964.

- Family Guy, The Cleveland Show and American Dad!.
- The Simpsons and Futurama.
- He-Man and the Masters of the Universe and She-Ra: Princess of Power.
- The Walking Dead and Fear the Walking Dead.
- Phineas and Ferb and Milo Murphy's Law.
- The Loud House and The Casagrandes.
- Avatar: The Last Airbender and The Legend of Korra.
- The X-Files, Millennium and The Lone Gunmen.

Although The X-Files and The Lone Gunmen are explicitly linked, mostly through several shared characters and plot threads, the connection to Millennium is only concretely expounded in one episode of The X-Files and one episode of Millennium.

- Eureka, Warehouse 13 and Alphas.
- Ally McBeal, The Practice, Boston Public and Boston Legal.

All created by David E. Kelley and set in Boston.

- Casualty, Holby City and HolbyBlue.
- Doctor Who, Torchwood, The Sarah Jane Adventures, K9 and Class.
- Hawaii Five-O, Magnum, P.I., Simon & Simon and Murder, She Wrote.
- Battlestar Galactica and Caprica.

Caprica takes place 58 years before the events in Battlestar Galactica.

- The Flintstones and The Jetsons.
- The Fairly OddParents, Danny Phantom, T.U.F.F. Puppy and Bunsen Is a Beast.
- The Honeymooners and Here's Lucy.
- 77 Sunset Strip, Hawaiian Eye, Surfside 6 and Bourbon Street Beat.
- The Man from U.N.C.L.E. and The Girl from U.N.C.L.E..
- Thundercats (1985), SilverHawks and TigerSharks.
- Batman and The Green Hornet.
- Jake and the Fatman, Diagnosis: Murder and Matlock.
- Las Vegas and Crossing Jordan.
- One Tree Hill and Life Unexpected.
- Bones, The Finder, Rosewood and Sleepy Hollow.
- The Mary Tyler Moore Show, Rhoda, Phyllis and Lou Grant.
- All in the Family, The Jeffersons, Maude, Archie Bunker's Place and Good Times.
- Happy Days, Laverne & Shirley, Joanie Loves Chachi and Mork & Mindy.

Happy Days is a spin-off of Love, American Style.

- The Love Boat, Charlie's Angels and Fantasy Island.
- The Dukes of Hazzard, Enos and The Dukes.
- Cheers, Wings, Frasier, Caroline in the City, Friends, Mad About You, The John Larroquette Show and Joey.
- Lilo & Stitch: The Series, American Dragon: Jake Long, The Proud Family, Kim Possible and Recess.
- Golden Girls, The Golden Palace, Nurses and Empty Nest.
- Chicago Fire, Chicago P.D., Chicago Med and Chicago Justice, Law & Order, Law & Order: Special Victims Unit, Law & Order: Criminal Intent, Law & Order: Trial by Jury and Law & Order: Organized Crime.
- Ultimate Spider-Man, Avengers Assemble, Hulk and the Agents of S.M.A.S.H. and Guardians of the Galaxy.
- Narcos and Narcos: Mexico.
- Batman: The Animated Series, Superman: The Animated Series, The New Batman Adventures, Justice League, Justice League Unlimited, Batman Beyond and The Zeta Project.
- Thomas the Tank Engine and TUGS.
- iCarly and Victorious.
- Every Witch Way and WITS Academy.
- Jessie, Bunk'd, Austin & Ally and Good Luck Charlie.
- The Office and Parks & Recreation.
- WWE Raw, WWE Smackdown and WWE NXT.
- The Thundermans, Henry Danger and Danger Force.
- Raven's Home and That's So Raven.
- My Little Pony: Friendship Is Magic and My Little Pony: Equestria Girls
- The Suite Life of Zack & Cody and The Suite Life on Deck.
- Rugrats and The Wild Thornberrys.
- Bob's Burgers, The Great North and Central Park.
- Sons of Anarchy and Mayans M.C..
- American Horror Story, American Crime Story and American Horror Stories.
- House and Nurse Jeffrey.
- Desperate Housewives and Devious Maids.
- Riverdale, Chilling Adventures of Sabrina and Katy Keene.
- Hazbin Hotel and Helluva Boss.
- Big Mouth and Human Resources.
- SpongeBob SquarePants and The Patrick Star Show.
- Scandal and How To Get Away With Murder.
- Jimmy Neutron: Boy Genius and Planet Sheen.
- Codename: Kids Next Door, Ed, Edd n Eddy and The Grim Adventures of Billy & Mandy.
