= Beware of the Dog (Millennium) =

- Millennium episode
- Episode no.: Season 2 Episode 2
- Directed by: Allen Coulter
- Written by: Glen Morgan; James Wong
- Production code: 5C02
- Original air date: September 26, 1997
- Running time: 42 minutes

Guest appearances
- Randy Stone as Michael Beebe; R. G. Armstrong as The Old Man; Brent Butt as Short Order Cook; Ralph J. Alderman as Nate; Anita Wittenberg as Cora; Arnie Walters as Paul Lombardo; Margaret Martin as Mary Anne Lombardo; Sally Stevens as Radio Singer

Episode chronology
← Previous "The Beginning and the End"	Next → "Sense and Antisense"
- Millennium season 2

"'Beware of the Dog" is the second episode of the second season of the American crime-thriller television series Millennium. It premiered on the Fox network on September 26, 1997. The episode was written by Glen Morgan and James Wong, and directed by Allen Coulter. "Beware of the Dog" featured guest appearances by Randy Stone and R. G. Armstrong.

Millennium centers on offender profiler Frank Black (Lance Henriksen), who investigates unusual crimes as part of the private investigative organisation the Millennium Group. In this episode, when Black investigates several killings by a pack of savage dogs, he discovers a strange old man who teaches him more than he ever knew about the Group.

Guest star Armstrong would reprise his role later in the season, while Stone was the casting director for both Millennium and its sister show The X-Files. "Beware of the Dog" received mixed reviews from television critics, and was viewed by approximately 6.37 million households during its original broadcast.

== Plot ==
A couple in a camper van get lost along a country road. They stop near a small town to read their map, but a pack of dogs break into their van and maul them to death.

Meanwhile, Millennium Group investigator Peter Watts (Terry O'Quinn) tries to convince fellow Group member Frank Black (Lance Henriksen) to investigate the case. Black, having separated from his wife after killing her kidnapper, initially refuses, but Watts' insistence sways him. Black arrives in the isolated town of Bucksnort and visits a local diner. Standing out amongst the residents is Michael Beebe (Randy Stone), who has moved there from Los Angeles. Beebe believes his elderly neighbor may be responsible for the dog attack and asks Black to investigate.

Black instead examines the crime scene. At sunset, he sees a group of five dogs beginning to follow him. He returns to his hotel, but when he discovers he is locked out the dogs attack him. He fights them off, killing one, and flees to a hospital where he is refused entrance. An elderly man (R. G. Armstrong) drives past, stopping to pick up the dead dog, and drives off again; the remaining dogs follow his pickup truck. Black passes out and is helped into the hospital. The locals believe he is unconscious and discuss the "situation"; however, Black is awake and overhears everything, realizing there is a greater threat at hand.

The next day, Black finds a group of obelisks in the woods. He is about to examine one when Beebe appears, chased by dogs. The elderly man also arrives, and Black asks him to call off the dogs. The man denies the dogs are his, but they retreat regardless. Black then sees that the obelisks all bear an ouroboros, the symbol of the Millennium Group. He visits the man's home, where the two speak about the Group and the coming millennium.

The man then brings Black to a clearing full of the wild dogs, where the latter realizes they are embodiments of the evil in the world. He approaches them, and stands his ground, being struck by several visions as he does so. The man explains that the world's balance between good and evil is being lost as the millennium approaches, and that Beebe's house, built on sacred ground, is one of the many small things upsetting this balance. Black rushes to the house, knowing the dogs will attack it. Beebe refuses to leave, but the house has been surrounded by five dogs; as they are killed they are seemingly endlessly replaced by others. The man arrives and insists the only way to rid the town of the dogs is burn down the house, which the trio do before fleeing. Back home in Seattle, Black refuses to sell his own home, telling his wife that they will move back into it together when their problems are resolved.

== Production ==
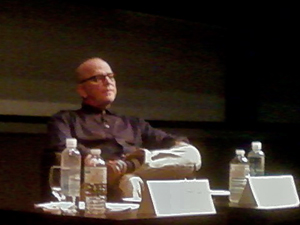
Director Allen Coulter would return to direct another two episodes of the series.

"Beware of the Dog" was written by frequent collaborators Glen Morgan and James Wong, and directed by Allen Coulter. The episode was Coulter's first credit for the series, and he would return to helm "The Pest House" and "Siren" later in the second season. "Beware of the Dog" was the fifth episode to have been written by Morgan and Wong, after "Dead Letters", "522666" and "The Thin White Line" in the first season; and the second season première "The Beginning and the End". The duo would go on to pen a further ten episodes over the course of the second season, having taken the roles of co-executive producers for the season.

Guest star Randy Stone was the casting director for Millennium and its sister show The X-Files. Stone was responsible for the casting of Henriksen in the role of Frank Black, and of the two lead roles in The X-Files. "Beware of the Dog" features the first appearance by R. G. Armstrong as The Old Man, a recurring character who would reappear in the two-part episodes "Owls" and "Roosters". Armstrong has been described as "a long-time favorite" of Morgan's.

The episode makes use of Bobby Darin's song "As Long As I'm Singing" in a diegetic manner. Darin's music has been noted by Millennium's resident composer Mark Snow as a hallmark of the works of Morgan and Wong. "Beware of the Dog" marked the pair's first use of the singer in Millennium, but his music would later feature in the episodes "Sense and Antisense", "Monster" and "Goodbye Charlie".

== Broadcast and reception ==
"Beware of the Dog" originally aired on the Fox network on September 26, 1997. The episode earned a Nielsen rating of 6.5 during its original broadcast, meaning that 6.5 percent of households in the United States viewed the episode. This represented approximately 6.37 million households, and left the episode the sixty-ninth most-viewed broadcast that week. (Note: Each ratings point represented 980,000 households during the 1997–98 television season.)

The episode received mixed reviews from television critics. The A.V. Club's Zack Handlen gave the episode a B+, finding it "endearingly batshit". Handlen felt that the episode was not entirely cohesive and that its ending was somewhat disappointing, but felt that overall the episode's imagery made up for this—summing up this idea by saying "Millennium often seems to be at its best when sense is a secondary consideration". Bill Gibron, writing for DVD Talk, rated the episode 3.5 out of 5, noting that its "atmospheric elements do not quite add up to a cohesive whole". Gibron felt that this resulted in "an episode that feels like the first half of a bad b-movie". Robert Shearman and Lars Pearson, in their book Wanting to Believe: A Critical Guide to The X-Files, Millennium & The Lone Gunmen, awarded "Beware of the Dog" one-and-a-half stars out of five. Shearman felt the episode was so similar to The X-Files that it gave the impression that Millennium had "lost its own identity". He found that the script contained "enough wit in the dialogue" but that its plot seemed too "vague and elliptical". Writing for the Star Tribune, Bill Ward felt that the episode featured a "lighter" tone than usual, comparing it to The X-Files. Ward described the episode as taking "some nice turns en route to an ambivalent semiresolution".

== Footnotes ==
=== References ===
- Chris Carter, John Peter Kousakis, Lance Henriksen, Michael R. Perry, Ken Horton, Thomas J. Wright, Mark Snow, Chip Johannessen, Kristen Cloke, Megan Gallagher, Frank Spotnitz, Mark Freeborn (2004). The Turn of the Tide: The Making of Season 2 (DVD). Millennium: The Complete Second Season: 20th Century Fox Home Entertainment.
- Shearman, Robert; Pearson, Lars (2009). Wanting to Believe: A Critical Guide to The X-Files, Millennium & The Lone Gunmen. Mad Norwegian Press. ISBN 978-0975944691.
