= Maranatha (Millennium) =

- Millennium episode
- Episode no.: Season 1 Episode 21
- Directed by: Peter Markle
- Written by: Chip Johannessen
- Production code: 4C20
- Original air date: May 9, 1997

Guest appearances
- Bill Nunn as Lt. McCormick; Boris Krutonog as Yuri Surov; Levani as Sergei Stepanovich Yaponchik; Michael Aniol as Priest; Dmitri Boudrine as Andrei Petrovich Melnikov; Michael Cram as Paramedic; Bill Croft as Broadface; Brian Downey as Medical Examiner; Roger Haskett as E.R. Doctor; Beverly Pales as Torch Singer

Episode chronology
← Previous "Broken World"	Next → "Paper Dove"
- Millennium season 1

"'Maranatha" is the twenty-first episode of the first season of the American crime-thriller television series Millennium. It premiered on the Fox network on May 9, 1997. The episode was written by Chip Johannessen, and directed by Peter Markle. "Maranatha" featured guest appearances by Bill Nunn, Boris Krutonog and Levani Outchaneichvili.

Millennium Group consultant Frank Black (Lance Henriksen) aids both the New York Police Department and a Russian investigator to track down the mysterious "Yaponchik", a criminal from the Russian underworld who may be an incarnation of the biblical beast from the sea.

"Maranatha", a title which translates from Aramaic as "our lord has come", connects the 1986 Chernobyl disaster to biblical prophecies of the star of Wormwood. The episode features the first of two directorial contributions from Markle, and sees future guest star Brian Downey appear in a minor role.

== Plot ==
In New York City, a man named Yaponchik (Levani Outchaneichvili) shoots a man in the face, preventing the victim's identification; this is the third such murder committed this way. Millennium Group consultant Frank Black (Lance Henriksen) is asked to aid the NYPD in investigating the case. He is joined by an investigator from Moscow, Yuri Surov (Boris Krutonog), and an undercover agent, Andrei Melnikov (Dmitri Boudrine).

Examining the victim's body, a symbol is found on the corpse resembling an inverted V, but its meaning is unknown. Black, Melnikov and Surov visit a Russian nightclub where the latter two are working undercover. As Surov and Black talk at one table, Melnikov is approached by Yaponchik. Someone in the club recognizes Yaponchik, and the crowd stampede out of the building when they hear his name. After the crowd has dispersed, Black and Surov find Melnikov's body at a table, his face shot off.

Surov explains to Black that Yaponchik has come to be regarded by Russians as a sort of evil folkloric figure. Meanwhile, Group member Peter Watts (Terry O'Quinn) determines that the V-like symbol found earlier is actually a fragment of the Chi Rho, a Christian symbol. Watts also informs Black that many Russians believe Yaponchik to have directly responsible for the Chernobyl disaster, which has been tied by some to Biblical prophecies of the apocalypse. Black researches the disaster and finds a picture of both Melnikov and Surov at the Chernobyl Nuclear Power Plant, realizing that both men have been tracking Yaponchik for revenge.

One of Yaponchik's victims is identified as a restorer of Russian icons. Her home is searched, and it is found that she had uncovered Yaponchik's identity and attempted to appease him by sending him several icons. Black feels Yaponchik is killing in order to perpetuate the legends surrounding him by instilling fear in those who believe them. Watts and Black visit the Russian embassy to find the man the icons were being mailed to—Sergei Stepanovich, identifiable as Yaponchik. Stepanovich is protected by diplomatic immunity; however, it becomes clear that Surov, Melnikov and a Russian Orthodox priest who aided the investigation have all been stalking Stepanovich, who they believe to be the Antichrist.

Yaponchik murders two men at a public bath but is confronted by Surov. Yaponchik says he cannot be killed, but Surov shoots him in the head. Yaponchik rushed to the hospital. Black surveys the crime scene and draws a connection between Yaponchik and the beast from the sea in the Book of Revelation, who is said to survive a fatal head wound; fearing that Yaponchik will likewise survive, Black heads to the hospital. Surov beats him there, however, and confronts the recovered Yaponchik. As Surov is about to shoot his quarry again, he is convinced instead that Yaponchik is "not the one" he is thought to be. Surov helps Yaponchik make his way to the helipad on the hospital's roof. Black and Watts arrive on the roof in time to see Yaponchik escorted onto a helicopter by several men, who take off before they can be apprehended.

== Production ==
"Maranatha" was directed by Peter Markle, making his first contribution to the series. Markle would later return to helm the third season episode "Seven and One". The episode was written by Chip Johannessen, who went on to write a total of twelve episodes across all three seasons, including the series' final episode "Goodbye to All That". After Millennium's cancellation, Johannessen would also contribute an episode to its sister show The X-Files, 1999's "Orison". Johannessen would also become one of the series' executive producers during its third season, alongside Ken Horton.

The episode's title, "Maranatha", is an Aramaic language word translated as "our lord has come" or "come, our lord"; the word is found in the biblical First Epistle to the Corinthians and is believed to have been used as a greeting among early Christians. During production, the episode used the working title "The Second Coming".

The character Peter Watts makes mention of the origin of the name of Chernobyl, a city in Ukraine that was the location of the Chernobyl disaster, a 1986 nuclear meltdown. According to Watts, the name "Chernobyl" translates as "wormwood", causing the disaster to be likened to the Biblical star of Wormwood prophesied in the Book of Revelation, which was said to cause death through poisoning the waters. However, the word "chernobyl" can be translated as "black grass" or "black myth". Actor Brian Downey, who portrayed a medical examiner in the episode, later appeared in an unrelated role in the two-part second season episodes "Owls" and "Roosters".

== Broadcast and reception ==
"Maranatha" was first broadcast on the Fox Network on May 9, 1997. The episode earned a Nielsen rating of 6.7 during its original broadcast, meaning that 6.7 percent of households in the United States viewed the episode. This represented 6.5 million households, and left the episode the sixty-fifth most-viewed broadcast that week. (Note: Each ratings point represented 970,000 households during the 1996–1997 television season.)

The episode received mixed to positive reviews from critics. The A.V. Club's Zack Handlen rated the episode a B+, describing it as "a ho-hum X-Files knock-off". Handlen felt that the acting was strong, and that the references to both Chernobyl and apocalyptic prophecies formed a good basis for the episode; however, he noted that the script's uncertainty as to whether its villain really was the Antichrist caused it to lose impact. Bill Gibron, writing for DVD Talk, rated the episode 4.5 out of 5, praising its " incredibly tight script" and describing it as "one of the best examples of Millennium's careful balancing act between reality and the otherworldly".

However, Robert Shearman and Lars Pearson, in their book Wanting to Believe: A Critical Guide to The X-Files, Millennium & The Lone Gunmen, rated the episode two stars out of five, finding that its plot "gets lost in the mix" amidst the details and atmosphere of the setting. Shearman compared the folkloric feel of Yaponchik as a Russian incarnation of the devil to the American view of the devil as an invasion of the family unit, as personified by the character Lucy Butler in "Lamentation", finding the two symbols to work well in contrast to each other. However, he was unsure that the increasingly eschatological direction the series was taking was a positive move, as it left the central character Frank Black "largely forgotten".

== Footnotes ==
=== References ===
- Genge, N. E. (1997). Millennium: The Unofficial Companion Volume Two. Century. ISBN 0712678697.
- Ice, Thomas; Demy, Timothy J. (2004). Fast Facts on Bible Prophecy from A to Z. Harvest House. ISBN 0736913564.
- Landes, Richard Allen (2000). Encyclopaedia of Millennialism and Millennial Movements. Taylor & Francis. ISBN 0415922461.
- Shearman, Robert; Pearson, Lars (2009). Wanting to Believe: A Critical Guide to The X-Files, Millennium & The Lone Gunmen. Mad Norwegian Press. ISBN 978-0975944691.
