= Siren (Millennium) =

- Millennium episode
- Episode no.: Season 2 Episode 17
- Directed by: Allen Coulter
- Written by: Glen Morgan & James Wong
- Original air date: March 20, 1998

Guest appearances
- Vivian Wu as Tamara Shui Fa Lee; Tzi Ma as Captain Youfook Law; Ricky Cheng as Yee Chun; Kristen Cloke as Lara Means

Episode chronology
| ← Previous "Roosters" | Next → "In Arcadia Ego" |
- Millennium season 2

"'Siren" is the seventeenth episode of the second season of the American crime-thriller television series Millennium. It premiered on the Fox network on March 20, 1998. Millennium concerns offender profiler Frank Black (Lance Henriksen) as he investigates crimes for the Millennium Group. The episode was written by Glen Morgan and James Wong, and directed Allen Coulter. "Siren" featured guest appearances by Vivian Wu, Tzi Ma and Kristen Cloke.

When offender profiler Black investigates several deaths on a cargo ship, he encounters a mysterious woman who shows him visions of a life in which he had never joined the Millennium Group. Upon recovering, his experience leads him to doubt his role in the organisation. "Siren" was viewed by approximately 5.68 million households during its original broadcast. The episode received positive critical reviews, with one reviewer drawing comparisons with the film It's a Wonderful Life.

== Plot synopsis ==
Frank Black (Lance Henriksen) is an offender profiler working for a private investigative firm called the Millennium Group, who consult with local or federal law enforcement on criminal cases. The Millennium Group, and Black, specialise in examining violent crimes or those of a millenarian nature.

As a cargo ship pulls into harbour, it is surrounded by Immigration and Naturalization Service agents. On board, the captain, Law (Tzi Ma), sends two of his crew to kill a "monster" in the cargo hold. Before they can do so, the ship is boarded and the men arrested. Inside the hold, INS agents find a glamorous woman (Vivian Wu) bound in chains.

Black's wife Catherine (Megan Gallagher) has brought their daughter Jordan to the hospital where she works; there, Jordan sees the captive woman and is convinced she will be significant to her father. Catherine brings the woman's file to Black, who becomes interested in the case. However, attempts to communicate with her fail, as a translator insists the woman is speaking a wholly unknown language.

Stymied, Black and fellow Group member Lara Means (Kristen Cloke) investigate the ship, finding several bodies hidden in a crate, all having died of exposure. Black then interviews Law and his crew individually, each time being given a contradicting story of how the woman came to be on board the ship. However, they all agree that after she boarded, crew were discovered daily, dead of exposure on the ship's bow; Law had the woman chained up in the belief she was responsible.

Black traces the woman's fingerprints through a Millennium Group database, finding they belong to a Tamara Shui Fa Lee, who disappeared at sea near Hong Kong ten years prior—and who Black believes is now dead. Black visits "Lee" at the hospital, where she speaks to him in perfect English, discussing personal events from his life of which she would have no knowledge. As he drives home, he sees her on the side of the highway and stops to investigate; however, he finds no sign of her and returns home, where he shares an intimate dinner with Catherine and Jordan, later retiring to bed with Catherine—despite their estrangement. Black gradually notices more differences from how his life had been, realizing he has never been a member of the Millennium Group and founded a private investigation firm after leaving the Federal Bureau of Investigation. Returning home again one day, he sees a demon holding Jordan's lifeless body.

Back on the highway, an ambulance crew try to resuscitate Black, who has been outside his car through the night after his vision of Lee. After he comes to, he realizes this alternate reality was Lee showing him a life without the Millennium Group. However, he is left unsure whether his role within the Group is protecting his family from evil, or exposing them to it. Black seeks out Lee in a refugee camp; meanwhile, Law and his crewmen are also tracking her, conspiring to kill her to avenge their fellow crew. Lee turns the men against each other with her visions, before Black arrives to rescue her. As Black questions her as to the Group's influence, she resumes speaking in her unknown tongue, leaving Black without the answer he seeks.

== Production ==
"Siren" was written by frequent collaborators Glen Morgan and James Wong. It was the fourteenth episode to have been written by the pair, who had penned several across the first and second seasons of the series. The pair had also taken the roles of co-executive producers during the second season. The episode was directed by Allen Coulter, in his third and final contribution to the series; Coulter had previously helmed the earlier second season episodes "Beware of the Dog" and "The Pest House".

== Release and reception ==
"Siren" was first broadcast on the Fox Network on March 20, 1998. The episode earned a Nielsen rating of 5.8 during its original broadcast, meaning that 5.8 percent of households in the United States viewed the episode. This represented approximately 5.68 million households, and left the episode the eighty-second most-viewed broadcast that week. (Note: Each ratings point represented 980,000 households during the 1997–1998 television season.)

The episode received mildly positive reviews from critics. The A.V. Club's Emily VanDerWerff rated the episode a "B". She compared its central premise to the film It's A Wonderful Life, and considered this a common trope in television; VanDerWerff also felt that the plot structure, with a supernatural event being encountered during a criminal investigation, was overly reminiscent of Millennium's sister show The X-Files. However, she considered that the episode worked well overall, highlighting its alternate-reality section and its decision not to answer every question raised. Bill Gibron, writing for DVD Talk, rated the episode 3 out of 5, finding that its motif of temptation was an intriguing one, but that overall the episode's spiritual themes were muddied by its reliance on a "routine cops and robbers" framework. Robert Shearman and Lars Pearson, in their book Wanting to Believe: A Critical Guide to The X-Files, Millennium & The Lone Gunmen, rated "Siren" three stars out of five. Shearman found the episode's alternate reality section to be "touching" but "not especially revelatory", considering it and the episode as a whole to have been more interesting in premise than in execution. Shearman compared the episode to "The Curse of Frank Black" and "Midnight of the Century", though finding that the immigration plot left it less focused and interesting than those installments.
