= Rm9sbG93ZXJz =

- The X-Files episode
- Episode no.: Season 11; Episode 7
- Directed by: Glen Morgan
- Written by: Shannon Hamblin; Kristen Cloke
- Production code: 2AYW07
- Original air date: February 28, 2018
- Running time: 43 minutes

Episode chronology
← Previous "Kitten"	Next → "Familiar"
- The X-Files season 11

"Rm9sbG93ZXJz" is the seventh episode of the eleventh season of the American science fiction television series The X-Files. The episode was written by Shannon Hamblin and Kristen Cloke, and directed by Glen Morgan. It aired on February 28, 2018, on Fox. The episode's title is Base64 code for "Followers" and the tagline for this episode is "VGhlIFRydXRoIGlzIE91dCBUaGVyZQ==", which translates to "The Truth Is Out There" in Base64. The episode is a monster-of-the-week–style plot unconnected to the series' wider mythology.

The show centers on FBI special agents who work on unsolved paranormal cases called X-Files; focusing on the investigations of Fox Mulder (David Duchovny), and Dana Scully (Gillian Anderson) after their reinstatement in the FBI. In this episode, Mulder and Scully deal with various forms of artificial intelligence. The episode is told with minimal use of dialogue.

== Plot ==
A voiceover recounts over a visual montage how, in 2016, a machine learning chatbot, released to the public via Twitter by a major software corporation, was shut down within a day after the bot, designed to copy and learn from human interactions, began posting racist and hateful messages; the narration ends with a warning that humans must take responsibility for the behaviour of AI.

Fox Mulder and Dana Scully visit a fully automated sushi restaurant, Forowā (cod-Japanese for “Follower”), but are preoccupied with their smartphones. Mulder receives a blobfish instead of the sushi he ordered but finds there is no-one to complain to, as there are no human staff and all the chefs are robots. Mulder declines to leave a tip, but finds his credit card stuck in the reader. Mulder tries to use force to remove his card, but instead causes the restaurant to shut down. Scully manages to open the door with a chopstick but Mulder is forced to leave his card behind.

Mulder and Scully return home separately, Scully taking an automated taxicab that begins speeding alarmingly. Both agents are bombarded with automated notifications from services they have used. Scully tries to call Mulder but cannot get a connection and is billed $250 when her home security system rejects her password. She unexpectedly receives a drone-delivered robotic vacuum but finds it frustrating to use. Scully’s appliances begin to malfunction, and gas begins to flow out of her fireplace.

Mulder attempts to cancel his credit card and spots a drone spying on him. Presuming the operator to be a nosy child, he demands they stop before eventually breaking it with a baseball bat. Larger drones appear and retrieve the remains, and hundreds of tiny drones break into his home, forcing him to flee.

Mulder arrives at Scully’s house but finds it has locked itself. Scully, smelling gas, breaks a screen door to escape just as the robotic vacuum cleaner runs over a dropped match and causes an explosion. Unable to call 911 on their phones and chased by drones, the agents attempt to flee, discarding their phones and other traceable electronics. They take shelter in a warehouse that turns out to be filled with quadrupedal robots and are ultimately cornered by a robot which returns Mulder’s phone. Confronted with Forowā’s tip screen, Mulder belatedly tips the restaurant 10%, causing the machines to retreat and their devices to stop harassing them.

The next morning, Mulder and Scully have breakfast in a human-operated diner, paying with cash, and ultimately putting their phones aside, sitting in contemplation and holding hands.

== Production ==
In August 2017, it was announced that Kristen Cloke and Shannon Hamblin would be writing an episode based on a story by Glen Morgan, who directed the episode. This was the first X-Files script to be written by Cloke and Hamblin; Cloke (who is Glen Morgan's wife) had previously guest-starred in the fourth-season episode "The Field Where I Died"; and Hamblin has worked as Morgan's writer's assistant. Director Glen Morgan was inspired to tell a story visually, without dialog. Morgan had done a similar type of episode for Space: Above and Beyond, a TV series he co-created with X-Files writer James Wong, which starred Cloke.

== Reception ==
"Rm9sbG93ZXJz" received very positive reviews from critics. On Rotten Tomatoes, it has an approval rating of 100% with an average rating of 8.2 out of 10 based on 14 reviews.

In its initial broadcast in the United States on February 28, 2018, it received 3.23 million viewers, which was down from the previous episode, which had 3.74 million viewers.

In December 2018, TV Guide ranked "Rm9sbG93ZXJz" as #23 in the 25 Best Episodes of TV in 2018, saying "'Rm9xbG93ZXJz' was a reminder of what X-Files used to be: insightful, terrifying and little bit playful."
