= Sanguinarium =

- The X-Files episode
- A doctor is shocked to discover he has mutilated the face of a patient with acid. Many critics were critical of the gore featured in the episode.
- Episode no.: Season 4 Episode 6
- Directed by: Kim Manners
- Written by: Vivian Mayhew; Valerie Mayhew
- Production code: 4X06
- Original air date: November 10, 1996
- Running time: 44 minutes

Guest appearances
- O-Lan Jones as Nurse Rebecca Waite; Nancy J. Lilley as Liposuction Patient; John Juliani as Dr. Harrison Lloyd; Andrew Airlie as Attorney; Celine Lockhart as Skin Peel Patient; Arlene Mazerolle as Dr. Theresa Shannon; Richard Beymer as Dr. Jack Franklin; Paul Raskin as Dr. Eric Ilaqua; Gregory Thirloway as Dr. Mitchell Kaplan; Nina Roman as Jill Holwagerm; Martin Evans as Dr. Hartman; Marie Stillin as Dr. Sally Sanford

Episode chronology
← Previous "The Field Where I Died"	Next → "Musings of a Cigarette Smoking Man"
- The X-Files season 4

"Sanguinarium" is the sixth episode of the fourth season of the American science fiction television series The X-Files. "Sanguinarium" was written by newcomers Vivian and Valerie Mayhew and directed by Kim Manners, and is a "Monster-of-the-Week" story, a stand-alone plot which is unconnected to the series' wider mythology. It first aired in the United States on November 10, 1996 on the Fox network, earning a Nielsen rating of 11.1 and being seen by 19.85 million viewers upon its initial broadcast.

The show centers on FBI special agents Fox Mulder (David Duchovny) and Dana Scully (Gillian Anderson) who work on cases linked to the paranormal, called X-Files. In "Sanguinarium", bizarre murders in a hospital's plastic surgery unit lead Mulder and Scully to suspect a supernatural force may be responsible. As the uncontrolled killings continue, Mulder discovers a link between the victims' dates of birth and key dates on the witchcraft calendar.

The episode started as a spec script written by two fans of the series. It features several references to real life witchcraft sources. "Sanguinarium" received mixed reviews from critics; negative criticism was given to the number of inconsistencies in the plot. The episode's use of gore also drew a mixed reaction; some critics felt that the gore helped, while others felt that "Sanguinarium" relied too heavily on it to cover up weaknesses in its storyline.

== Plot ==
During a routine liposuction operation in Winnetka, Illinois, Dr. Harrison Lloyd (John Juliani) suddenly begins to remove so much fat that his patient dies. Lloyd later tells Fox Mulder (David Duchovny) that he killed the patient because he was possessed; Dana Scully (Gillian Anderson) is skeptical, believing he is only making it up to escape legal consequences.

Mulder inspects the operation room and discovers a pentagram burned into the floor; he begins to suspect that witchcraft might have played a part in the crime. Meanwhile, staff at the clinic are shocked when another plastic surgeon, Dr. Ilaqua (Paul Raskin), kills an elderly patient by burning a hole through her cheek and neck with a surgical laser, severing her brain stem. Scully interviews Ilaqua, who claims that he cannot remember anything of the incident. Mulder's suspicions are strengthened when he reviews the tape of the second murder and sees a pentagram-like pattern on the stomach of the victim.

Worried by the events, the clinic's coordinator, Dr. Theresa Shannon, tells Mulder and Scully about a similar series of deaths that occurred there ten years prior. They suspect Rebecca Waite (O-Lan Jones), a nurse who is the only person present at all the death scenes. The agents visit Rebecca's house, discovering evidence that she practices witchcraft; however, the evidence was planted there by a staff member of the hospital. Elsewhere, Dr. Jack Franklin (Richard Beymer) is non-fatally assaulted by Rebecca at his house. There, Rebecca is arrested by the agents, who attempt to question her but are prevented when she starts to vomit pins, dying shortly thereafter.

After the incident, Mulder visits Franklin, hoping to learn more about Rebecca's possible motivation. Although Franklin is seemingly innocent, when Mulder leaves the room, he begins to levitate and devilishly smile. Later that night, Mulder deduces that the birthdays of all the victims match up with the dates of the Witches' Sabbath and that Rebecca was actually trying to protect the victims from Franklin, using the pentagrams as protective symbols. Unfortunately, Mulder also realizes that because Rebecca was not the murderer, the spree of murders will continue. As he's suspected, another patient is murdered with acid at the clinic.

Soon after, the agents again meet with Shannon, who divulges that five people died during the previous killing spree: four patients and a cosmetic doctor named Clifford Cox, who ostensibly died of a drug overdose. Although his birthday does not align with a Sabbath date, Mulder instinctively believes that Cox is involved in the crimes. He uses the clinic's computer program to determine what Cox would look like had he undergone heavy plastic surgery. The computer produces an image that looks like Franklin, suggesting that he is actually Cox in disguise.

When Shannon discovers Franklin alone in a blood-spattered operating room, he uses witchcraft to magically teleport surgical tools into her intestines, which causes her to bleed internally. She is rushed into surgery and survives. Meanwhile, Franklin removes the skin of his face, performs a ritual to make him appear younger and escapes while a patient (listed with a birthdate of October 31) nearby is found with their face gone. It is implied that he murders in a quest to gain eternal youth. The episode ends with a now-younger Franklin successfully applying for a position at another hospital.

== Production ==
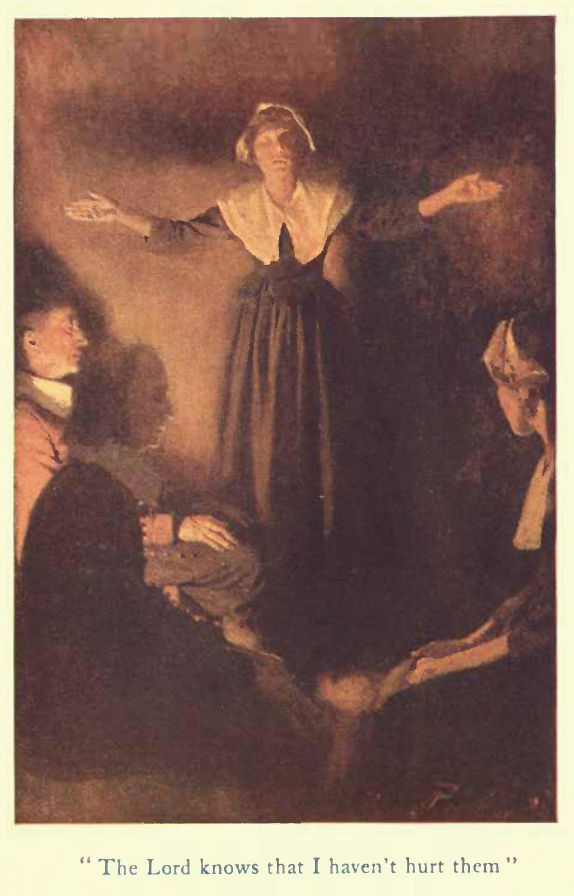
The nurse in the episode was named after Rebecca Nurse, a woman executed for witchcraft during the Salem witch trials.

In the 1990s, the television industry made wide use of spec scripts, solicited from freelance writers. While The X-Files had a large staff of writers, the staff would occasionally have to take a risk on a teleplay written by an unaffiliated writer to fill out a full season order. "Sanguinarium" was such a case, being written by sisters Vivian and Valerie Mayhew. This marked their first experience with writing a one-hour network program, and they would later write several episodes in the television series Charmed. Prior to having their script picked up by the series, the sisters asked staff writers Glen Morgan and James Wong for writing suggestions. Morgan and Wong told them that "the scariest things are those which repeat every day". Soon thereafter, Vivian was paged by a number she did not recognize. She realized that pagers in their own way are scary, because an unknown person can connect to the pager's owner. The Mayhews then went from focusing on pagers to the group of people who normally use them: doctors. It was then that they realized a plot about doctors losing control and being bewitched could make for a good episode. After writing their spec script, they presented it to Morgan and Wong, who suggested they change the villain from a woman to a man as "plastic surgery is related to vanity, and everyone expects that from a woman, but not a man." After the script was submitted, it was selected to become a full episode.

After the spec script was picked up, series creator Chris Carter and the show's staff reworked it into a teleplay. Carter focused much of the plot on the themes of greed and vanity, and executive producer Howard Gordon developed several graphic scenes. After Carter had the idea of placing a subtle pentagram on the reunion table, production designer Graeme Murray decided to take this further by creating rooms with five sides, and having the plastic surgery unit with five operating rooms represent an imaginary pentagram. Like previous episode "Home", Fox Standards and Practices objected to the graphical content, and Carter had to intervene to help retain some scenes.

The nurse from the episode, Rebecca Waite, was originally named after a friend of the writers called Rebecca White. However, this was changed because there was a real nurse from Chicago whose last name was White. Some viewers ended up believing that Waite's name as a reference to either Rebecca Nurse, an innocent woman prosecuted during the Salem witch trials, or the Rider–Waite tarot deck, the most popular tarot deck utilized in the world. The episode itself directly references Gerald Gardner, a wiccan known for publishing several books on witchcraft and founder of the Gardnerian Tradition. While the Mayhew sisters tried to depict occultism without offending anybody by not connecting Franklin or Waite to any known cult, many Wiccans sent angry letters and e-mails to Fox regarding the portrayal of their beliefs.

== Broadcast and reception ==
"Sanguinarium" premiered on the Fox network on November 10, 1996. This episode earned a Nielsen rating of 11.1, with an 18 share, meaning that roughly 11.1 percent of all television-equipped households, and 18 percent of households watching television, were tuned in to the episode. "Sanguinarium" was seen by 18.85 million viewers on first broadcast.

Gillian Anderson described "Sanguinarium" as "one of the most repulsive scripts I ever shot", explaining that she could not watch scenes such as the doctor stabbing a patient. David Duchovny stated that "I didn't understand the plot, but I liked the script", noting that Carter and his team improved a weak teleplay and that director Kim Manners "did an excellent job". Entertainment Weekly gave "Sanguinarium" a "B−", feeling that it was "redeemed" by the gore. However, they were "worried" by what they called the "fourth consecutive phoned-in performance by Duchovny and Anderson". Emily VanDerWerff of The A.V. Club was more negative, grading it a "D". She felt that the episode was "too much", and that the gore should have been suggested rather than shown directly. She also criticized the characterization of the characters (especially that of Scully), the "predictable" scares, the "ludicrously bad" dialogue, and a story that did not make much sense. Despite this, she did praise the "strong" guest acting.

Frederick S. Clarke from Cinefantastique gave "Sanguinarium" a mixed review, writing that the episode "combines plastic surgery and black magic into an unsatisfying mix that fails to lampoon our obsession with beauty." Not all reviews were as negative. Writer Preston Nichols took a liking to the episode, having viewed it "eighteen times and counting". Michael Avalos and George Liedtke, writing for Knight Ridder, speculated that "Sanguinarium" would create "haunting memories" for many viewers. Mark Davis of The Daytona Beach News-Journal, in 1998, named the episode one of the "Best of The X-Files".

== Bibliography ==
- Delasara, Jan (2000). X-Files Confidential. PopLit, PopCult and The X-Files: A Critical Exploration.
- Genge, Ngaire (2000). The Book of Shadows: The Unofficial Charmed Companion. Three Rivers Press – Random House. ISBN 9780609806524.
- Heselton, Philip (2012). Witchfather: A Life of Gerald Gardner. Vol 1: Into the Witch Cult. Thoth Publications.
- Hornsby, Jason S. (2007). Every Sigh, the End: A Novel About Zombies. Permuted Press.
- Meisler, Andy (1998). I Want to Believe: The Official Guide to the X-Files Volume 3. Harper Prism. ISBN 9780061053863.
