= Owls (Millennium) =

- Millennium episode
- Episode no.: Season 2 Episode 15
- Directed by: Thomas J. Wright
- Written by: Glen Morgan; James Wong
- Production code: 5C14
- Original air date: March 6, 1998

Guest appearances
- Kristen Cloke as Lara Means; Kimberly Patton as Clear Knight; R.G. Armstrong as The Old Man; Malcolm Stewart as Mr. Johnston

Episode chronology
← Previous "The Pest House"	Next → "Roosters"
- Millennium season 2

"Owls" is the fifteenth episode of the second season of the American crime-thriller television series Millennium. It originally aired on the Fox network on March 6, 1998. The episode was written by Glen Morgan and James Wong, and directed by Thomas J. Wright. "Owls" featured guest appearances by Kristen Cloke, R. G. Armstrong and Kimberly Patton.

Millennium Group offender profilers Frank Black (Lance Henriksen) and Peter Watts (Terry O'Quinn) become embroiled in a growing schism within the Group, prompted by the discovery of the True Cross. "Owls" is a two-part episode, with the story continued in "Roosters".

"Owls" was inspired by the earlier second season episode "The Hand of St. Sebastian", with Morgan wishing to introduce secular beliefs within the Millennium Group. The episode has received positive responses from critics, and was viewed by approximately 5.5 percent of the available audience in its initial broadcast.

== Plot ==
In Damascus, a team of men excavate a piece of petrified wood—the True Cross—but are interrupted by the arrival of two armed assailants; one of the excavators, Le Fur, clutches the wood as a shield, and the attackers' guns jam when they attempt to fire on him. However, when Le Fur attempts to smuggle the wood out of the country, he is killed by a bomb at the airport. The Cross is taken by a man named Helmut Gunsche, who later calls his employer, Rudolf Axmann, to inform him of the theft; Axmann's cufflinks bear a Germanic rune.

In Seattle, Catherine Black (Megan Gallagher) meets Clear Knight (Kimberly Patton), an executive at Aerotech International. Knight offers Catherine a position as a counselor for the fledgling company, which she accepts. Elsewhere, Millennium Group investigator Peter Watts (Terry O'Quinn) meets several other Group members to discuss the competing factions within the Group—the Roosters believe that the coming millennium will trigger a biblical apocalypse, while the Owls believe the end of the world will be a secular, material disaster. The discovery and theft of the True Cross threatens to tip the internecine conflict in the favor of the Owls, leaving them in control of the Group; the assembled members are Roosters and wish to stop this.

Meanwhile, Lara Means (Kristen Cloke), another Group member, sees a vision of an angel. She begins researching her visions, and is scouted by a Mr. Johnston, who asks her to work with the Owl faction. Meanwhile, Catherine's husband Frank (Lance Henriksen) returns home to find Watts in his house. Watts explains that Black's modem has been bugged; the two argue heatedly and Black declares he is done with the Group. Watts and Means discuss the theft of the Cross; Watts explains that it is fabled to grant its possessor invulnerability, and that the Nazis had attempted to find it to turn the tide of World War II. Means believes that the Owls would not have stolen it, as they would not wish to risk sparking a civil war within the Group. Meanwhile, Catherine leaves work at Aerotech one evening and finds that her car will not start. She is met by Knight, who invites the Black family to her home; it is seen that she wears the same Germanic rune cufflinks as Axmann.

Johnston is driving along a quiet road when Gunsche forces his car off the road. Gunsche strangles Johnston to death and places a piece of wood—meant to resemble the Cross—inside his car before setting both ablaze. The remains are later examined by Watts and Means; they cannot determine if the wood is the Cross or not. However, Watts finds Johnston's partially burnt diary and reads an entry about his contacting Means. Suspecting betrayal, he expels Means from the Group. Meanwhile, Black realizes that a painting he has seen in Knight's office was a watercolor by Adolf Hitler. He then notices two men staking out his house. Black approaches and holds them at gunpoint, and they identify themselves as Group members; however, one of them discreetly draws his own pistol.

== Production ==
"Owls" was written by frequent collaborators Glen Morgan and James Wong. It was the twelfth episode to have been written by the pair, who had penned several across the first and second seasons of the series. The pair had also taken the roles of co-executive producers for the season. "Owls" was directed by Thomas J. Wright; Wright had directed eleven episodes previously and would helm a further fourteen over the series' run. Wright would also go on to direct "Millennium", the series' crossover episode with its sister show The X-Files.

Morgan has noted that the plot for "Owls", and the concluding two-part episode "Roosters", grew out of the internecine conflict seen within the Millennium Group in "The Hand of St. Sebastian", an earlier second season episode he had penned with Wong. Morgan had wanted to introduce secular elements to the series' focus on eschatology, after the theological focus of the earlier episode; he began focussing on ideas such as biological warfare as a possible way of depicting the end of the world—an idea which would later play out in the two-part episodes concluding the second season, "The Time Is Now" and "The Fourth Horseman".

Guest star Kimberly Patton had worked with Morgan and Wong on several occasions prior to this episode, appearing in "Blood", an episode of The X-Files they had written, as well as acting in Space: Above and Beyond, the pair's short-lived science fiction series.

== Broadcast and reception ==
"Owls" was first broadcast on the Fox network on March 6, 1998. The episode earned a Nielsen rating of 5.5 during its original broadcast, meaning that 5.5 percent of households in the United States viewed the episode. This represented approximately 5.39 million households, and left the episode the seventy-ninth most-viewed broadcast that week. (Note: Each ratings point represented 980,000 households during the 1997–98 television season.)

The A.V. Club's Emily VanDerWerff rated the episode an "A", finding it "exhilarating" despite its seemingly nonsensical plot. However, VanDerWerff felt that the episode moved at a constant and entertaining pace, and that it and "Roosters" never felt stretched out longer than they should have been. Bill Gibron, writing for DVD Talk, rated the episode 5 out of 5, writing that it "poses amazing questions while precisely and purposefully offering up the answers". Gibron felt that the episode was a perfect summation of the themes which had been hinted at in the earlier episode "Beware of the Dog", and would set the tone for the season. Robert Shearman and Lars Pearson, in their book Wanting to Believe: A Critical Guide to The X-Files, Millennium & The Lone Gunmen, rated "Owls" three-and-a-half stars out of five. Shearman felt the episode was entertaining and fun, but that its plot was confusing and cluttered. However, he felt that the episode served as a better version of "The Hand of St. Sebastian", with the slower pace of a two-part episode allowing for greater "gravitas" to be given to the storyline.

== Footnotes ==
=== References ===
- Shearman, Robert; Pearson, Lars (2009). Wanting to Believe: A Critical Guide to The X-Files, Millennium & The Lone Gunmen. Mad Norwegian Press. ISBN 978-0975944691.
