= The Pest House =

- Millennium episode
- Episode no.: Season 2 Episode 14
- Directed by: Allen Coulter
- Written by: Glen Morgan; James Wong
- Production code: 5C15
- Original air date: February 27, 1998

Guest appearances
- Melinda McGraw as Dr. Stoller; Justin Louis as Edward; Michael Massee as Purdue; Darcy Laurie as E. Jacob Woodcock

Episode chronology
← Previous "The Mikado"	Next → "Owls"
- Millennium season 2

"The Pest House" is the fourteenth episode of the second season of the American crime-thriller television series Millennium. It premiered on the Fox network on February 27, 1998. The episode was written by Glen Morgan and James Wong, and directed by Allen Coulter. "The Pest House" featured guest appearances by Melinda McGraw, Justin Louis and Michael Massee.

Millennium Group offender profilers Frank Black (Lance Henriksen) and Peter Watts (Terry O'Quinn) investigate a series of murders mimicking urban legends. The case soon leads them to a psychiatric hospital for violent criminals, where all is not as it seems.

"The Pest House" marked the second of three contributions by Coulter, and saw past Morgan and Wong collaborator McGraw once again work for the writing duo. The episode received positive reviews from critics, and was viewed by approximately 5.59 million households in its initial broadcast.

== Plot ==
A young couple sit in a car, sharing a story of a serial killer from the area. They hear sounds outside, and the boyfriend steps out to see what they are. His girlfriend is terrified when she hears sounds of a struggle, and investigates to find him dangling above the car, dead.

Millennium Group investigators Frank Black (Lance Henriksen) and Peter Watts (Terry O'Quinn) examine the crime scene. Black is skeptical when Watts notes that similar killings have occurred in the past, believing it is simply an urban legend. However, an inmate at a nearby psychiatric hospital was committed for similar murders. Unconvinced that he could have escaped, the pair nevertheless visit the facility. They meet Dr. Ellen Stoller (Melinda McGraw), who reluctantly assists them in interviewing their suspect, E. Jacob Woodcock. Woodcock admits the killing fits his methods but denies involvement. The interview is terminated when two inmates begin fighting.

That night, another couple is brutally killed on a highway. Black and Watts investigate but deem the deaths unconnected. However, Black notices that the murders are identical to the prior crimes of "Bear" (C. Ernst Harth), one of the inmates involved in the previous day's fight. Stoller is adamant Bear cannot be responsible—until she finds the victim's hand in the cafeteria's stew. Bear insists someone took something "from inside" him but has a seizure before he can explain. Between this incident and Woodcock insisting that Edward (Justin Louis) has stolen his dreams, Black realizes someone in the hospital is causing the deaths.

After seeing a vision of Stoller being stabbed in her car, Black warns her that she may be in danger, which she rebukes. However, she is approached by another patient, Purdue (Michael Massee), who insists that Edward is stealing dreams but will not steal his. Watts researches the facility's inmates to find who has committed stabbings in the victims' cars, concluding that Purdue is the one this profile fits. Black attempts to warn Stoller, but she has already driven away from the hospital. Black gives chase, scaring her, and she out-paces him before pulling into a filling station. However, the attendant alerts Stoller that someone is hiding in the back seat of her car and manages to bring her to the safety of his office. Black arrives and finds the car empty. He drives Stoller back to the hospital while the attendant attempts to call the police. However, he is killed before making the call.

Black searches for Purdue in the hospital but encounters Edward, who tells him a nurse was murdered years before by Woodcock. Edward believes the patients can be cured by having the evil drained from their bodies. The electricity is cut and the lights go off. Black and Stoller roam in the dark, finding the body of the night nurse. Purdue's voice is heard over the intercom, and the pair move to the office with the tannoy equipment to find him. Edward attacks with a knife—Stoller sees him shape-shift into Purdue, then Bear, and then Woodcock. However, Purdue fights and kills him, proclaiming it "the sanest thing I ever did." Black theorizes that Edward somehow absorbed the killers' violent impulses into himself but was unable to refrain from acting upon them.

== Production ==
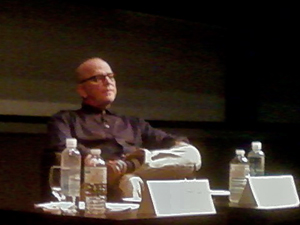
"The Pest House" was the second episode directed by Allen Coulter.

"The Pest House" was written by frequent collaborators Glen Morgan and James Wong, and directed by Allen Coulter. The episode was Coulter's second contribution to the series—he had previously directed "Beware of the Dog" and would return to helm "Siren" later in the second season. "The Pest House" was the eleventh episode to have been written by Morgan and Wong, who had penned several across the first and second seasons. The pair had also taken the roles of co-executive producers for the season.

Guest star Melinda McGraw had appeared in several episodes of Millennium's sister show The X-Files, in a recurring role as Melissa Scully, debuting in an episode of that series also penned by Morgan and Wong. McGraw had also worked with the writers on The Commish.

== Broadcast and reception ==
"The Pest House" was first broadcast on the Fox network on February 27, 1998. The episode earned a Nielsen rating of 5.7 during its original broadcast, meaning that 5.7 percent of households in the United States viewed the episode. This represented approximately 5.59 million households, and left the episode the seventy-fifth most-viewed broadcast that week. (Note: Each ratings point represented 980,000 households during the 1997–98 television season.)

The episode received positive reviews from critics. The A.V. Club's Zack Handlen rated the episode an A−, finding it "is, like many episodes of this season before it, a bit of mess, a melange of concepts which don't always taste so great together". Handlen felt that the episode began with an "iffy" premise which more closely resembled an episode of The X-Files, but by its end had managed to make it something more distinct and separate. Bill Gibron, writing for DVD Talk, rated the episode 3.5 out of 5, writing that it was "an episode that pays lip service to the Group's interest in this case to merely go back to the same old "killer of the week" conceit". However, Gibron felt that "the acting is wonderful, and the actual story very moody and atmospheric". Robert Shearman and Lars Pearson, in their book Wanting to Believe: A Critical Guide to The X-Files, Millennium & The Lone Gunmen, rated "The Pest House" three-and-a-half stars out of five. Shearman praised guest star Massee's performance, and felt that the script was "great fun", noting that it worked as a more serious version of the 1996 film Scream.

== Footnotes ==
=== References ===
- Lovece, Frank (1996). The X-Files Declassified. Citadel Press. ISBN 0-8065-1745-X.
- Shearman, Robert; Pearson, Lars (2009). Wanting to Believe: A Critical Guide to The X-Files, Millennium & The Lone Gunmen. Mad Norwegian Press. ISBN 978-0975944691.
