= Sense and Antisense (Millennium) =

- Millennium episode
- Episode no.: Season 2 Episode 3
- Directed by: Thomas J. Wright
- Written by: Chip Johannessen
- Production code: 5C03
- Original air date: October 3, 1997
- Running time: 43 minutes

Guest appearances
- Ricky Harris as Gerome Knox; Allan Zinyk as Brian Roedecker; Badja Djola as Lacuna; Clarence Williams III as Zero/Kramer

Episode chronology
| ← Previous "Beware of the Dog" | Next → "Monster" |
- Millennium season 2

"'Sense and Antisense" is the third episode of the second season of the crime-thriller television series Millennium. It premiered on the Fox network in the United States on October 3, 1997. The episode was written by Chip Johannessen and directed by Thomas J. Wright. "Sense and Antisense" featured guest appearances from Clarence Williams III and Ricky Harris.

Millennium centers on offender profiler Frank Black (Lance Henriksen), who investigates unusual crimes as part of the private investigative organisation the Millennium Group. In this episode, Black aids in the search for a man who is supposedly carrying a highly contagious virus and discovers the secret behind the Human Genome Project.

Johannessen has described "Sense and Antisense" as having suffered from extensive script re-writes; his original version dealt more strongly with racial issues but was rewritten at the behest of the network's broadcast standards office. The episode earned a mixed reception from television critics, and was viewed by approximately 6.57 million households upon its initial broadcast.

== Plot ==
Patient Zero (Clarence Williams III) tries to hail a taxi on a busy street but is continually ignored. He is eventually picked up by Gerome Knox (Ricky Harris) but suffers a seizure in the backseat, raving about a threat against his life. Knox takes him to hospital, where he is diagnosed as a drug addict. Zero is sedated but becomes agitated when two men enter the hospital lobby; Knox helps him escape, believing his life is in danger. The two men, Wright and Patterson, quarantine the area, as Zero is carrying a highly contagious disease.

Millennium Group consultant Frank Black (Lance Henriksen) attends a briefing on the situation, where it is explained that Zero is carrying an exotic disease ordinarily confined to the Congo. Meanwhile, Zero and Knox are attempting to have a local newspaper run Zero's story, believing he has been infected in a racially motivated conspiracy akin to the Tuskegee syphilis experiment. Police locate and apprehend Zero, who manages to smear blood on Black's shirt.

Black has the blood tested, and finds it free of any pathogen; meanwhile, the government facility running the earlier briefing has vanished. Black realizes he was tricked into finding Zero for an ulterior motive, eventually learning that the organization responsible is carrying out medical experiments on the homeless and may be tied to the Millennium Group. Elsewhere a homeless man, acting similarly to Zero, attacks two policemen and is killed in response. Black and fellow Group member Peter Watts (Terry O'Quinn) investigate but are clearly not welcome. Black manages to obtain a blood sample from the dead man and finds a stretcher tag he believes is connected to the Department of Energy.

Further examination of the blood of both Zero and the dead man reveal that their condition has been induced through gene therapy. Watts and Black theorize that the Department of Energy is developing a biological weapon which would incite violence and rioting in a targeted population; they learn that the research is being conducted by scientists involved in the Human Genome Project. Later, Knox's body is found at a nearby morgue.

Assisted by local police, Black and Watts raid an office building connected to the project, which they believe is using homeless shelters to test the pathogen. They hope to recover Zero, but find him cogent and working for the project—his real name is Dr. William Kramer, and he denies any knowledge of the incident. Black believes Kramer was accidentally infected and finds a photograph in his office, showing him in military uniform, taking part in the 1994 Rwandan genocide.

== Production ==
"Sense and Antisense" was written by Chip Johannessen, who went on to write a total of twelve episodes across all three seasons, including the series' final episode, "Goodbye to All That". The episode was directed by Thomas J. Wright; Wright had directed six episodes previously and would helm a further nineteen over the series' run. Wright would also go on to direct "Millennium", the series' crossover episode with its sister show The X-Files.

Johannessen was ultimately unhappy with how the episode turned out, believing that it suffered as a result of frequent re-writes to the script. Johannessen's original draft focused more heavily on racial issues, which Fox's broadcast standards office objected to. The episode makes use of Bobby Darin's song "Gyp the Cat" in a diegetic manner. Darin's music has been noted by Millennium's resident composer Mark Snow as a hallmark of the works of executive producers Glen Morgan and James Wong, and would also appear in the episodes "Beware of the Dog", "Monster", and "Goodbye Charlie".

== Broadcast and reception ==
"Sense and Antisense" was first broadcast on the Fox network in the United States on October 3, 1997. The episode earned a Nielsen rating of 6.7 during its original broadcast, meaning that 6.7 percent of households in the United States viewed the episode. This represented approximately 6.59 million households, and left the episode the seventy-second most-viewed broadcast that week. (Note: Each ratings point represented 980,000 households during the 1997–98 television season.)

The episode generally received mixed reviews from critics. The A.V. Club's Emily VanDerWerff rated the episode a C+, finding that it to be ambitious but ultimately feeling that it attempted too much at once. VanDerWerff found the episode "entertaining", but added that it "feels like something that’s been rewritten at least one time too many, to incorporate more and more ideas until the center cannot hold". Bill Gibron, writing for DVD Talk, rated the episode 4 out of 5, praising Williams' guest appearance. Gibron also felt positively about the episode's complexity, feeling that it displayed "a certain intelligence" in assuming such a pace. Robert Shearman and Lars Pearson, in their book Wanting to Believe: A Critical Guide to The X-Files, Millennium & The Lone Gunmen, rated "Sense and Antisense" two stars out of five, describing it as "too thin and too obvious". Shearman praised Williams' guest appearance, but felt that the episode seemed too close thematically to The X-Files to work well on its own.
