= The Beginning and the End (Millennium) =

- Millennium episode
- Episode no.: Season 2 Episode 1
- Directed by: Thomas J. Wright
- Written by: Glen Morgan; James Wong
- Production code: 5C01
- Original air date: September 19, 1997

Guest appearances
- Doug Hutchison as Polaroid Man; Allan Zinyk as Brian Roedecker; Norman Armour as Suited Man; Mitchell Kosterman as Sheriff; Judith Maxie as Finley; Drew Reichelt as Dicky Bird Perkins; Alan Robertson as Elderly Man

Episode chronology
← Previous "Paper Dove"	Next → "Beware of the Dog"
- Millennium season 2

"'The Beginning and the End" is the first episode of the second season of the American crime-thriller television series Millennium. It premiered on the Fox network on September 19, 1997. The episode was written by Glen Morgan and James Wong, and directed by Thomas J. Wright. "The Beginning and the End" featured a guest appearance by Doug Hutchison as the Polaroid Man.

In this episode, Millennium Group profiler Frank Black (Lance Henriksen) must track down the man who has kidnapped his wife Catherine (Megan Gallagher). During his hunt, Group member Peter Watts (Terry O'Quinn) reveals that the Group is much more secretive and mysterious than Black had ever known.

"The Beginning and the End" marks the first episode produced with Morgan and Wong as co-executive producers; their tenure in charge of the series would last the entirety of the second season. Guest star Hutchison was a frequent collaborator with the writers, having worked together in several other series. The episode was seen by approximately 7.15 million households in its original broadcast, and has received mixed to positive reviews from television critics.

== Plot ==
The episode begins in medias res from the ending of the preceding episode, showing Millennium Group consultant Frank Black (Lance Henriksen) returning by plane to Seattle with his wife Catherine (Megan Gallagher) and daughter Jordan (Brittany Tiplady). As Black takes Jordan to their car, Catherine is drugged and kidnapped by a strange man (Doug Hutchison). The abductor—the Polaroid Man—hides Catherine in his car and escapes with her to the mountains overlooking the city.

Black's fellow Group members arrive to help, even though he had not yet contacted any of them. The Group sets up roadblocks throughout Seattle but are unsuccessful in finding Catherine. Black returns home, where his colleague Peter Watts (Terry O'Quinn) tells him about trying to conceive a son with his wife. Watts recounts having been assigned to a child murder case in which the dismembered infant's body had been found in a cooler; he believed that God would reward him with his longed-for son if he could find the killer—years later, he still only has his three daughters, which has caused him to realize you must sacrifice one thing to gain another. Watts then has a Group member install software on Black's computer, allowing him access to sensitive documents—Black comments that he thought he already had full access before. Watts also explains that the Group's interest in Black is the reason for the Polaroid Man's actions. Elsewhere, the Polaroid Man ties up Catherine in a dark room.

Black struggles to find anything useful while investigating Catherine's abduction. However, he begins to experience seemingly psychic visions which lead him to believe she is being held in their former home. The police raid the address but find it empty; Black finds a Polaroid of another house inside. He is able to track down the address of this house but goes alone. There, he finds Catherine in the basement, bound to a rafter. He goes to untie her but is blinded by a camera flash. He struggles with the Polaroid Man, which we see through a series of photographs taken by the man's camera. Black is able to wrest the Polaroid Man's knife away from him and stab him to death. Returning home, Catherine packs a suitcase for Black, telling him that she cannot have him in their home for the time being, believing that he sacrificed a part of himself in killing her attacker. She hopes that time apart might help him recover what he is missing inside; he takes the suitcase and drives off.

== Production ==
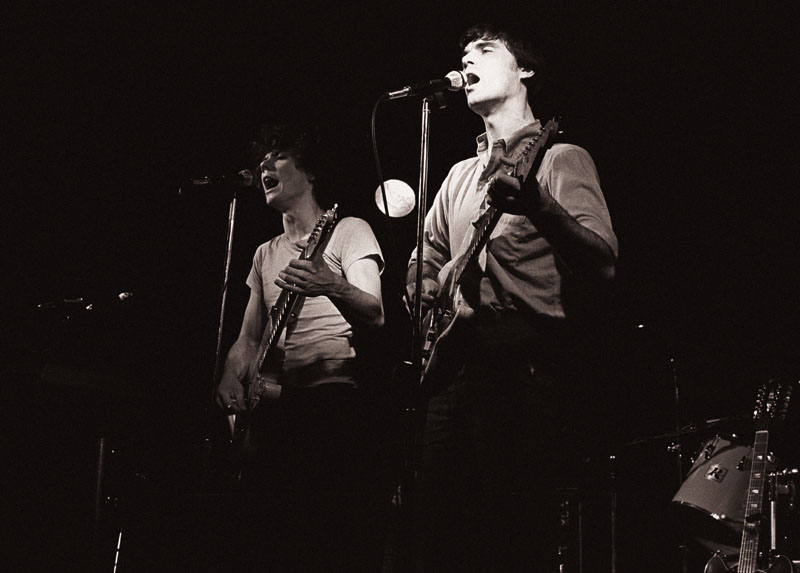
"The Beginning and the End" features the song "Life During Wartime" by Talking Heads (pictured 1978).

"The Beginning and the End" was written by frequent collaborators Glen Morgan and James Wong, and directed by Thomas J. Wright. Wright had previously directed five episodes of the first season—"Dead Letters", "The Wild and the Innocent", "The Thin White Line", "Powers, Principalities, Thrones and Dominions" and "Paper Dove"—and would go on to direct a further twenty episodes over the series' run. Wright would also go on to direct "Millennium", the series' crossover episode with its sister show The X-Files. The episode was the fourth to have been written by Morgan and Wong, after "Dead Letters", "522666" and "The Thin White Line" in the first season. The duo would go on to pen a further eleven episodes over the course of the second season, having taken the roles of co-executive producers for the season.

Doug Hutchison's character, credited here as "Polaroid Man", had previously appeared in the first season finale "Paper Dove". In that episode the character was credited as "The Figure", and been portrayed by Paul Raskin. The character had been a presence in the series since "Pilot", but had often merely been alluded to without being seen. Hutchison had worked with Morgan and Wong several times before; they had first met during production of "Squeeze", an episode of Millennium's sister show The X-Files, and again on Morgan and Wong's short-lived series Space: Above and Beyond.

Discussing plans for the season, Morgan noted that "the Millennium Group is a much deeper organization" than seen in the first season, adding that "they're considering [Frank Black] for a candidate for the group (and) trying to show him that at the millennium there's going to be an event - either fire and brimstone or harmonic convergence". Wong spoke about how the character of Catherine Black, saying "there's a different relationship between Frank and his family this season because of the separation ... I think that will not only bring some kind of heartfelt drama but humor into it". The episode makes use of the Talking Heads song "Life During Wartime", taken from their 1979 album Fear of Music.

== Broadcast and reception ==
"The Beginning and the End" was first broadcast on the Fox network on September 19, 1997. The episode earned a Nielsen rating of 7.3 during its original broadcast, meaning that 7.3 percent of households in the United States viewed the episode. This represented approximately 7.15 million households, and left the episode the fifty-third most-viewed broadcast that week. (Note: Each ratings point represented 980,000 households during the 1997–1998 television season.)

The episode received mixed to positive reviews from critics. Writing for The Buffalo News, Alan Pergament rated the episode three stars out of five, describing it as "moody" but "muddled and confusing". Pergament noted that "the suspense of the premiere actually is enhanced by all the summer speculation about the future role of Gallagher", and felt that Morgan and Wong were "trying to bring "Millennium" into "X-File" territory". The A.V. Club's Emily VanDerWerff rated the episode a A−, finding that it allows the series to "[turn] a corner, from a serial killer show with stained-glass window overtones, to a show that revels in those overtones, a show that plays in age-old symbols with a decided taste of the weird". VanDerWerff also felt that a monologue delivered by O'Quinn was an example of Morgan and Wong's best writing, and that the actor's delivery was the key to keeping the scene serious in tone. Bill Gibron, writing for DVD Talk, rated the episode 4.5 out of 5, noting that it "starts Season 2 off in high style". Gibron found that the episode "has a nice sense of internal adventure to it, giving us a chance to learn more about our main players while setting the groundwork for some certified surreality to come". Robert Shearman and Lars Pearson, in their book Wanting to Believe: A Critical Guide to The X-Files, Millennium & The Lone Gunmen, rated "The Beginning and the End" two-and-a-half stars out of five. Shearman felt that the episode had "an overwritten quality", citing the Polaroid Man's dialogue as the main example of this; he also believed that the development of Catherine Black as a character seemed poorly executed, with the character lacking enough depth to "retain the audience's sympathies".

== Footnotes ==
=== References ===
- Genge, N. E. (1997). Millennium: The Unofficial Companion Volume Two. Century. ISBN 0712678697.
- Lowry, Brian (1995). The Truth is Out There: The Official Guide to the X-Files. Harper Prism. ISBN 0-06-105330-9.
- Shearman, Robert; Pearson, Lars (2009). Wanting to Believe: A Critical Guide to The X-Files, Millennium & The Lone Gunmen. Mad Norwegian Press. ISBN 978-0975944691.
