= Familiar (The X-Files) =

- The X-Files episode
- Episode no.: Season 11; Episode 8
- Directed by: Holly Dale
- Written by: Benjamin Van Allen
- Production code: 2AYW09
- Original air date: March 7, 2018
- Running time: 43 minutes

Guest appearances
- Alex Carter as Chief Strong; Erin Chambers as Anna Strong; Jason Gray-Stanford as Officer Rick Eggers; Roger Cross as Officer Wentworth; Ken Godmere as Melvin Peter; Sharon Taylor as Diana Eggers; Sebastian Billingsley-Rodriguez as Andrew Eggers; Sean Campbell as Officer Sean; Emma Oliver as Emily Strong

Episode chronology
← Previous "Rm9sbG93ZXJz"	Next → "Nothing Lasts Forever"
- The X-Files season 11

"Familiar" is the eighth episode of the eleventh season of the American science fiction television series The X-Files. The episode was written by Benjamin Van Allen, and directed by Holly Dale. It aired on March 7, 2018, on Fox. The episode is a monster of the week tale unconnected to the series wider Mythology.

The show centers on FBI special agents who work on unsolved paranormal cases called X-Files; focusing on the investigations of Fox Mulder (David Duchovny), and Dana Scully (Gillian Anderson) after their reinstatement in the FBI. In this episode, Mulder and Scully investigate the brutal animal attack of a little boy in Connecticut, while suspecting darker forces are at play.

== Plot ==
At a park in Eastwood, Connecticut, a little boy named Andrew sings a theme song from a children's show while playing with his "Mr. Chuckleteeth" toy. While Andrew's mother, Diane, is distracted by a phone call, the boy spots a life-sized version of Mr. Chuckleteeth meandering in the forest. When she turns around, Andrew has disappeared. As Diane frantically searches for the boy, Andrew has followed Mr. Chuckleteeth into the forest. A few hours later, a group of police investigators, including Andrew’s father Rick, discover Andrew's mangled corpse.

Because the killing of a law enforcement officer's child puts the case under FBI jurisdiction, Fox Mulder and Dana Scully investigate. While Mulder initially suggests that the culprit could be a coywolf or, more exotically, a hellhound, Scully observes during the boy's autopsy that the neck injuries which killed the boy were most consistent with being shaken to death; she suggests a profile of a serial offender. Mulder finds a substance resembling sand or salt on the boy's ankle. While the town gathers to mourn the death of the boy, Mulder goes to the house of Chief Strong, head of the local police. Mulder notes they have several books on the town's history, which includes witchcraft trials. He interviews the chief's daughter Emily, who was with Andrew at the park. Emily tells Mulder and her mother Anna that she saw Mr. Chuckleteeth in the forest before Andrew was killed.

Back at the police department, Rick searches the sex offender database and finds a man named Melvin Peter. When Scully and Chief Strong look for Rick, they spot him racing away in a patrol car. Chief Strong and Scully chase after him. Rick reaches Peter's house and breaks in, brandishing a gun. Mulder, Scully, and Chief Strong find that Peter is not home, but discover numerous pictures of Peter performing as a clown at children’s parties. Peter's closet contains a caged monkey, clown costumes, and a Mr. Chuckleteeth mask and shoes. Meanwhile, Emily is lured outside her house by a character from one of her children's programs standing on her lawn. She is later found dead, murdered in the same manner as Andrew. Mulder notices a salt circle around the body, suggesting use of witchcraft.

When Peter returns to the neighborhood, Rick attacks him. Mulder confronts Chief Strong and forces him to admit that he has been unfaithful to his wife, knows witchcraft is involved and that Peter is not their suspect. At the park, a crowd gathers to watch Rick brutally beat Peter, who denies killing the children. The police arrive and try to disperse the mob; when they fail, Mulder fires his gun into the air. Rick is taken off of Peter, but suddenly pulls his service weapon and shoots Peter in the head. After Rick is put on bail, he goes home to confront Diane about an affair she had with Chief Strong. Diane leaves the house and drives to a freeway. There, she runs into the hellhound in Andrew's form and flips her car when swerving to avoid it.

Rick breaks into Chief Strong’s house, where he encounters Mr. Chuckleteeth. Rick chases Mr. Chuckleteeth to the front of the house, where he finds Chief Strong has come home and is now pointing a gun at him. Mulder and Scully arrive to find that Chief Strong has shot Rick dead. After fleeing his house, Chief Strong finds Diane's overturned car on the road and follows what appears to be Diane into the woods, failing to notice her mauled corpse on the forest floor (having been killed by the demon). Mulder and Scully visit the park where Andrew disappeared and head into the woods. Chief Strong finds his wife, Anna, standing in a salt circle in the woods holding a grimoire. As Strong comes to realize his wife summoned the demon to get revenge on Diane for the affair, the hellhound kills him. Mulder and Scully find Anna standing over Chief Strong's body and rush over to stop her. Anna casts another spell, attempting to seal away the entity she had summoned, but the spell instead causes her to suddenly burst into flames and die. Afterwards, Scully delivers the grimoire (which mysteriously didn't burn) to the authorities and she and Mulder leave the town. As they drive away, a piece of playground equipment starts spinning on its own.

== Production ==
=== Filming ===
Filming for the season began in August 2017 in Vancouver, British Columbia, where the previous season was filmed, along with the show's original five seasons. The episode was directed by first-time X-Files director Holly Dale, who was announced as a director in August 2017.

=== Writing ===
The episode was written by staff writer Benjamin Van Allen, his first writing credit for the series. He served as a writer's assistant in season 10.

Van Allen spoke of his inspiration for this episode in an interview:

"I've always been creeped out by children's television show characters, like Teletubbies. There is another show I saw that kind of inspired the Bibble-Tiggles, as we call them in the show, called Boohbahs. A lot of kid's shows like that, when you watch them, you're like, 'Holy shit. How am I letting my kid watch this? It's so weird.' Kid's TV shows have always really creeped me out. I really just wanted to make a classic X-Files episode. It's a monster-of-the-week episode, but not all MOTW episodes actually have a monster. I really wanted to have some recognizable monster for the episode. That's where the Mr. Chuckleteeth guy came in. Like the classic X-Files feel, I definitely wanted to set it in a small town. I wanted to start the episode in the town with Mulder and Scully, and end the episode in the town with Mulder and Scully. As much as I love all the X-Files lore, I didn't want to see the X-Files office, I didn't want to put Skinner in this episode. I just wanted it to be a very classic, standalone monster-of-the-week episode."

Van Allen's idea for "Mr. Chuckleteeth" came from an old British kids TV series called Jigsaw, where one character is named Mr. Noseybonk.

== Reception ==
"Familiar" received generally positive reviews from critics. On Rotten Tomatoes, it has an approval rating of 80% with an average rating of 6.38 out of 10 based on 10 reviews. Matt Fowler of IGN called the episode "a solid, self contained monster-of-the-week creep out, that went really dark at times, but faltered a bit under unnecessary, and muddled, messaging" and scored it a 7.4 out of 10. Liz Shannon Miller of IndieWire said "It’s genuinely impressive how much “Familiar” felt like a vintage “X-Files” episode, given that both its writer (newcomer Benjamin Van Allen) and director (veteran Canadian Holly Dale, the second woman hired to direct this season and fourth total across the show’s 218 episodes) have never worked on the show before now. Clean and direct in its standalone approach, it wasn’t the most twisty of mysteries, but did deliver the sort of supernatural weirdness we remember fondly from the show’s earliest years."

In its initial broadcast in the United States on March 7, 2018, it received 3.46 million viewers, which was up from the previous episode, which had 3.23 million viewers.

In December of 2018, Tim Surette at TV Guide named Familiar's Mr. Chuckleteeth the best TV villain of 2018, saying "If you've ever watched any kids' television shows, you know that they're full of messed-up sh--. In "Familiar," The X-Files went back to the classic monster-of-the-week format with Mr. Chuckle Teeth, a toy based on a character from a children's series who comes to life and murders people. It's actually a demon, but even if it wasn't, we still would have peed our pants."
