= Gabe Rotter =

American writer and producer

- Born: April 16, 1978 (age 48); Long Island, New York, United States
- Education: University of Southern California
- Occupations: Writer, Producer
- Notable work: The Beast in Me; Duck Duck Wally; The Human Bobby; The X-Files
- Partner: Bree Abel Rotter (2007 – present)

Gabe Rotter (born April 16, 1978) is an Emmy-nominated American television writer/producer and novelist, most well known for being the creator, writer, and executive producer of The Beast in Me for Netflix, starring Claire Danes and Matthew Rhys. He is also author of Simon & Schuster's Duck Duck Wally and The Human Bobby. in addition, he was a writer and producer on season 11 of The X-Files which aired in 2018.

== Early life ==
Rotter grew up in the same complex in Woodbury, Nassau County, New York, as writer Lesley Arfin and they both attended Syosset High School. He earned a film degree from the University of Southern California. Rotter began his career as a production assistant and later the writers' assistant on the paranormal television show The X-Files, working under series creator Chris Carter.

== Career ==
Rotter wrote his first novel, Duck Duck Wally, which was published by Simon & Schuster in 2008. The novel "...pays entertaining dividends in this slapstick send-up of show business in general and hip-hop in particular,” commented a Kirkus Reviews critic. A Publishers Weekly reviewer noted that “Rotter’s a talented writer.” Booklist called the book "Clever and funny."

In 2010, Rotter published his second novel from Simon & Schuster, titled The Human Bobby. Booklist described the book as "An oddly constructed novel, but an oddly endearing one, too, with a protagonist you can’t help rooting for."

In 2014 Rotter produced a television pilot for Amazon called The After, which was written and directed by Chris Carter.

In 2015 Rotter was a writer/producer on 20th Century Fox Television's 6-episode revival of The X-Files.

In 2017, Rotter was a writer/producer on the eleventh season of The X-Files on Fox, having written one episode titled, "Kitten."

In 2024, it was announced that Rotter created The Beast in Me for Netflix, starring Claire Danes and Matthew Rhys. The series premiered on November 13, 2025.

In 2026 he was nominated for two Emmy Awards for The Beast in Me; Outstanding Writing for a Limited or Anthology series, and Outstanding Limited or Anthology Series.
