= Roosters (Millennium) =

- Millennium episode
- Episode no.: Season 2 Episode 16
- Directed by: Thomas J. Wright
- Written by: Glen Morgan; James Wong
- Original air date: March 13, 1998

Guest appearances
- Kristen Cloke as Lara Means; R.G. Armstrong as The Old Man; Kimberley Patton as Clear Knight; Philip Baker Hall as Group Elder

Episode chronology
← Previous "Owls"	Next → "Siren"
- Millennium season 2

"Roosters" is the 16th episode of the second season of the American crime-thriller television series Millennium. It was originally shown on the Fox network on March 13, 1998. The episode was written by Glen Morgan and James Wong, and directed by Thomas J. Wright.

Millennium Group offender profilers Frank Black (Lance Henriksen) and Peter Watts (Terry O'Quinn) become embroiled in a growing schism within the Group, prompted by the discovery of the True Cross. "Roosters" is the second half of a two-part episode, continuing the story which began in "Owls".

"Roosters" develops plot elements introduced both in "Owls" and in the earlier instalment "The Hand of St. Sebastian", and would later be followed up by the season's two-part finale. The episode also features the use of operatic music, a decision praised by the show's composer Mark Snow. The episode featured guest appearances by Kristen Cloke, Philip Baker Hall and R. G. Armstrong. "Roosters" received a mixed critical reaction, and attracted 5.4 percent of the available audience during its initial broadcast.

== Plot ==
Continuing from the preceding episode, Frank Black approaches the car that has been surveilling his home. The occupants claim to be fellow members of the Millennium Group, but soon open fire on him. Black takes cover and returns fire, shooting one of the gunmen before the car speeds away; it is later found abandoned.

Meanwhile, Lara Means (Kristen Cloke), examining evidence relating to Johnston's murder, discovers that Peter Watts (Terry O'Quinn) had suppressed infrared post-mortem photographs. Learning of this, the Elder (Philip Baker Hall) — a high-ranking Group official — demands an explanation. Watts divulges that Johnston had been conspiring to pit the conflicting factions within the Group, the Roosters and the Owls, against each other. Watts had found evidence in one of the photographs which may have influenced such a schism and wished to keep it hidden until its significance could be known. The Elder agrees, and similarly decides to hold off on testing which would reveal if an artifact in Johnston's possession was an authentic piece of the True Cross.

Black's wife Catherine (Megan Gallagher) is approached at her new job at Aerotech International by a colleague who reveals that the company is part of the Odessa network. Meanwhile, Black visits Catherine's boss, Clear Knight (Kimberly Patton), experiencing visions of Nazi Germany after seeing a watercolor painting in her office. Later that night, Black is visited by Means and the Old Man (R. G. Armstrong), another high-ranking Group member. They explain to Black that the Group has, throughout history, been privy to scientific discoveries of which the public has no knowledge. Johnston had theorized the existence of a tear in the universe which would reach Earth in several decades, and his death may be connected to this theory. The Old Man also explains that the Group has been infiltrated by members of the Odessa network, a faction founded by fugitive Nazis.

When Catherine finds her colleague dead, she flees from the Aerotech premises and finds Frank, who has deduced that her job offer was simply a way for Odessa to reach him. Elsewhere, an Odessa agent murders the Old Man in Frank's home; the loss serves to reunite Black, Watts and Means, who contrive a plan to strike back at Odessa. As the Elder conducts a funeral for the Old Man, a car bomb kills his assassin, while Odessa's Paraguayan headquarters is destroyed, and Knight's company is raided and closed. The Elder finishes his rites and returns home, opening a package delivered from the Middle East. Inside is the fragment of the True Cross.

== Production ==
"Roosters" was written by the frequent collaborators Glen Morgan and James Wong, who were also co-executive producers for the second season. It was the 13th episode to have been written by them - they had written several across the first and second seasons of the series. "Roosters" was directed by Thomas J. Wright who had directed twelve episodes previously and directed a further 13 over the series' run. Wright went on to direct "Millennium", the series' crossover episode with its sister show The X-Files.

Morgan has noted that the plot for "Roosters", and the previous instalment "Owls", grew out of the internecine conflict seen within the Millennium Group in "The Hand of St. Sebastian", an earlier second-season episode he wrote with Wong. He had wanted to introduce secular elements to the series' focus on eschatology, after the theological focus of the earlier episode; he began focusing on ideas such as biological warfare as a possible way of depicting the end of the world — an idea which later played out in the two-part episodes concluding the second season, "The Time Is Now" and "The Fourth Horseman". Millennium's composer, Mark Snow, spoke positively about the series' producers for their decision to use operatic music in this episode, rather than relying on "hip-hop or rock and roll" as prior episodes had done.

== Broadcast and reception ==
"Roosters" was first broadcast on the Fox network on March 13, 1998. The episode earned a Nielsen rating of 5.4 during its original broadcast, meaning that 5.4 percent of households in the United States viewed the episode, representing approximately 5.29 million households. (Note: Each ratings point represented 980,000 households during the 1997–98 television season.)

The A.V. Club's Zack Handlen gave the episode an "A−", finding that it "lacks the wild momentum of "Owls"". However, Handlen felt that, mostly as a result of its characters and the performances given, the episode was a satisfying conclusion to the story arc. Handlen particularly highlighted O'Quinn's performance, reflecting positively on his increased importance in the series and noting that "portrayal of an acolyte struggling with the demands and doubts of his faith does as much for Millennium as Henriksen's work". Bill Gibron, writing for DVD Talk, rated "Roosters" 5 out of 5, calling both it and "Owls" a "dense, deceptive set of shows" which focus on the personal and ideological conflicts between their characters. Robert Shearman and Lars Pearson, in their book Wanting to Believe: A Critical Guide to The X-Files, Millennium & The Lone Gunmen, rated the episode one-and-a-half stars out of five, calling it "dull and flabby". Shearman felt that the plot failed to capitalise on what had been set up by "Owls", offering more exposition than resolution. However, he highlighted the work of Thomas J. Wright, finding that those scenes which allowed for more action were directed well.

== Footnotes ==
=== References ===
- Shearman, Robert; Pearson, Lars (2009). Wanting to Believe: A Critical Guide to The X-Files, Millennium & The Lone Gunmen. Mad Norwegian Press. ISBN 978-0975944691.
- McLean, James; Henriksen, Lance; Spotnitz, Frank; Carter, Chris (2012). Chamberlain, Adam; Dixon, Brian A. (eds.). Back to Frank Black. Fourth Horseman Press. ISBN 978-0988392298.
- Chris Carter, John Peter Kousakis, Lance Henriksen, Michael R. Perry, Ken Horton, Thomas J. Wright, Mark Snow, Chip Johannessen, Kristen Cloke, Megan Gallagher, Frank Spotnitz, Mark Freeborn (2004). The Turn of the Tide: The Making of Season 2 (DVD). Millennium: The Complete Second Season: 20th Century Fox Home Entertainment.
