= Kitten (The X-Files) =

- The X-Files episode
- Episode no.: Season 11; Episode 6
- Directed by: Carol Banker
- Written by: Gabe Rotter
- Production code: 2AYW06
- Original air date: February 7, 2018
- Running time: 43 minutes

Guest appearances
- James Pickens Jr. as Alvin Kersh; Haley Joel Osment as young John "Kitten" James / Davey James; Cory Rempel as young Walter Skinner; Jovan Nenadic as John "Kitten" James; Brendan Patrick Connor as Sherriff Mac Stenzler; Jeremy Jones as Sergeant

Episode chronology
← Previous "Ghouli"	Next → "Rm9sbG93ZXJz"
- The X-Files season 11

"Kitten" is the sixth episode of the eleventh season of the American science fiction television series The X-Files. The episode was written by Gabe Rotter and directed by Carol Banker. It was aired on February 7, 2018, on Fox. The tagline for this episode is "A war is never over". The episode is a monster of the week style plot unconnected to the overarching mythology of the series.

The show centers on FBI special agents who work on unsolved paranormal cases called X-Files; focusing on the investigations of Fox Mulder (David Duchovny), and Dana Scully (Gillian Anderson) after their reinstatement in the FBI. In this episode, Walter Skinner (Mitch Pileggi) disappears after he receives a disturbing message from his past. Mulder and Scully are charged with finding him but as they start to uncover his secrets, they begin to question whether they can trust him.

== Plot ==
In 1969, during the Vietnam War, a platoon of U.S. Marines including Walter Skinner and John "Kitten" James are tasked with escorting a crate marked "MK-NAOMI" to a rendezvous point. They come under enemy fire as they reach the landing zone and are forced to take shelter with a group of civilians in a hut. As Skinner doubles back to help a wounded soldier, the crate is damaged by gunfire and Kitten is exposed to a green gas. When he returns to the hut, Skinner finds Kitten has murdered the civilians.

In the present, Fox Mulder and Dana Scully are called before FBI Director Alvin Kersh, who informs them that Skinner has vanished without explanation. The agents search Skinner's apartment and find out he was mailed a severed human ear. Mulder identifies the parcel as coming from the town of Mud Lick, Kentucky. During their journey to the town, Scully finds that Skinner's service record and the records of his platoon are classified as top secret. Mulder and Scully arrive to find a body in the local morgue missing an ear; Mulder realizes that the victim was killed by a punji stake—a Viet Cong booby trap. Scully questions the sheriff about a mass hysteria gripping the town amid claims of a monster lurking in the nearby woods and people inexplicably losing their teeth.

The body of Banjo, another Vietnam veteran, is found at the bottom of a punji pit. A nearby camera, supposedly used to monitor deer in the area, has recorded Banjo's death and shows Skinner approaching the pit shortly after Banjo fell in. Mulder and Scully lose the support of local authorities when they admit Skinner is their boss, and are unable to convince the sheriff that he is innocent. Mulder continues to watch the video and sees a hooded and cloaked figure lurking in the woods: the "monster" terrorizing the town, which Mulder immediately dismisses as a person in a costume.

Skinner approaches Davey James, Kitten's son, in his hunting cabin. Davey accuses Skinner of failing to help Kitten, explaining that Kitten became increasingly violent after being exposed to MK-NAOMI and was court-martialed upon his return home. Kitten was committed to a mental health facility outside Mud Lick, partly due to Skinner's testimony. Skinner describes that his superiors prevented him from telling the truth regarding the gas which turned him into a killer. Davey reveals that all of the soldiers exposed to MK-NAOMI were sent to the same facility and continued to be experimented on, implying that Kitten's initial exposure was orchestrated by the government. Initially an attempt to turn soldiers into more efficient weapons of war by channeling their fear into aggression, the scope of MK-NAOMI was expanded to become a means of controlling peoples' minds.

Skinner asks Davey to take him to Kitten; Davey leads him to a tree where Kitten hung himself after leaving the facility. As he approaches Kitten's body, Skinner falls into another punji pit and is impaled on a spike. Davey abandons him as Mulder and Scully arrive, having looked into Vietnam veterans in the area. Davey claims no knowledge of Skinner and starts ranting about a government conspiracy to control the population with MK-NAOMI, which he claims is a perfected version of MK-ULTRA. The agents ostensibly accept his explanation and leave, but Mulder suspects Davey after noticing photos of Kitten and Skinner in his cabin. He doubles back and investigates the cabin, finding the "monster" costume from the video. A search of the area leads him to Skinner in the punji pit. Davey attempts to ambush them, but is caught and killed by one of his own booby traps.

Mulder and Scully ask Skinner about a claim made by Kersh that they were responsible for Skinner's lack of career advancement. Skinner admits that his prior experience with Kitten and MK-NAOMI in Vietnam shook his faith in the government, but their willingness to pursue the truth wherever it takes them restored his faith in people and holding shadowy government to account. He resolves to return to Washington and use his position to fight the government's abuse of power. As Skinner leaves, one of his teeth falls out, implying that he has been exposed to MK-NAOMI. In the epilogue, a crop duster is seen spraying a field with a green gas as Davey's warnings about government conspiracies are repeated in voiceover.

== Production ==
After season 10, actor Mitch Pileggi said to series creator Chris Carter regarding the lack of use of his character, "I was whining last season about not having enough screen time or not having enough to do on the show. And at one point when I was talking to Chris about it, I said, 'Is Skinner really hard to write for?' And he was like, 'No.' And I was like, 'Well, how come we haven't done it?'," he says, laughing. "It's funny, because Gabe Rotter was standing there, listening to this conversation, and he said that was when the light went off in his head."

Filming for the season began in August 2017 in Vancouver, British Columbia, where the previous season was filmed, along with the show's original five seasons.

The episode features the return of James Pickens Jr. as Alvin Kersh, who last appeared in the original series finale episode which aired in May 2002. Also guest starring is Haley Joel Osment playing a father-son role of John "Kitten" James (in flashbacks) and Davey James (in the present), whose casting was announced in October 2017. The role of young Walter Skinner was played by Mitch Pileggi's nephew, Cory Rempel.

The episode was written by producer Gabe Rotter, his first writing credit for the series. Rotter had previously served as a writers' assistant during season 9. It was directed by Carol Banker, who was a script supervisor on the original series and who also directed an episode of The Lone Gunmen.

== Reception ==
"Kitten" received generally positive reviews from critics. On Rotten Tomatoes, it has an approval rating of 75% with an average rating of 6.44 out of 10 based on 8 reviews.

In its initial broadcast in the United States on February 7, 2018, it received 3.74 million viewers, which was slightly up from the previous week, which had 3.64 million viewers.
