= Nothing Lasts Forever (The X-Files) =

- The X-Files episode
- Episode no.: Season 11; Episode 9
- Directed by: James Wong
- Written by: Karen Nielsen
- Production code: 2AYW08
- Original air date: March 14, 2018
- Running time: 43 minutes

Guest appearances
- Fiona Vroom as Barbara Beaumont; Jere Burns as Dr. Randolph Luvenis; Carlena Britch as Juliet 'La Avispa' Bocanegra; Micaela Aquilera as Olivia Bocanegra; Fabiloa Colmenero as Josephine Bocanegra; Aidan Kahn as Agent Colquitt; Albert Nicholas as Agent Bill Bludworth

Episode chronology
← Previous "Familiar"	Next → "My Struggle IV"
- The X-Files season 11

"Nothing Lasts Forever" is the ninth episode of the eleventh season of the American science fiction television series The X-Files. The episode was written by Karen Nielsen, and directed by James Wong. It aired on March 14, 2018, on Fox. The episode is the series’ last monster of the week tale unconnected to the series overarching Mythology.

The show centers on FBI special agents who work on unsolved paranormal cases called X-Files; focusing on the investigations of Fox Mulder (David Duchovny), and Dana Scully (Gillian Anderson) after their reinstatement in the FBI. In this episode, Mulder and Scully, while investigating human organ theft, uncover a mysterious cult consumed with macabre rituals. The tagline for this episode is "I want to be beautiful."

== Plot ==
At a makeshift operating theater in the Bronx, two surgeons harvest a man of his organs, killing him in the process. The operation is interrupted by Juliet, a young woman who kills the surgeons by driving metal spikes through their chests. She secures most of the organs and delivers them to a nearby hospital with a message: "I will repay".

Fox Mulder and Dana Scully are drawn to the case because evidence suggests a ritual killing. The police believe the murders are related to an organ theft ring, pointing out that one of the surgeons had his medical license revoked and was an associate of the Russian mafia. Meeting at a church, the agents debate the nature of faith. Scully confirms that all legal organ donations have been accounted for while Mulder has found no trace of illegal sales on the dark web. Mulder links the killer's message to a psalm about God's vengeance and notices that iron bars matching the murder weapon's distinctive shape have been removed from the church fence. Because of this, he believes that the murders are driven by divine wrath instead of demonic worship.

A conversation with a priest leads them to Juliet, who tells Mulder and Scully that her sister Olivia joined a cult. Meanwhile, the missing organs are taken to the home of reclusive TV star Barbara Beaumont (based on the names of sitcom stars Barbara Billingsley and Hugh Beaumont) and her partner Randolph Luvenis. Beaumont has formed a cult, Randy Organ Harvesters (named after her partner, Randolph), which consumes human organs to offset the aging process; despite being eighty-five, Beaumont appears to be thirty. The effects are temporary, leading Luvenis to surgically conjoin himself to others, parasitically feeding off them to reverse his age. They have been feeding organs to their followers and plan to conjoin them to Barbara in the hopes of giving her eternal youth. However, the stolen organs are not enough to feed the cult. As Luvenis leaves to steal the remaining organs from the hospital, a cult member offers himself as a sacrifice to sustain the others. After he stabs himself, he is eaten alive.

Mulder and Scully arrange for a tracking device to be placed in a heart for Luvenis to retrieve, then follow the signal to Beaumont's house. Luvenis, suffering accelerated ageing without a host, undergoes surgery to attach himself to Olivia. Once inside the house, the agents are overpowered by Beaumont's followers, who throw Scully down an elevator shaft. Mulder is rescued by Juliet, who kills Beaumont with a metal stake to the chest. Her death disheartens her followers, allowing Mulder to escape. As he tries to locate Scully in the basement, he is confronted by Luvenis, who has the appearance and strength of a much younger man after being conjoined to Olivia. Luvenis boasts to Mulder that he has cured aging. Olivia proclaims her faith in Luvenis's methods, but she seizes, and when Mulder demands that she be taken to a hospital, Luvenis threatens to cut her throat. Juliet catches up with them and kills Luvenis; she then surrenders to Mulder. Scully is found safe, cushioned by trash thrown away by the cult.

In the aftermath, Olivia is shown safe at home with her mother. Mulder acknowledges the power of faith, suggesting that his atheism is because he does not need faith rather than because of a lack of it.

== Production ==
=== Filming ===
Filming for the season began in August 2017 in Vancouver, British Columbia, where the previous season was filmed, along with the show's original five seasons. The episode was directed by James Wong.

=== Writing ===
The episode was written by Karen Nielsen, her first writing credit for the series. Nielsen also served as the script coordinator for seasons 10 and 11. Nielsen's inspiration for the episode was revealed in an interview with SyfyWire:

"So, I've been fascinated with people that are very religious. My sister is very Catholic and I am not. It's always been fascinating to me that Scully is very Catholic and Mulder is not. I pitched that I think it would be interesting to have Scully reflect on her religion a bit, especially with what was going on in her life with William. And then Glen [Morgan] thought a cult would be a really interesting way to juxtapose that. And I was like yes, you're right. And Jim [Wong] was super excited too. So, Glen brought on the cult idea, and that is where I think the germ of the emotion journey came."

Even though the episode is the penultimate episode of the season, Nielsen felt she wanted the final scene of the episode to relate to the upcoming conclusion. She wanted everything to lead up to William, trying to build some momentum that she felt was needed.

== Reception ==
=== Critical reception ===
"Nothing Lasts Forever" received positive reviews from critics. On Rotten Tomatoes, it has an approval rating of 90% with an average rating of 7.6 out of 10 based on 10 reviews. Liz Shannon Miller of IndieWire called the episode a pretty on-the-nose title, but one worth letting rattle around in the brains this week, as preparation for the season finale.

=== Ratings ===
In its initial broadcast in the United States on March 14, 2018, it received 3.01 million viewers, which was a decrease from the previous episode, which had 3.46 million viewers.
