= The Beast in Me (TV series) =

2025 American psychological thriller series

- Promotional poster
- Genre: Psychological thriller; Crime drama
- Created by: Gabe Rotter
- Showrunner: Howard Gordon
- Directed by: Antonio Campos; Tyne Rafaeli; Lila Neugebauer
- Starring: Claire Danes; Matthew Rhys; Brittany Snow; Natalie Morales
- Theme music composer: Sean Callery
- Composers: Sean Callery; Tim Callobre; Sara Barone
- Country of origin: United States
- Original language: English
- No. of seasons: 1
- No. of episodes: 8

Production
- Executive producers: Howard Gordon; Daniel Pearle; Antonio Campos; Gabe Rotter; Claire Danes; Conan O'Brien; David Kissinger; Jeff Ross; Caroline Baron; Jodie Foster
- Producer: Sean Fogel
- Cinematography: Lyle Vincent
- Editors: Philip Neel; Kane Platt; Ralph Jean-Pierre; Shelby Siegel
- Running time: 41–54 minutes
- Production companies: Teakwood Lane Productions; Overall Production; Conaco; 20th Television

Original release
- Network: Netflix
- Release: November 14, 2025 – present

The Beast in Me is an American psychological crime thriller television series, created by Gabe Rotter for Netflix, starring Claire Danes and Matthew Rhys. Executive producers on the series include Jodie Foster and Conan O'Brien. It premiered on November 14, 2025, and received generally positive reviews from critics and nine nominations at the 78th Primetime Emmy Awards, including Outstanding Limited or Anthology Series, with Rhys winning Outstanding Lead Actor in a Limited or Anthology Series or Movie. Although The Beast in Me was originally billed as a miniseries, it was renewed for a second season in September 2026.

== Premise ==
The series follows an author Aggie Wiggs (Danes) who begins writing a book about her new next-door neighbor Nile Jarvis (Rhys), a real estate executive who allegedly killed his wife.

== Cast ==
=== Main ===
- Claire Danes as Aggie Wiggs, a grieving author who struggles to write her next book
- Matthew Rhys as Nile Jarvis, the son of a real estate magnate who moves next door to Aggie's house in Oyster Bay, New York, on Long Island to live in a more secluded manner with his second wife as he allegedly killed his first wife
- Brittany Snow as Nina Jarvis, Nile's second wife who is a gallerist in Manhattan
- Natalie Morales as Shelley Morris, Aggie's ex-wife who is a painter

=== Recurring ===
- Jonathan Banks as Martin Jarvis, Nile's father who is a ruthless real estate mogul
- David Lyons as Agent Brian Abbott, an FBI agent who previously investigated the Jarvis family
- Tim Guinee as Rick "Wrecking Ball" Jarvis, Nile's uncle who is also his security detail
- Deirdre O'Connell as Carol McGiddish, Aggie's literary agent and trusted friend
- Bubba Weiler as Teddy Fenig, a young drunk driver who killed Aggie's son
- Hettienne Park as Agent Erika Breton, an FBI agent who is Abbott's supervisor and lover
- Aleyse Shannon as Olivia Benitez, a city council member who opposes Nile's business plans
- Julie Ann Emery as Lila Jarvis, Martin Jarvis' wife and Nile's stepmother
- Amir Arison as Frank Breton, FBI Agent Erika Breton's ex-husband

=== Guest starring ===
- Leonard Gerome as Cooper Morris-Wiggs, Aggie and Shelley's 8-year-old son who died in a drunk driving incident
- Brennan Brown as Phineas Gold, a city councilman whose campaign the Jarvises bankrolled
- Will Brill as Christopher Ingram, the brother of Nile's missing wife
- Kate Burton as Mariah Ingram, the mother of Nile's missing wife
- Bill Irwin as James Ingram, the father of Nile's missing wife
- Mozhan Navabi as Esme Noor, a political strategist hired by the Jarvises to do opposition research on city council members opposing Jarvis Yards
- Raphael Sbarge as Nick Ryder, the Jarvises' attorney
- Becky Ann Baker as Tessa Baldwin, Abbott's superior in the FBI
- Leila George as Madison Jarvis (née Ingram), Nile's missing wife

== Episodes ==
No.	Title	Directed by	Written by	Original release date	Prod. code
1	"Sick Puppy"	Antonio Campos	Teleplay by : Gabe Rotter and Daniel Pearle; Story by : Gabe Rotter	November 13, 2025	1XED01
Author Agatha "Aggie" Wiggs struggles to write her next book while grieving her 8 year old son Cooper, who died years earlier in a drunk-driving incident. She learns that Nile Jarvis, a real estate developer suspected of murder after the mysterious disappearance of his first wife, Madison, now ruled deceased, has moved in next door. Aggie meets Nile and his second wife, Nina; Nile fails to persuade her to support building a neighborhood jogging path. On the anniversary of Cooper's death, Aggie and her ex-wife, Shelley, visit his grave and spot the drunk driver, Teddy Fenig, leaving flowers with his mother, sparking a confrontation. Aggie later agrees to lunch with Nile, who dismisses her current book idea as uninteresting and suggests she instead write about him. She tells him about Cooper's death and admits she once wished Teddy dead, since he avoided jail time. As they leave, they see Teddy nearby. That night, FBI agent Brian Abbott visits Aggie, warning her to be cautious around Nile. She learns that Abbott led the investigation into Madison's disappearance. The next morning, Aggie hears that Teddy has presumably died in an apparent suicide, although no body has been found, just as in the case of Madison.
2	"Just Don't Want to Be Lonely"	Antonio Campos	Gabe Rotter	November 13, 2025	1XED02
Aggie visits the scene of Teddy's death but leaves when his mother notices and accuses her. On the way home, she encounters Nile, who asks about Teddy's death, which raises her suspicions. She meets Abbott in Central Park and tells him she worries Nile may have killed Teddy, but he urges her to drop it. As she leaves the city, Aggie sees a protest led by liberal councilwoman Olivia Benitez against Jarvis Yards, Nile's family real-estate company. Aggie then agrees to write a book about Nile, framing it to him as a chance to present his side of Madison's disappearance. The next morning, Nina invites Aggie on a walk and reveals she was Madison's personal assistant before Madison disappeared. While they are out, Nile's uncle and security chief, Rick, searches Aggie's house and finds a note with Abbott's name on it. After returning home, Aggie calls Abbott to update him about the book. That night, FBI agent Erika Breton—Abbott's supervisor and secret lover—is confronted by Rick, who forces her into his car.
3	"Elephant in the Room"	Tyne Rafaeli	Erika Sheffer	November 13, 2025	1XED03
Rick informs his brother, Martin—Nile's father and CEO of Jarvis Yards—about Aggie's planned book. Aggie conducts her first interview with Nile, and he invites her to a family birthday party. Nina visits Shelley's art studio, having noticed one of her paintings at Aggie's home, and offers to feature her work in an exhibition. Rick tells Nile that Aggie has been speaking with Abbott. While Aggie is at Abbott's apartment to devise a plan to track Nile's movements, Nile calls asking her to meet him at Jarvis Yards; she agrees, and Abbott follows. Nile brings her to the edge of a high-rise under construction and confronts her about contacting Abbott. Aggie insists Abbott is only a source for her book and offers Nile greater editorial control, which placates him. Aggie attends the Jarvis family birthday party while Abbott breaks into Nile's home to copy files from his computer. Nile abruptly leaves the party with Nina after he and Martin learn that a city councilman in their pocket has withdrawn his support for Jarvis Yards. Aggie alerts Abbott, who escapes with the data just before Nile and Nina return, but his leg is severely injured by Nile's dogs during his getaway.
4	"Thanatos"	Tyne Rafaeli	C.A. Johnson	November 13, 2025	1XED04
Abbott visits an underground contact to decrypt the files he retrieved from Nile's computer, keeping his investigation off-book since the FBI considers the case closed. Nina rescinds her offer to showcase Shelley's art after Aggie points out the conflict of interest, leading to a fight between Aggie and Shelley. Aggie visits Madison's parents, and is surprised to learn they believe Nile to be innocent and their daughter's death a suicide brought on by her bipolar disorder. They give Aggie a copy of Madison's suicide note and reveal that she attempted suicide two years prior to her disappearance, with Nile having saved her life. Abbott receives Nile's decrypted files and is shocked to discover a live feed of a still-alive Teddy Fenig held captive. Abbott tails Nile to a warehouse, where Nile meets councilwoman Benitez and unsuccessfully asks her to approve zoning for Jarvis Yards' new project in exchange for donating the building to the city. Abbott confronts Nile at gunpoint afterward, but Nile overpowers him and beats him to death with his own pistol. He then visits Aggie at home late at night for a drink.
5	"Bacchanal"	Lila Neugebauer	Daniel Pearle	November 13, 2025	1XED05
Aggie has drinks with Nile, where she admits she wanted to believe Abbott's theory that Nile is a killer; he tells her Abbott is a recovering addict previously shunned by the FBI. The next day, Nile takes his car containing Abbott's body to an impound and has it demolished. Martin and Rick hire men to incite a violent riot at one of Benitez's protests, hurting her public image. Aggie visits Shelley to apologize for their argument, but Shelley rebuffs her, blaming her for Teddy's suicide. Madison's brother Christopher contacts Aggie and explains that their parents' finances are tied to Jarvis Yards, giving them a motive to believe Nile is innocent, though he does not. He gives Aggie a box of Madison's belongings, including her birding journal. While examining it, Aggie notices that a page has been torn out and matches the suicide note—implying the note was written during Madison's earlier suicide attempt, not before her actual presumed death. Aggie texts Abbott saying she has proof Nile killed Madison; Nile, who is in the process of disposing of Abbott's phone and badge, receives the message and replies telling her not to tell anyone before throwing the phone into the water.
6	"The Beast and Me"	Lila Neugebauer	Ali Liebegott	November 13, 2025	1XED06
Nile visits Teddy, who he has captive in a storage unit, and calls Rick for help. Aggie breaks into Abbott's apartment and finds it empty; Erika arrives and confronts Aggie, who explains her connection to Abbott and her belief that Nile repurposed Madison's previous suicide note to cover up her murder. The two find the live feed of Teddy on Abbott's computer. Nina learns she is pregnant despite thinking she was unable to conceive; she tells Nile, who was adamant about not wanting children, but he is seemingly supportive. Martin exploits Benitez's PR crisis to leverage her into accepting the Jarvis Yards deal Nile previously proposed. Aggie returns home to find Nile waiting. He invites her for a walk in the woods and asks if she believes he killed Madison, but Aggie receives a call from her editor that allows her to escape back to her house. The FBI converge upon Aggie's neighborhood after receiving a tip about a suspected kidnapping. Unable to reach Erika, Aggie notices new annotations on the manuscript of her book about Nile, realizing he broke into the house; upstairs, she finds Teddy's dead body placed in Cooper's room.
7	"Ghosts"	Antonio Campos	Mike Skerrett	November 13, 2025	1XED07
The whole episode is a flashback that places the narrative in 2019. Abbott's FBI team arrests cartel lieutenant Pedro Dominguez, who is helping Nile to pay off Jarvis Yards' debts. Nile and Martin realize Abbott has an inside source. Martin and Rick scheme to flip an FBI agent close to Abbott to obstruct the investigation. Erika and her husband Frank agree to divorce to manage legal fees after a construction accident injured a civilian; Rick offers to ease their legal trouble in exchange for information on Abbott. Nile has his attorney take the fall for the Dominguez scandal, allowing the FBI to close the case without tying it to him. Madison is revealed as Abbott's source. Abbott urges her to testify, but she refuses, fearing Nile will kill her and citing suspicious deaths linked to him. Nina confronts Madison for refusing her bipolar medication and quits as her assistant. Nile suspects Nina is the mole, but she tells him Madison met Abbott. At the gallery, Nile catches Madison gathering passports to flee; she pepper-sprays him, but he bludgeons her to death with a statue. Martin and Rick clean the scene, and Madison's prior suicide note surfaces the next day. Aggie watches tabloid coverage of Madison's disappearance before cuddling with Shelley and Cooper.
8	"The Last Word"	Antonio Campos	Howard Gordon & Daniel Pearle	November 13, 2025	1XED08
Aggie flees while the authorities discover Teddy's body at her home. Erika returns to retrieve Madison's suicide note, but Rick and his men threaten her at gunpoint and take the note. Martin suffers a stroke after Rick tells him he helped Nile stage Teddy's body. Aggie calls Erika, but realizes the Jarvises have intimidated her into silence. Aggie calls the police to surrender and goes to Nina's gallery; before they arrive, she tells Nina her evidence that Nile murdered Madison. That night, Nina confronts Nile at home; he eventually explodes into a confession, insisting Madison and Teddy "deserved" their fates. The next day, during Nile and Benitez's press conference announcing their Jarvis Yards deal, Nina reveals she recorded Nile's confession, and police arrive to arrest him. Nile receives three life sentences, and Aggie visits him in prison for a final interview. Nile is later murdered by inmates hired by Rick, who is also arrested after he smothers Martin in the hospital to save him from seeing his legacy tarnished. Aggie publishes her book about Nile, The Beast in Me, acknowledging her own role in perpetuating trauma and vengeance. Nina watches her newborn son with worry before holding him again.

== Production ==
=== Development ===
The series is produced by 20th Television and created, written and executive produced by Gabe Rotter. Rotter initially wrote the script 6–7 years prior to production. It is executive produced by Jodie Foster, Conan O'Brien, Daniel Pearle, who also served as writer, Antonio Campos, who also directed, Jeff Ross and David Kissinger via Conaco, Howard Gordon, who served as showrunner, and Claire Danes, who also stars.

In September 2026, the series was renewed for a second season, with Danes reprising her role and Pearle serving as co-showrunner alongside Gordon.

=== Casting ===
Matthew Rhys joined the cast for the Netflix production in August 2024. Brittany Snow, Natalie Morales, David Lyons and Tim Guinee joined the cast in October 2024. Deirdre O'Connell, Jonathan Banks, Hettienne Park, Aleyse Shannon, Will Brill, Kate Burton, Bill Irwin, Amir Arison, and Julie Ann Emery joined the cast in November 2024.

For season 2, John Goodman joined the cast in October 2026, and Lili Taylor, Riley Keough, Lorelei Olivia Mote, Aaron Paul, Taip Ceman and Matthew James Thomas joined in November 2026.

=== Filming ===
Filming took place in Red Bank, New Jersey in September 2024.

== Release ==
The first season premiered on Netflix, with all eight episodes on November 14, 2025.

== Reception ==
=== Critical response ===
The review aggregator website Rotten Tomatoes reported an 85% approval rating, based on 71 critic reviews, with an average rating of 7.7/10. The website's critics consensus reads: "A cut above the usual murder mystery, The Beast in Me stages a psychological duel that crackles with tension thanks to Claire Danes and Matthew Rhys' superb performances." Metacritic, which uses a weighted average, gave a score of 71 out of 100, based on 29 critics, indicating "generally favorable" reviews.

=== Accolades ===
Award	Year (Note: Indicates the year of ceremony)	Category	Nominee(s)	Result	Ref.
ACE Eddie Awards	2026	Best Edited Limited Series	Shelby Siegel (for "The Last Word")	Nominated	
Actor Awards	2026	Outstanding Performance by a Male Actor in a Television Movie or Limited Series	Matthew Rhys	Nominated	
Actor Awards	2026	Outstanding Performance by a Female Actor in a Television Movie or Limited Series	Claire Danes	Nominated	
Astra TV Awards	2026	Best Limited Series	The Beast in Me	Nominated	
Astra TV Awards	2026	Best Actor in a Limited Series or TV Movie	Matthew Rhys	Nominated	
Astra TV Awards	2026	Best Actress in a Limited Series or TV Movie	Claire Danes	Nominated	
Astra TV Awards	2026	Best Supporting Actress in a Limited Series or TV Movie	Brittany Snow	Nominated	
Critics' Choice Awards	2026	Best Actor in a Limited Series or Movie Made for Television	Matthew Rhys	Nominated	
Directors Guild of America Awards	2026	Outstanding Directorial Achievement in Limited & Anthology Series	Antonio Campos (for "Sick Puppy")	Nominated	
GLAAD Media Awards	2026	Outstanding Limited or Anthology Series	The Beast in Me	Nominated	
Golden Globe Awards	2026	Best Television Limited Series, Anthology Series, or Motion Picture Made for Television	The Beast in Me	Nominated	
Golden Globe Awards	2026	Best Performance by a Male Actor in a Limited Series, Anthology Series, or Motion Picture Made for Television	Matthew Rhys	Nominated	
Golden Globe Awards	2026	Best Performance by a Female Actor in a Limited Series, Anthology Series, or Motion Picture Made for Television	Claire Danes	Nominated	
NAACP Image Awards	2026	Outstanding Writing in a Drama Series	C.A. Johnson (for "Thanatos")	Nominated	
NAACP Image Awards	2026	Outstanding Editing in a Motion Picture or Television Series, Movie, or Special	Ralph Jean-Pierre	Nominated	
Primetime Emmy Awards	2026	Outstanding Limited or Anthology Series	Howard Gordon, Daniel Pearle, Antonio Campos, Gabe Rotter, Claire Danes, Conan O'Brien, David Kissinger, Jeff Ross, Caroline Baron, Jodie Foster, Ali Liebegott, C.A. Johnson, Sean Sforza, and Sean Fogel	Nominated	
Primetime Emmy Awards	2026	Outstanding Lead Actor in a Limited or Anthology Series or Movie	Matthew Rhys	Won	
Primetime Emmy Awards	2026	Outstanding Lead Actress in a Limited or Anthology Series or Movie	Claire Danes	Nominated	
Primetime Creative Arts Emmy Awards	2026	Outstanding Writing for a Limited or Anthology Series or Movie	Gabe Rotter and Daniel Pearle (for "Sick Puppy")	Nominated	
Primetime Creative Arts Emmy Awards	2026	Outstanding Casting for a Limited or Anthology Series or Movie	Julie Tucker and Kim Krakauer	Nominated	
Primetime Creative Arts Emmy Awards	2026	Outstanding Contemporary Costumes for a Limited or Anthology Series or Movie	Arjun Bhasin, Emmanuelle Martin, and Alyssa Avellino-Faivre (for "Elephant in the Room")	Nominated	
Primetime Creative Arts Emmy Awards	2026	Outstanding Music Composition for a Limited or Anthology Series, Movie or Special (Original Dramatic Score)	Sean Callery and Sara Barone (for "The Beast and Me")	Won	
Primetime Creative Arts Emmy Awards	2026	Outstanding Original Main Title Theme Music	Sean Callery	Nominated	
Primetime Creative Arts Emmy Awards	2026	Outstanding Sound Editing for a Limited or Anthology Series, Movie, or Special	Ruy Garcia, Marcello Dubaz, Marissa Littlefield, Isaac Derfel, Otis Streeter, Jo Caron, James Sizemore, and Guy Francoeur (for "Sick Puppy")	Nominated	
Producers Guild of America Awards	2026	David L. Wolper Award for Outstanding Producer of Limited or Anthology Series Television	Howard Gordon, Daniel Pearle, Antonio Campos, Gabe Rotter, Claire Danes, David Kissinger, Caroline Baron, Ali Liebegott, C.A. Johnson, Sean Fogel, and Sean Sforza	Nominated	
Satellite Awards	2026	Best Actor in a Miniseries, Limited Series, or Motion Picture Made for Television	Matthew Rhys	Nominated	
Satellite Awards	2026	Best Actress in a Miniseries, Limited Series, or Motion Picture Made for Television	Claire Danes	Nominated	
Saturn Awards	2026	Best Television Presentation or Limited Series	The Beast in Me	Nominated	
Set Decorators Society of America TV Awards	2026	Best Achievement in Décor/Design of a Television Movie or Limited Series	Michael Nallan and Loren Weeks	Nominated	
Society of Composers & Lyricists Awards	2026	Outstanding Original Title Sequence for a Television Production	Sean Callery	Nominated	
TCA Awards	2026	Outstanding Achievement in Movies, Miniseries, or Specials	The Beast in Me	Nominated	
Writers Guild of America Awards	2026	Limited Series	Howard Gordon, C.A. Johnson, Ali Liebegott, Daniel Pearle, Gabe Rotter, Erika Sheffer, and Mike Skerrett	Nominated	

== Influences ==
It has been speculated that the series is based on the life of murderer Robert Durst.
