= The Field Where I Died =

- The X-Files episode
- Fox Mulder looks at pictures of his past life. The photographs were created by combining different public domain photographs with computer effects.
- Episode no.: Season 4 Episode 5
- Directed by: Rob Bowman
- Written by: Glen Morgan; James Wong
- Production code: 4X05
- Original air date: November 3, 1996
- Running time: 44 minutes

Guest appearances
- Mitch Pileggi as Walter Skinner; Kristen Cloke as Melissa Riedal-Ephesian; Michael Dobson as BATF Agent; Michael Massee as Vernon Ephesian; Les Gallagher as Attorney; Dough Abrahams as Harbaugh; Donna White as Therapist; Anthony Harrison as Agent Riggins; Douglas Roy Dack as Mighty Man

Episode chronology
← Previous "Unruhe"	Next → "Sanguinarium"
- The X-Files season 4

"The Field Where I Died" is the fifth episode of the fourth season of the American science fiction television series The X-Files. It was written by Glen Morgan and James Wong, and directed by Rob Bowman. The episode originally aired in the United States on November 3, 1996, on the Fox network. It is a "Monster-of-the-Week" story, a stand-alone plot which is unconnected to the series' wider mythology. This episode earned a Nielsen rating of 12.3 and was seen by 19.85 million viewers upon its initial broadcast.

The show centers on FBI special agents Fox Mulder (David Duchovny) and Dana Scully (Gillian Anderson) who work on cases linked to the paranormal, called X-Files. In this episode, Mulder's search for an informant inside a cult compound leads him and Scully to one of the cult leader's wives. What they soon discover is an unexpectedly close connection with the woman involving reincarnation. Scully discovers that spirits inhabit living beings in order to tell their stories. After Mulder's regression scene, he details all of his past lives.

Morgan and Wong wrote the episode specifically for Kristen Cloke, who had previously been the protagonist of their science fiction series Space: Above and Beyond. The two also wanted to write an episode to challenge Duchovny as an actor. The installment was also inspired by Ken Burns' eponymous American Civil War documentary. "The Field Where I Died" received mixed to positive reviews from television critics, with many praising the episode's exploration of loss and grief as well as Cloke's acting. Others, however, felt that the episode was bogged down by its overemotional nature.

== Plot ==
In Apison, Tennessee, authorities receive a tip from someone named Sidney alleging child abuse and weapons possession by a local cult called the Temple of the Seven Stars. The FBI and ATF stage a raid on the Temple's compound, but are unable to find its leader, Vernon Ephesian (Michael Massee). Agent Fox Mulder (David Duchovny) experiences déjà vu and walks into a field on the compound, where he finds a trapdoor. Inside, he and Agent Dana Scully (Gillian Anderson) find Ephesian preparing to drink a red liquid with his six wives. Mulder stops them and handcuffs Ephesian, but he feels a strange connection to one of the wives, Melissa Riedal-Ephesian (Kristen Cloke).

Walter Skinner (Mitch Pileggi) warns the FBI and ATF that Ephesian and his wives will be released in a day unless they can track down Sidney and the Temple's reported weapons cache. The agents question Ephesian, who states that there is no member of the Temple named Sidney. When they interview Melissa, she suddenly begins to talk like Sidney, claiming that Harry Truman is president. Scully believes Melissa is exhibiting multiple personality disorder, but Mulder thinks she is recalling a past life. The agents take her back to the temple, where she takes on the personality of a woman from the Civil War period and says that the weapons were hidden in another secret bunker in the field. She also states that Mulder, in a past life, was a Confederate soldier in the field with her, was her beloved, and that she watched him die.

Mulder has Melissa undergo regression hypnosis so she can recount her past lives. She implies that she and Mulder have met over their past lives, always to be separated or lost to each other. To confirm her events, Mulder has himself hypnotized and recalls a time when he was a Jewish woman with a son, who had the same soul as his sister Samantha; his deceased father, who was Scully, is dead. Melissa was his husband in this life and had been taken to a Nazi concentration camp by a Gestapo officer who was The Smoking Man. Mulder also recalls his past life from the Civil War, when he was a man named Sullivan Biddle, while Melissa was Sarah Kavanaugh; Scully, Mulder claims, was his sergeant. Scully finds pictures of Biddle and Kavanaugh in the county's hall of records and gives them to Mulder. He wears a Confederate uniform in the photo.

The FBI and ATF plan to make another search of the compound. Ephesian, realizing that he will not survive another siege, passes out poison to the cult members while his men open fire on the FBI agents. All but he and Melissa die, Melissa having feigned drinking it. Mulder surrenders in order to get into the Temple. Ephesian then forces Melissa to drink the poison, and when Mulder arrives he finds both of them dead. Mulder caresses Melissa, looking out into the field.

== Production ==
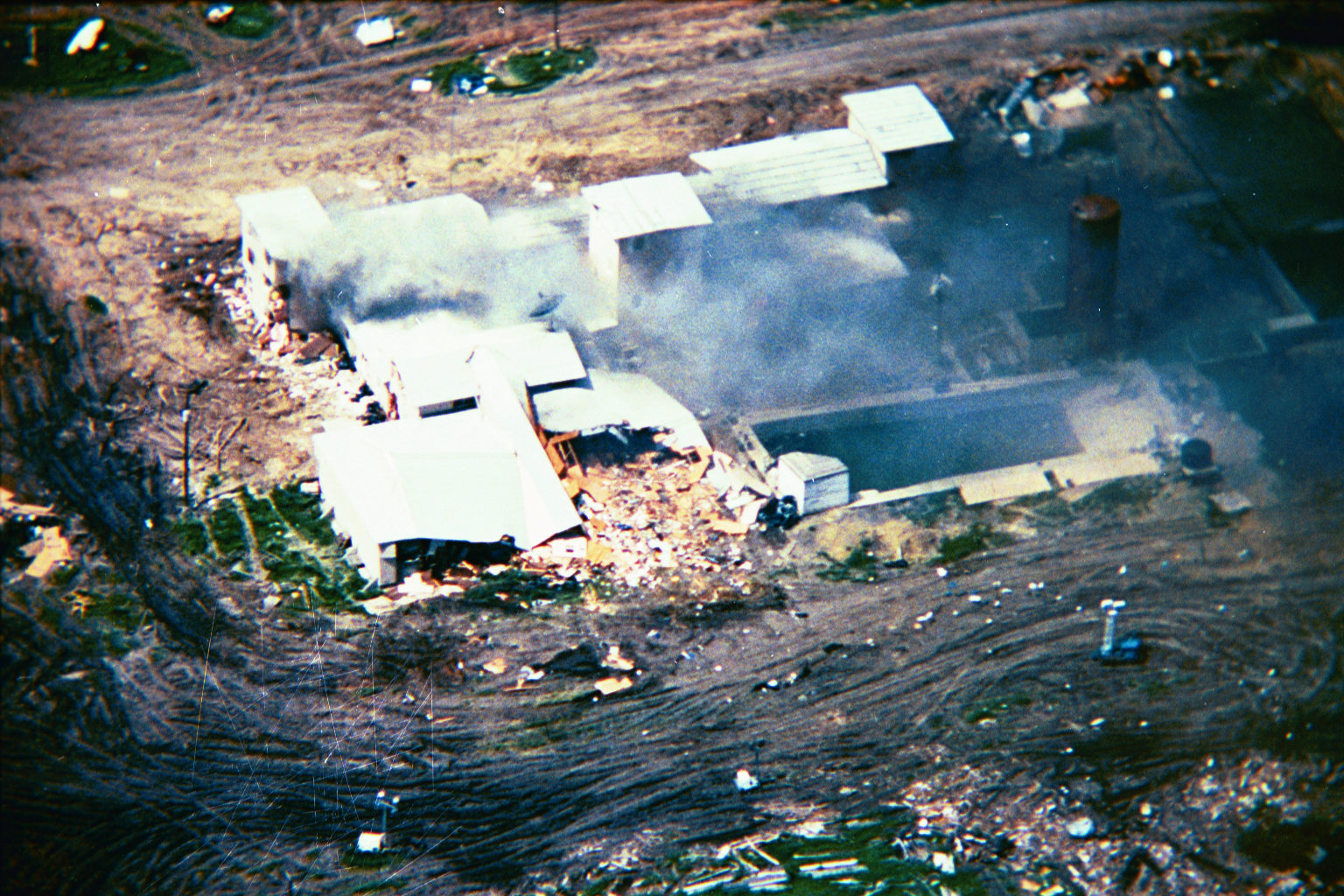
The penultimate scene has been compared to the Waco siege.

Episode writers Glen Morgan and James Wong developed "The Field Where I Died" specifically as a showcase for Kristen Cloke—the actress who played the protagonist from their short-lived Fox series Space: Above and Beyond. Morgan stated, "I knew she did a lot of characters and voices, so I wanted to incorporate that ... I wanted to write something for her that challenged her". To prepare for her role, Cloke researched dissociative identity disorder, and she based the many personality states that she plays on people that she knew. Morgan also stated that he "wanted to write something for David Duchovny that challenged him." When pitching the idea to director Rob Bowman, Morgan and Wong stated they wanted "this episode to feel like the part in Ken Burns' Civil War documentary where they read the Sullivan Ballou letter."

Michael Massee, the actor who played Vernon Ephesian, wanted his character to be "normal looking" and "nondemonic", explaining, "You have to believe that he believes his own rap. When he speaks, he's just explaining that 'this is the way it is' – and that's when it gets very scary." The name "Vernon" comes from the real name of Branch Davidian cult leader David Koresh (né Vernon Wayne Howell), whereas "Ephesian" is taken from the biblical Epistle to the Ephesians. Ephesian's Temple of the Seven Stars was built on a soundstage at North Shore Studios, and at the time was one of the show's most expensive sets.

To create an authentic looking citizen's registry, the show's props team reached out to officials at Apison, Tennessee, who lent them a genuine form, which was then carefully reproduced by the show's art staffers. The old photographs featured in the episode are "hybrids" of different freely-available photographs, which were "meld[ed]" together with the help of computers. The face used for Sullivan was chosen because it bore an "uncanny" resemblance to Mulder. The poem Mulder reads at the beginning and end is from Paracelsus by Robert Browning. The first cut of "The Field Where I Died" was over an hour long, resulting in eighteen minutes being cut; this resulted in removal of two of Melissa's personalities.

The episode bears several references to real cult activities of the period.

== Reception ==
=== Ratings ===
"The Field Where I Died" originally aired on the Fox network on November 3, 1996. This episode earned a Nielsen rating of 12.3, with an 18 share, meaning that roughly 12.3 percent of all television-equipped households, and 18 percent of households watching television, were tuned in to the episode. "The Field Where I Died" was seen by 19.85 million viewers on first broadcast.

=== Reviews ===
"The Field Where I Died" received mixed to positive reviews from critics. Zack Handlen of The A.V. Club gave "The Field Where I Died" a "B+". He felt that it worked "pretty well", but felt that "the episode isn't quite good enough for the conclusion to be as devastating as it should be". He also felt that it was not believable that Mulder quickly accepts his past lives and Melissa's part in it, and thought it would have worked better if he eased into believing it. Paula Vitaris from Cinefantastique gave the episode a largely positive review and awarded it three-and-a-half stars out of four. She called the entry "unabashedly emotional episode" that is "unafraid to plumb the depths of human loss and grief". Furthermore, Vitaris praised Cloke's acting; she called her "a truly gifted actor, slipping faultlessly into the skin of all of Melissa's personalities." She was, however, more critical of Duchovny, noting that his hypnosis scene was underacted.

Robert Shearman, in his book Wanting to Believe: A Critical Guide to The X-Files, Millennium & The Lone Gunmen, rated the episode three-a-half stars out of five and wrote that, while the episode "stumbles around a lot", it gives the viewer "the impression there's nothing else on TV quite like it". The author felt that the idea that Mulder and Scully were friends throughout their various lives was "one of the best things about the story". Shearman also wrote that the fact that Melissa and Mulder were somehow soul mates also prevented the story from being "obvious and pat". However, Shearman felt that Morgan and Wong added "a few too many ingredients" which yielded an uneven episode. Entertainment Weekly, on the other hand, was negative, giving the episode an "F" and describing it as "stultifyingly awful".

The episode is a favorite of Anderson's, who said she "loved the script" and that it made her cry. Series creator Chris Carter received angry calls after the Heaven's Gate, a UFO religion cult, committed mass suicide less than six months after the episode had aired. He declined to comment.

== Bibliography ==
- Meisler, Andy (1998). I Want to Believe: The Official Guide to the X-Files Volume 3. Harper Prism. ISBN 0061053864.
- Shearman, Robert (2009). Wanting to Believe: A Critical Guide to The X-Files, Millennium & The Lone Gunmen. Mad Norwegian Press. ISBN 978-0975944691.
