= Kristen Cloke =

American actress (active 1990– )

- Born: 1967 or 1968 (age 58–59); Van Nuys, Los Angeles, California, U.S.
- Occupations: Actress, writer
- Years active: 1990–present
- Spouse: Glen Morgan (m. 1998)
- Children: 2

Kristen Cloke (born 1967 or 1968) is an American actress and writer, best known for appearing in the television series Space: Above and Beyond as a leading character and her leading role in Final Destination as Val Lewton.

== Early life and education ==
Kristen Cloke was born in the Van Nuys section of Los Angeles and attended California State University, Northridge. She considered acting a hobby while she majored in English there.

== Acting career and television ==
Cloke's first feature film role was as Christine, the female lead in Megaville (1990), alongside Billy Zane. Cloke's other credits include lead parts in Fugitive Rage and A Part of the Family. She has also had featured roles in Stay Tuned, Mistress, and The Marrying Man. Cloke's television credits include: Winnetka Road as Maybeth, Silk Stalkings as Annie Overstreet, and guest appearances on One West Waikiki, Cheers, Mad About You, Dear John, Murder, She Wrote, Quantum Leap, Doogie Howser, M.D., and Vengeance Unlimited.

In 1995, Cloke's breakout role came as Captain Shane Autumn Vansen on Space: Above and Beyond. The series was cancelled after one season, but it led to her casting as Melissa, a guest role in The X-Files fourth season episode "The Field Where I Died", which was written for her. To prepare for her role, she researched dissociative identity disorder, and she based the many personality states that she plays on people that she knew. She later described the episode as a love letter between herself and producer Glen Morgan, her then fiancé (now husband). She played the recurring role of Dr. Lara Means in the second season of Millennium.

In 2000, Cloke starred as Valerie Lewton in the film Final Destination. She also appeared in a 2017 episode of Lore and the 2017 film Lady Bird.

== Filmography ==
=== Film ===
Year	Title	Role	Notes
1990	Megaville	Christine	
1991	The Marrying Man	Louise	
1991	Fugitive Rage	Kristen	a.k.a. Caged Fear
1992	Stay Tuned	Velma	as Kristin Cloke
1997	The Rage	Kelly McCord	
1999	The 13th Warrior	Wendol Mother	Uncredited
2000	Final Destination	Valerie Lewton	
2003	Willard	Psychiatrist	Uncredited
2006	Black Christmas	Leigh Colvin	
2011	Magnificat	Lynn's Mother	Short film; voice role
2014	Tips	Nancy Graffin	Short film
2017	Lady Bird	Ms. Steffans	

=== Television ===
Year	Title	Role	Notes
1990	Sydney	Suzanne	Episode: "She Loves Me"
1991	Going Places	Krysten	Episode: "Room to Move"
1992	Silk Stalkings	Annie Overstreet	3 episodes
1992	Dear John	Annette	Episode: "Who's Who"
1992	Doogie Howser, M.D.	Suzanne Rodgers	Episode: "Look Ma, No Pants"
1992	Quantum Leap	Shirley Constantine	Episode: "Deliver Us from Evil"
1993	Cheers	Shauna	Episode: "Sunday Dinner"
1993	Mother of the Bride	Francine	Television film
1993	Diagnosis Murder	Josie Swanson	2 episodes
1994	Winnetka Road	MayBeth Serlin	Main cast (6 episodes)
1994	A Part of the Family	Gina	Television film
1994	One West Waikiki	Wendy Cochran	Episode: "Terminal Island"
1994	Mad About You	The Salesperson	Episode: "When I'm Sixty-Four"
1994	Murder, She Wrote	Emma Kemp	Episode: "Dear Deadly"
1995	ABC Afterschool Specials	Amanda	Episode: "Long Road Home"
1995–1996	Space: Above and Beyond	Captain Shane Vansen	Main cast (23 episodes)
1996	The X-Files	Melissa Rydell Ephesian	Episode: "The Field Where I Died"
1997–1998	Millennium	Lara Means	10 episodes
1998	Vengeance Unlimited	Harrington/Tamara Simpson	Episode: "Noir"
2000	The Others	Allison / The Woman	2 episodes
2001	Felicity	Rabbi Marisa Levin	Episode: "Senioritis"
2009	Men of a Certain Age	Beth	Episode: "Pilot"
2011	Pretty Little Liars	Susan	Episode: "Careful What U Wish 4"
2017	Lore	Dr. Marjorie Freeman	Episode: "Echoes"
2018	The X-Files	Wendy (voice)	Episode: "Rm9sbG93ZXJz"

=== Writer ===
Year	Title	Notes
2014	Intruders	Episodes: "Bound" and "There Is No End"
2018	The X-Files	Episode: "Rm9sbG93ZXJz" (co-writer)
2023	Almost Paradise	Episode: "All In"
