= James Wong (filmmaker) =

American film and television director, screenwriter and producer

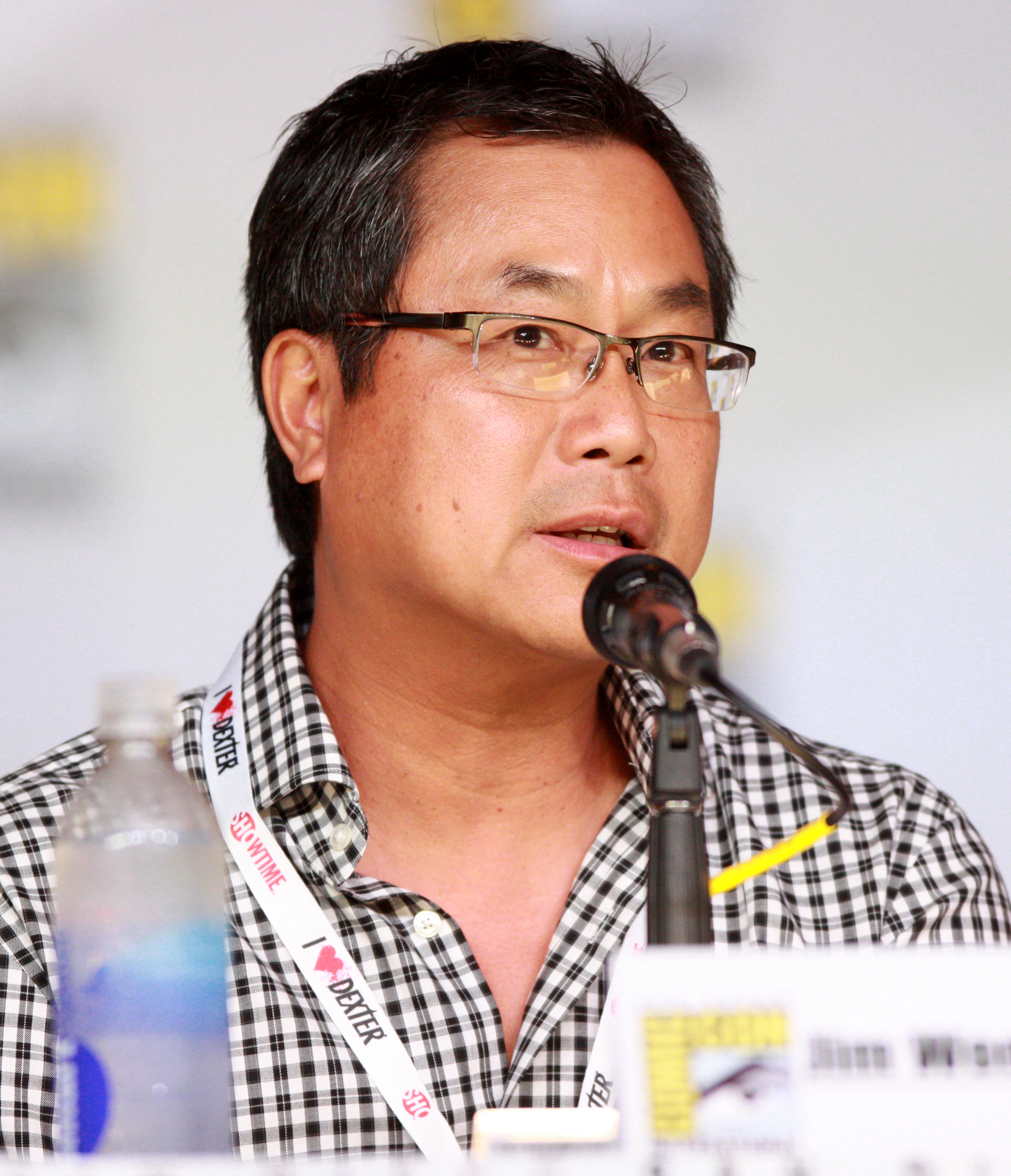
- Wong at San Diego Comic-Con in 2013
- Born: April 20, 1959 (age 67); Hong Kong
- Occupations: Film and television director, screenwriter, producer

James Wong (born April 20, 1959) is an American film and television director, screenwriter and producer born in Hong Kong. He collaborated with Glen Morgan on series including The X-Files and Space: Above and Beyond. His feature films as director include Final Destination, The One, Final Destination 3 and Dragonball Evolution.

== Early life and education ==
Wong moved from Hong Kong to the United States with his family at the age of ten. He met Morgan while attending high school in El Cajon, near San Diego. Both attended Loyola Marymount University in Los Angeles. Wong initially studied engineering before switching to film after seeing Apocalypse Now. After college, they worked as production assistants for producer Sandy Howard and began writing screenplays together.

== Television ==
=== Work with Glen Morgan ===
Wong worked as a writer and story editor on 21 Jump Street and Booker. He also served as a supervising producer on Wiseguy and The Commish, and as a story editor on Knightwatch. In 1991, he also worked on The 100 Lives of Black Jack Savage.

Wong and Morgan joined Chris Carter's The X-Files in 1993. Their episodes included "Squeeze", "Beyond the Sea", "E.B.E.", "Little Green Men" and "One Breath", and their work introduced characters including Walter Skinner and The Lone Gunmen. Following a four-year, $8 million agreement with Fox, they developed Space: Above and Beyond, which aired in 1995–1996.

After that series ended, they returned to the fourth season of The X-Files, combining it with writing for Millennium. Their work included "Home", the first episode of the series to carry a parental advisory from the network. Wong made his television directing debut with the 1996 episode "Musings of a Cigarette Smoking Man". Wong and Morgan subsequently took charge of Millennium and later served as executive producers on The Others.

=== Later television work ===
Wong directed for Tower Prep and worked as a writer, director and co-executive producer on The Event. He was also a writer and producer on American Horror Story, receiving Emmy nominations as a co-executive or executive producer for several of its seasons.

In 2014, he co-wrote the miniseries Rosemary's Baby. For the revival of The X-Files, he wrote and directed "Founder's Mutation", broadcast in 2016, and "Ghouli", broadcast in 2018. In 2018, he also directed "Nothing Lasts Forever", written by Karen Nielsen. His later credits include consulting producer on neXt, writing for Almost Paradise, and writing and directing for 9-1-1. He directed the latter series' 2024 episode "Buzzkill".

== Film ==
Wong and Morgan wrote The Boys Next Door, directed by Penelope Spheeris. The film is identified as a 1985 production; the AFI Catalog dates its American theatrical release to 1986.

Wong made his feature directing debut with Final Destination (2000), co-writing the screenplay with Morgan and Jeffrey Reddick. The project originated as an unsolicited X-Files script by Reddick, which Wong and Morgan reworked as a feature. He followed it with The One (2001), a science-fiction action film starring Jet Li, which he also co-wrote with Morgan.

He produced Willard (2003), written and directed by Morgan. Wong returned to the Final Destination series as director, co-writer and producer of Final Destination 3 (2006). That year, he also produced Black Christmas, for which Morgan wrote the screenplay and directed. In 2009, Wong directed Dragonball Evolution, written by Ben Ramsey. The adaptation received predominantly negative reviews from critics.

=== Approach to horror ===
For Final Destination, Wong and Morgan chose to keep Death as an unseen force rather than a visible antagonist. Danger arises from everyday objects and chains of events. Reddick told The Advocate that this differed from his earlier draft, in which Death eventually took physical form. In a 2025 interview, Wong described working with those sequences to establish and then subvert the audience's expectations.

== Personal life ==
Wong has three children, including twins. He attended the Los Angeles premiere of Final Destination 3 in February 2006 with his wife Teena and their daughter Taylor.

== Filmography ==
The table lists roles confirmed by the cited sources.

Year	Film	Role
1985	The Boys Next Door	Screenwriter
2000	Final Destination	Director and co-screenwriter
2001	The One	Director and co-screenwriter
2003	Willard	Producer
2006	Final Destination 3	Director, co-screenwriter and producer
2006	Black Christmas	Producer
2009	Dragonball Evolution	Director

== Emmy nominations ==
The Television Academy lists six Primetime Emmy nominations for Wong.

Year	Production	Category	Role
1995	The X-Files	Outstanding Drama Series	Co-executive producer
1997	The X-Files	Outstanding Drama Series	Consulting producer
1997	The X-Files	Outstanding Directing for a Drama Series	Director
2013	American Horror Story: Asylum	Outstanding Miniseries or Movie	Co-executive producer
2014	American Horror Story: Coven	Outstanding Miniseries	Co-executive producer
2015	American Horror Story: Freak Show	Outstanding Limited Series	Executive producer
