= Greater Antillean oriole =

The Greater Antillean oriole was split into 4 species in 2010:

- Bahama oriole
- Cuban oriole
- Hispaniolan oriole
- Puerto Rican oriole
