= Gregory Itzin =

American actor (1948–2022)

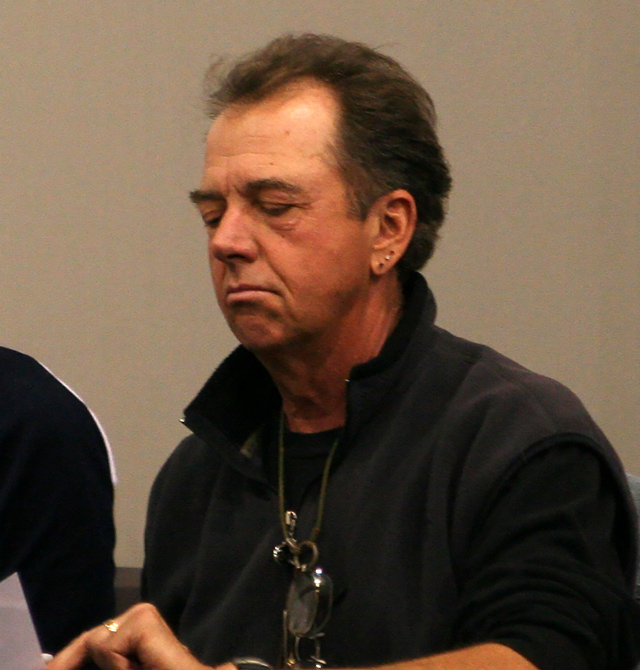
- Itzin in 2006
- Born: Gregory Martin Itzin; April 20, 1948; Washington, D.C., U.S.
- Died: July 8, 2022 (aged 74)
- Occupation: Actor
- Years active: 1979–2022
- Spouse: Judie (m. 1979)
- Children: 2

Gregory Martin Itzin (April 20, 1948 – July 8, 2022) was an American character actor of film and television best known for his role as U.S. President Charles Logan in the action thriller series 24.

== Early life ==
Itzin was born in Washington, D.C., the son of Evelyn Loretta (née Smith) and Martin Joseph Itzin. When he was in sixth grade, his family moved to Burlington, Wisconsin, where his father was mayor. Itzin originally intended to become a theater actor, receiving training at the American Conservatory Theater in San Francisco. He acted on many stages across the country.

== Career ==
=== Television ===
Itzin first appeared on television as a contestant on Whew! in 1979, then in guest starring roles on various television shows like in the MacGyver episode "Final Approach" (1986). He received a Tony Award nomination for his role in the Pulitzer Prize–winning play The Kentucky Cycle. In the movie Airplane!, Itzin played Religious Zealot #1. He had a small role in The A-Team episode "Wheel of Fortune" as Howard, an accountant at a casino.

In 2005, Itzin joined the cast of 24, halfway through its fourth season, in the recurring role as Vice President Charles Logan. By the following season the character had become President and was expanded to become one of the leading figures in the storyline. Itzin received an Emmy nomination for Outstanding Supporting Actor in a Drama Series for this performance. He didn't have to audition for the role, since he had previously auditioned for a role during the second season of the show, and knew one of the producers. Itzin returned for four episodes in season six. Itzin returned for a story arc during the eighth season of the show to help President Allison Taylor keep the Peace Treaty alive. This resulted in an Emmy nomination for Outstanding Guest Actor in a Drama Series. Somewhat coincidentally, before this role, Itzin played a Presidential Candidate in a commercial for cheese products, who was deemed a "doofus" for not liking cheese.

In 2007, he made a guest appearance as William Adama, Dick Tracy, and a police officer at Randy's Halloween night in an episode of Robot Chicken.

Itzin has held recurring roles on popular TV series such as Friends as Theodore Hannigan, father of Mike Hannigan, Murder One, NCIS, and The Mentalist. He played the head of the unit in the latter for 13 episodes, before leaving to return to 24 for its final season. Itzin also appeared on Night Court, Matlock, Diagnosis: Murder, Jake and the Fatman, The O.C., Beverly Hills, 90210, Judging Amy, Boston Legal, CSI: Crime Scene Investigation, The Practice, The Pretender and the short-lived science fiction series, Firefly. He also portrayed John Ashcroft in the 2003 television movie DC 9/11: Time of Crisis. He had a recurring role on Covert Affairs.

Itzin made his first Star Trek appearance in 1993, in the Star Trek: Deep Space Nine episode "Dax". He became a frequent Star Trek actor, playing five different roles in the various series over the years, and guest starred on DS9 again in the sixth-season episode "Who Mourns for Morn?". He appeared as Doctor Dysek in the episode "Critical Care" in the 7th season of Star Trek: Voyager. His most recent Trek role was Admiral Black in Star Trek: Enterprise.

Itzin was a special guest star on the Disney Channel hit show Hannah Montana in the season two episode "Test of My Love" as a billionaire whose son becomes a romantic interest of Miley's. He hosted ACME: This Week! at the ACME Comedy Theatre on February 23, 2008, appearing in several sketches as well as a short film, "Law and Order: Really Special Victims Unit". Itzin had a recurring role in seasons 1–4 of USA Network's series, Covert Affairs.

=== Theater ===
On stage, he appeared in numerous theatrical venues across the country. Itzin was a member of the Antaeus Theatre Company in Los Angeles. He was also a member of the Matrix Theatre Company in Los Angeles, where he acted in award-winning productions of Waiting for Godot, The Homecoming, and The Birthday Party (each earning him an L.A. Drama Critics Circle Award for performance). For his work in the Pulitzer Prize-winning The Kentucky Cycle — which he performed in the world premiere at the Intiman Theatre, Mark Taper Forum, the Kennedy Center, and on Broadway — he received Tony Award and Drama Desk Award nominations.

He appeared on stage as Louis de Rougemont in the world premiere of Donald Margulies' Shipwrecked! An Entertainment at South Coast Repertory, and subsequently revived at the Geffen Playhouse.

In 2010, he appeared as the Earl of Kent in the Antaeus Company's production of King Lear. He won the L.A. Drama Critics Circle Award for this performance.

He was in several radio plays with The L.A. Theatre Works, and played the Archbishop in the Hollywood Theater of the Ear's 2010 audio production of Saint Joan.

=== Film ===
Itzin starred in Fear and Loathing in Las Vegas as a Mint Hotel clerk, who looked and sounded a lot like actor McLean Stevenson on M*A*S*H. He played a psychiatrist in the Lindsay Lohan thriller I Know Who Killed Me and as a prison warden in Law Abiding Citizen. His final film role was as James Bond (ornithologist) in the 2022 British documentary The Other Fellow.

== Personal life, health and death ==
Itzin and his wife, Judie, whom he married in 1979, had two children.

Itzin had a "major heart attack" in 2015, but was able to continue acting. He died on July 8, 2022, at the age of 74 due to complications during an emergency surgery.

== Filmography ==
=== Film ===
Year	Title	Role	Notes
1980	Airplane!	Religious Zealot #1	
1982	The Best Little Whorehouse in Texas	Melvin's Crew	
1982	Airplane II: The Sequel	Young Man	Uncredited
1984	Hard to Hold	Owen	
1985	Teen Wolf	English Teacher	
1989	The Fabulous Baker Boys	Vince Nancy	
1989	Dad	Ralph Kramer	
1989	How to Get... Revenge	Officer P.F.	Uncredited
1993	Young Goodman Brown	George Burroughs	
1995	Born to Be Wild	Walter Mallinson	
1998	Fear and Loathing in Las Vegas	Clerk at Mint Hotel	
1999	One Last Flight	Joe	
1999	Making Contact	Hans	
2000	What's Cooking?	James Moore	
2000	Boys Life 3	Scott's Father	
2001	Evolution	Barry Cartwright	
2001	Original Sin	Colonel Worth	
2002	Life or Something Like It	Dennis	
2002	Igby Goes Down	Eulogist #2	Uncredited
2002	Adaptation	Prosecutor	
2007	I Know Who Killed Me	Dr. Greg Jameson	
2008	Float	Ray Fulton	
2009	Law Abiding Citizen	Warden Iger	
2009	The Job	Mr. D	
2010	Autopilot	Dr. Brian	
2011	L.A., I Hate You	George	
2011	The Change-Up	Flemming Steel	
2011	The Ides of March	Jack Stearns	
2012	Lincoln	John Archibald Campbell	
2014	Small Time	Lennie	
2016	Sensitivity Training	Barry	
2018	Ice: The Movie	Joe Grantham	
2022	The Other Fellow	James Bond (ornithologist)	

=== Television ===
Year	Title	Role	Notes
1979	Whew!	Himself (contestant)	Episode 119
1979	Backstairs at the White House	White House Tour Guide	Episode #1.1
1979	Mork & Mindy	Man #2	Episode: "Dr. Morkenstein"
1979	Charlie's Angels	Waiter	Episode: "Fallen Angel"
1981	Thornwell	Polygraph Tester	Television film
1981	Murder in Texas	Newsman	Television film
1981	Bulba	V. Ogelthorpe	Television film
1982	Fame	Dr. Reston	Episode: "To Soar and Never Falter"
1982	Lou Grant	Young Reporter	Episode: "Unthinkable"
1982, 1983	Voyagers!	Ernst / Davis	2 episodes
1983	American Playhouse	Goldsmith	Episode: "Miss Lonelyhearts"
1983	The Other Woman	Mario	Television film
1985	Street Hawk	Harvey	Episode: "Vegas Run"
1985	Falcon Crest	Dr. Bitters	Episode: "The Trial"
1985	Santa Barbara	Attorney Howard Otis	3 episodes
1985	Scarecrow and Mrs. King	Paul Cavanaugh	Episode: "You Only Die Twice"
1985	Tales from the Darkside	Newton	Episode: "Grandma's Last Wish"
1985	Hunter	Charlie Latimer	Episode: "The Biggest Man in Town"
1985	Hill Street Blues	Dr. Kaplan	Episode: "Seoul on Ice"
1985	Hotel	Ed Banner	Episode: "Echoes"
1986	The A-Team	Howard	Episode: "Wheel of Fortune"
1986	Easy Street	Mr. Haskell	Episode: "Pride Goeth Before a Cheap Hotel"
1986	MacGyver	Tom Cavanaugh	Episode: "Final Approach"
1986	St. Elsewhere	Ving Shalimar	Episode: "Lost Weekend"
1987	Outlaws	Art Collier	Episode: "Hymn"
1987	Max Headroom	Gregory	Episode: "Deities"
1987	Frank's Place	Brandon	Episode: "Season's Greetings"
1987–1992	Matlock	Various	5 episodes
1987–1994	L.A. Law	D.A. Jack Angeletti	3 episodes
1988	21 Jump Street	Principal Jack Garner	Episode: "Brother Hanson & the Miracle of Renner's Pond"
1988	A Year in the Life	Joel	Episode: "Love Mother"
1988	Something Is Out There	Dr. Wilcher	Episode: "Gladiator"
1989	Knots Landing	Val's Lawyer	Episode: "A Grave Misunderstanding"
1989	Jesse Hawkes	Frank Keith	Episode: "Eddy Street"
1989	The Nutt House	Dennis	10 episodes
1989–1991	Night Court	Mugger / Warren Karr	2 episodes
1989–1992	Empty Nest	Judge Russell / Bill Wallace / Frank	3 episodes
1990	Murphy Brown	Gil Porter	Episode: "On the Road Again"
1990	Head of the Class	Meriner	Episode: "Cement Hi-Tops"
1990	Coach	Tom	Episode: "Hayden's in the Kitchen with Dinah"
1990	Over My Dead Body	Cosby / Crosby	3 episodes
1991	Gabriel's Fire	Evan Stahl	Episode: "A Prayer for the Goldsteins"
1991	Jake and the Fatman	Dr. Mike Summers	Episode: "Dr. Mike Summers"
1991	Dark Justice	Sterling Pope	Episode: "What Comes Around"
1991	DEA	Sam Blankenship	Episode: "The Fat Lady Sings Alone"
1991	Hi Honey – I'm Dead	Phil	Television film
1991	Homefront	Allan Carmichael	Episode: "Man, This Joint Is Jumping"
1991–1992	Eerie, Indiana	The Mayor	4 episodes
1992	Davis Rules	Host	Episode: "Love at First Sighting: Part 2"
1992	Bodies of Evidence	Phillip Montgomery	Episode: "Time Served"
1992	Civil Wars	Tom Turnbull	2 episodes
1992	Beverly Hills, 90210	Father Chris	Episode: "Destiny Rides Again"
1993	Major Dad	Mitch Hewitt	Episode: "Come Rain or Come Shine"
1993	Shaky Ground	Repairman	Episode: "Asbestos and Costello"
1993	Quantum Leap	Sam Phillips	Episode: "Memphis Melody – July 3, 1954"
1993	Donato and Daughter	Cornell	Television film
1993	Moment of Truth: Stalking Back	Rick Boyer	Television film
1993, 1998	Star Trek: Deep Space Nine	Hain / Ilon Tandro	Episodes: "Who Mourns for Morn?"; "Dax"
1994	Dave's World	Alvin	Episode: "The Funeral"
1994	Picket Fences	Michael Kramer	2 episodes
1994–1995	Something Wilder	Jack Travis	15 episodes
1995	The Client	George Sherman	Episode: "The Burning of Atlanta"
1995	Strange Luck	Ted Glenn	Episode: "Hat Trick"
1995	Murder, She Wrote	Ralph Brewer	Episode: "Frozen Stiff"
1995–1996	Murder One	D.A. Roger Garfield	17 episodes
1996	ER	Burn Doctor	Episode: "The Healers"
1996	Chicago Hope	Dr. Kyle Mitchell	Episode: "Sexual Perversity in Chicago Hope"
1996	Arliss	Tom Gale	Episode: "The Client's Best Interest"
1996	Diagnosis: Murder	Andrew King	2 episodes
1996, 1998	Caroline in the City	Hank Parsons / Mr. Lepner	Episodes: "Caroline and the Kid"; "Caroline and the Diva"
1997	Friends 'Til the End	Mr. Romley	Television film
1997	The Pretender	Phil Campbell	Episode: "Jaroldo!"
1997	Millennium	Hans Ingram	Episode: "Walkabout"
1997	JAG	Undersecretary of State Lawrence Culbertson	Episode: "Above and Beyond"
1997	Players	Quentin Belkey	Episode: "Three of a Con"
1997–2003	The Practice	Various	5 episodes
1998	Suddenly Susan	Bob	Episode: "Car Trouble"
1998	The Day Lincoln Was Shot	Mr. Crook	Television film
1998	The Closer	Larry Colburn	Episode: "My Best Friend's Funeral"
1998	C-16: FBI	Royce Bender	Episode: "Green Card"
1998	Any Day Now	Councilman Emmett Kearn	Episode: "No Comment"
1998	Brother's Keeper	Mr. Weaver	Episode: "Who's Your Daddy?"
1999	V.I.P.	Ronnie Beeman	Episode: "Midnight in the Garden of Ronnie Beeman"
1999	Party of Five	School Psychologist	2 episodes
1999	The Hunt for the Unicorn Killer	Arlen Specter	Television film
1999	Johnny Tsunami	Headmaster Pritchard	Television film
1999	Wasteland	Max Brody	Episode: "Double Date"
1999	Early Edition	Bruce Bryce	Episode: "Camera Shy"
1999	It's Like, You Know...	Chuck	2 episodes
2000	Family Law	Mr. Allero	Episode: "Media Relations"
2000	Profiler	Joel Marks	6 episodes
2000	Bull	Lloyd Styner	Episode: "What the Past Will Bring"
2000	Star Trek: Voyager	Dr. Dysek	Episode: "Critical Care"
2000	The Michael Richards Show	Matty Stillman	Episode: "It's Only Personal"
2000–2001	Strip Mall	Sergei	21 episodes
2001	CSI: Crime Scene Investigation	Norman Stirling	Episode: "Boom"
2001–2005	Judging Amy	ASA Ethan Donahue	3 episodes
2002	Wolf Lake	Gerald Carter	Episode: "Leader of the Pack"
2002	Philly	Paul Cabretti	Episode: "Thanks for the Mammaries"
2002	The West Wing	State Dept. Representative	Episode: "Enemies Foreign and Domestic"
2002	For the People	Judge Donald Kingman	Episode: "The Double Standard"
2002	Firefly	Magistrate Higgins	Episode: "Jaynestown"
2002	NYPD Blue	Martin Walsh	Episode: "Healthy McDowell Movement"
2002–2004	Friends	Theodore Hannigan	2 episodes
2002, 2005	Star Trek: Enterprise	Adm. Black / Capt. Sopek	Episodes: "In a Mirror, Darkly Part II"; "Shadows of P'Jem"
2003	Without a Trace	Sydney's co-worker	Episode: "Fallout: Part 1"
2003	DC 9/11: Time of Crisis	John Ashcroft	Television film
2003	The Lyon's Den	Mr. Thomas	Episode: "The Other Side of Caution"
2003, 2020	NCIS	Director Charlie / Spencer Downing	3 episodes
2004	Medical Investigation	Howard Lewson	Episode: "Progeny"
2004	The O.C.	Stephen Herbert	Episode: "The New Era"
2005	Crossing Jordan	Andrew Helm	Episode: "Gray Murders"
2005	Boston Legal	A.D.A. Todd Milken	2 episodes
2005–2010	24	Charles Logan	45 episodes Nominated — Screen Actors Guild Award for Outstanding Performance by an Ensemble in a Drama Series (2007)
2007	Robot Chicken	William Adama / Dick Tracy / Police Officer	Episode: "Rabbits on a Roller Coaster"
2007	Nice Girls Don't Get the Corner Office	Stone	Television film
2008	Medium	Senator Jed Garrity	Episode: "Aftertaste"
2008	Hannah Montana	William Harris	Episode: "The Test of My Love"
2008–2012	The Mentalist	Virgil Minelli	15 episodes
2010	Proposition 8 Trial Re-Enactment	David Blankenhorn	Television documentary
2010–2013	Covert Affairs	Henry Wilcox	25 episodes
2011	Big Love	Senator Dwyer	9 episodes
2011	Desperate Housewives	Dick Barrows	2 episodes
2013	Once Upon a Time	Alphonse Frankenstein	Episode: "In the Name of the Brother"
2013	Mob City	Mayor Fletcher Bowron	6 episodes
2015	Hawaii Five-0	Alex Mackey	Episode: "Poina 'ole"
2016	12 Deadly Days	Grandpa	Episode: "Love Bites"
2018	Code Black	Dr. David Stoval	Episode: "Hell's Heart"
2018	America 2.0	President Ward Baker	Episode: "Ice"
2019	The Resident	Sunflower	Episode: "The Unbefriended"
