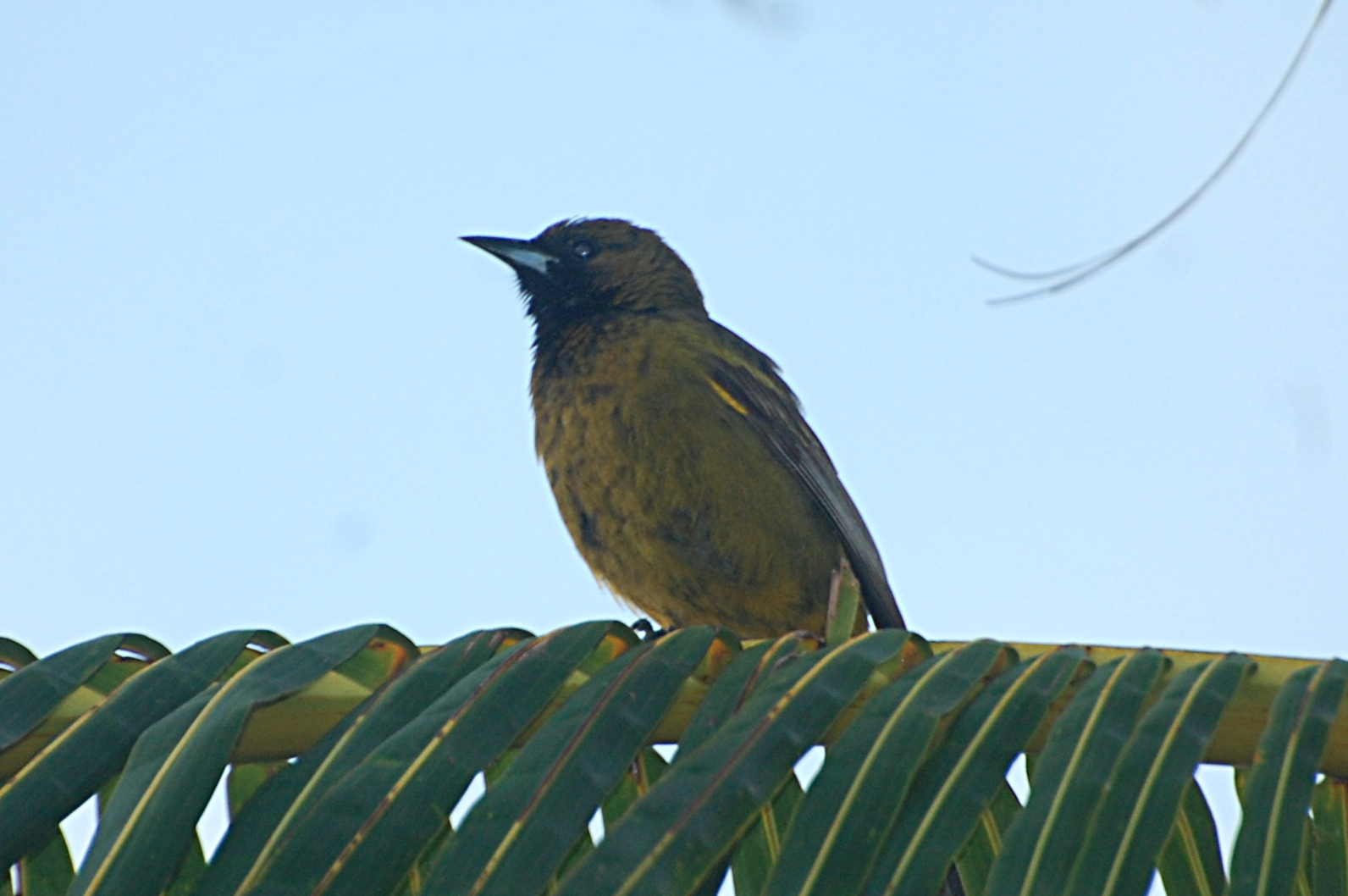
- Juvenile

Conservation status
- Least Concern (IUCN 3.1)

Scientific classification
- Kingdom: Animalia
- Phylum: Chordata
- Class: Aves
- Order: Passeriformes
- Family: Icteridae
- Genus: Icterus
- Species: I. melanopsis

Binomial name
- Icterus melanopsis (Wagler, 1829)

= Cuban oriole =

Species of songbird

The Cuban oriole (Icterus melanopsis) is a species of songbird in the family Icteridae. It is endemic to Cuba.

Adults measure 20 cm (7.9 in) long with a 10 cm (3.9 in) wing length. They are black with yellow patches on the shoulders, underwings, rump and undertail. Sexes are alike. Juvenile birds are olive while immature birds are olive with a black face and throat.

The taxon was formerly lumped with Bahama orioles (Icterus northropi), Hispaniolan orioles (Icterus dominicensis), and Puerto Rican orioles (Icterus portoricensis) into a single species known as the Greater Antillean oriole (Note: These four species were lumped as the Greater Antillean oriole, which itself was previously lumped with the Central American black-cowled oriole.) until all four birds were elevated to full species status in 2010.

Its natural habitats are subtropical or tropical dry forests, subtropical or tropical moist lowland forests, subtropical or tropical mangrove forests, and plantations.

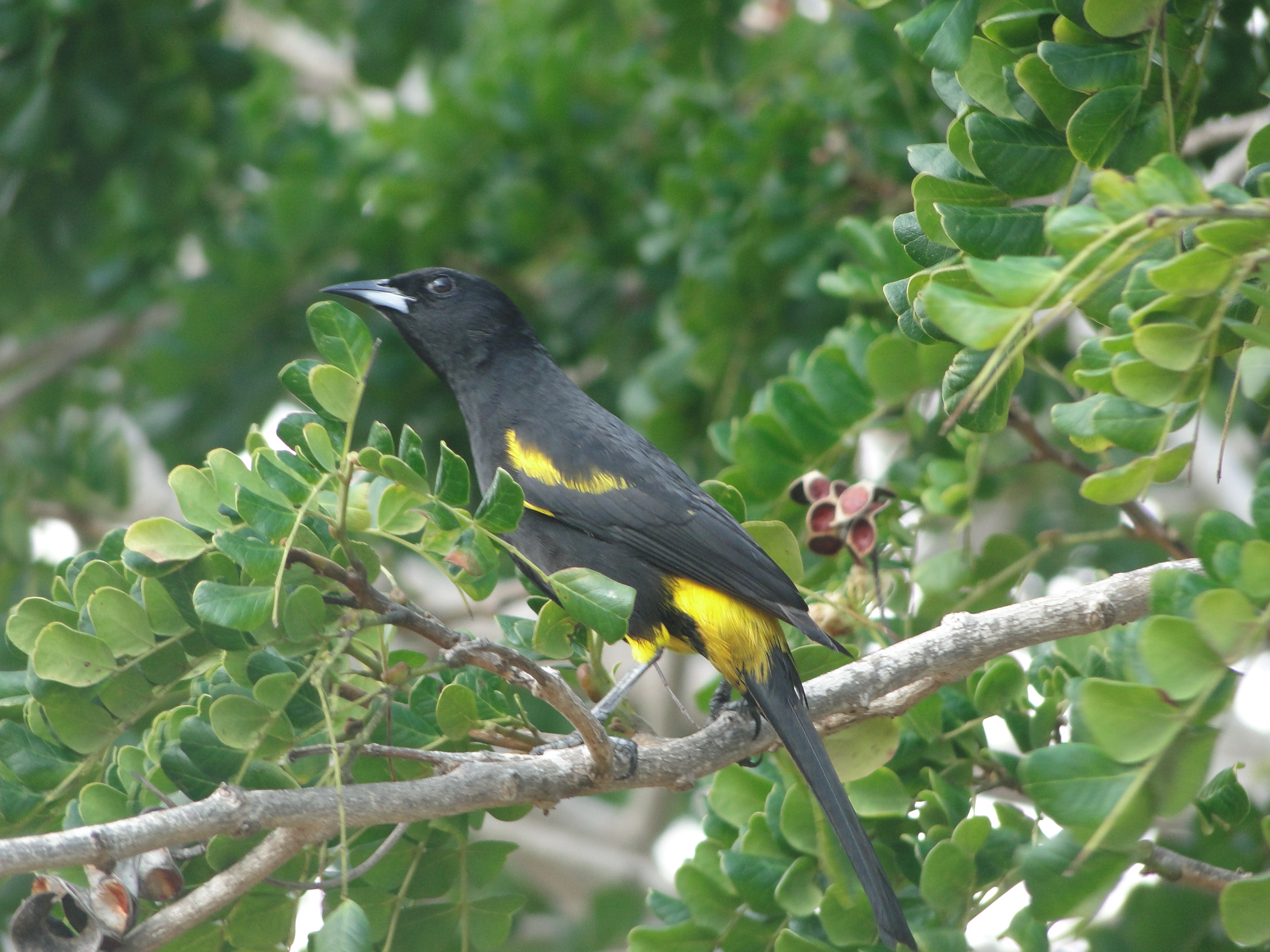
Adult bird in Cayo Coco

== History ==
In 1890, Allen documented Cuban, Bahama, Hispaniolan, and Puerto Rican orioles as four distinct species. In 1936, James Bond classified the four orioles as one species, the Greater Antillean oriole, in his most famous and influential book "Birds of the West Indies." Though the book became very popular among birders and ornithologists alike, Bond's grouping of Greater Antillean orioles was reverted in 2010 when the American Ornithologist's Union once again split them up into 4 species. This reversal of Bond's longstanding claim came in light of new evidence which displayed significant DNA, plumage, and song differences between the 4 birds. This DNA evidence also led to the additional conclusion that the Cuban oriole and Bahama oriole were close sister taxa.

== Habitat ==
=== Range ===
Cuban orioles are endemic to the island of Cuba and the neighboring Isla de la Juventud.

=== Habitat ===
Cuban orioles are able to survive in a wide variety of habitat conditions present throughout Cuba. These include plantations, dense forests, and human settlements. The birds are frequently observed foraging in coral trees for insects and nectar, and tend to attach nests to the underside of palm tree leaves.

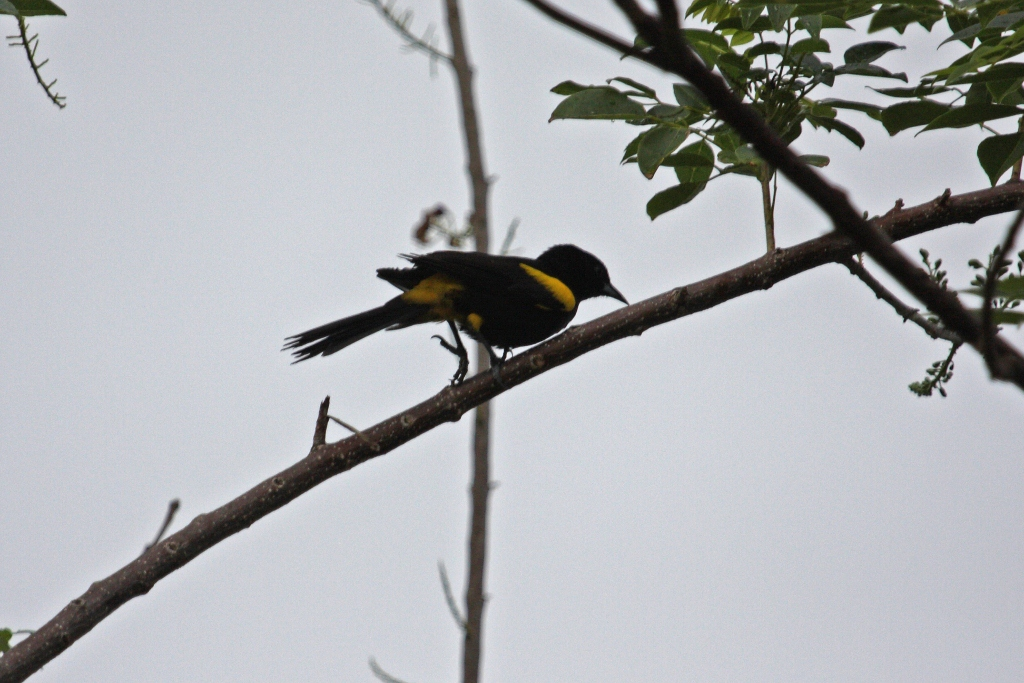
Adult bird showing yellow patches

== Physical traits ==
Adult Cuban orioles are black with a blue grey patch on the lower mandible and yellow patches on the coverts, rump, and upper thigh. The appearance of Cuban orioles is similar to that of Bahama, Puerto Rican, and Hispaniolan orioles; a fact which contributed to the four birds being grouped into one species. Cuban orioles have the darkest coloration of the Greater Antillean orioles despite the fact that its closest relative, the Bahama oriole, displays the most yellow out of the same group.

Like many other orioles such as Bahama and the orchard orioles, Cuban orioles show delayed plumage maturation. This means that their juvenile plumage is not the same as their sexually mature adult plumage. When leaving the nest, the juvenile plumage of Cuban orioles is mostly olive. Yearling plumage is similar to the fledgling plumage but with black feathers around the throat and beak.

Along with most other tropical orioles, the Cuban oriole has very little sexual dimorphism due to the fact that male and female Cuban orioles look very similar and it is likely impossible to confirm their sex without testing their DNA.

== Diet ==
The Cuban oriole is omnivorous and capable of eating insects, soft fruit, and nectar from sources such as banana trees, citrus trees, and coral trees. Though the majority of the Cuban oriole diet consists of insects, they can also act as nectar robbers. When eating nectar, the Cuban oriole will create an opening under the flower and consume nectar through this opening instead of through the flower itself. As a result, the Cuban oriole takes the plant's nectar without contributing to pollination.

== Reproduction ==
=== Nesting ===
Cuban orioles are nesting songbirds and, along with some other tropical orioles, may pair with one mate for the rest of their lives. From February to July Cuban orioles build hanging nests similar to baskets out of material from palm and banana tree leaves. Clutch sizes are typically three greenish-white eggs with grey or olive spots and scrawl. Similar to most tropical orioles, Cuban oriole pairs may maintain a year-round territory and will defend their nest from predators.

=== Birdsong ===
Cuban orioles are songbirds and are capable of producing birdsong. Though it has not been observed in Cuban orioles, male and female song has been observed in the Bahama and Puerto Rican orioles as well as most tropical songbirds. Therefore, it is likely that Cuban oriole males and females are capable of singing but further study is required before this can be confirmed.

The long song of the Cuban oriole is approximately three seconds with 11–12 notes and its short song is two seconds with 5–6 notes. The call of the Cuban oriole is a sharp chip then a nasal wheenk.

== Conservation ==
The Cuban oriole was given a status of "Least Concern" by the IUCN Red List in 2012. However, the Cuban oriole is a host for the brood parasite Shiny Cowbird, which leave their eggs in the nests of tropical orioles to be raised by the orioles.
