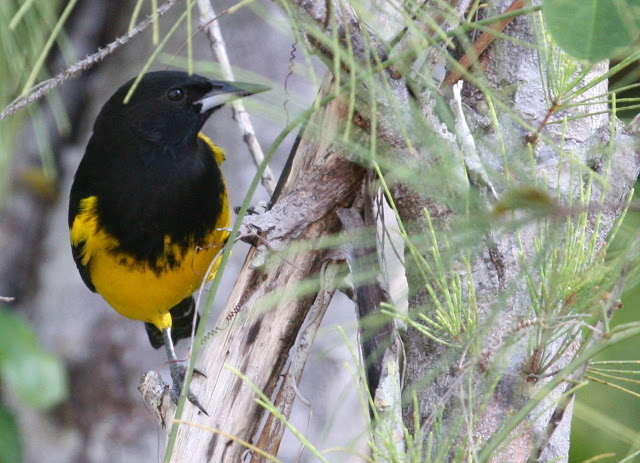

Conservation status
- Endangered (IUCN 3.1)

Scientific classification
- Kingdom: Animalia
- Phylum: Chordata
- Class: Aves
- Order: Passeriformes
- Family: Icteridae
- Genus: Icterus
- Species: I. northropi

Binomial name
- Icterus northropi J. A. Allen, 1890

= Bahama oriole =

Species of songbird

The Bahama oriole (Icterus northropi) is a species of songbird in the New World blackbird family Icteridae (the orioles). It is endemic to the Bahamas, and listed as endangered by the IUCN Red List.

== Taxonomy ==
The species was originally classified as its own distinct species in 1890 by Joel Asaph Allen before it was lumped with the Cuban oriole (Icterus melanopsis), Hispaniolan oriole (Icterus dominicensis), and Puerto Rican oriole (Icterus portoricensis) into a single species by the ornithologist James Bond in his book "Birds of the West Indies". It wasn't until 2010 that all four birds were again elevated to full species status based on a combination of evidence from DNA, plumage and song differences. Since it was not recognized as a distinct species for so long, the Bahama oriole's preferred non-breeding season habitat is unknown and current estimates of its exact numbers remain vague.

== Description ==
The Bahama oriole is a black and yellow oriole that has small white markings on the wings and tail. It shows the most yellow out of all the Caribbean orioles. The adult male and females are mostly black with yellow underparts, ranging from the mid-breast to the vent, thighs, rump, and lower back. The greater coverts and primaries are thinly fringed with white. The wing linings are yellow and the outer tail feathers have small white tips. The bill and eyes are dark black, and the legs are blue-grey. Like most tropical oriole species, the females are similar or identical to the males in coloring. The immature Bahama oriole is more of an olive-grey with the head a yellowish color.

== Habitat ==
Historically, the Bahama oriole has been known to inhabit only two major islands in the Bahamas: Abaco and Andros. It became extirpated from Abaco in the 1990s, and today remains only on Andros. The exact reasons for their extirpation from Abaco remain unknown, but it was likely a consequence of Hurricane Andrew. The oriole is now found on the three major islands of Andros: North Andros, Mangrove Cay, and South Andros. It is likely the oriole also occurs on some of the smaller cays, but current documentation is lacking. The species was recognized as endangered by Birdlife International in 2011 with population estimates of 300 or fewer individuals remaining. However, this population estimate conducted by Price et al. (2011) was exclusive to populations in developed habitats near the coast; new findings suggest that the population size could be much larger than previously estimated now that researchers have documented extensive populations in the pine forest.

In the past, it was assumed the Bahama oriole preferred to live around settlements and nest in coconut palmss (Cocos nucifera), but now research has shown that they likely prefer to nest in the vast pine forest of Andros. Developed habitats are important for nesting since the species often uses introduced Coconut Palm. Bahama Orioles were recently discovered nesting within the pine forest, building nests in understory palms Leucothrinax morrisii and native Caribbean pine (Pinus caribaea). More recently the Bahama oriole has been recorded nesting in many other tree species including other native palms (Sabal palmetto, Coccothrinax argentata) and bananas (Musa). Though the general habitats of the Bahama oriole during the breeding season are known, the preferred habitat of the oriole during the non-breeding season is still unknown, although birds can be encountered in all terrestrial habitat types.

== Conservation status ==
The future of the Bahama oriole remains tenuous. The shiny cowbird (Molothrus bonariensis), a brood parasite that lays its eggs in the nests of other bird species, has expanded its South American and West Indies range northward, and reached Andros in the mid-1990s. Although still relatively uncommon, the cowbirds regularly parasitize the nests of orioles in developed habitats. Also, in developed areas orioles frequently nest in coconut palm (Cocos nucifera), which are dying off because of lethal yellowing disease brought in with introduced palms. As of 2017, lethal yellowing disease has not spread to Mangrove Cay or South Andros. The bigger threats, however, are continued habitat loss from human development, introduced predators (including cats, rats, dogs and hogs) and stochastic processes that, because of the oriole's small population size, increase the risk of extinction. It is also important to conserve the pine forests because it is known that they serve as important habitats for orioles. Ongoing studies are continuing to assess these risks and better estimate the remaining population size.
