= Birds of the West Indies =

1936 field guide by James Bond

- Title page for Birds of the West Indies (1936)
- Author: James Bond
- Language: English
- Genre: Field guide
- Publication date: 1936
- ISBN: 0-618-00210-3

Birds of the West Indies (ISBN 0-618-00210-3) is a book containing exhaustive coverage of the 400+ species of birds found in the Caribbean Sea, excluding the ABC islands, and Trinidad and Tobago, which are considered bio-geographically as part of South America.

Written by ornithologist James Bond, the book was first published in 1936 by the Academy of Natural Sciences as part of the International Series. It was reprinted in 1947 by Macmillan as Field Guide of Birds of the West Indies and has been reprinted several times since then, including as one of the Peterson Field Guides series (PFG 18), a September 1, 1999, edition from Houghton Mifflin and a March 4, 2002 edition from Collins. The book contains approximately 256 pages.

The book was the only text devoted to the avifauna of the region for many decades until A Guide to the Birds of the West Indies (ISBN 0-691-08736-9), by Herbert Raffaele et al., was published in 1998.

== Inspiration for Ian Fleming ==
Birds of the West Indies was a book owned by novelist Ian Fleming, who used the ornithologist's name for his own fictional British secret agent character, Commander James Bond. Fleming, a keen bird watcher while living at his estate in Jamaica, owned this book. He later explained that the author's name was "brief, unromantic, Anglo-Saxon, and yet very masculine – just what I needed." Fleming once said in a Reader's Digest interview: "I wanted the simplest, dullest, plainest-sounding name I could find, and 'James Bond' was much better than something more interesting, like 'Peregrine Carruthers.' Exotic things would happen to and around him, but he would be a neutral figure — an anonymous, blunt instrument wielded by a government department." The book has since become a collector's item amongst Bond fans and was featured as a homage in the twentieth James Bond film, Die Another Day, when Bond poses as an ornithologist while in Cuba. The final shot of the miniseries Fleming: The Man Who Would Be Bond is of a copy of Birds of the West Indies next to Ian Fleming's typewriter.

The story of James Bond and his wife, Mary Fanning Wickham Bond, discovering Ian Fleming's theft of the name and subsequently contacting and meeting Fleming is told in the 2022 documentary The Other Fellow. The film chronicles the lives of several men named James Bond and shows a film, not previously broadcast, of the Bonds meeting Fleming, as well as interviews with James and Mary that were discovered by the film's director Matthew Bauer.

== See also ==
- Inspirations for James Bond
