= Alison Matthews =

Canadian actress

- Born: Montreal, Quebec, Canada
- Occupation: Actress
- Years active: 1995–present
- Website: www.alisonmatthews.com

Alison Matthews is a Canadian actress. A founding faculty member at the Arts Club Actor's Intensive Training Program, she was also a faculty member for five years with the Citadel Banff Professional Theatre Program at the Banff Centre for the Arts in Alberta. As Head of Coaching for Vancouver's Bard on the Beach Shakespeare Festival, she has coached over 40 productions since 2007. As a voice and speech trainer, she works with academics at the Peter Wall Institute for Advanced Studies at the University of British Columbia, with women at the Vancouver Chapter of The Shoe Project, and with community leaders at Leadership Vancouver Island. For the past twenty years she has adjudicator for competitive speech festivals across Western Canada.

Matthews has numerous film and television credits, including roles on The X-Files and Battlestar Galactica, as well as featured roles in films such as Disney's Snow Dogs, and Final Destination 2. Matthews has voiced several anime roles, most notably Ezalia Joule in Gundam SEED, as well as the narrator in Gundam SEED and Gundam SEED Destiny. She also co-starred in NBC Saturday morning series Just Deal.

Matthews holds a M.F.A. in Theatre from the University of British Columbia, and an Associate Diploma in Drama & Speech from Trinity College London.

== Filmography ==
=== Film ===
Year	Title	Role	Notes
1999	The Falling	Stellina	
2002	Snow Dogs	TV Reporter	
2003	Final Destination 2	Physician	
2007	Ghost in the Shell: Stand Alone Complex - The Laughing Man	Motoko Kusanagi	Voice, Direct-to-video
2007	Ghost in the Shell: S.A.C. 2nd GIG – Individual Eleven	Motoko Kusanagi	Voice, Direct-to-video
2008	Stargate: Continuum	Interviewer	Direct-to-video
2008	Sanguine	Narrator	Voice, Short film

=== Television ===
Year	Title	Role	Notes
1995	A Child Missing	Customer	Television film
1996	The Outer Limits	Karen Dunn	Episode: "Worlds Apart"
1996	Poltergeist: The Legacy	Miss McHugh / Kat's Teacher	Episode: "The Reckoning"
1997	Millennium	Sandy Geiger	Episode: "Walkabout"
1997	The X-Files	Doctor	Episode: "Synchrony"
1998	Welcome to Paradox	Agent	Episode: "The Extra"
1998	Mercy Point	Surgeon Reese	Episode: "Opposing Views"
1999	First Wave	Maya	Episode: "The Decision"
1999–2000	Beggars and Choosers	Nancy Ingram	4 episodes
2000	Seven Days	CZN Reporter	Episode: "Brother, Can You Spare a Bomb?"
2000	Stargate SG-1	Brenna	Episode: "Beneath the Surface"
2000–2002	Just Deal	Emily Gordon	23 episodes
2000	The Immortal	Agent Audrey Welles	Episode: "Flight 666"
2001	The Division	Trudy Martin	Episode: "Pilot"
2001	Night Visions	Dr. Martha Tyler	Episode: "After Life"
2001	Da Vinci's Inquest	Arianna Wells' Daughter	Episode: "Oppenheimer Park"
2001–2002	Project ARMS	Queen of Hearts	3 episodes
2002, 2004	The Chris Isaak Show	Lisa Pettigrew, Shana	2 episodes
2002	Beyond Belief: Fact or Fiction		Segment: Writer's Agent
2002	Dark Angel	Female Newscaster	Episode: "Freak Nation"
2002	Taken	News Reporter	Episode: "John"
2003	Ann Rule Presents: The Stranger Beside Me	Beverly Neal	Television film
2004	Tru Calling	Majorie	Episode: "Closure"
2004	Mobile Suit Gundam SEED	Ezalia Joule, Narrator (voices)	50 episodes
2004	Galaxy Angel	Forte Stollen (voice)	130 episodes; 5 seasons
2004	10.5	Donna, Press Secretary	2 episodes
2004	Inuyasha	Toran (voice)	3 episodes
2004	Life as We Known It	Mrs. Thrope	Episode: "Natural Disasters"
2005, 2007	The L Word	Associate Producer, Betty	2 episodes
2006	A Little Thing Called Murder	Regina Laughny	Television film
2006	.hack//Roots	Bordeaux (voice)	
2007	Dragon Boys	Cat. Gail Dorosh	2 episodes
2007	Supernatural	Reporter	Episode: "Nightshifter"
2007	Battlestar Galactica	Karen Fallbrook	3 episodes
2007	Mobile Suit Gundam SEED Destiny	Narrator (voice)	5 episodes
2009	Defying Gravity	Reporter	Episode: "Eve Ate the Apple"
2014	Gracepoint	Desk Sergeant	6 episodes
2016	Bates Motel	Doctor	Episode: "Norman"
2017	The Arrangement	Producer	Episode: "The Leak"
2017	iZombie	Vicky Ernst	Episode: "Wag the Tongue Slowly"
2017	Girlfriends' Guide to Divorce	Linda	Episode: "Rule #930: Plan for New Plans"
2017	All of My Heart: Inn Love	Store Owner	Television film
2019	The Twilight Zone	News Commentator (Iowa)	Episode: "The Wunderkind"
2020	Lego Jurassic World: Double Trouble	OOPSI, Line Jumper (voices)	Episode: "Sibling Rivalry"
2020	Love at the Sunset Terrace	Ashley	Television film
2020	Christmas She Wrote	Woman	Television film
2021	Batwoman	Doctor	Episode: "Do Not Resuscitate"
2023	Guiding Emily	Doris	Television film
