= Lamentation (Millennium) =

- Millennium episode
- Episode no.: Season 1 Episode 18
- Directed by: Winrich Kolbe
- Written by: Chris Carter
- Production code: 4C17
- Original air date: April 18, 1997

Guest appearances
- Bill Smitrovich as Bob Bletcher; Alex Diakun as Dr. Ephraim Fabricant; Sarah-Jane Redmond as Lucy Butler; Michael David Simms as Special Agent Tom Babich; Stephen J. Lang as Bob Geibelhouse; Andrew Airlie as Dr. Willmore; David MacKay as Pathologist; Kurt Max Runte as Federal Marshal; Jane Perry as Agent Pierce; Nino Caratozzolo as Agent Cuevas

Episode chronology
← Previous "Walkabout"	Next → "Powers, Principalities, Thrones and Dominions"
- Millennium season 1

"'Lamentation" is the eighteenth episode of the first season of the American crime-thriller television series Millennium. It premiered on the Fox network on April 18, 1997. The episode was written by series creator Chris Carter and directed by Winrich Kolbe. "Lamentation" featured guest appearances by Bill Smitrovich and Alex Diakun, and introduced Sarah-Jane Redmond as Lucy Butler.

Millennium Group consultant Frank Black (Lance Henriksen) searches for an escaped convict he had helped to catch, believing that the criminal's new wife Lucy Butler (Redmond) may be helping him. However, Butler may instead be a much greater threat to Black and his family than he had anticipated.

"Lamentation" marked the death of recurring character Bob Bletcher, played by Smitrovich. Smitrovich had appeared intermittently since "Pilot". The episode has been well-received critically, described as a "pivotal point" in the series. It was viewed by approximately 6.5 million households in its original broadcast.

== Plot ==
Millennium Group consultant Frank Black (Lance Henriksen) and Seattle police lieutenant Bob Bletcher (Bill Smitrovich) are hiking across the North Cascades when Black receives an urgent page from the FBI. Travelling to the Behavioral Sciences Unit in Virginia, Black learns that serial killer Ephraim Fabricant (Alex Diakun) has escaped from a hospital while donating a kidney to his sister. Fabricant was arrested and convicted due to the profile constructed by Black; he was spared execution when Black asked for leniency in order to allow Fabricant's mind to be studied.

Fellow Group member Peter Watts (Terry O'Quinn) informs Black that, before his escape, Fabricant had married a correspondent he had met through a prison pen pal service. Watts and Black interview the woman, Lucy Butler (Sarah-Jane Redmond), at her home. Butler is adamant she has not seen or heard from Fabricant since his escape. However, Black finds information on Butler's computer which he believes is linked to his own home address, and photographs of a judge who he recognizes as having been murdered. Meanwhile, Fabricant is being operated on by a nurse whose face is hidden; she removes the staples from his surgical incision. Black and Watts return to Butler's home with a search warrant, having discovered that her young son had been killed with cyanide and that she had been suspected of the murder; the judge had also been poisoned with the same substance.

Fabricant is found in a hospital emergency room, collapsing from his injuries. A doctor discovers his second kidney has been removed without anesthesia. Black's home telephone number is found on Fabricant's hospital bracelet. Back at Black's home, his wife Catherine (Megan Gallagher) finds a human kidney in her refrigerator. A strange man appears at the top of her staircase, and she runs to find her husband's gun, which is missing. Bletcher arrives, letting Catherine know that her daughter Jordan is safe outside with a colleague of his. He searches the house for the intruder, finding Butler instead. As a bolt of lightning illuminates the scene, her face has distorted into that of a demon. Detective Bob Giebelhouse (Stephen J. Lang) later discovers Bletcher's body hanging from a ceiling post, with his throat cut.

Meanwhile, Fabricant warns Black that he was taken from the hospital and operated on by the "sum of all evil"; he also warns that this entity knows who Black is and what he is capable of. Returning home, Black discovers that Butler was arrested elsewhere for a driving offense but was released without charge. Black takes his daughter Jordan hiking over the same North Cascades trail he and Bletcher had visited earlier.

== Production ==
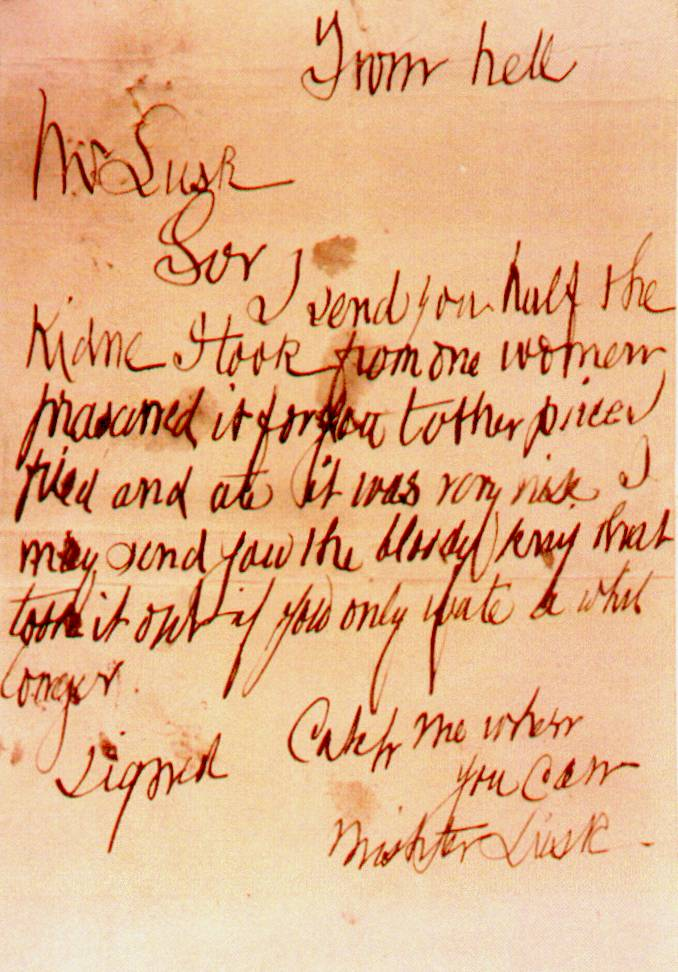
The use of a kidney as a message was inspired by the From Hell letter.

"Lamentation" was the third of four episodes helmed by director Winrich Kolbe, who had previously worked on "Force Majeure" and "Kingdom Come", and would return later in the first season for "Broken World". The episode was written by series creator Chris Carter. Beyond creating the concept for Millennium, Carter would write a total of six other episodes for the series in addition to "Lamentation"—three in the first season, and a further three in the third season.

The character Ephraim Fabricant was named for real-life murderer Valery Fabrikant, a mechanical engineering professor who shot dead four of his colleagues in what became known as the Concordia University massacre. In addition, the character's back-story and demise were both intended to echo the case of Jack the Ripper—both were believed to be medically trained, while the use of Fabricant's kidney to send a message is based on the From Hell letter, sent to the police by the Ripper along with one of his victims' kidneys.

The episode features the death of the character Bob Bletcher. Smitrovich had first portrayed Bletcher in "Pilot", appearing intermittently throughout the first season. Smitrovich's final appearance would be in the following episode, "Powers, Principalities, Thrones and Dominions".

"Lamentation" also introduces the character Lucy Butler, who would return in "Powers, Principalities, Thrones and Dominions", as well as in the second season episode "A Room with No View", and the third season episodes "Antipas" and "Saturn Dreaming of Mercury". Redmond, admittedly a fan of Carter and recurring series director David Nutter, had initially auditioned for another episode of the first season, set to be directed by Nutter. Redmond did not get the part she auditioned for but was instead contacted about portraying a minor recurring role instead, which led to her casting as Butler.

== Broadcast and reception ==
"This is Carter taking off the kid gloves, saying he’s ready to do this, in a way he never really was on X-Files. If you wanna get into the root of all evil on Earth, well, Carter’s prepared to go there with you."

— The A.V. Club's Emily VanDerWerff on "Lamentation"

"Lamentation" was first broadcast on the Fox Network on April 18, 1997. The episode earned a Nielsen rating of 6.7 during its original broadcast, meaning that 6.7 percent of households in the United States viewed the episode. This represented 6.5 million households, and left the episode the fifty-seventh most-viewed broadcast that week. (Note: Each ratings point represented 970,000 households during the 1996–1997 television season.)

The episode received positive reviews from critics. The A.V. Club's Emily VanDerWerff rated the episode an A, describing it as "an episode where the show crystallizes and clarifies its central mission". VanDerWerff felt that episode's first half was "bland" and "fairly staid", but that its second half compensated for this, becoming " one of the best episodes of horror TV I’ve ever seen". Bill Gibron, writing for DVD Talk, rated the episode 5 out of 5, calling it "one of the scariest, creepiest installments of the entire first season". Gibron felt that "with the unexpected shock ending and a wonderfully suspenseful sequence in the Black home, this is one of the best episodes of Millennium". Robert Shearman and Lars Pearson, in their book Wanting to Believe: A Critical Guide to The X-Files, Millennium & The Lone Gunmen, rated "Lamentation" five stars out of five, finding its first act to be "a classic piece of misdirection". Shearman felt that "Lamentation" was "an intentional jolt to the show", describing it as "a pivotal point" in a series which had been "radically redefining itself".

== Footnotes ==
=== References ===
- Genge, N. E. (1997). Millennium: The Unofficial Companion Volume Two. Century. ISBN 0712678697.
- Shearman, Robert; Pearson, Lars (2009). Wanting to Believe: A Critical Guide to The X-Files, Millennium & The Lone Gunmen. Mad Norwegian Press. ISBN 978-0975944691.
