= Walkabout (Millennium) =

- Millennium episode
- Episode no.: Season 1 Episode 17
- Directed by: Cliff Bole
- Written by: Chip Johannessen; Tim Tankosic
- Production code: 4C15
- Original air date: March 28, 1997

Guest appearances
- Željko Ivanek as Dr. Daniel 'Danny' Miller; Gregory Itzin as Hans Ingram; Ron Sauve as Tardot; Dee Jay Jackson as G.J.; Alison Matthews as Sandy Geiger; Cheryl Mullen as Sal; Nancy Kerr as Personnel Chief Dana Flender

Episode chronology
← Previous "Covenant"	Next → "Lamentation"
- Millennium season 1

"'Walkabout" is the seventeenth episode of the first season of the American crime-thriller television series Millennium. It premiered on the Fox network on March 28, 1997. The episode was written by Chip Johannessen and Tim Tankosic, and directed by Cliff Bole. "Walkabout" featured guest appearances by Željko Ivanek and Gregory Itzin.

Forensic profiler Frank Black (Lance Henriksen), a member of the private investigative organisation Millennium Group, finds himself suffering from amnesia after taking part in a nightmarish drug trial. Fearing that someone may have died as a result, Black attempts to track down the doctor responsible.

"Walkabout" was the only episode of the series to feature contributions from either Bole or Tankosic. The episode, which opens with a quotation from Cicero, was viewed by approximately 6.1 million households in its initial broadcast, and earned mixed to positive reviews from critics.

== Plot ==
Inside a medical clinic, a nurse locks a room behind her before one of the occupants can rape her. The occupants are screaming, panicking and self-mutilating; one man—Frank Black (Lance Henriksen)—begins pounding on a pane of reinforced glass until his fists bleed. Millennium Group investigator Peter Watts (Terry O'Quinn) visits Black's wife Catherine (Megan Gallagher) to tell her husband, a fellow Group member, disappeared on his way to Yakima, Washington. Watts combs Black's computer history, finding emails back and forth between Black—using the pseudonym "David Marx"—and a doctor named Daniel Miller. Catherine reveals that the pseudonym Black has been using is one he had also used to check into hotels during a previous mental breakdown.

Black is discovered at a bus station by police, his hands injured and bandaged. He has no recollection of events save for the suspicion that someone died during the gap in his memory. Watts helps Black trace Miller (Željko Ivanek) to a hotel, where he informs them that Black was seeking a cure for his apparent psychic ability. Miller had been helping Black join a clinical trial for a drug called Proloft which would treat temporal lobe abnormalities; however, Black refutes that he would be interested in such a thing. Visiting a clinic, Black's ability reveals to him that he has been there before. Black is able to use the Millennium Group to persuade the drug company to release records from the clinical trial, which allow him to trace other participants. He finds that one participant died after gouging his own eyes out; the body of the supervising nurse is later found in a dumpster.

Research on the drug given to the trial participants reveals it to be a chiral chemical, with two enantiomer forms; one is the harmless and beneficial Proloft, but the other is the dangerous hallucinogen which Black and the other participants ingested. Miller tells Black that he had been working on the drugs to cure his own visions, which he believes are similar to Black's. One night, years earlier, Miller ceased having visions after he ran into oncoming traffic, almost killing himself in a hallucinatory state. After Black leaves, Hans Ingram (Gregory Itzin), the doctor responsible for the trial, breaks into Miller's hotel room.

Later, Miller is killed in a traffic accident after once again running into traffic; Black finds a photograph of Ingram on his body. Watts and the police investigate Ingram's home, finding the eyeless body of the dead trial participant and sachets of something called "Smooth Time", which they ascertain to be the hallucinogenic enantiomer of Proloft. Watts and the Millennium Group receive news that workers at an office building are rioting. Black realizes that Ingram had been distributing "Smooth Time" under the guise of a sweetener in order to drug a large number of people. Tracking Ingram to the building's surveillance room, he learns that Ingram believes that the country's dependence on antidepressants has created a nation of "zombies" and is attempting to "wake them up" with violent hallucinogens. Ingram is arrested and taken into custody.

At home with his family, Black's motives for visiting the drug trials return to him—he is concerned about his young daughter Jordan, believing that she has inherited his abilities. He is now dissuaded from using pharmaceuticals to suppress his ability, opting instead to guide Jordan to understand her gift.

== Production ==
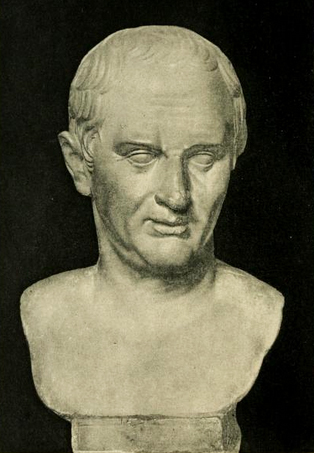
"Walkabout" opens with a quote from orator Cicero.

"Walkabout" is the third Millennium episode penned by Chip Johannessen, after "Blood Relatives" and "Force Majeure". Johannessen would go on to write an additional ten episodes across all three seasons, including the series' final episode "Goodbye to All That". After Millennium's cancellation, Johannessen would also contribute an episode to its sister show The X-Files, 1999's "Orison".

Co-writer Tim Tankosic's contribution to this episode was his only involvement in Millennium. The episode also marked the only contribution to the series by director Cliff Bole. Bole also contributed episodes to The X-Files and Millennium creator Chris Carter's series Harsh Realm. Guest star Željko Ivanek had also previously appeared in "Roland", an episode of The X-Files.

Lance Henriksen was concerned that it would be out of character for Frank Black to recklessly take untested drugs, and suggested adding a line of dialogue—"I don't even take aspirin"—to the script to help clue the audience in to the fact that his involvement in the clinical trial was an attempt to aid his daughter. The episode begins with a quotation translated from classical Roman orator Marcus Tullius Cicero's treatise De finibus bonorum et malorum—"I remember the very things I do not wish to; I cannot forget the things I wish to forget". The phrase is found at the beginning of Book II of the work.

== Broadcast and reception ==
There have been a great many shows and books and movies about the so-called horrors of psych meds, and it's the sort of easy to agree with concept that gets overplayed without much in the way of nuance. This episode, thankfully, acknowledges that drugs really can help people.

— The A.V. Club's Zack Handlen on the episode's themes.

"Walkabout" was first broadcast on the Fox Network on March 28, 1997. The episode earned a Nielsen rating of 6.3 during its original broadcast, meaning that 6.3 percent of households in the United States viewed the episode. This represented 6.1 million households, and left the episode the sixty-seventh most-viewed broadcast that week. (Note: Each ratings point represented 970,000 households during the 1996–1997 television season.)

The episode received mixed to positive reviews from critics. Robert Shearman and Lars Pearson, in their book Wanting to Believe: A Critical Guide to The X-Files, Millennium & The Lone Gunmen, rated the episode two stars out of five, comparing it to "Demons", an episode of The X-Files which was broadcast during the same season. Shearman and Pearson found "Walkabout" the better episode of the two, but felt that it became "a curiously passionate affair" after the first act—from the cold open until Black is found by the police. Shearman also noted that Željko Ivanek's guest performance "lacked subtlety", though praised Henriksen for a "bravura performance. Bill Gibron, writing for DVD Talk, rated "Walkabout" 4 out of 5, describing it as "a fine outing". Gibron felt that the episode "forces us to confront uneasy questions", likening the narrative to "a giant puzzle with the pieces tossed at us from all angles". Zack Handlen, writing for The A.V. Club, rated "Walkabout" an A−. Handlen noted that he was pleasantly surprised that the episode did not play on clichéd amnesia tropes as he had expected, and felt that involving Black so heavily in the cold open was a good method of changing the series' usual formula.

== Footnotes ==
=== References ===
- Cicero, Marcus Tullis; Annas, Julia (2001). On Moral Ends. Cambridge University Press. ISBN 0521669014.
- Genge, N. E. (1997). Millennium: The Unofficial Companion Volume Two. Century. ISBN 0712678697.
- Shearman, Robert; Pearson, Lars (2009). Wanting to Believe: A Critical Guide to The X-Files, Millennium & The Lone Gunmen. Mad Norwegian Press. ISBN 978-0975944691.
