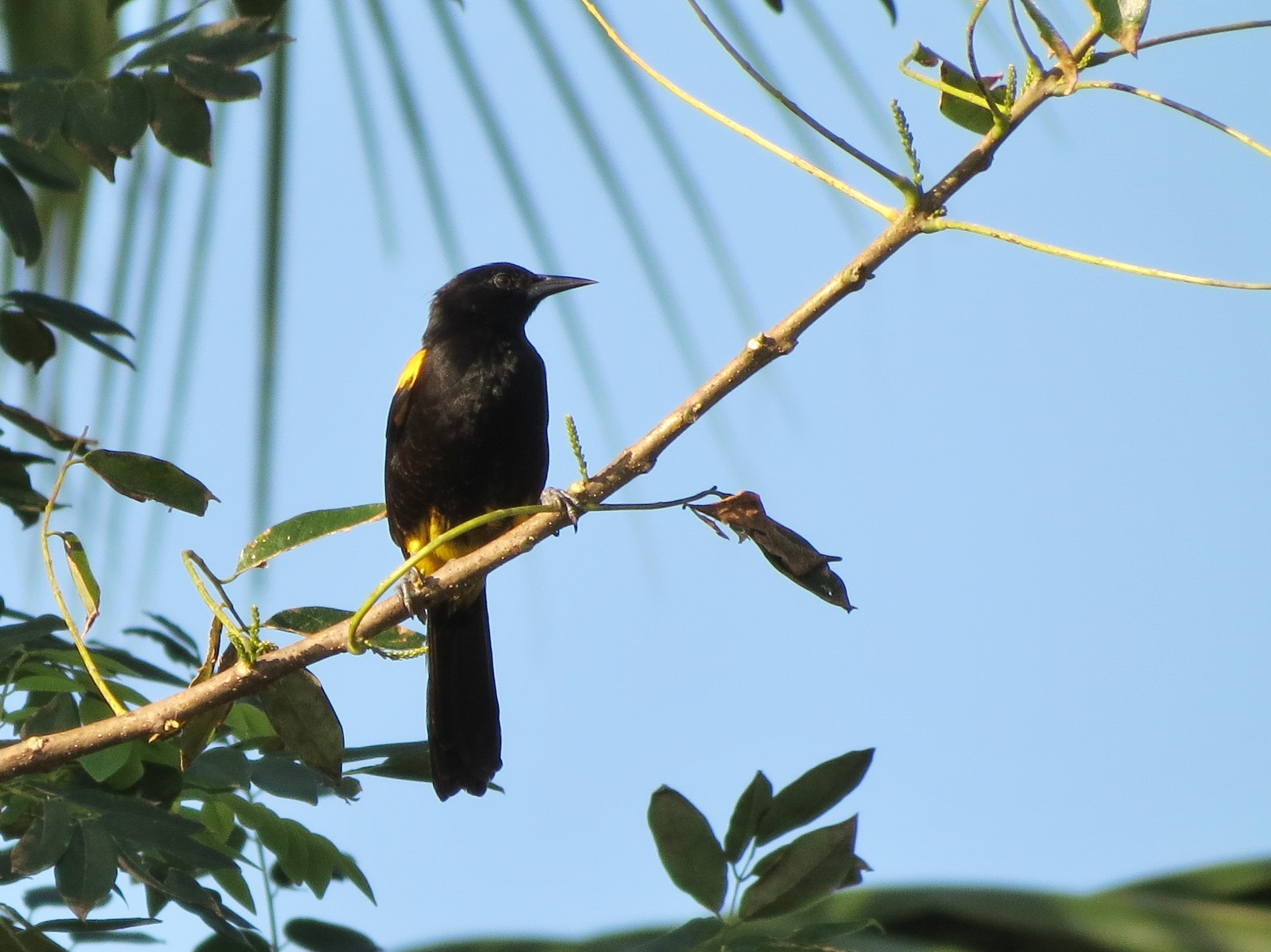

Conservation status
- Least Concern (IUCN 3.1)

Scientific classification
- Kingdom: Animalia
- Phylum: Chordata
- Class: Aves
- Order: Passeriformes
- Family: Icteridae
- Genus: Icterus
- Species: I. portoricensis

Binomial name
- Icterus portoricensis H. Bryant, 1866

= Puerto Rican oriole =

Species of bird

The Puerto Rican oriole (Icterus portoricensis), or calandria is a species of bird in the family Icteridae, and genus Icterus or New World blackbirds. This species is a part of a subgroup of orioles (Clade A) that includes the North American orchard oriole, Icterus spurius, and the hooded oriole, Icterus cucullatus.

The Puerto Rican oriole was previously grouped with Cuban oriole (Icterus melanopsis), Hispaniolan oriole (Icterus dominicensis), and Bahama oriole (Icterus northropi) as a single species, (Icterus dominicensis). In 2010, all four species became recognized as full species by the American Ornithologists' Union.

== Habitat ==
The oriole is endemic to Puerto Rico. Its natural habitats are the tropical forests, mangrove forests, and plantations. The bird also shows a natural preference for nesting in palm trees.

== Behavior ==
After breeding, adult Puerto Rican orioles and their young will remain together in a family group. It primarily forages in dense vegetation looking for a wide range of foods that includes fruits, insects, lizards, and nuts and grains.

== Description ==
Males and females are similar in size and color. Males weigh about 41.0 grams and females weigh about 36.6 g. The average wingspan of males and females is 96.9 and 92.1 mm, respectively. In 2008, Hofmann, Cronin, and Omland, conducted a study that showed there is little color difference in the feathers between the males and females of many tropical orioles, including the Puerto Rican oriole. This means that males and females both have elaborate colors, in contrast many temperate-zoned birds have brightly colored males and dull colored females.

Adults are black with yellow on their lower belly and shoulder. The closely related Hispaniolan oriole (Icterus dominicensis) and Bahama oriole (Icterus northropi) have more yellow on their bodies, but, the Cuban oriole (Icterus melanopsis) has more black.

Juveniles are tawny colored with an olive tint to their rump. Puerto Rican orioles develop their bright colors as they age. The tawny color offers a selective advantage to the adolescents since by helping with camouflage in the dense forest. This is likely the ancestral state for the genus Icterus.

== Communication ==
Both males and females of the Puerto Rican oriole sing with no obvious difference in song structure. The song of the Puerto Rican oriole is composed of clicks or "high pitched whistles" and has a frequency range between 3.6 and 5.3 kHz. The bird combines between 15 and 27 different notes to make up their song. Due to sex and geographic bias in studying predominantly male samples of temperate-zone birds, which do not exhibit female song, it has historically been assumed that only males of the Puerto Rican orioles sing. However, in 2009, Price, Lanyon, and Omland conducted a study that shows that both males and females of many tropical orioles sing. This has been substantiated by 2016 documentation of female song in Puerto Rican orioles by Campbell et al., proving that song is not a method of communication solely possessed by males. The research theorizes that the prevalence of female song correlates to a tropical lifestyle wherein there is increased female-female competition and territory defense that necessitates such communication. Additionally, ancestral state reconstruction of the Caribbean oriole clade shows that female song is an ancestral trait.

== Reproduction ==
Most members of this genus are thought to be monogamous, establishing lifelong bonds between males and females. The Puerto Rican oriole breeds primarily from February through July. It lays about three eggs per clutch. The eggs are white with a bluish hue with light lavender-gray-brown speckles and spots. The nests are structured as a basket made from woven fibers of palm material, and are usually suspended from the underside of a palm leaf by two points. One threat to oriole nesting is parasitism by the shiny cowbird, especially in coastal habitats.

== See also ==
- Fauna of Puerto Rico
- List of birds of Puerto Rico
- List of endemic fauna of Puerto Rico
- List of Puerto Rican birds
- List of Vieques birds
- El Toro Wilderness
