= The Other Fellow (2022 film) =

- Promotional release poster
- Directed by: Matthew Bauer
- Written by: Matthew Bauer; Rene van Pannevis
- Produced by: Matthew Bauer; Michelle Brøndum
- Starring: Gunnar James Bond Schäfer; James Alexander Bond; James Bond Jr.; Gregory Itzin; Tacey Adams; Charley Palmer Rothwell; Chae-Jamal McFarlane
- Cinematography: Jamie Touche
- Edited by: Lesley Posso
- Music by: Alastair McNamara
- Production companies: Mission Brief; Jante Films
- Distributed by: Gravitas Ventures (North America); NjutaFilms (Scandinavia); Bulldog Film Distribution (United Kingdom)
- Release dates: 22 June 2022 (Doc Edge); 19 May 2023 (United Kingdom)
- Running time: 80 minutes
- Country: United Kingdom
- Language: English

The Other Fellow is a 2022 British documentary drama that explores the lives of real men around the world who are named James Bond. The film combines interviews with live action footage and re-enactment sequences of its subjects. The film was written, produced, and directed by Australian director Matthew Bauer.

== Synopsis ==
The Other Fellow begins in 1952 at the Goldeneye estate in Jamaica, when British author Ian Fleming creates the character of 007 for his first novel Casino Royale and gives him the name of James Bond, which he takes from an American ornithologist of the same name who was an expert on birds of the Caribbean.

Seventy years later in 2022, the film follows several main characters who share the name James Bond. The characters include Gunnar James Bond Schäfer, a superfan of all things 007 with his own James Bond Museum in Sweden; James Alexander Bond, a gay theatre director in New York City who finds the name a hindrance; James Bond Jr., an African-American man in Indiana State Prison awaiting trial for murder; and ornithologist James Bond and his wife Mary in Philadelphia, who confront Ian Fleming about the impact his use of their name has had on their lives. The film also includes an additional main character: an unnamed woman living in an unspecified location in England.

The film explores themes of identity, fandom, and the impact of the worldwide digital and cultural footprint of the James Bond franchise on the lives of people who share the name James Bond.

The title comes from the James Bond film On Her Majesty's Secret Service. In the film, George Lazenby replaced Sean Connery as the actor portraying James Bond, who at the time was the only film actor to have played the role and was a very well-known figure. The first scene of the film features James Bond saving a woman, but instead of kissing him, she chooses to drive away. He then says "This never happened to the other fellow," referencing Sean Connery's portrayal of James Bond. Bauer told Filmink: "These are the situations that our characters face – continuously being in the shadow of this movie icon. For me, it's 007 who is 'the other fellow' – the fictional character."

== Cast ==
- Gunnar James Bond Schäfer Self - 007 Museum Curator (as Gunnar Schäfer)
- James Alexander Bond as Self - Theatre Director
- James Bond Jr. as Self - Inmate #280938
- Gregory Itzin as James Bond - Ornithologist
- Charley Palmer Rothwell as Johannes Schäfer
- Tacey Adams as Mary Wickham Bond
- Matthew Bauer as Self - Director (voice)
- James Bond as Self - Ornithologist (archive footage)
- Chae-Jamal McFarlane as James Bond
- James Bond as Self

== Production ==
The film's director, Matthew Bauer, decided to make the movie after contacting hundreds of men named James Bond on social media and discovering that many had unexpected and dramatic stories to share. He interviewed around a hundred James Bonds, and narrowed it down to fifteen characters that were featured in the film, five of whom were the main characters.

Bauer told Variety magazine: "What interested me was not so much that these men are named James Bond, but how the name connects them to a global media phenomenon – literally, emotionally, and especially digitally. The real plot of The Other Fellow centers around the surprising ways its force pushes and pulls their lives in the most unexpected directions. And how it connects them together in ways you'd never anticipate."

== Filming ==
Filming took place between the premiere of the James Bond film Skyfall until the premiere of No Time to Die. The film was shot in various countries including the United Kingdom, USA, Jamaica, Sweden, Italy, Canada, India, Thailand and Guyana.

== Release ==
The Other Fellow had its World Premiere at the 2022 Doc Edge Film Festival as its Opening Night Film where it won its category and was nominated for Best International Feature.

The film had its UK Festival Premiere at the Screenplay Film Festival in a programme curated by Mark Kermode who introduced the film as "genuinely astonishing, surprising, uplifting & funny." The USA Premiere was at the Austin Film Festival where it was nominated for Best Documentary and European Premiere at the Dinard Festival of British Cinema where Xavier Bonnet of Rolling Stone chose the film as one of his top films saying, "The idea resembles those born out of nowhere at the end of a drinking spree between friends: to go in search of strangers around the world whose surname is that of a certain agent 007."

It also screened as the Opening Night Film of the Alameda International Film Festival and Aegean Docs, Closing Night Film of Dok Belgrade and at Melbourne Documentary Film Festival, San Francisco Independent Film Festival, Chagrin Documentary Film Festival and Docville.

It was picked up by Gravitas Ventures for a February 17, 2023 North American theatrical release and by Bulldog Film Distribution for a May 19, 2023 United Kingdom theatrical release.

The film was acquired by Amazon Prime Video for a June 1, 2023 USA streaming release and by ITVX for a January 4, 2024 United Kingdom streaming release.

Worldwide, the film is available on various streaming services including Prime Video, Apple TV, YouTube, Canal+, Tubi, Google Play, Vudu, Filmin, ViaPlay, SBS on Demand, Blockbuster, Microsoft Store, yes, The Roku Channel, Xumo, DocPlay, Vimeo, Sky Store, TV3, Telia Play and Plex.

The film was released under the title Our Name Is Bond in certain international territories.

== Reception ==
On the review aggregation website Rotten Tomatoes, the film holds a score of 93%, based on 27 reviews. The site's critical consensus reads: "Breezy in terms of length yet surprisingly expansive with its scope, The Other Fellow uses the experience of sharing a world-famous role to pose probing questions of privacy and identity."

Mark Kermode gave the film a positive review on Kermode and Mayo's Take saying “I must say that when I started watching it, I was like: 'This is an entire documentary about people called James Bond? How is this possibly going to fill a feature length film?' But there are enough interesting stories in there to more than keep your attention gripped" and that "you should see the documentary. It's a far more interesting film about people called James Bond than you would expect it to be."

Several reviewers gave The Other Fellow four stars: John Nugent of Empire called it "an extremely watchable look at a unique naming phenomenon — with surprisingly profound results." Stuart Mulrain of the BBC said "there's so much more depth to this than I was expecting. I thought it would just be this really light, fluffy thing. But it's so much more than that and it's wonderfully put together. It’s perfectly paced. It’s genuinely compelling. I was generally surprised by it." Alan Ng of Film Threat wrote, "Through research and diligence, filmmaker Matthew Bauer managed to string together an intriguing and engaging film." Richard Crouse of CTV wrote, "The Other Fellow isn’t a James Bond film, or a film about James Bond films. Instead, it is an intriguing and well packaged look at what it is like to be James Bond, or at least carry his name." Jennie Kermode of Eye for Film wrote, “This documentary might sound like a bit of fluff, but it delivers some surprisingly profound stories." Brian Orndorf of Blu-ray.com called it "a gimmick turned into a fascinating sit by Bauer." Peter Gray of The AU Review described the film as "Funny and poignant" and that "Bauer’s lens feels welcomingly progressive and, most importantly, laced in a relatability and humanity that isn’t always afforded by the character’s incarnation." Erika Jarhed of MovieZine called it "a skillfully composed, and unique, documentary that manages to include everything from comedy to tragedy."

Leslie Felperin of The Guardian called it a "whimsical film and non-famous James Bonds." Gary M. Kramer of Salon.com called it an "illuminating documentary." Edward Porter of The Sunday Times said that "each tale has its own piquancy" whilst Guy Kelly of The Telegraph called it "strangely fascinating."

Kevin Maher of The Times criticised the film for "focusing on Swedish super-fan Gunnar Schäfer who, in 2007, formally changed his name to Nils Gunnar Bond James Schäfer" whilst Wendy Ide of The Observer said the film "dedicates too much time to a rather off-putting Swedish Bond obsessive who has officially changed his name and is possibly a few cylinders short of the full Aston Martin."

Many reviewers highlighted the film's plot twist: Mark Kermode cited "this one central story which when it's introduced you think: 'Where is this going? This is almost like I’ve changed channels? Why is this happening?'" James Sullivan of The Boston Globe said, "Like any good Bond film, there's a bit of mystery that goes unsolved until the closing minutes" and that "How James Bond fits into this particular story - well, it's shocking. Positively shocking."

== Accolades ==
Date of ceremony	Award	Category	Recipient (s)	Result	REF
2022	Doc Edge Film Festival	Best International Feature	The Other Fellow Matthew Bauer	Nominated	
2022	Doc Edge Film Festival	And Action...	The Other Fellow Matthew Bauer	Won	
2022	Austin Film Festival	Best Documentary Feature	The Other Fellow Matthew Bauer	Nominated	
2022	British Independent Film Awards	Best Debut Director (Feature Documentary)	Matthew Bauer	Longlisted	
2023	National Film Awards	Best Documentary	The Other Fellow Matthew Bauer	Nominated	
2023	Chagrin Documentary Film Festival	Human Spirit Award	The Other Fellow Matthew Bauer	Won	
