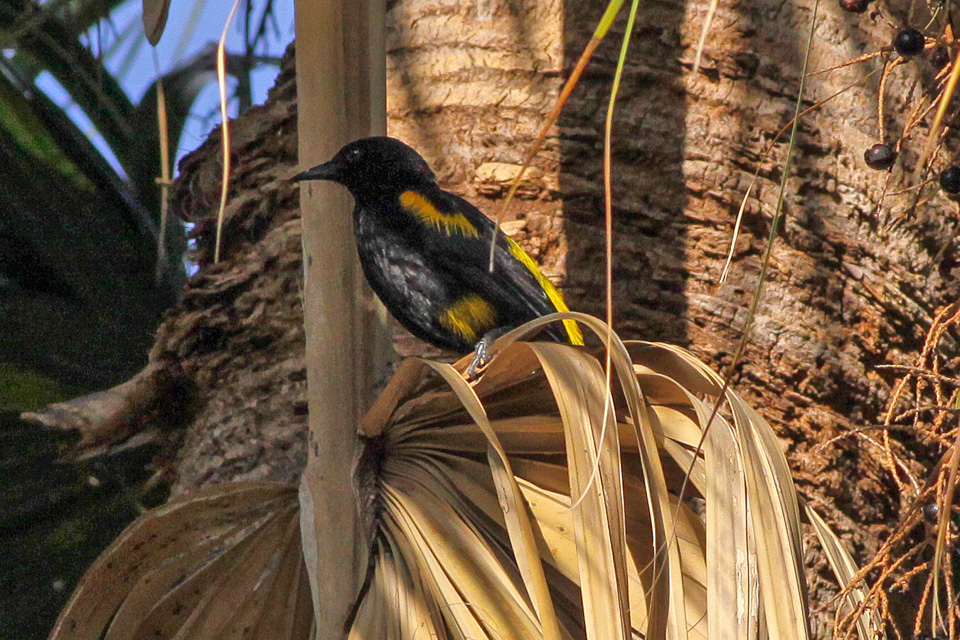

Conservation status
- Least Concern (IUCN 3.1)

Scientific classification
- Kingdom: Animalia
- Phylum: Chordata
- Class: Aves
- Order: Passeriformes
- Family: Icteridae
- Genus: Icterus
- Species: I. dominicensis

Binomial name
- Icterus dominicensis (Linnaeus, 1766)

Synonyms
- Oriolus dominicensis Linnaeus, 1766

= Hispaniolan oriole =

Species of oriole endemic to Hispanola

The Hispaniolan oriole (Icterus dominicensis) is a species of bird in the family Icteridae. It is endemic to the Caribbean island of Hispaniola (split between the Dominican Republic and Haiti).

== Taxonomy ==
In 1760 the French zoologist Mathurin Jacques Brisson included a description of the Hispaniolan oriole in his Ornithologie based on a specimen collected on the French colony of Saint-Domingue on the Caribbean island of Hispaniola. He used the French name Le carouge de S. Domingue and the Latin name Xanthornus Dominicensis. Although Brisson coined Latin names, these do not conform to the binomial system and are not recognised by the International Commission on Zoological Nomenclature. When the Swedish naturalist Carl Linnaeus updated his Systema Naturae for the twelfth edition in 1766, he added 240 species that had been previously described by Brisson, with one of them being the Hispaniolan oriole. Linnaeus included a brief description, coined the binomial name Oriolus dominicensis and cited Brisson's work. This species is now placed in the genus Icterus that was also introduced by Brisson.

The Hispaniolan oriole was once identified as a distinct species. However, in 1936, American ornithologist James Bond grouped it, the Cuban oriole (Icterus melanopsis), the Bahama oriole (I. northropi), and the Puerto Rican oriole (I. portoricensis) into a single species according to the biological species concept in his book "Birds of the West Indies." The orioles used to be considered the Greater Antillean or black-cowled oriole group, but in 2010, the American Ornithologist' Union declared the four subspecies as full species.

== Description ==
The Hispaniolan oriole is a slender-billed black and yellow oriole that lacks white markings on the wings. It shows more yellow than most Caribbean orioles, except for the Bahama oriole (Icterus northropi). The adult males and females are black overall, with distinctive yellow patches on shoulders, rump, and under-tail coverts extending to the lower breast. Like most tropical oriole species, the females are similar or identical to the males in coloring. In juvenile Hispaniolan orioles, the upper parts are mainly olive, while the underparts are dull yellow. The wings are black, and the throat is sometimes a black or reddish-brown that is not clearly demarcated. The length of the Hispaniolan oriole is an average of 20–22 cm, with males weighing 35–38 g while the females weigh 33–40 g. A similar species that is often mistaken for the Hispaniolan oriole is the yellow-shouldered blackbird (Agelaius xanthomus), which is a similar size but only has yellow patches on the shoulders.

== Vocalization ==
The call of the Hispaniolan oriole is described as a sharp keck or check. The song is rarely heard, and is a series of high-pitched whistles. The song is usually given after dawn, but is almost never heard in the daytime, which is similar to the Puerto Rican oriole (Icterus portoricensis). It is known that females of other oriole species sing, but songs by female Hispaniolan orioles have not been identified.

== Habitat ==
The Hispaniolan oriole is a year-round endemic to the island of Hispaniola (in both the Dominican Republic and Haiti), as well as the nearby islands of Gonâve, Saona, and Tortuga. It resides in tropical and subtropical forests, forest edges, woodlands, and gardens, from the coast to mid-elevations in mountains. However, it is not as common at higher elevations. They are commonly found where palm fronds are available for nesting, and are also found on the many shaded coffee plantations on the island. The Hispaniolan oriole seems to be rare in Hispaniolan pine (Pinus occidentalis) forests, in the highlands of the Dominican Republic; however, other species of orioles, such as the Bahama oriole, have been documented nesting in pine forests. Since there has been no published population assessment, there is a possibility that the Hispaniolan oriole can be found nesting in pine forests.

== Feeding ==
The diet of the Hispaniolan oriole consists of fruits, insects, flowers, and nectar. They often consume the nectar of the Erythrina plant. The orioles can hang upside-down to reach foods or insects on the underside of leaves. They are often found foraging in dense vegetation.

== Nesting ==
The Hispaniolan oriole's breeding season is from March to June, although it can breed irregularly at other times of the year. The eggs are white, with a pale blue hue, and have dark brown spots. On average, the clutch size is 3 eggs. They usually make their nest on the underside of banana trees or palm fronds. The nest is a hanging basket made from finely woven plant fibers, mainly from palm leaves. When fledglings become fully independent, they undergo pre-basic molts. Usually, the entire body plumage and wing-coverts are replaced.

== Conservation ==
The status of the Hispaniolan oriole is listed as "Least Concern" on the IUCN Red List. Although there have been no published population assessments, there are numerous observations of the oriole all throughout the island. There is a possibility that the population could decline because of increased brood parasitism from the recently arrived shiny cowbird (Molothrus bonariensis). They have been described as the "highest quality" host for the cowbird on the island.
