= Matthew Bauer (film director) =

Australian film director

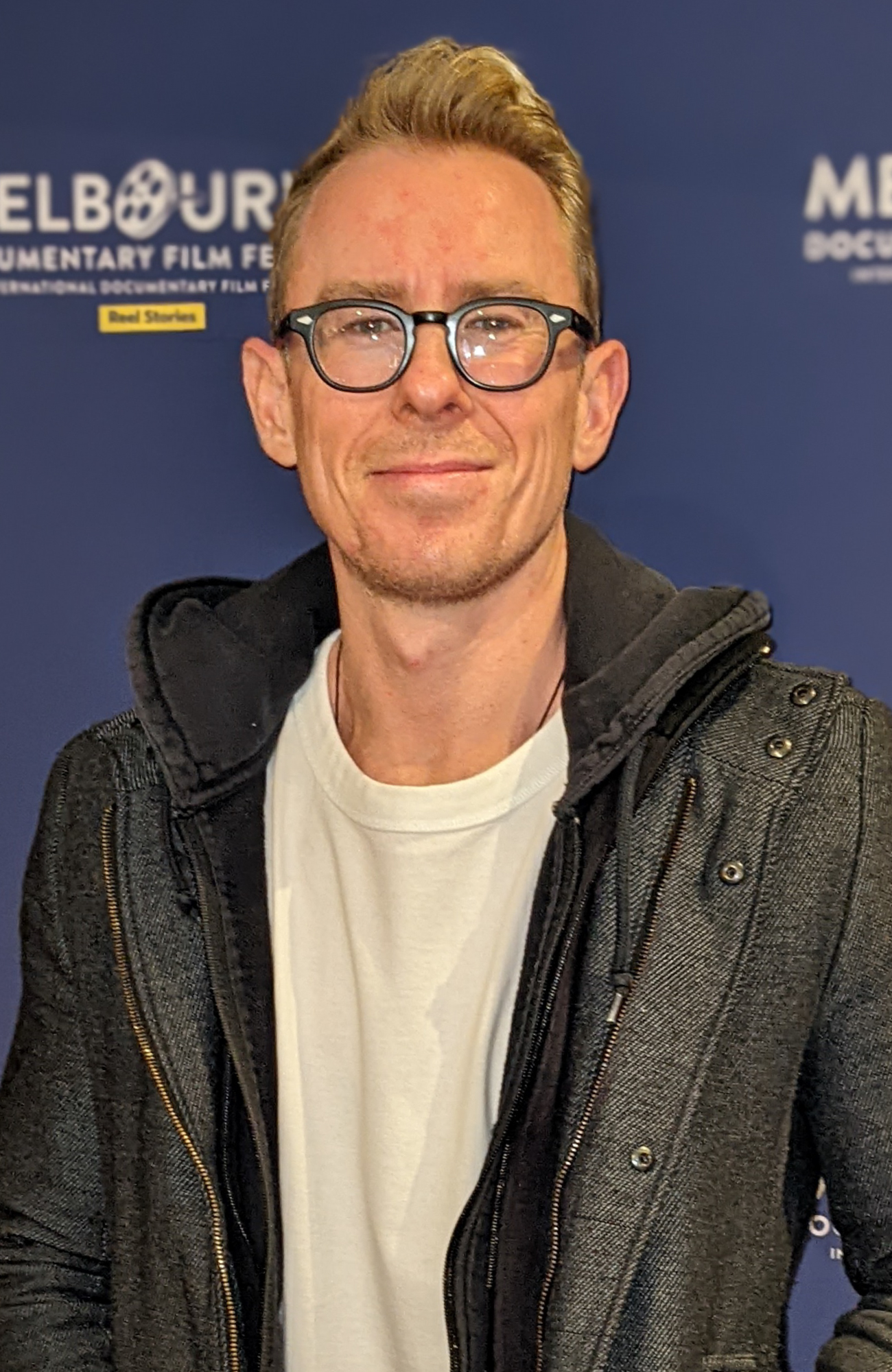
- Bauer in 2022
- Education: New York University
- Occupation: film director
- Notable work: The Other Fellow
- Website: mattbauerfilm.com

Matthew Bauer is an Australian film director, producer and writer. He is best known for his 2022 directorial debut, The Other Fellow. Bauer was longlisted for Best Debut Director (Feature Documentary) at the 2022 British Independent Film Awards.

== Early life and education ==
Bauer was born in Adelaide, Australia. He made several short films in high school before leaving law school to attend New York University Tisch School of the Arts, graduating with an MA in film and television production.

== Career ==
While at Tisch, Bauer thought of reaching out to real men whose names are James Bond and began investigating across Facebook and asking if they had any stories that he can include in his film and by interviewing them, he got unexpected life stories which became the subject of The Other Fellow that Bauer directed, wrote and produced. The film was shot over ten years.

The documentary had its world premiere at the 2022 Doc Edge Film Festival as its Opening Night Film where it won its category and was nominated for Best International Feature. It was released in cinemas in the USA on February 17, 2023, and the UK on May 19, 2023.

On the review aggregation website Rotten Tomatoes, the film holds a score of 93%, based on 27 reviews. The site's critical consensus reads: "Breezy in terms of length yet surprisingly expansive with its scope, The Other Fellow uses the experience of sharing a world-famous role to pose probing questions of privacy and identity."

== Awards and recognitions ==
Date of ceremony	Award	Category	Recipient (s)	Result	REF
2022	Doc Edge Film Festival	Best International Feature	Matthew Bauer	Nominated	
2022	Doc Edge Film Festival	And Action...	Matthew Bauer	Won	
2022	Austin Film Festival	Best Documentary Feature	Matthew Bauer	Nominated	
2022	British Independent Film Awards	Best Debut Director (Feature Documentary)	Matthew Bauer	Longlisted	
2023	National Film Awards	Best Documentary	Matthew Bauer	Nominated	
2023	Chagrin Documentary Film Festival	Human Spirit Award	Matthew Bauer	Won	
