= James Bond (ornithologist) =

American ornithologist and character namesake

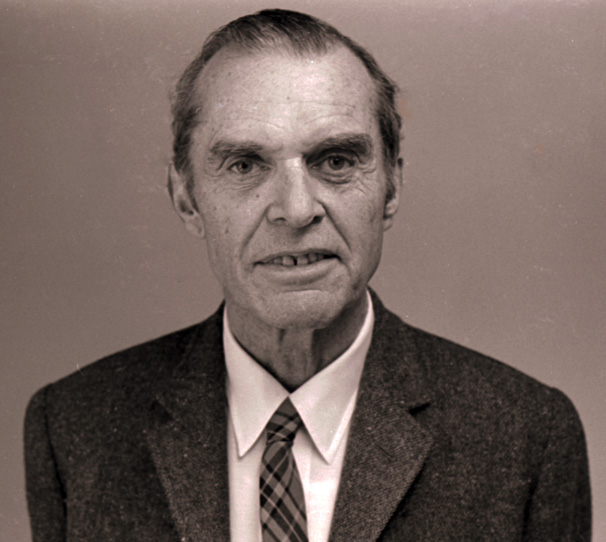
- Bond in 1974
- Born: January 4, 1900; Philadelphia, Pennsylvania, U.S.
- Died: February 14, 1989 (aged 89); Philadelphia, Pennsylvania, U.S.
- Education: Harrow School; Trinity College, Cambridge
- Occupation: Ornithologist
- Known for: Birds of the West Indies; namesake of Ian Fleming's fictional British spy
- Spouse: Mary Fanning Wickham Bond née Porcher
- Awards: Leidy Award of the Academy of Natural Sciences
- Scientific career
- Workplaces: Academy of Natural Sciences of Philadelphia
- Author abbrev. (zoology): Bond

James Bond (January 4, 1900 – February 14, 1989) was an American ornithologist and expert on the birds of the Caribbean, having written the definitive book on the subject: Birds of the West Indies, first published in 1936. He served as a curator at the Academy of Natural Sciences of Philadelphia. Writer Ian Fleming adopted his name for his fictional British spy; references to the ornithologist permeate the resulting media franchise.

== Life and career ==
Bond was born on January 4, 1900, in Philadelphia, Pennsylvania, the son of Margaret Reeves (née Tyson) and Francis Edward Bond. His interest in natural history was spurred by an expedition his father undertook in 1911 to the Orinoco Delta. Bond was educated at the Delancey School followed by St. Paul's School in Concord, New Hampshire, but after the death of his mother he moved with his father to the United Kingdom in 1914. There, he studied at Harrow and later Trinity College, Cambridge, where he obtained a B.A. in 1922 and was the sole American member of the Pitt Club.

After graduating he moved back to the United States and worked for a banking firm for three years in Philadelphia. An interest in natural history prompted him to quit, and along with Rodolphe Meyer de Schauensee, took out a loan to set out on an expedition to the Amazon to collect specimens for the Academy of Natural Sciences.

Subsequently, he worked as an ornithologist at the Academy of Natural Sciences in Philadelphia, rising to become curator of ornithology there. He was an expert in Caribbean birds and wrote the definitive book on the subject: Birds of the West Indies, first published in 1936. From the 1920s to the 1960s, he took dozens of birding explorations to the West Indies.

Bond won the Institute of Jamaica's Musgrave Medal in 1952; the Brewster Medal of the American Ornithologists' Union in 1954; and the Leidy Award of the Academy of Natural Sciences in 1975. He died in the Chestnut Hill Hospital in Philadelphia on February 14, 1989, at the age of 89. He is interred in the church yard at Church of the Messiah in Gwynedd Valley, Pennsylvania. Bond's wife, the author Mary Fanning Wickham Bond née Porcher, who wrote several memoirs about her husband, died in 1997.

== Works ==
One of Bond's early works in ornithology was through his maternal uncle Carroll Sargent Tyson Jr. (1878–1956). After the death of his mother, Bond spent time with his uncle, out in the outdoors in Mount Desert Island, Maine. In 1916, Tyson was prompted, inspired by Audubon's works, to produce large folios of the birds of Maine. Bond collected specimens of birds for his uncle to paint. This resulted in the production of 250 copies of the book The Birds of Mt. Desert Island (1941) with 20 chromolithographs.

Bond's most enduring work was his guide to the Birds of the West Indies which was first published in 1936 and went into 11 editions during his lifetime. He published nearly 150 papers in various journals including descriptions of 63 new subspecies.

James Bond noted that the distribution of hutias was limited by what he thought may have been a marine boundary. In 1973 David Lack proposed that this be called Bond's Line, a biogeographical boundary between Tobago and the Lesser Antilles that also divided birds of North and South American origin. In 2015 a new subspecies of hutia was described as Plagiodontia aedium bondi and named after Bond for his recognition of the biogeographical divide.

== Fictional namesake ==
Ian Fleming, who was a keen bird watcher living in Jamaica, was familiar with Bond's book, and chose the name of its author for the hero of Casino Royale in 1953, apparently because he wanted a name that sounded "as ordinary as possible". Fleming wrote to the real Bond's wife, "It struck me that this brief, unromantic, Anglo-Saxon and yet very masculine name was just what I needed, and so a second James Bond was born." He did not contact the real James Bond about using his name in the books, and Bond did not learn of Fleming's character until the early 1960s, when Fleming's James Bond books became popular in the U.S. In 1964 during Fleming's annual winter stay at Goldeneye in Jamaica, James Bond and his wife visited Fleming unexpectedly. In his novel Dr. No Fleming referenced Bond's work by basing a large ornithological sanctuary on Dr. No's island in the Bahamas. In 1964, Fleming gave Bond a first edition copy of You Only Live Twice signed, "To the real James Bond, from the thief of his identity". In December 2008 the book was put up for auction, eventually fetching $84,000 (£56,000).

James Bond's wife told Fleming that her husband saw the use of his name for the character as a good joke, to which Fleming replied "I can only offer your James Bond unlimited use of the name Ian Fleming...Perhaps one day he will discover some particularly horrible species of bird which he would like to christen in an insulting fashion."

In 1966, James Bond's wife, Mary Fanning Wickham Bond, published a small book, "How 007 Got His Name". It details her husband's life and discovery of the appropriation of his name along with their meeting Ian Fleming and the Hilary Brays at Goldeneye on February 5, 1964. By happenstance, the Canadian Broadcasting Corporation was filming an interview that day.

The story of James Bond and his wife, Mary Fanning Wickham Bond, discovering Ian Fleming's theft of the name, before contacting and meeting Fleming at Goldeneye is told in the 2022 documentary The Other Fellow. The film chronicles the lives of several men named James Bond and shows a film, not previously broadcast, of the Bonds meeting Fleming, as well as interviews with James and Mary that were discovered by the film's director Matthew Bauer.

In the 2002 Bond film Die Another Day, the fictional Bond, played by Pierce Brosnan, can be seen examining Birds of the West Indies in an early scene that takes place in Havana, Cuba. The author's name on the front cover is obscured. In the same film, when Bond first meets Jinx (Halle Berry), he introduces himself as an ornithologist. In the 2015 Bond film Spectre, the same book was seen in a promotional on-set photo; the book appeared in an alternate take - unused for the released film - of a scene taking place in Bond's Chelsea apartment.

In the ITV Miss Marple murder mystery "A Caribbean Mystery", broadcast on 16 June 2013, Miss Marple meets Ian Fleming at a talk on "Birds of the West Indies", given by James Bond. Before the talk begins, Fleming tells Miss Marple that he's working on a new book, but trying to come up with a name for the character. When the speaker introduced himself, Fleming has a moment of inspiration and reaches for his notebook, as the first few bars of the film theme play. The talk by the ornithologist James Bond is on guano which figures in the background and plot of the James Bond spy novel Dr. No. This instance of James Bond was played by Charlie Higson, who wrote the Young Bond novels.

== Sources ==
- "James Bond, Ornithologist, 89; Fleming Adopted Name for 007". The New York Times. Associated Press. February 17, 1989. p. D19.
- Bond, Mary Wickham (1966). How 007 Got His Name (illustrated, 2 black and white plates ed.). London, UK: Collins.
- Contosta, David R. (1993). The Private Life of James Bond. Lititz, PA: Sutter House. ISBN 978-0-915010-38-7.
- Matros, Michael (2013). "Avian Adventurer of the Caribbean". Alumni Horae. 93 (2). Archived from the original on June 26, 2015.
- Walker, Andrew (19 April 2002). "BBC NEWS : In Depth : Newsmakers : Ian Fleming: The man behind Bond – and Chitty". BBC News profiles unit.
- Wright, Jim (2020). The Real James Bond: A True Story of Identity Theft, Avian Intrigue, and Ian Fleming. Schiffer Publishing. ISBN 978-0-7643-5902-6.
