= List of Lore podcast episodes =

Lore is a podcast created by Aaron Mahnke. Mahnke uploaded the first episode of the podcast in early 2015. Each episode is a retelling of urban legends, myths, and documented tragic events.

No.	Title	Length (minutes:seconds)	Original release date
1	"They Made a Tonic"	22:15	19 March 2015
Explores folklore and legends involving vampires, including the Mercy Brown vampire incident, which occurred in Exeter, Rhode Island, in 1892.
2	"The Bloody Pit"	17:40	23 March 2015
Describes the history of the Hoosac Tunnel, a train tunnel constructed in the Berkshires between the towns of Florida and North Adams, Massachusetts, for the Troy and Greenfield Railroad, and the ghost stories associated with the tunnel.
3	"The Beast Within"	21:40	6 April 2015
Explores the folklore and legends surrounding werewolves, including the murders perpetrated by Peter Stumpp in Bedburg, Germany, between the years of 1582 and 1589.
4	"Dinner at the Afterglow"	21:15	20 April 2015
The history and ghost stories of the Hotel de Haro and the nearby Afterglow Vista – a mausoleum for the remains of John S. McMillin and his family – in the town of Roche Harbor, Washington.
5	"Under Construction"	21:45	4 May 2015
Explores the folklore and legends surrounding elves and other elf-like beings, including the huldufólk of Iceland, as well as the makiawisug of the Mohegan Tribe in Montville, Connecticut.
6	"Echoes"	22:40	18 May 2015
The history of the Danvers State Hospital, a former psychiatric hospital in Danvers, Massachusetts.
7	"In the Woods"	20:50	1 June 2015
Explores the folklore surrounding the Bridgewater Triangle – an area of land between the towns of Abington, Rehoboth, and Freetown in Massachusetts – including the story of the creatures that Bill Russo allegedly encountered while walking his dog through the Hockomock Swamp near Raynham, Massachusetts, in 1995.
8	"The Castle"	24:00	15 June 2015
Explores the life and crimes of H. H. Holmes, a serial killer who committed most of his murders in his home in Englewood, Chicago, Illinois, during the World's Columbian Exposition in 1893.
9	"A Devil on the Roof"	24:36	29 June 2015
Explores the folklore and legends surrounding the Jersey Devil of the New Jersey Pine Barrens in South Jersey, including the string of sightings that allegedly occurred throughout the region in 1909.
10	"Steam & Gas"	23:35	13 July 2015
The history and ghost stories of the Stanley Hotel in Estes Park, Colorado, including the stories surrounding Room 217.
11	"Black Stockings"	24:51	27 July 2015
Explores the folklore surrounding fairy changelings. Also describes a selection of attempted fairy exorcisms, including the burning of Bridget Cleary in Ballyvadlea, County Tipperary, Ireland, in 1895.
12	"Half-Hanged"	23:30	10 August 2015
Explores the methods in which people attempted to detect and destroy people suspected of witchcraft in the New England Colonies, including the attempted hanging of Mary Webster in Hadley, Massachusetts, in 1685.
13	"Off the Path"	22:55	24 August 2015
Explores a selection of legends involving curses, including the story of the werewolves of Ossory, in which Saint Patrick cursed the Ossory clan of the former kingdom of Osraige, near modern-day County Meath, Ireland.
14	"The Others"	24:15	7 September 2015
Continues the exploration of various cultures’ legends of little people, including the reported sightings of the Dover Demon in Dover, Massachusetts, in 1977.
15	"Unboxed"	23:10	21 September 2015
The story of Robert, a doll owned by painter Robert Eugene Otto of Key West, Florida.
16	"Covered Mirrors"	23:47	5 October 2015
Presents the story of the Villisca axe murders, which occurred in Villisca, Iowa, in 1912.
17	"Broken Fingernails"	26:15	12 October 2015
Explores some of the ghost stories and legends of a selection of cemeteries, including the story of Ruth Blay, who was hanged and buried in South Cemetery in Portsmouth, New Hampshire, in 1768, for the crime of "concealment" (i.e., the infanticide of one's illegitimate child).
18	"Hunger Pains"	23:50	19 October 2015
Explores the stories and legends surrounding the wendigo of Cree folklore, including the story of Jack Fiddler, the shaman of the Sandy Lake First Nation, located along the Severn River in Ontario, Canada.
19	"Bite Marks"	24:13	26 October 2015
Explores a selection of legends involving poltergeists, including the story of the alleged poltergeist of the Black Mausoleum (the tomb of George Mackenzie of Rosehaugh) in the Greyfriars Kirkyard in Edinburgh, Scotland.
20	"Homestead"	24:55	2 November 2015
Explores a selection of legends involving allegedly haunted houses, including the ghost stories surrounding the Daniel Benton Homestead in Tolland, Connecticut.
21	"Adrift"	23:41	16 November 2015
A selection of historical accounts of shipwreckings, including the wreck of the SS Valencia, a steamboat that sank after colliding with the cliffs near Pachena Point Light on Vancouver Island, British Columbia, in 1906.
22	"Over the Top"	25:10	30 November 2015
Describes a selection of alleged encounters with Spring-heeled Jack in London, England.
23	"Rope and Railing"	23:01	14 December 2015
The story of the incident involving Thomas Howell and Thomas Griffith, which occurred at the Smalls Lighthouse – located on the Smalls off the coast of Pembrokeshire, Wales – in 1801.
24	"A Stranger Among Us"	27:10	28 December 2015
Discusses stories and legends involving entities that reward and/or punish people during the Christmas and holiday season for their good or bad behavior. Also describes the legend of the Pied Piper of Hamelin that allegedly visited Hamelin, Germany, in 1284.
25	"The Cave"	23:15	11 January 2016
The stories and legends surrounding the Warlock of Chiloé, a mafia-like cult of alleged warlocks on the island of Chiloé Island off the coast of Chile, including the story of the imbunche, a deformed human that the cult supposedly creates to guard their caves.
26	"Brought Back"	24:40	25 January 2016
Explores stories and legends involving zombies, including the story of Clairvius Narcisse, who was allegedly turned into a zombie after he seemingly died in Haiti in 1962.
27	"On the Farm"	24:18	8 February 2016
Explores the circumstances surrounding the Hinterkaifeck murders, in which an unknown assailant murdered Andreas Gruber and his family on their isolated farmstead near Waidhofen, Bavaria, Germany, in 1922.
28	"Making a Mark"	25:01	22 February 2016
Explores a selection of stories and legends from the Outer Banks of North Carolina, including the story of the witch-trial of a woman named Cora and her infant in the town of Frisco on Hatteras Island.
29	"The Big Chill"	24:46	7 March 2016
Relates several ghost stories from the coast of Maine, including the ghost stories surrounding Owls Head Light in the town of Owls Head, Maine, on the Penobscot Bay.
30	"Deep and Twisted Roots"	30:01	21 March 2016
Explores the origins of modern-day notions about vampires, including the story of Arnold Paole, which occurred near the town of Paraćin, Serbia, in 1726 and 1732.
31	"Lost and Found"	29:06	4 April 2016
Explores the murder of Julia Martha Thomas, which was perpetrated by Kate Webster in Richmond, London, in 1879.
32	"Tampered"	25:25	18 April 2016
A selection of alleged accounts of gremlins, including a sighting reported by a former Boeing B-17 Flying Fortress aircraft pilot from Jonesboro, Arkansas, as well as an incident that supposedly occurred at an air base in San Diego, California, in 1939.
33	"A Dead End"	26:51	2 May 2016
A selection of folktales and legends from Richmond, Virginia, including the story of the Richmond Vampire, which supposedly emerged from the Church Hill Tunnel and wandered into the Hollywood Cemetery in 1925.
34	"All the Lovely Ladies"	25:50	16 May 2016
The story of the life of Elizabeth Báthory, a countess who was convicted of the torture and murder of around 80 young women in Čachtice Castle near modern-day Čachtice, Slovakia, between the years of 1580 and 1610.
35	"The King"	25:20	31 May 2016
The history of Clipperton Island, including the story of the rebellion led by Alicia Arnaud and Tirza Rendon against lighthouse keeper Victoriano Álvarez in 1917.
36	"When the Bow Breaks"	24:46	13 June 2016
The history of the RMS Queen Mary – an ocean liner docked in Long Beach, California – and the ghost stories associated with the ship.
37	"Passing Notes"	31:15	27 June 2016
The ghost stories associated with the Phelps Mansion in Stratford, Connecticut, including the story of the séance that was conducted there.
38	"The Mountain"	23:51	11 July 2016
Explores the circumstances surrounding the Dyatlov Pass incident, in which a group of hikers – all college students from Ural State Technical University – were found dead on Kholat Syakhl in Russia in 1959.
39	"Take the Stand"	25:05	25 July 2016
The story of the Greenbrier Ghost, which occurred in Greenbrier County, West Virginia, in 1897. According to the story, Edward Shue was convicted for the murder of his wife, Elva Zona Heaster. In court, Elva's mother testified that her daughter's ghost had visited her in the night, and had told her that Edward had murdered her after enduring months of physical abuse.
40	"Everything Floats"	26:23	8 August 2016
A selection of stories and legends from New Orleans, Louisiana, including the story of the Louisiana Voodoo Queen Marie Laveau, as well as the story of the alleged sultan who was murdered at the mansion on the corner of Dauphine Street and Orleans Avenue.
41	"Hole in the Wall"	24:58	22 August 2016
Explores the circumstances surrounding the trials of the Paisley witches, which occurred in Paisley, Renfrewshire, Scotland, in 1697.
42	"In the Bag"	26:06	5 September 2016
The history and legends of the Eastern State Penitentiary in Philadelphia, Pennsylvania.
43	"Supply and Demand"	29:58	19 September 2016
Explores the circumstances surrounding the Burke and Hare murders, in which two body snatchers (also known as "resurrectionists") sold their victims’ bodies as cadavers in Edinburgh, Scotland, in 1828.
44	"From Within"	28:45	3 October 2016
A selection of alleged cases of spontaneous human combustion, including the story of Mary Reeser in St. Petersburg, Florida, in 1951.
45	"First Impressions"	29:15	17 October 2016
Explores the circumstances surrounding the hoax perpetrated by Mary Toft in Godalming, England, in 1726, in which Toft convinced several physicians that she was giving birth to rabbits.
46	"Dark Conclusions"	28:20	31 October 2016
Explores a selection of examples of monster hunters of various sorts throughout history, including David Farrant and Seán Manchester, who hunted for occultists and the Highgate Vampire in the Highgate Cemetery of London, England, between the years of 1969 and 1974.
47	"Missing the Point"	28:41	14 November 2016
Explores a selection of alleged sightings of the Mothman in Point Pleasant, West Virginia, and other surrounding areas near the Ohio River between the years of 1966 and 1967. Also discusses the supposed connection between these sightings and the collapse of the Silver Bridge in Point Pleasant in 1967.
48	"Downriver"	25:46	28 November 2016
A selection of stories and legends about cities and towns that are said to be cursed, including the town of Kaskaskia, Illinois, on the Mississippi River. In 1844 and 1888, the river flooded and devastated the town, allegedly due to a curse placed on the town.
49	"Seeing Double"	26:11	12 December 2016
The life and exploits of William Brodie, a town councillor who lived a double-life as a thief, including his execution by hanging at the Old Tolbooth, Edinburgh, Scotland, in 1788.
50	"Mary, Mary"	30:40	23 December 2016
The story of the Watseka Wonder, in which 13-year-old Mary Lurancy Vennum was supposedly spirit possessed by the ghost of 19-year-old Mary Roff in Watseka, Illinois, in 1878.
51	"Within the Walls"	29:25	9 January 2017
Explores the history of several castles in the United Kingdom, as well as the legends associated with those castles, including the legend of Thomas Lyon-Bowes, Master of Glamis (also known as the Monster of Glamis Castle), in Glamis, Scotland.
52	"Negative Consequences"	28:11	23 January 2017
The life of Lonely hearts killer Belle Gunness. Between the years of 1906 and 1908, Gunness used personal advertisements to lure over 40 men to her farm in La Porte, Indiana, murdered them via Strychnine poisoning, and hid their bodies on her farm.
53	"Trees and Shadows"	27:21	6 February 2017
Explores a selection of alleged sightings of the Beast of Bray Road, which has been reported by multiple eyewitnesses driving down Bray Road near Elkhorn, Wisconsin.
54	"Teacher's Pet"	28:01	20 February 2017
A selection of stories and legends involving doppelgängers, including the story of Émilie Sagée, a teacher at the Pensionat Neuwelcke – a finishing school for girls – in Valmiera, Latvia, whose doppelgänger was allegedly sighted by many of her students in 1845.
55	"A Way Inside"	29:00	6 March 2017
A selection of ghost stories and legends from Boston, Massachusetts, including the stories associated with the Omni Parker House, as well as the legend of the attempted prison escape at Fort Warren on Georges Island during the American Civil War.
56	"Going Viral"	26:23	20 March 2017
Explores the legend of the Bell Witch. According to the legend, beginning in 1817, an unknown spirit haunted the Bell family's farm near the Red River in Tennessee, and even managed to kill the head of the family, John Bell, in 1820.
57	"Quarantine"	26:30	3 April 2017
An exploration of the circumstances surrounding the Loudun possessions, in which a priest named Urbain Grandier was tried, convicted, and executed for allegedly making a Deal with the Devil in Loudun, France, in 1633.
58	"The Devil's Beat"	25:43	17 April 2017
Explores the story of the Drummer of Tedworth, in which the family of a former military officer, John Mompesson, allegedly experienced poltergeist-like phenomena in their house in Tidworth, England, beginning in 1662.
59	"A Deep Fear"	27:21	1 May 2017
A selection of stories and legends involving sea monsters, including the stories of the Gloucester sea serpent of Gloucester, Massachusetts, and the attempts to hunt and kill the creature in 1817.
60	"If Walls Could Talk"	25:35	15 May 2017
The history of the Trans-Allegheny Lunatic Asylum in Weston, West Virginia, as well as the ghost stories associated with the building.
61	"Labor Pains"	28:45	29 May 2017
The story of the New Motive Power, which was created by spiritualist John Murray Spear in 1853 on High Rock Tower Reservation in Lynn, Massachusetts. Also discusses the machine's alleged vandalism at the hands of a mob in Randolph, New York.
62	"Desperate Measures"	26:35	12 June 2017
Explores the circumstances surrounding the murder of pow-wow practitioner Nelson Rehmeyer in Rehmeyer's Hollow, about 12 miles south of York, Pennsylvania, in 1928. Rehmeyer was killed by John Blymire, John Curry, and Wilbert Hess, because they believed that Rehmeyer had placed a hex on Blymire and Hess.
63	"Homecoming"	29:00	26 June 2017
Explores the exploits and schemes of H. H. Holmes after he abandoned his "castle" property in Chicago, Illinois, including the murder of his partner Benjamin Pitezel in Philadelphia, Pennsylvania, as well as that of three of Pitezel's five children in Toronto, Ontario, and Indianapolis, Indiana.
64	"Behind Closed Doors"	27:15	10 July 2017
A selection of stories and legends of New York City, including the story of Loyalist William Axtell, his mistress Isabelle, and his slave Miranda in his Melrose Hall, in Flatbush, Brooklyn. According to the legend, in 1777, Axtell returned to Melrose Hall after serving in the Battle of Long Island, and encountered the ghost of Isabelle, who had been trapped in a secret chamber for a full year during Axtell's service in the battle.
65	"Doing Tricks"	28:20	24 July 2017
An exploration of tricksters in folklore and mythology, including the Nain Rouge, and the curse it supposedly placed upon the city of Detroit, Michigan, as well as upon the city's founder, Antoine de la Mothe Cadillac, in 1707.
66	"Where There's Smoke"	27:10	7 August 2017
Explores the circumstances surrounding the Great Amherst Mystery, in which a woman named Esther Cox was supposedly haunted by a poltergeist-like entity in Amherst, Nova Scotia, between the years of 1878–79. Throughout that time, the entity allegedly threatened to burn Cox alive.
67	"The Red Coats"	29:14	21 August 2017
A selection of legends associated with the Bennington Triangle, an area of Forested land near the towns of Bennington and Glastenbury, Vermont. A number of deaths and cases of missing people have occurred in the area around Glastenbury Mountain: Carl Herrick in 1943; Middie Rivers in 1945; Paula Jean Welden, who was last seen on the Long Trail in 1946; eight-year-old Paul Jephson in 1950; and Frieda Langer that same year.
68	"The Tainted Well"	30:06	4 September 2017
A selection of stories and legends from the island of Ireland, including the stories associated with Leap Castle in County Offaly. One of the stories associated with the castle is novelist Mildred Darby's alleged encounter with a monster at her bedroom door; she published a written account of her experience in the journal The Occult Review in 1908.
69	"Wide Open"	29:54	18 September 2017
An exploration of stories and legends involving flying monsters, including the Van Meter Visitor, a creature that was allegedly spotted by a number of eyewitnesses in Van Meter, Iowa, in 1903.
70	"Familiar"	31:20	2 October 2017
Describes the life and career of Matthew Hopkins, a witch-hunter who practiced mostly around Suffolk, England, during the English Civil War. Hopkins was partly responsible for the executions of more than 100 people, including the death by burning of Mary Lakeland in Ipswich in 1645.
71	"Silver Lining"	30:33	16 October 2017
Describes the moral panic surrounding the animal attacks attributed to the Beast of Gévaudan, and the people who attempted to hunt down and kill the beast, including Jean Chastel, a peasant farmer from Mont Mouchet, who managed to kill the beast near his farm in 1767.
72	"A Grave Mistake"	43:06	30 October 2017
Describes some of the measures people employed to prevent premature burial. Also relates the story of Mary Howe, a spiritualist woman living in Damariscotta, Maine: In 1882, Howe either died or slipped into a sleep-like trance, and was later buried, possibly alive.
73	"A Sweet Embrace"	35:35	13 November 2017
The story of the life of serial killer Jane Toppan, a nurse who poisoned most of her victims with morphine. In 1901, Kelley gradually murdered the entire Davis family in Cambridge and Cape Cod, Massachusetts.
74	"All Fall Down"	30:00	27 November 2017
Explores a selection of cases of unexplained weather phenomena, including the Kentucky meat shower, an incident that occurred in 1876 in Olympia State Forest in Kentucky, in which chunks of meat fell from the sky.
75	"Black and Wild"	28:35	11 December 2017
Describes the exploits of two men from London, England: John Dee, a self-proclaimed scientist who served under Elizabeth I of England; and Edward Kelley, a confidence trickster who claimed to be able to talk to angels, as well as having other powers of divination.
76	"Talk Show"	30:35	22 December 2017
Explores the circumstances surrounding the events that occurred in Sullivan, Maine, in 1799–1800, in which a "specter" claiming to be the late Eleanor Butler – who had died in childbirth – had come back to deliver messages and sermons to the town.
77	"Withering Heights"	28:44	8 January 2018
Discusses the history and hauntings of the Waverly Hills Sanatorium, a former tuberculosis sanatorium in Louisville, Kentucky.
78	"Exposure"	36:18	22 January 2018
The story of William H. Mumler, a spirit photographer working in Boston, Massachusetts, and New York City. Mumler was eventually charged with fraud; he was held in the Tombs in New York City while awaiting his trial in 1869.
79	"Locked Away"	31:39	5 February 2018
The story of the life of Sarah Winchester, and the construction of her Winchester Mystery House in the Santa Clara Valley in California, between the years of 1886 and 1922.
80	"Dark Imports"	33:40	19 February 2018
The history of Savannah, Georgia, as well as several ghost stories from the city, including the story of the ghost of Alice Riley, who was hanged from a tree in Wright Square in 1735.
81	"On the Edge"	33:08	5 March 2018
Explores a selection of unexplained disease outbreaks, including the 1951 Pont-Saint-Esprit mass poisoning, which occurred in Pont-Saint-Esprit, France, and which was possibly caused by contaminated white bread flour.
82	"Forgotten"	33:16	19 March 2018
Explores the histories of a selection of ghost towns, including the specific reason each town declined, as well as the particular ghost stories associated with those towns. One such town is Avilla, Missouri, which contains the story of Rotten Johnny Reb, the ghost of a Confederate States Army soldier who was killed and decapitated in the town.
83	"Carried Away"	34:32	2 April 2018
Explores the significance of curses in the folklore of the Romani people (also known derogatorily as "Gypsies"). Also explores the supposed link between a Romani curse and the circumstances surrounding the death of actor Charles Coghlan. According to the story, when he was a young man, Coghlan visited a Romani fortune-teller who told him that he would "be famous...but at the height of that fame, it would all come to an end with his tragic death. After that, his soul would wander until it could return home." In 1899, Coghlan died in Galveston, Texas, and his body was placed in a coffin in a temporary vault. The next year, the Great Galveston hurricane swept Coghlan's coffin out to sea. Eight years later, in 1908, his coffin was found on the coast of Prince Edward Island, Canada, where Coghlan had felt most at home during his life.
84	"A Family Affair"	33:49	16 April 2018
Describes the interactions between the supposedly clairvoyant Eddy Brothers and skeptic Henry Steel Olcott in Chittenden, Vermont, in 1874.
85	"Creature of Habit"	34:50	30 April 2018
A selection of ghost stories from the Borley Rectory, a former clergy house in Borley, England.
86	"Under Siege"	38:07	14 May 2018
Explores the life of Irish-born cook Mary Mallon, an asymptomatic carrier of typhoid fever who was imprisoned on North Brother Island in New York City, to prevent her from infecting people living on the mainland.
87	"Road Trip"	37:44	28 May 2018
The story of the alleged alien abduction of Barney and Betty Hill in the White Mountains near Lancaster, New Hampshire, in 1961.
88	"Crossing the Line"	40:25	11 June 2018
Explores a selection of historical instances in which people have attempted to artificially create living beings, or to bring the dead back to life, and also discusses the unusual methods people have used to seek companionship. One such story involves Carl Tanzler, a German-born radiographer living in Key West, Florida. In 1933, Tanzler stole the body of a deceased woman named Elena, and attempted to keep her corpse preserved in his bed. He managed to keep the body in his home for seven years, until Elena's sister discovered it in Tanzler's bed in 1940.
89	"Fanning the Flames"	33:46	25 June 2018
A selection of ghost stories and legends from Chicago, Illinois, including the stories surrounding the Hull House.
90	"Mind the Gap"	39:07	9 July 2018
Explores various cultures’ legends of lake monsters, including the creature dubbed "Champ" that allegedly lives in Lake Champlain, on the borders of New York State, Vermont, and Quebec.
91	"Beneath the Surface"	31:23	23 July 2018
Explores the history and ghost stories of Mackinac Island, Michigan, including the ghost stories and legends of the Grand Hotel.
92	"Stronger"	31:25	6 August 2018
The story of the life of Mollie Fancher, a so-called "fasting girl" living in Brooklyn, New York, who supposedly developed the ability of "second sight" after suffering several accidents that rendered her bedridden. Also discusses physician William A. Hammond's attempts to expose Fancher as a fraud.
93	"A Place to Lay Your Head"	32:00	20 August 2018
Explores the circumstances surrounding the murders committed by the Bloody Benders. Many of the Benders’ murder victims were discovered on their abandoned farm along the Great Osage Trail in Labette County, Kansas, in 1873.
94	"Hard Rain"	32:55	3 September 2018
An exploration of the Lithobolia, an account written by Richard Chamberlayne – the royal secretary of the Province of New Hampshire – and published in London in 1698. Chamberlayne's account describes the property dispute between George Walton and Hannah Jones – who Walton accused of witchcraft – on Great Island (modern-day New Castle, New Hampshire) in 1682.
95	"Out of Sight"	32:14	17 September 2018
Explores a selection of cases in which people have gone missing, including a case in which a captain and his valet disappeared. According to the story, the captain and valet looked very similar. One night in 1812, in the city of Danzig, Poland, the captain was found dead in his room after a night of heavy drinking. The valet swapped clothes with the dead captain, and assumed the captain's identity. Two years later, in 1814, the valet (disguised as the captain) was charged with theft, and sentenced to prison in western France, where he later went missing.
96	"The Long Good-Bye"	35:00	1 October 2018
The story of the life, travels, and performances of spiritualist Daniel Dunglas Home, who could allegedly predict the future, speak with the dead, and was capable of levitation.
97	"Misplaced"	33:34	8 October 2018
Describes the circumstances surrounding the trial of Stephen and Jesse Boorn, which occurred in Manchester, Vermont, in 1819. The two brothers were convicted of murdering their sibling-in-law, Russell Colvin, seven years prior; Jesse was sentenced to life imprisonment, while Stephen was sentenced to death by hanging. Before Stephen's execution could be carried out, a man claiming to be the murdered Russell Colvin was found living in Dover, New Jersey; he was brought to Manchester, and the brothers were cleared of their charges and freed.
98	"Never Alone"	36:11	15 October 2018
The history, stories, and legends of Seattle, Washington, including the ghost stories surrounding the Peter Gessner mansion (also known as the "Castle"), located in Pioneer Square within the Georgetown neighborhood.
99	"Out for Blood"	31:13	22 October 2018
A selection of stories and legends about vampire-like creatures that feed on blood, including the chupacabra. Also describes the string of cattle mutilations attributed to the chupacabra, which occurred throughout Puerto Rico (beginning in Lajas) in 1998.
100	"Home Sweet Home"	43:24	29 October 2018
Explores the circumstances surrounding the supposed haunting of a house in the village of Hydesville (now part of Arcadia, New York) in 1848. According to the legend, the house was allegedly haunted by the ghost of a murdered peddler. The house was owned by John and Margaret Fox, the parents of the Fox Sisters. According to the episode, the reports of the haunting within this house played an important role in the founding of Spiritualism.
101	"Worn Away"	33:42	12 November 2018
A selection of stories and legends involving the entity from Navajo folklore known as the skin-walker, including the sightings reported by Tom Gorman and his family, which occurred in 1994 on their ranch (known as Skinwalker Ranch) in the Uintah Basin in Utah.
102	"Devil in the Details"	33:52	26 November 2018
The story of Walburga Oesterreich, who was charged with the shooting death of her husband Fred in Los Angeles, California, in 1922. Fred had actually been shot by Otto Sanhuber, one of Dolly's many extramarital sex partners, who had been living in the attic of the Oesterreich home for nearly a decade.
103	"Disappointment"	34:02	10 December 2018
The history and ghost stories of the Crescent Hotel in Eureka Springs, Arkansas, including the story of Michael, the alleged ghost of an Irish stonemason who is said to haunt Room 218.
104	"Anchored"	32:00	21 December 2018
The stories and legends of the Dash, a ghost ship that allegedly haunts Casco Bay in Maine, including the sighting reported by Homer Grimm and his mistress in 1942.
105	"Layers"	37:41	7 January 2019
The story of Florence Cook, a medium in London, England, who claimed to be able to materialize spirits; also tells of her eventual exposure as a fraud in 1875.
106	"The Collection"	34:29	21 January 2019
The history of the West Virginia Penitentiary in Moundsville, West Virginia, as well as the ghost stories associated with the building.
107	"Sight Unseen"	44:21	4 February 2019
The story of Herman Billik, a Czech charmer and fortune-teller living in Pilsen, Chicago, Illinois, including his trial for the arsenic poisoning of the Vrzal family in 1905–1906.
108	"Debris"	35:33	18 February 2019
A selection of stories and legends involving sea monsters, including the alleged sighting of a sea serpent reported by Arthur Rostron – Chief mate of the RMS Campania – in 1907, as well as the additional sightings that seemed to corroborate Rostron's descriptions of the creature.
109	"Assumption"	33:56	4 March 2019
The story of the murder of Captain Joseph White, which occurred in Salem, Massachusetts, in 1830. Also discusses the events following the arrest of the primary suspects: Richard and George Crowninshield, as well as Frank and Joseph Knapp, Jr., who had hired the Crowninshield brothers to murder White.
110	"Crooked"	35:29	18 March 2019
The history and legends of Washington, D.C., including the legends surrounding the White House. One of those legends involves the attempts by Mary Todd Lincoln – wife of President Abraham Lincoln – to contact her deceased son William Wallace Lincoln, who had died of typhoid fever in 1862.
111	"Inside Job"	36:33	1 April 2019
The life of Lucy Ainsworth Cooke (also known as "Sleeping Lucy"), an alleged clairvoyant in rural Vermont who claimed to be able to use her dreams to heal people, to help people find missing objects, and to aid the police in locating missing people, until her death in 1895.
112	"Facets"	35:26	15 April 2019
Explores a selection of stories involving various versions of the banshee, including La Llorona of Mexico.
113	"Word of Mouth"	37:16	29 April 2019
Explores various cases of medicinal human cannibalism throughout history, including an incident witnessed and recorded by writer John Ross Browne in Hanau, Germany, in 1861. According to Browne, immediately after the public decapitation of a local farmer, several onlookers gathered to his corpse to drink the blood, due to the belief that ingesting executed criminals’ blood could treat epilepsy and other ailments.
114	"The Gateway"	39:16	13 May 2019
The history, legends, and ghost stories associated with the Alamo Mission in San Antonio, Texas.
115	"Perspective"	37:59	27 May 2019
An account of the Gloucester Spectres, a group of seemingly immortal strangers who supposedly harassed a garrison of soldiers in Gloucester, Massachusetts, in 1692.
116	"Something Blue"	36:39	10 June 2019
The story of the life of Linda Hazzard, a con artist who operated a sanatorium in Olalla, Washington. Hazzard prescribed her patients with fasting treatments, and then took her patients’ money and possessions after they died of starvation. In 1912, Hazzard was convicted of manslaughter for the deaths of her patients.
117	"Bones"	35:38	24 June 2019
The history and legends associated with a selection of castles in Japan, including Himeji Castle, also known as the White Heron. According to one of the legends of Himeji Castle, known as Banchō Sarayashiki, a woman named Okiku was falsely accused of breaking one of Lord Norimoto's ten priceless tableware, and was tortured, executed, and thrown into a well on the castle grounds. Okiku's ghost now supposedly haunts the well.
118	"Ambition"	33:33	8 July 2019
The story of the life of La Voisin – a French palmist and physiognomist – and her involvement in the Affair of the Poisons. Also recounts La Voisin's execution by burning in Paris, France, in 1680.
119	"Evolution"	36:28	22 July 2019
A collection of stories and legends involving the Goatman of the Henry A. Wallace Beltsville Agricultural Research Center, including the string of sightings that allegedly occurred in Prince George's County, Maryland, in the 1970s and 1980s.
120	"Whistle While You Work"	37:19	5 August 2019
Explores a selection of stories and legends of beings that are associated with mining, such as knockers and kobolds. Also discusses the mining accident that occurred in the Milford Mine in Crosby, Minnesota, in 1924, and the ghost stories associated with the disaster.
121	"Uninvited Guest"	38:19	19 August 2019
An exploration of human parasites and the roles they have played in human history. As an example, the episode describes how Henry Morton Stanley contributed to the spread of African trypanosomiasis throughout Africa in the 1880s–1890s.
122	"The Shortest Straw"	37:46	2 September 2019
Explores the dynamics surrounding the custom of shipwrecked sailors to resort to cannibalism at sea to survive while lost at sea. Also discusses the case of R v Dudley and Stephens, in which sailors Tom Dudley and Edwin Stephens were tried for the murder and cannibalism of cabin boy Richard Parker while lost at sea after a shipwreck.
123	"Unnoticed"	34:05	16 September 2019
The history of the Mount Washington Hotel on Mount Washington in New Hampshire, as well as the ghost stories and legends associated with the building.
124	"To Die For"	35:34	30 September 2019
Explores the lengths that people have undergone to achieve cultural standards of beauty. Also discusses the structure fire that killed nine ballet dancers at the Continental Theatre in Philadelphia, Pennsylvania, in 1861.
125	"Paper Trails"	34:20	7 October 2019
Explores the life of lonely hearts serial killer Johann Otto Hoch, who married and murdered an unknown number of women, including Caroline Hoch of Wheeling, West Virginia, in 1895. Johann was captured in New York City in 1905, and was hanged in Chicago, Illinois, in 1906.
126	"Aftershocks"	37:30	14 October 2019
Explores the history, ghost stories, and legends of Charleston, South Carolina, including the story of highwaywoman and serial killer Lavinia Fisher.
127	"Tipping the Scales"	33:34	21 October 2019
Explores a selection of legends involving belief in the curse of the pharaohs, including the story of Walter Herbert Ingram, Sir Henry Bruce Meux, 3rd Baronet, and Valerie, Lady Meux. Ingram gifted an Ancient Egyptian mummy to the Meuxes in 1886. A couple of years later, Ingram was killed by elephants while hunting in Somalia, and Sir and Lady Meux failed to produce an heir, supposedly due to a curse from the mummy.
128	"A Hole in the Head"	37:44	28 October 2019
Explores a selection of examples of divination used throughout history, including the practice of trial by ordeal. One example of this practice was cruentation, also known as "trial by blood." The episode describes an incident in Ohio in 1818, in which cruentation was used to identify the murderer of a man named Louis Sartain.
129	"Digging Deep"	35:47	11 November 2019
An exploration of the history, ghost stories, and legends of London, England, including the stories surrounding the house at 50 Berkeley Square.
130	"In Plain Sight"	37:03	25 November 2019
An exploration of the history of bestiaries, and the legendary creatures featured in them, such as the basilisk. The episode also describes an incident that allegedly occurred in Warsaw, Poland, in 1587, in which a man named Johann Faurer was said to have captured a basilisk after it had killed several townspeople.
131	"Sea of Change"	36:04	9 December 2019
A discussion of stories of ghost ships throughout history, including the stories of the SS Baychimo, which was allegedly spotted numerous times off the coast of Alaska after it was abandoned in 1931.
132	"Puzzled"	35:48	23 December 2019
The history and legends of Rye, East Sussex, England, including the ghost stories associated with The Mermaid Inn.
133	"Proof Positive"	36:16	6 January 2020
The story of the Devil of Glenluce, which allegedly occurred in Glenluce, Scotland, in 1654, and which scientist George Sinclair recorded in his 1672 book Hydrostaticks.
134	"Disturbing the Peace"	34:30	20 January 2020
An exploration of the practice of body snatching in the history of the United States. The episode also describes the circumstances surrounding the 1788 doctors' riot in New York City.
135	"A Good Death"	35:45	3 February 2020
The history and legends of Gettysburg, Pennsylvania, including the ghost stories associated with The Farnsworth House Inn.
136	"The Third Time"	36:06	17 February 2020
An exploration of stories about black dogs, including a story of the Black Dog of the Hanging Hills in Connecticut.
137	"Elusive"	33:06	2 March 2020
An exploration of the Kelly–Hopkinsville encounter, which allegedly occurred in Kelly and Hopkinsville, Kentucky, in 1955.
138	"Foresight"	33:58	16 March 2020
Humanity has grown over the millennia by passing on knowledge through teachings and guides. Even today, how-to books are best-sellers, and people are more hungry than ever to learn and grow. But some lessons aren't worth passing on, and in a few cases, they’ve even been incredibly destructive. A continuation of the exploration of witch-trials throughout history, including the execution of Janet Boyman in Edinburgh, Scotland, in 1572.
139	"Heirloom"	36:21	30 March 2020
The history and legends of Philadelphia, Pennsylvania, including the history of the Philadelphia State Hospital at Byberry.
140	"Potential"	35:51	13 April 2020
An exploration of the Triora Witch Trials, which took place in Triora, Italy, in 1587–89.
141	"Stains"	34:30	27 April 2020
A brief exploration of the history and legends of Paris, France, including the story of a barber and the owner of a pâtisserie who murdered and butchered a number of their customers until their crimes were discovered in 1430.
142	"Reflections"	35:30	11 May 2020
An exploration of legends and historical accounts involving twins, including Gillian and Jennifer Pollock, a pair of twins who developed a number of similarities to their deceased sisters Joanna and Jacqueline (also twins), who had been killed in a car accident in Hexham, England, in 1957.
143	"Inside Information"	36:37	25 May 2020
An exploration of ghost stories from cultures around the world, including the story of the ghost of John, Lord Tyrone. According to the legend, John's ghost appeared to his adopted sister Nichola (also known as Lady Beresford) in Gill Hall, near Dromore, Northern Ireland, on the night of his death in 1693. The legend claims that John's ghost made a number of predictions to Nichola, which allegedly came true.
144	"Birds of Prey"	37:08	8 June 2020
An exploration of the life of Matthias Schaumboch (died 1879), a tavern keeper and alleged serial killer who supposedly murdered a number of peddlers in Schaumboch's Tavern on Hawk Mountain in Pennsylvania.
145	"Invention"	33:09	22 June 2020
An exploration of the life of Eliza Jumel, who was born in poverty, but who became one of the richest and most powerful women in the United States by the time she died in 1865. The episode also explores a few of the ghost stories and legends associated with her former home, the Morris–Jumel Mansion near Harlem, New York City.
146	"A Great Weight"	33:22	6 July 2020
An exploration of the folklore and legends associated with nightmares and sleep paralysis, including the alleged experiences of Catherine Bowen in Glamorgan, Wales, during the English Civil War, as recorded by theologian Richard Baxter.
147	"Contained"	37:57	20 July 2020
The history and legends of a selection of castles in Ireland, including the legends associated with Loftus Hall in County Wexford.
148	"Predictable"	34:53	3 August 2020
The story of the conspiracy against Henry VI of England, in which Eleanor, Duchess of Gloucester, consulted Margery Jourdemayne (also known as the "Witch of Eye") and astrologers Thomas Southwell and Roger Bolingbroke to predict the date of King Henry's death. In 1441, the conspirators were arrested and convicted of "treasonable necromancy". Jourdemayne was burned at the stake, Eleanor was stripped of her power, and Bolingbroke was hanged, drawn and quartered.
149	"Off Track"	37:40	17 August 2020
An exploration of various legends associated with rail transport, including the 1891 railway accident on the Bostian Bridge near Statesville, North Carolina, and the legend of the alleged ghost train that is associated with the accident.
150	"Addition"	38:20	31 August 2020
Continues the exploration of the history and legends of New Orleans, Louisiana, including the life and crimes of Delphine LaLaurie, and the legends associated with her mansion on Royal Street.
151	"By the Book"	38:01	14 September 2020
An exploration of the history of grimoires, including the one supposedly used by mathematician Michael Scot, known as the Book of Might. The episode also describes the supposed circumstances of Scot's death in Toledo, Spain, in 1232.
152	"Follow the Leader"	33:54	28 September 2020
An exploration of stories and legends depicting the Wild Hunt, including stories of alleged encounters with Herne the Hunter in Windsor Great Park in England, one of which is said to have occurred as recently as 1926.
153	"Hold On"	33:19	5 October 2020
An exploration of the history and legends of Baltimore, Maryland, including the ghost stories associated with Hampton National Historic Site.
154	"Adding It Up"	34:52	12 October 2020
An exploration of various superstitions from a selection of cultures, and the stories associated with those superstitions, including the story of Arnold Schoenberg, a composer and music teacher at the University of California, Los Angeles, who had triskaidekaphobia, the fear of the number 13.
155	"Skin Deep"	35:14	19 October 2020
Continues the exploration of werewolves in folklore and court documents, including the trial and execution of Jacques Bocquet.
156	"Bottled Up"	35:24	26 October 2020
An exploration of stories of witches and cunning folk in Canewdon, England, including the stories surrounding George Pickingill.
157	"Hanging On"	43:14	9 November 2020
An exploration of people throughout history who sought immortality, including a small number who supposedly succeeded, such as William Cragh, who allegedly came back to life after being hanged in Swansea, Wales, in 1290.
158	"A Grain of Truth"	35:34	23 November 2020
The history and legends of Victoria, British Columbia, and surrounding Vancouver Island, including the stories of Cadborosaurus, and the discovery of an alleged Cadborosaurus carcass in 1937.
159	"Close By"	38:05	7 December 2020
The history and ghost stories of Edinburgh, including the ghost stories associated with Mary King's Close.
160	"Sleight of Hand"	35:33	21 December 2020
A selection of stories, legends, and historical accounts of alleged magicians and sorcerers, including Johann Georg Faust.
161	"Shell Game"	37:18	4 January 2021
A selection of stories, legends, and folklore associated with war and human conflict, including the story of the Angels of Mons, in which soldiers in the British Army reported seeing angels fight alongside them during the Battle of Mons in Belgium in 1914.
162	"By Design"	36:20	18 January 2021
The histories and legends associated with a selection of European castles, including Houska Castle in Bohemia.
163	"Persistence"	32:50	1 February 2021
An exploration of the circumstances surrounding the witch-trial of Elizabeth Morse in modern-day Newburyport, Massachusetts, in 1680–81.
164	"Loyal Companion"	32:35	15 February 2021
An exploration of stories and legends involving alleged familiars, including the propaganda and rumors surrounding Prince Rupert of the Rhine and his dog, Boy.
165	"On the Line"	34:50	1 March 2021
The history and legends of the Channel Islands, including the legend of the nightly screams heard on the beach known as Petit Port on the island of Guernsey.
166	"Toxic"	32:47	15 March 2021
Explores cases of poisonings in history, including the accidental cyanide poisoning of Fremont and Annie Jackson in the Hotel Margaret in Brooklyn in 1922.
167	"Deviation"	36:26	29 March 2021
An exploration of stories of the undead, including the story of the Vampire of Croglin Grange, which was recorded by Augustus Hare and allegedly occurred in Cumberland, England, in 1875.
168	"Beyond the Pale"	35:46	12 April 2021
The life of Gerald FitzGerald, 11th Earl of Kildare, as well as the legends associated with him. According to legend, FitzGerald, also known as the "Wizard Earl," did not actually die, but will return to rule as king of Ireland. The legends surrounding FitzGerald are an example of a story featuring a "king asleep in mountain.”
169	"Blood Money"	34:40	26 April 2021
An exploration of the life of John Kincaid, a prominent witchfinder in the Great Scottish witch hunt of 1649-50, who used pricking as one of his primary means for detecting alleged witches.
170	"Into the Wild"	37:36	10 May 2021
An exploration of stories involving the wild man, including an incident that allegedly occurred in the Bitterroot Mountains south of Missoula, Montana, in the 1860s, in which a Bigfoot was reported to have killed a human being.
171	"Long Shadows"	34:40	24 May 2021
The history and ghost stories of St. Augustine, Florida, including the ghost stories associated with the St. Augustine Light.
172	"Under the Influence"	36:02	7 June 2021
An exploration of the life of Edward Arthur Wilson, also known as Brother XII, and his cult known as the Aquarian Foundation, located south of Nanaimo on Vancouver Island, British Columbia. Also describes Brother XII's court hearing in 1928, in which he allegedly incapacitated his opponents through the use of magical powers.
173	"Darkness and Light"	32:03	21 June 2021
An exploration of the history, legends, and folklore surrounding lighthouses, including the Flannan Isles Lighthouse on Eilean Mòr, Scotland, whose keepers disappeared in 1900.
174	"From Scratch"	39:46	5 July 2021
An exploration of the history and legends of Wisconsin, including the legends associated with the city of Whitewater.
175	"Head Case"	39:05	19 July 2021
An exploration of the use of phrenology throughout history, including the incident involving Haydn's skull, in which Joseph Carl Rosenbaum stole the head from the corpse of composer Joseph Haydn in Vienna, Austria, in 1809.
176	"Rooted"	40:00	2 August 2021
An exploration of stories, myths, and folklore involving supernatural beings that live in forests, including an incident that allegedly occurred in the Beverly Commons (also known as the Witch Woods) near Beverly, Massachusetts, in 1841.
177	"Strings"	40:37	16 August 2021
An exploration of stories, legends, and folklore that involve a relationship between music and Satan, including the story of the life of Niccolò Paganini, a musician from Genoa, Italy, who was rumored to have made a deal with the Devil in exchange for his musical talents.
178	"Opportunity"	39:10	30 August 2021
An exploration of the history and legends of Alaska, including the legend of the PS Eliza Anderson and its supposedly miraculous landing on the coast of Kodiak Island in 1897.
179	"Confidence"	34:51	13 September 2021
The life and crimes of Joseph Brown, a confidence trickster who was executed by hanging in York, England, in 1809.
180	"Above the Law"	39:05	27 September 2021
An exploration of stories and historical accounts involving heroic outlaws, including the story of the life of Jack Sheppard of London.
181	"Unsettled"	35:50	4 October 2021
A retelling of an incident that allegedly occurred in 1662 in Driffield, England, in which Isabel Binnington claimed that the ghost of Robert Eliot appeared to her in her boarding house to describe how he had been murdered and buried there 14 years earlier.
182	"Ever-Present"	34:41	11 October 2021
The history and legends of Nevada, including the lynching of Adam Uber in the town of Genoa in 1897, and the curse that Uber allegedly uttered to his lynch mob.
183	"Suffer the Children"	31:50	18 October 2021
An exploration of the circumstances surrounding witch trials in Sweden, including the Torsåker witch trials, in which 71 people were decapitated and burned in Torsåker Parish, Diocese of Härnösand, in 1675. Mahnke describes this witch trial as "the largest mass execution in Sweden’s history, and the largest execution on a single day for any recorded witch trial.”
184	"Falling to Pieces"	29:36	25 October 2021
An exploration of historical incidents in which humans have collected other humans’ body parts, including for human trophy collecting, relics, or for other purposes. One such instance described in the episode occurred in Drumcliff, Ireland, on Beltane in 1858, in which an unknown suspect exhumed the body of Ralph Westropp Brereton and removed his adipose tissue.
185	"Under the Skin"	27:51	8 November 2021
The story of the alleged Satanic possession of Clara Germana Cele, and the exorcism that was performed to expel Satan from her body in KwaZulu-Natal, South Africa, in 1906.
186	"Invisible Boundaries"	27:03	22 November 2021
The story of the citizens of Eyam, England, who quarantined their community during the Great Plague of London in 1666, under the leadership of William Mompesson.
187	"The Crucible"	29:06	6 December 2021
The story of the life of Leonarda Cianciulli, a serial killer who murdered three women in Correggio, Emilia-Romagna, Italy, between 1939 and 1941. Cianciulli claimed that she was a witch, and that she disposed of her victims’ bodies by making them into soap and teacakes.
188	"Hide and Seek"	27:28	20 December 2021
The history of Christmas and its associated traditions and legends, including the Legend of the Mistletoe Bough, which allegedly occurred in Bramshill House in England on Christmas Day in the early 1600s.
189	"Fragments"	29:06	3 January 2022
A summary of alleged encounters with the Yeti, including the footprints that were discovered by Eric Shipton and Edmund Hillary during the 1951 British Mount Everest reconnaissance expedition.
190	"All That Glitters"	28:11	17 January 2022
The history, legends, and ghost stories of Hollywood, Los Angeles, California, including the story of the ghost of the Black Dahlia in the Millennium Biltmore Hotel.
191	"Throwing Voices"	28:16	31 January 2022
The story of the life of John Darrell, a puritan and self-proclaimed exorcist from Mansfield, England, who was prosecuted and imprisoned for fraud in 1598.
192	"Time Will Tell"	28:11	14 February 2022
An exploration of stories and legends involving time travel, including the legend of Rudolph Fentz in New York City in 1950.
193	"Eye to Eye"	31:05	28 February 2022
A summary of legends and alleged encounters with the rougarou, including the legend of Jean Plante's alleged encounter in Argentenay, France, in the 1600s.
194	"Lawless"	28:25	14 March 2022
The history, legends, and ghost stories of Nevada City, Montana, including the story of the ghost of George Ives, a member of the Innocents who was hanged in 1863.
195	"Straight to the Heart"	29:06	28 March 2022
The story of the Ratcliff Highway murders, which occurred on The Highway in London in 1811.
196	"Bad Seed"	31:50	11 April 2022
Stories involving weather lore from various cultures, including an incident in which a priest was buried alive in Crimea in 1905.
197	"Taken"	28:30	25 April 2022
A selection of stories, legends, and accounts involving fairies, including a story in which a schoolmaster named Dr. Moore was allegedly taken by fairies in County Wicklow, Ireland, in 1678.
198	"Curtain Call"	28:12	9 May 2022
A selection of legends and superstitions associated with the theatre, including the story of the ghost of William Terriss, an actor who was murdered by Richard Archer Prince outside the Adelphi Theatre in London in 1897.
199	"Cutting Ties"	31:05	23 May 2022
The story of the life of Lizzie Borden, a suspect in the axe murders that took place in Fall River, Massachusetts, in 1892.
200	"Up Close"	30:50	6 June 2022
A selection of Mahnke's personal experiences with alleged paranormal phenomena, including an alleged encounter with a ghost in the Paramount Theatre in Austin, Texas.
201	"Inescapable"	31:51	20 June 2022
A selection of European ghost stories from the 1600s to the 1800s, including an alleged experience reported by Huguenot minister François Perrault in Mâcon, France, in 1612.
202	"Surface Tension"	27:19	4 July 2022
The history, legends, and ghost stories of Lake Lanier in northeast Georgia, including the ghost story of the "Lady of the Lake.”
203	"Blurry Pictures"	29:30	18 July 2022
An exploration of alleged prophets and seers throughout history and folklore, including the story of the Brahan Seer, who was allegedly executed by boiling on Chanonry Point in Scotland.
204	"Alluring"	30:50	1 August 2022
An exploration of myths and legends involving atmospheric ghost lights, including an account reported by W. T. Stead in the churchyard of Knotty Ash, Liverpool, England.
205	"Bit by Bit"	31:10	15 August 2022
An exploration of stories from history, folklore, and mythology involving horses, including a selection of alleged encounters with the death coach in Sandford-on-Thames, England, as well as in County Clare, Ireland. The coach in the former story allegedly transports the ghost of Anne Boleyn to her home in Blickling Hall every year on the anniversary of her execution.
206	"Fault Lines"	30:28	29 August 2022
The history and legends of San Francisco, California, including the history and legends of Alcatraz Island.
207	"Flesh & Blood"	29:35	12 September 2022
The story of the disappearance of Bobby Dunbar. Four-year-old Dunbar disappeared from Opelousas, Louisiana, in 1912.
208	"Bygone"	31:44	26 September 2022
A summary of alleged psychics who claimed to be able to locate lost objects, animals, and people, including Luvia Lafirira of Plainfield, Vermont.
209	"Thick & Thin"	27:25	3 October 2022
A summary of various means of transport supposedly used by witches in folklore, including an alleged case in which a group of witches teleported from Bakewell, England, to London in the early 1600s.
210	"Breaking Down"	31:57	10 October 2022
The history and ghost stories of the Ohio State Reformatory in Mansfield, Ohio.
211	"Charmed"	28:52	17 October 2022
A summary of various talismans and amulets used to protect people from harm. One such object is the Bible carried by an American soldier named Donald during World War II.
212	"Unforeseen"	29:03	24 October 2022
The history of the Philadelphia poison ring, whose leaders were sentenced to the electric chair in 1941.
213	"Dark Tails"	28:02	31 October 2022
An exploration of cats in history and folklore, including the story of Agnes Bowker of Leicestershire, England, in 1569.
214	"Spoiled"	28:48	7 November 2022
The history, legends, and ghost stories of the National Park Service, including Grand Canyon National Park in Arizona.
215	"Mind over Matter"	29:12	21 November 2022
An exploration of a selection of alleged celebrity mediums, including Henry Slade, a self-proclaimed automatic writer who was exposed as a fraud in London in 1876.
216	"Tales of Wonder"	30:24	5 December 2022
A selection of animals throughout history that were alleged to possess psychic powers, including an allegedly psychic horse from Virginia known as Lady Wonder.
217	"Deadly Currents"	28:57	19 December 2022
A selection of alleged cryptid sightings along the Monongahela River, including an encounter with the Ogua in Rivesville, West Virginia, in 1983.
218	"Notorious"	27:53	2 January 2023
A summary of locations throughout the United States that are associated with legends referring to Satan, including the Stull Cemetery in Stull, Kansas, which is rumored to be one of the alleged gates of hell.
219	"Unanswered"	26:50	16 January 2023
A summary of the circumstances surrounding the unsolved murders of cult leader Benny Evangelist and his family in Detroit, Michigan, in 1929. Also discusses several of the leading theories on the identities and motives of the perpetrator(s).
220	"Uplifting"	30:38	30 January 2023
A summary of alleged sightings of mystery airships, including an alleged account in Broadway, Ohio, in 1911, in which a woman named Idella claimed to have been attacked by unknown beings from up in the sky.
221	"Remote Control"	26:16	13 February 2023
An exploration of the use of love potions throughout history, including the story of Mary Blandy of Oxfordshire, England, who accidentally poisoned her father with a love potion made of arsenic in 1751.
222	"Outsider"	24:59	27 February 2023
A summary of alleged encounters with Bigfoot-like cryptids throughout the Midwestern United States in the 1970s, including the encounter with the Minerva Monster in Minerva, Ohio, in 1978.
223	"Worlds Collide"	30:03	13 March 2023
An exploration of European witch-hunts, including the witch trials in Iceland.
224	"Seriously Ill"	30:12	27 March 2023
An exploration of the history and folklore surrounding rabies, including the use of an alleged madstone to cure the disease in Terre Haute, Indiana.
225	"Dark Animation"	29:41	10 April 2023
An exploration of the folklore of Iceland, including descriptions and stories of the draugr.
226	"Grounded"	30:19	24 April 2023
An exploration of the folklore and legends behind petrosomatoglyphs throughout the world, including the Devil's Footprint in Ipswich, Massachusetts, which according to legend was created by Satan while wrestling with George Whitefield in 1740.
227	"Bloodlines"	25:27	8 May 2023
An exploration of the origins of various fairy tales, including the story of the life of Gilles de Rais, who may have been an inspiration for the story of Bluebeard.
228	"Safe House"	30:40	22 May 2023
The history of the use of sanctuaries throughout history, as well as a selection of stories and legends involving the use of a sanctuary, including the legend of the Princes in the Tower.
229	"Dark Shapes"	25:58	5 June 2023
A selection of stories and legends of lake monsters throughout the United States, including the Flathead Lake Monster in Montana.
230	"Gilded"	32:10	19 June 2023
The history and legends of Denver, Colorado, including the history and ghost stories of Cheesman Park.
231	"Out of Breath"	28:46	3 July 2023
An exploration of the Mad Gasser of Mattoon, who allegedly attacked a selection of households in Mattoon, Illinois, in 1944.
232	"Empowered"	31:04	17 July 2023
The life of Zora Neale Hurston and her exploration of hoodoo, including the stories of a hoodoo practitioner in Orange County, Florida, known as Old Man Massey.
233	"Down to Earth"	26:55	31 July 2023
An exploration of the Flatwoods monster, which was allegedly encountered in Flatwoods, West Virginia, in 1952.
234	"Sunk"	28:21	14 August 2023
The history and legends of the Bermuda Triangle, including the disappearances of USS Cyclops in 1918 and Flight 19 in 1945.
