= Lore (TV series) =

American horror anthology television series

- The scariest stories are true
- Genre: Horror; Mystery; Drama; Documentary
- Based on: Lore
- Developed by: Aaron Mahnke; Gale Anne Hurd; Ben Silverman; Howard Owens
- Written by: Glen Morgan; Tyler Hisel; David Chiu; Patrick Wall; Marilyn Osborn; Jeff Eckerle; David Coggeshall; Carlos Foglia; Ashley Halloran; Jose Molina; Sean Crouch; Ashley E. Miller; Alyssa Clark
- Narrated by: Aaron Mahnke (Season 1)
- Composer: Chad Lawson
- Country of origin: United States
- Original language: English
- No. of seasons: 2
- No. of episodes: 12

Production
- Executive producers: Gale Anne Hurd; Brett-Patrick Jenkins; Aaron Mahnke; Howard T. Owens; Ben Silverman
- Producers: Howard Young; Phillip Kobylanski
- Production location: Atlanta, Georgia
- Cinematography: Stephen Campbell
- Editors: Christopher Kronus; James Coblentz; Devon Greene; Eleanor Infante
- Running time: 31–58 minutes
- Production companies: Amazon Studios; Valhalla Entertainment; Propagate Content

Original release
- Network: Amazon Prime Video
- Release: October 13, 2017 – October 19, 2018

Lore is an American horror anthology television documentary series developed by the creator of the podcast of the same name, Aaron Mahnke, with Valhalla Entertainment and Propagate Content. The series airs through Amazon Prime Video and follows the podcast's anthology format with each episode featuring a new story. The show combines documentary footage and cinematic scenes to tell horror stories and their origins, and features Robert Patrick, Holland Roden, Colm Feore, Adam Goldberg, Doug Bradley, Maimie McCoy, Jürgen Prochnow, Steven Berkoff, Paula Malcomson, and Josh Bowman. The series premiered on October 13, 2017.

On February 26, 2018, Amazon renewed the series for a second season. The second season premiered on October 19, 2018. On July 27, 2019, the series was cancelled.

== Cast and characters ==
- Aaron Mahnke as Narrator
- Campbell Scott as George Brown
- Colm Feore as Dr. Walter Freeman
- Kristen Cloke as Dr. Marjorie Freeman
- Holland Roden as Bridget Cleary
- Cathal Pendred as Michael Cleary
- John Byner as Patrick Boland
- Robert Patrick as Reverend Eliakim Phelps
- Bethany Anne Lind as Sarah Nicholson Phelps
- Daniel Thomas May as Austin Phelps
- Adam Goldberg as Peter Stumpp
- Kristin Bauer van Straten as Minnie Otto
- Sandra Ellis Lafferty as Aunt Bridget
- Emmett J. Scanlan as William Burke
- Emmet Byrne as William Hare
- Nadine Lewington as Johanna Kennedy Burke
- Doug Bradley as Dr. Robert Knox
- Maimie McCoy as Elizabeth Báthory
- Rosalind Eleazar as Ava
- Ella Hunt as Lady Margit
- Jürgen Prochnow as Andreas Gruber
- Susanne Wuest as Viktoria Gabriel
- Thomas Kretschmann as Inspector Georg Reingruber
- Vladimir Burlakov as Officer Johann Anneser
- Numan Acar as Dirvick Mirandesh
- Steven Berkoff as Dr. Kristoff Brehovy
- Paula Malcomson as Mary Webster
- Paul Rhys as Phillip Smith
- Josh Bowman as Jack Parsons
- Alicia Witt as Marjorie Cameron
- Ryan Sampson as Edward Forman
- Ian Gelder as Aleister Crowley

== Broadcast ==
Lore debuted on Amazon Prime Video on October 13, 2017.

=== Reception ===
Initial critical reception was mixed. As of August 15, 2019, Season 1 had earned an aggregate rating of 68% "fresh" on Rotten Tomatoes, based on 25 critic ratings. Dread Central praised the series awarding it five out of five stars and saying "The only negative I can find is that there aren't more episodes. It's just that good." IGN gave it 9.0 and said "It is a wonderful piece of entertainment for horror fans and casual viewers alike to learn more about the monsters we thought we knew so well." Nerdist gave it 4 out of 5 burned heart burritos.

== Episodes ==
Season	Episodes	Originally released
1	6	October 13, 2017
2	6	October 19, 2018

=== Season 1 (2017) ===
No. overall	No. in season	Title	Directed by	Written by	Original release date
1	1	"They Made a Tonic"	Darnell Martin	Jeff Eckerle, Marilyn Osborn	October 13, 2017
Before we knew how disease spread, medicine was as much superstition as it was science. And in the small New England towns of the 1800s, there is a belief that consumption can only be stopped by making sure the dead are actually dead. This episode speculates that America invented the word Vampire and that Mercy Brown was the inspiration for Bram Stoker's Dracula.
2	2	"Echoes"	Thomas J. Wright	Glen Morgan	October 13, 2017
Dr. Walter Freeman is the father of the ice pick lobotomy. He believes the ten-minute procedure will all but end the need for the mental hospital. He has the best of intentions but winds up creating an entirely new kind of horror story.
3	3	"Black Stockings"	Thomas J. Wright	David Chiu, Patrick Wall	October 13, 2017
In 19th century Ireland, folklore has a strong hold. Michael Cleary is convinced his wife, Bridget, has been replaced by a fairy called a changeling. And his belief drives him to the most extreme act.
4	4	"Passing Notes"	Nick Copus	Glen Morgan	October 13, 2017
In 19th century America, at the height of the Spiritualist Movement, a haunted house is not just the stuff of ghost stories. Many believe the dead can talk and, sometimes, will come back from the other side to wreak havoc on the living.
5	5	"The Beast Within"	Darnell Martin	David Coggeshall	October 13, 2017
Werewolves are now movie monsters. But they were once thought to be all too real. In 1589, villagers in Bedburg, Germany, are convinced that a werewolf is killing women and children only to discover the killer is really one of their own.
6	6	"Unboxed"	Michael E. Satrazemis	Tyler Hisel	October 13, 2017
Robert Gene Otto is a child without friends. That is, until he receives a doll as a gift. He names the doll after himself, Robert. They become fast friends and soon the boy believes the doll is real. But to everyone else... Robert the Doll is a curse.

=== Season 2 (2018) ===
No. overall	No. in season	Title	Directed by	Written by	Original release date
7	1	"Burke and Hare: In the Name of Science"	Christoph Schrewe	Carlos Foglia	October 19, 2018
The story of William Burke and William Hare, two Irish immigrants who became very well known for being grave robbers, but later went on to become a famous serial killing duo.
8	2	"Elizabeth Bathory: Mirror, Mirror"	Alice Troughton	Ashley Halloran	October 19, 2018
Elizabeth Bathory became famous as the Countess of Blood, killing young girls via draining their youth to keep herself young. When she runs out of girls, she befriends a noble, keeping her true intentions a secret.
9	3	"Hinterkaifeck: Ghosts in the Attic"	Christoph Schrewe	Jose Molina	October 19, 2018
The Gruber family has suspicions that a ghost is living in the walls and attic of their quiet German farm house. The ensuing investigation delves into the family's strange and puzzling murder and the culprit, who is still unknown today.
10	4	"Prague Clock: The Curse of the Orloj"	Christoph Schrewe	Ashley Edward Miller	October 19, 2018
The Black Plague was believed to be a curse set upon the city of Prague and two clockmaker brothers must race against the large clock in the city square to break the curse before it's too late.
11	5	"Mary Webster: The Witch of Hadley"	Alice Troughton	Alyssa Clark	October 19, 2018
Just a decade before the Salem trials, Mary Webster's small, but very religious town turns against her and accuses her of being a witch. She must rely on herself to prove them wrong.
12	6	"Jack Parsons: The Devil and the Divine"	Alice Troughton	Sean Crouch	October 19, 2018
Jack Parsons was well known for his belief that rockets could one day be sent to outer space. He also believed that one could summon a demon and manages to successfully summon the Scarlet Woman, whom Parsons eventually becomes obsessed with, ignoring his current love, Marjorie Cameron.

== See also ==
- List of podcast adaptations
