= 13 Days of Halloween =

Horror podcasts

13 Days of Halloween is a horror podcast created by Aaron Mahnke and starring Keegan-Michael Key. The show is produced by Blumhouse, iHeartRadio, and Grim & Mild.

== Background ==
The show debuted on October 19, 2020, and released episodes daily until Halloween. The show is an anthology horror podcast. Each episode is about 15 minutes long. Each year a new season is released daily leading up to Halloween. The show is a collaboration between Blumhouse, iHeartRadio, and Grim & Mild. The show uses binaural audio. The show is executive produced by Aaron Mahnke and stars Keegan-Michael Key. The show is set in Hawthorne Manor where the caretaker is played by Key. In each episode, the story of one of the hotel's residents is told.

== See also ==
- Lore
- Quiet Part Loud
