= Dana Schwartz =

American journalist and author

Dana Jae Schwartz
- Born: January 7, 1993 (age 33)
- Education: Brown University
- Occupations: Journalist; author; screenwriter
- Years active: 2014–present
- Spouse: Ian Karmel (m. 2022)
- Children: 1
- Website: dana-schwartz.com

Dana Jae Schwartz (born January 7, 1993) is an American screenwriter and author. She also writes and hosts Noble Blood, a historical weekly podcast for iHeartMedia about the dark side of monarchy.

== Early life ==
Schwartz grew up in Highland Park, Illinois, and was raised in a Jewish household. Schwartz attended Brown University on a public policy and a pre-medical course, but ultimately decided to become a writer. Schwartz was a Presidential Scholar.

== Career ==
After internships with Conan O'Brien and at The Late Show with Stephen Colbert, she began a career as a writer.

While an undergraduate, Schwartz attracted attention by setting up two parodic Twitter profiles, @GuyInYourMFA parodying pretentious and patronizing aspiring writers, and @DystopianYA parodying young adult fiction such as the Hunger Games series set in a dystopian future, both of which became popular with readers. Schwartz's success on Twitter helped launch her career in writing and publishing. She was named one of the hundred most influential people in Brooklyn culture by Brooklyn Magazine in 2016.

While a writer at The New York Observer, Schwartz wrote an open letter to her employer Jared Kushner criticizing his father-in-law Donald Trump's posting content from anti-Semitic sources on his Twitter feed, to which Kushner wrote a similar open letter in response.

Schwartz is the creator and host of the podcast Noble Blood, which focuses on stories from the lives of historical royals. The podcast debuted at No.1 on the iTunes podcast charts. The series was produced by Lore creator Aaron Mahnke.

Schwartz appeared on the September 29, 2020 episode of The George Lucas Talk Show with fellow guest Bill Corbett.

=== Screenwriting ===
Schwartz was a staff writer on the Marvel television series She-Hulk: Attorney at Law for Disney+. In 2021, she co-wrote Bring It On: Cheer or Die with Rebekah McKendry, the seventh Bring It On movie which aired in 2022.

=== Books ===
- And We're Off (2017) Razorbill.
- Choose Your Own Disaster (2018)
- The White Man's Guide to White Male Writers of the Western Canon
- Anatomy: A Love Story
- Immortality: A Love Story
- The Arcane Arts (co-written, as S.D. Coverly)

== Personal life ==
Schwartz is based in Los Angeles. On September 4, 2022, she married American comedian Ian Karmel.
