= Charmer (folklore) =

Charmers were English practitioners of a specific kind of folk magic, specialising in supernatural healing. Other folk magic traditions include those of the cunning folk, the toad doctors and the girdle-measurers.

The charming tradition is quite distinct from others, being based either on the charmer's possession of inherent healing ability by 'laying on of hands', or ownership of an object that had healing properties or possession of a charm or charms in verse, typically deriving from Biblical sources genuine or apocryphal. The latter is the most common source of healing power among charmers.

Charmers differ from cunning folk in two principal ways. They usually refused to charge a fee for their services (even refusing verbal thanks) though they did accept gifts in kind. They also did not attempt to heal those who believed themselves to be suffering from the effects of witchcraft or demonic possession. They restricted themselves to healing natural ailments, such as snakebite, toothache or burns. They would occasionally augment their charming with herbalism.

"There was no ambiguity about what charmers did. They were merely custodians of a God-given gift, not masters of equivocal magical forces. Consequently, people did not prosecute charmers as they did cunning-folk: there was little to accuse them of, as they imposed no charges and they did not provide faulty diagnoses since they did not diagnose."
