= Anthony Anderson (theologian) =

English theological writer & preacher (??–1593)

Anthony Anderson (died 10 October 1593) was an English theological writer and preacher.

== Biography ==
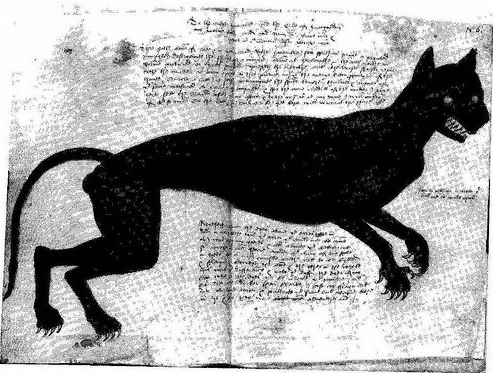
Agnes Bowker's cat - The original picture was sent by Anthony Anderson and the cat was red

Anderson was native of Lancashire and from 1560 to 1569 he worked for the Archdeacon of Leicester. One of the cases he was involved with is still noted. In 1569 Agnes Bowker allegedly gave birth to a cat in Leicestershire. A report was made to the church authorities and Anderson created a life-size drawing of a cat which he annotated and sent it to Henry Hastings, 3rd Earl of Huntingdon. Anderson's drawing went to London and in time the Bishop of London. The case was eventually abandoned and the picture of the cat is now in the British Library.

He was for many years rector of Medbourne, in Leicestershire. According to the parish register he was presented to the benefice in 1573, and held it until 1593, the date of his death. Early in 1587 Anderson was appointed to the vicarage of Stepney near London, and to the rectory of Dengie in Essex, both of which he appears to have held in conjunction with his living in Leicestershire.

In July 1592 he was promoted to the office of subdean of the Chapel Royal, after having held for some years previously the post of ‘gospeller’ there; and his name is found appended to many documents, relating to the management of the Chapel Royal, still preserved among its archives. Anderson died on 10 October 1593.

== Works ==
His published works, which are of a puritanic character, consist of sermons, prayers, and expositions of scriptural passages. From the fact that he dedicated one of his publications to ‘Edmund Anderson, Esq., sergeant-at-law to the queen’, it is possible that he was related to the lord chief justice of that name. The following is a list of his writings :

- ‘An Exposition of the Hymne commonly called Benedictus, with an ample and comfortable application of the same to our age and people, by Anthony Anderson, preacher.’ A dedication to the Bishop of Lincoln is dated from Medbourne, 15 January 1573–4.
- ‘A Godlie Sermon, preached on New Yeares Day last before Sir William Fitzwilliam, Knt., late Deputie of Ireland, at Burghley. Hereto is added a very profitable Forme of Prayer, good for all such as passe the Seas,’ London, 1576, 8vo.
- ‘A Sermon of Sure Comfort preached at the Funerall off Master Robert Keylwey, Esq., at Exton, in Rutland, the 18th of March 1580–1,’ London, 1581, 12mo.
- ‘A Sermon preached at Pauls Crosse, the 23rd of Aprile, being the Lords Day, called Sunday,’ London, 1581. This sermon is again dedicated to Sergeant Anderson.
- ‘The Shield of oure Safetie, set foorth by the Faythfull Preacher of Gods holye Worde, Anthony Anderson, upon Symeons sight in hys Nunc Dimittis,’ 1581. It is dedicated to the Bishop of London.
- ‘Godlye Prayers made by Anthonie Anderson.’ License to print this work, under the hand of the Bishop of London, was granted to John Wolfe 3 August 1591.
