= Aaron Mahnke =

American podcaster

Aaron Mahnke is an American author, podcaster, and television host, with his most well-known works being the Lore podcast and the Lore television show. From Illinois, he worked as a freelance graphic designer and writer after obtaining a psychology degree before starting a career in podcasting. Publishing several thriller books in the early 2010s and having Lore related written material as additional rewards for his followers, the podcast version was his first major creation in 2015 that allowed Mahnke to showcase his psychological background and influences from shows like Unsolved Mysteries.

The success of Lore resulted in an Amazon Prime Video adaptation into a television series and allowed the signing of a collaboration with iHeartMedia for additional podcasts. Acting as host for several new series, writer for others, and producer for a much larger number of podcasts hosted by others, such as Dana Schwartz's Noble Blood and Toby Ball's Strange Arrivals, Mahnke eventually moved into creating fictional podcast shows as well. These have included Bridgewater with Lauren Shippen and Consumed and Havoc Town with Carlos Foglia and Nicholas Tecosky, respectively.

== Education ==
Born in Illinois, Mahnke completed a Bachelor of Psychology degree in university.

== Career ==
After graduation, Mahnke worked as a freelance writer and graphic designer while also self-publishing three thriller novels. He also produced a podcast with Dave Caolo called Home Work that was a "typical two white dudes talking" style.

=== Creation of Lore ===
Begun in March 2015, the Lore podcast was started to cover stories of local mythology and folklore, including their impact on historical communities and the impact that mass psychology can have on society. The podcast had reached the top 20 most listened to publications on iTunes by October 2015, with Mahnke noting that each episode released twice a month took around 30 hours to write and produce. For inspiration behind the development of the podcast, Mahnke has cited The X-Files and Unsolved Mysteries, with a potential purposeful nod to the cheesiness of the productions. Robert Lloyd in the Los Angeles Times positively described Mahnke's style as "confidential yet dry and neutral in that School of Ira Glass way".

The originations of the Lore series came about as a series of PDF files given to readers of his earlier thriller novels, adding in historical notes to the pieces of folklore utilized in his fiction. These files eventually became large enough that they weren't as convenient or useful to read, leading to Mahnke to consider stopping the project altogether, before instead choosing to turn them into an audiobook format.

In October 2017, the Lore television show launched on Amazon Prime Video with six episodes of the podcast converted into a visual form, featuring Mahnke as the host telling the story alongside dramatized versions of the described events. That same year, Mahnke began releasing a series of books through Penguin Random House titled The World of Lore. This series contains already released transcripts from past podcast episodes converted into a book format, similar to Mahnke's original version of Lore.

=== Collaborations and fictional podcasts ===
In 2018, beginning his first new podcasting work since Lore, Mahnke entered into an exclusive partnership deal with iHeartMedia to collaborate on making new podcast shows. For his part, Mahnke created the production company Grim & Mild and acted as producer and host for some shows, such as Unobscured and Cabinet of Curiosities, and as an executive producer for the new hosted shows of others, such as Dana Schwartz's Noble Blood and Toby Ball's Strange Arrivals. This exclusivity deal was renewed in 2020 and, along with the revival of additional seasons for existing podcasts, Mahnke signed on for the production of five new shows, including Rabia Chaudry's The Hidden Djinn. It also resulted in the 2020 release of the podcast 13 Days of Halloween, a collaboration between Mahnke, iHeartMedia, and Blumhouse Television that featured Keegan-Michael Key in a primary role as the "caretaker".

After years of his more serious non-fiction podcast, Mahnke wanted to also create one that was fictional in basis, but still able to present folklore material and research. He contacted Lauren Shippen, creator of The Bright Sessions podcast, and they collaborated on a new podcast called Bridgewater that began releasing in 2021. Based around the Bridgewater Triangle, a former covered topic of Lore, it followed the investigation of a series of disappearances in the Massachusetts area and the variety of supernatural folklore that makes up the Triangle's mythology. The three main cast members were made up of a skeptic, a believer, and an unsure character in the middle, which Mahnke said was necessary so all listeners would have a person to represent them in the story.

He also acted as executive producer for the podcast 12 Ghosts written by Nicholas Tecosky, released entirely in December 2022. Mahnke took up the same production role when his 2014 thriller novel Consumed was turned into a podcast in 2024 in a collaboration with iHeartPodcasts and Carlos Foglia as the writer. The third fictional podcast that followed in 2025, Havoc Town, also featured writing by Tecosky and covered a supernatural horror setting and a centuries long vampire and occult problem in a small town in New Hampshire.

Continuing on from his previous written works, Mahnke published an eponymous book in 2024 based around the scripts for his Cabinet of Curiosities podcast. The title of the book was inspired by the shelves of "oddities" in the Enlightenment Room at the British Museum. This followed with an original written work in 2026 titled Exhumed that discussed the history and folklore of the New England vampire panic in the 1890s and how the public understanding of the vampire at the time developed from prior decades to result in the Mercy Brown vampire incident.

== Awards ==
The Lore podcast was given the "Best in 2015" award by iTunes and was named one of the "Best Podcasts of 2016" by Entertainment Weekly. In 2024, Mahnke was inducted into the Podcast Hall of Fame.

== Personal life ==
Mahnke lives in Danvers, Massachusetts.

== Bibliography ==
- — (2011). Destiny - A Fairy Tale. Aaron Mahnke. p. 254. ISBN 9781463724962.
- — (2012). Frictionless Freelancing. Aaron Mahnke. p. 176. ISBN 9781480158986.
- — (2014). Indian Summer. Aaron Mahnke. p. 256. ISBN 9781495370014.
- — (2014). Consumed. Aaron Mahnke. p. 342. ISBN 9781503287181.
- — (2015). Grave Suspicion. Aaron Mahnke. p. 354. ISBN 9781514822401.
- — (2017). The World of Lore #1: Monstrous Creatures. Wildfire Press. p. 299. ISBN 9781472251664.
- — (2018). The World of Lore #2: Wicked Mortals. Random House. p. 352. ISBN 9781524798000.
- —; Dawson, Delilah S. (2020). Wellington Volume 5. IDW Publishing. p. 120. ISBN 9781684056897.
- — (2024). The World of Lore #3: Dreadful Places. Random House. p. 352. ISBN 9781524798048.
- — (2024). Cabinet of Curiosities: A Historical Tour of the Unbelievable, the Unsettling, and the Bizarre. St. Martin's Press. p. 320. ISBN 9781250291219.
- — (2026). Exhumed: Unearthing the History of the American Vampire. Running Press. p. 368. ISBN 9798894141831.

== Podcasts ==
Year	Title	Host	Writer	Producer	Ref
2025 - 2025	Havoc Town	No	No	Yes	
2024 - 2024	Consumed	No	No	Yes	
2023 - 2024	That's Just Weird	Yes	Yes	Yes	
2022 - 2023	Grim & Mild Presents	Yes	Yes	Yes	
2022 - 2022	12 Ghosts	No	No	Yes	
2021 - 2025	Haunted Road	No	No	Yes	
2021 - 2023	Bridgewater	No	No	Yes	
2020 - 2023	13 Days of Halloween	No	Yes	Yes	
2020 - 2023	Strange Arrivals	No	No	Yes	
2020 - 2023	American Shadows	No	No	Yes	
2020 - 2021	The Hidden Djinn	No	No	Yes	
2019 - Current	Noble Blood	No	No	Yes	
2018 - Current	Cabinet of Curiosities	Yes	Yes	Yes	
2018 - 2021	Unobscured	Yes	Yes	Yes	
2015 - Current	Lore	Yes	Yes	Yes	
