= Baptist Church in Exeter =

Historic church in Rhode Island, United States

- U.S. National Register of Historic Places
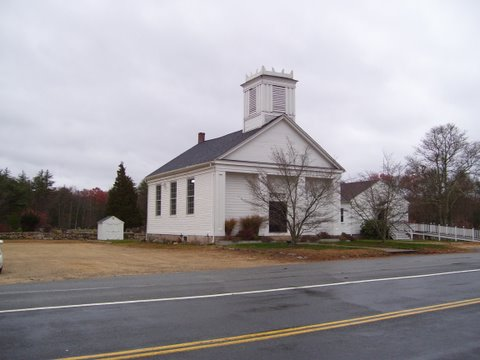
- church with graveyard in background

- Location within Rhode Island Location within the United States
- Location: 467 Ten Rod Road, Exeter, Rhode Island
- Coordinates: 41°34′52″N 71°33′28″W
- Built: 1838
- Architectural style: Greek Revival
- NRHP reference No.: 78000014
- Added to NRHP: November 21, 1978

The Baptist Church in Exeter, also known as Chestnut Hill Baptist Church, is a historic building located in Exeter, Rhode Island.

The church building was constructed in 1838 in a Greek Revival style. The church was added to the National Register of Historic Places on November 21, 1978. Mercy Brown, an alleged vampire, was buried in the Chestnut Hill Baptist Church cemetery in 1892 and later exhumed.

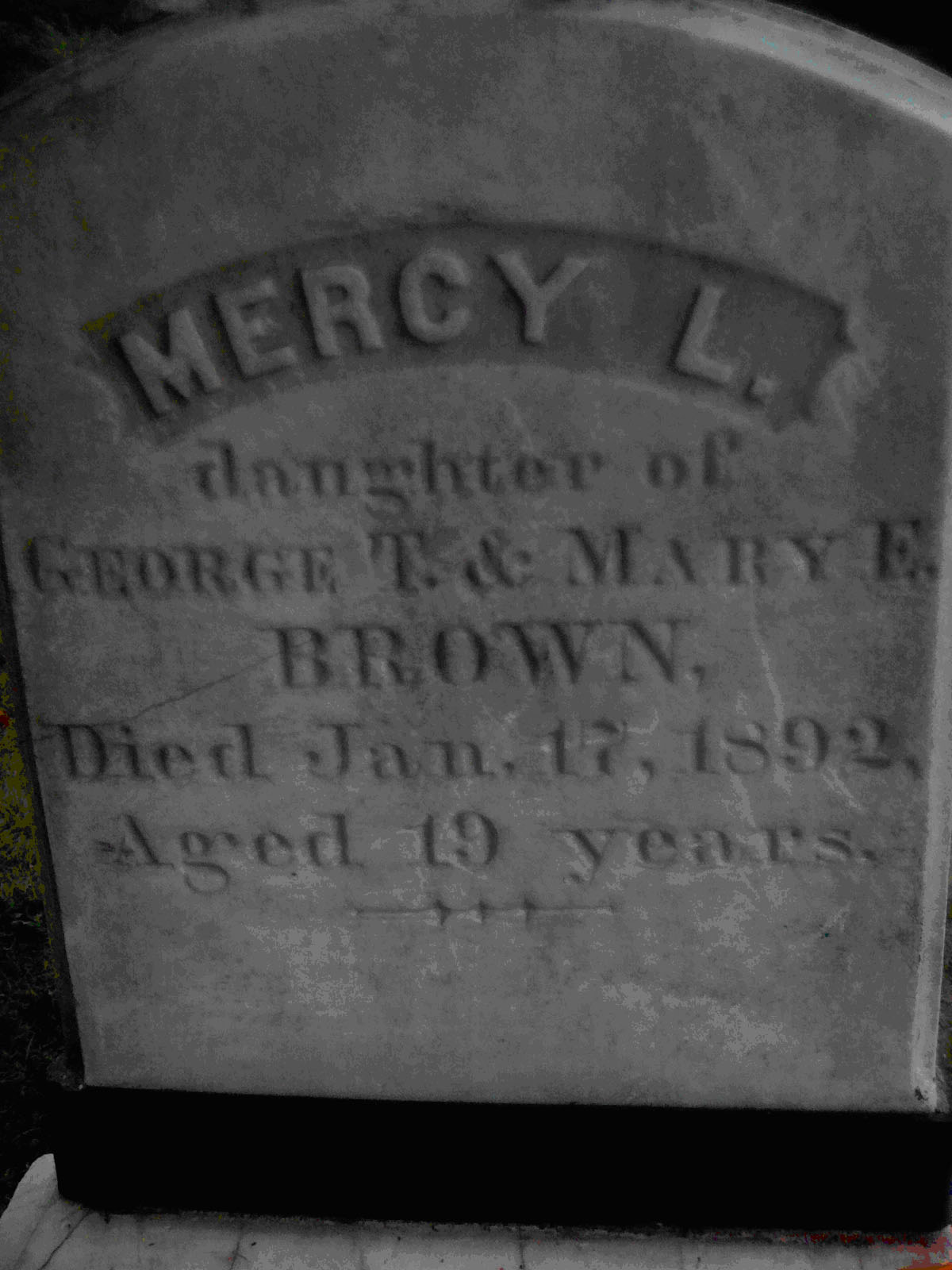
Mercy Brown gravestone in Chestnut Hill Baptist Church Cemetery

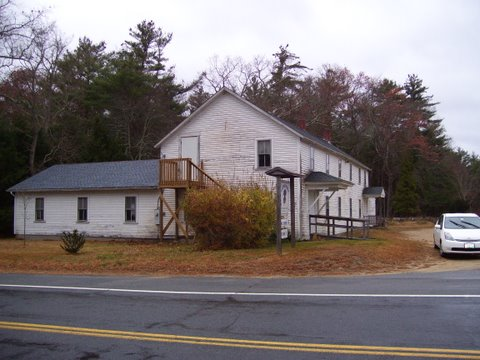
Grange Hall adjacent to the church

== See also ==
- National Register of Historic Places listings in Washington County, Rhode Island
