= Friday Harbor High School =

Coordinates: 48°32′09″N 123°01′17″W

Location
- 45 Blair St; Friday Harbor, Washington 98250

Information
- Type: Public
- Principal: Andrea Hillman
- Staff: 14.74 (FTE)
- Grades: 9-12
- Enrollment: 257 (2023-2024)
- Student to teacher ratio: 17.44
- Colors: Purple & Gold
- Mascot: Wolverines
- Website: fhhs.sjisd.wednet.edu

Friday Harbor High School is a four-year public high school located in Friday Harbor, Washington, USA. It is the only public high school on San Juan Island, and it is a part of the San Juan Island School District.

The boundary of the school district (and therefore of the school district) includes Friday Harbor and Roche Harbor.

== Funding ==
FHHS is a Gates High Tech High School since it received a grant from the Bill and Melinda Gates Foundation through the Connecting Schools and Communities (CSAC) project in Washington State. The grant is to ensure that more students leave high school ready for college, work, and civic contribution.

== Achievement ==
The school's team for the National Ocean Sciences Bowl has had success winning the Washington regional title known as the Orca Bowl in 2004, 2005, 2010, 2011 and 2012.. In 2004 they were second overall in the national competition losing to Mission San Jose High School from Fremont, California. Their WASL (Washington Assessment of Student Learning) testing scores are consistently above the state's average. Students are now required to pass the WASL to graduate. Most students take the WASL in tenth grade, but it is an option to take it as a freshman.
