= Agnes Bowker =

Alleged mother of a cat (born c. 1541)

- Born: 1541 or 1542; Leicestershire
- Occupation: servant

Agnes Bowker (born c. 1541) was an English domestic servant and the alleged mother of a cat.

== Life ==
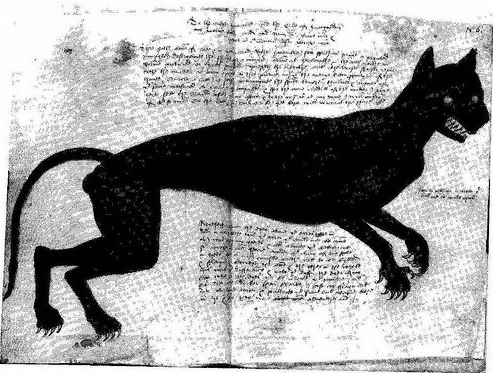
The original picture was sent by Anthony Anderson and the cat was red

Bowker was born in Leicestershire (probably Market Harborough) to a local family in about 1541. She came to prominence when her midwife, Elizabeth Harrison, reported that she had given birth to a cat on 16 January 1569. The story caused interest as it was feared that some may see this as a portent. The idea was not dismissed even after the cat that was said to have been born was found to have food in its stomach. A pamphlet was circulated. Bowker was not married and she had tried drowning and hanging herself during her pregnancy. The rest of her life is unclear but she came from a local family and she worked in the Leicestershire area. She had visited London and seen Elizabeth I in 1566.

The report was made to the church authorities and Anthony Anderson who worked for the Archdeacon of Leicester. He created a life-size drawing of a cat which he annotated and sent to nobleman Henry Hastings, 3rd Earl of Huntingdon. Hastings had local connections but he was also close to the Queen during the Rising of the North. He sent the report to Queen Elizabeth's advisor Sir William Cecil. Cecil sent it on to Edmund Grindal who was then the Bishop of London but who would in time be the Archbishop of Canterbury. Grindal concluded the affair in August of that year when he ruled that it was a hoax, but he conceded that there was no evidence to prove that Bowker was not telling the truth.

== Legacy ==
It is unknown what happened to Agnes Bowker but the picture of the cat is now in the British Library. Bowker's alleged birth of a cat was also dismissed by the London physician William Bullein in 1573.
