= Roche Harbor, Washington =

Unincorporated community in Washington, United States

Roche Harbor
- Unincorporated community and Census designated place
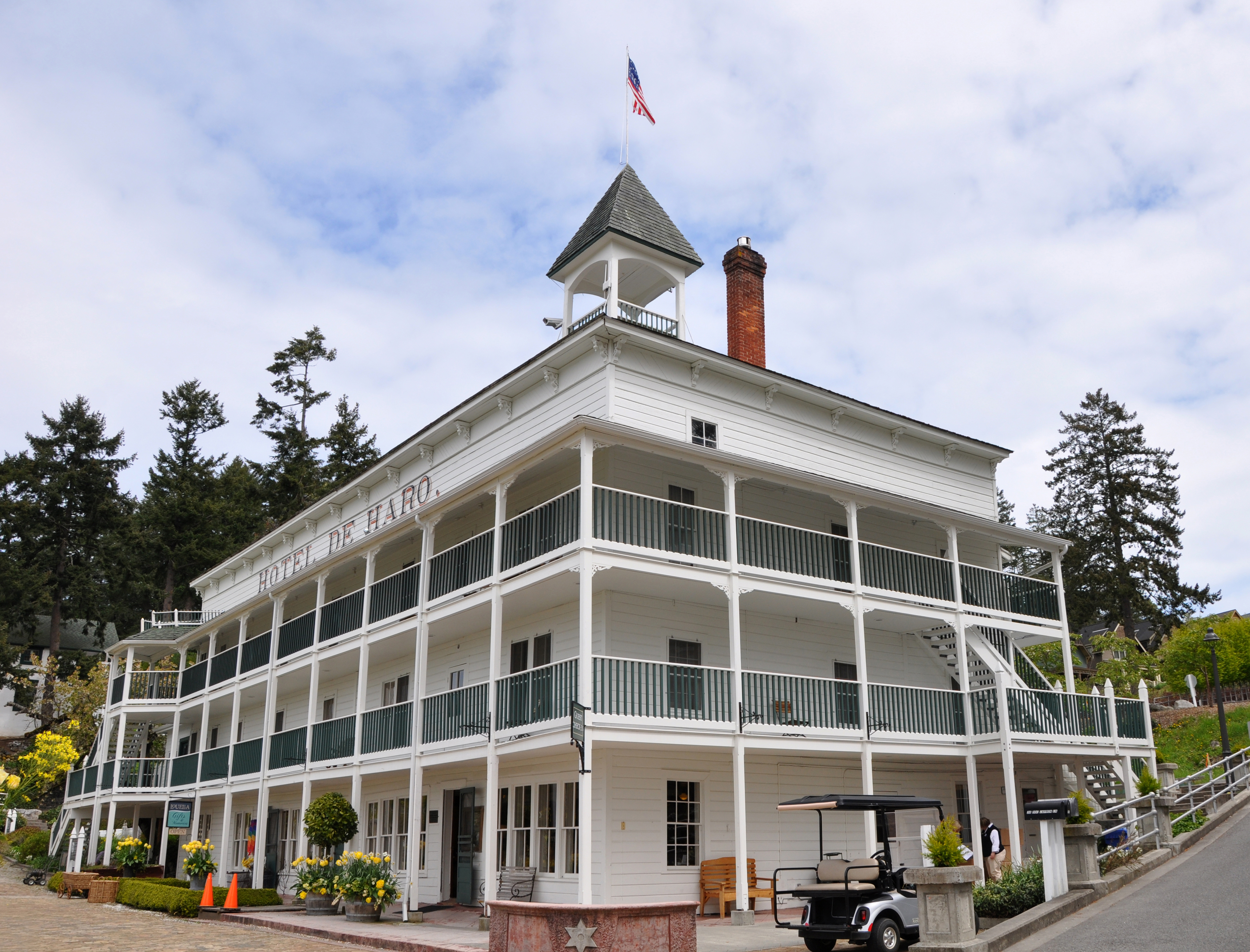
- Hotel de Haro

- Location within the state of Washington Roche Harbor (the United States)
- Coordinates: 48°36′37″N 123°07′40″W
- Country: United States
- State: Washington
- County: San Juan
- Elevation: 131 ft (40 m)

Population (2020)
  - Total: 662
- Time zone: UTC-8 (Pacific (PST))
  - Summer (DST): UTC-7 (PDT)
- ZIP Code: 98250
- Area code(s): 360, 564
- GNIS feature ID: 2807189
- Roche Harbor
- U.S. National Register of Historic Places
- U.S. Historic district
- Location within Washington (state)
- Location: Northern San Juan Island, San Juan Island, Washington
- Area: 140 acres (57 ha)
- Built: 1886
- NRHP reference No.: 77001356
- Added to NRHP: August 29, 1977

Roche Harbor is a sheltered harbor on the northwest side of San Juan Island in San Juan County, Washington, United States, and the site of a resort of the same name. It is listed as a census designated place (CDP). Roche Harbor faces Haro Strait and the Canada–United States border. The harbor itself provides one of the better protected anchorages in the islands. The harbor is surrounded on the east side by San Juan Island, on the north side by Pearl Island, and on the west and south sides by Henry Island. Most of the harbor is 35 to 45 feet (11 to 14 meters) deep. Roche Harbor has a small airport used primarily by local residents.

Roche Harbor is a designated U.S. port of entry. A Customs dock occupies a section of the marina, with Customs and Border Protection agents on duty during summer months. When agents are not on duty, arriving boaters must call Customs and Border Protection from the Customs Dock.

== History ==
=== Pre-contact to mid-1850s ===
What is now Roche Harbor was once part of a thriving Coast Salish community known as whelaalk, or WH’LEHL-kluh, which extended from what is now Roche Harbor to Lonesome Cove opposite Speiden Island and in the mid-1800s had 10 large longhouses.

Other nearby communities included:

- KWUH-nuhs (“whale”), at Reid Harbor on Stuart Island.
- lhuh-LHEE-ng’kwulh, at the head of Open Bay on Henry Island. This was the home of sweh-TUHN, the earliest ancestor of the Lummi, Saanich, Samish and Songhees peoples.
- SMUH-yuh, at what is now Westcott Bay.
- Pe'pi'ow'elh, at what is now called English Camp at San Juan Island National Historical Park. Evidence found at Pe'pi'ow'elh suggests this site had been continuously occupied at least from about 500 AD until 1860 when British Marines demolished a 600–800-foot (180–240 m) longhouse on what became the parade ground of their garrison.

(The San Juan Islands are included in the Treaty of Point Elliott of 1855, which made land available for newcomers. But the area's First Peoples retain certain resource rights throughout their historical territory, including Roche Harbor. In 2004 and 2008, Coast Salish canoes returned to WH’LEHL-kluh — Roche Harbor — as part of the annual Canoe Journey, a gathering of Northwest Native peoples. And in 2016, representatives of the Lummi Nation, Saanich First Nation and National Park Service conducted a ceremony at which a Reef Net Captain Totem Pole and two Salmon Story Boards were dedicated at Pe'pi'ow'elh — English Camp.)

British Marines established a presence here in 1860 after Great Britain and the United States claimed the San Juan Islands and agreed to a joint military occupation until the territory dispute could be resolved. Roche Harbor was named for Lt. Richard Roche, who served under British Capt. Henry Kellett in 1846 and Capt. James Charles Prevost in 1857–60, and scouted the area for an ideal site for the British Royal Marines encampment.

=== Mid-1850s to mid-1950s ===
British Marines quarried and processed limestone at or near Roche Harbor. After the territory dispute was settled in 1872 in favor of the United States, the land encompassing Roche Harbor was homesteaded by Joseph Ruff, 1872–78, and afterward owned by Israel Katz, 1878–79; and brothers Richard and Robert Scurr and their business partners, Alexander, Colin and Donald Ross, 1879-1886. (Katz was a Port Townsend merchant and future mayor of that city who during the joint military occupation established stores in Friday Harbor, Argyle, and San Juan Town, near the U.S. military encampment.) Limestone was quarried at the higher-elevation source, delivered by rail to chutes and dropped into the kilns, and the processed lime removed and bagged or barreled within a short distance from the warehouse and wharf.

Tacoma lawyer John S. McMillin and his business partners in the Tacoma Lime Company — including future U.S. Ambassador to France Hugh Campbell Wallace (1864-1931) — saw the potential for an expanded and efficient limestone operation here, purchased the site from the Scurrs and Rosses, and established the Tacoma and Roche Harbor Lime Company in 1886.

McMillin built the Hotel de Haro, where he and his family lived until 1910 when they built homes nearby, and a community with cottages for employees, a church, general store, post office, school, gardens and farm. The McMillin children — Fred, Paul and Dorothy — were raised here, and their mother, Louella, was postmaster and taught Sunday school for children in the community. John McMillin, an avid boater, founded the Roche Harbor Yacht Club. The company and the McMillins frequently hosted holiday events and gatherings.

A visitor to the company town in 1903 wrote this of Roche Harbor: "A rock-bound coast hems in a wealth of verdant pastures sweet; / Deep forests cover vale and hill where fresh and salt waters meet."

Tacoma and Roche Harbor Lime Company (later to become Roche Harbor Lime & Cement Co.) had kilns, a warehouse, wharf, and a fleet of ships that carried lime to growing markets along the west coast. The company was a major source of lime for use in agriculture and construction throughout the west, including San Francisco after the devastating 1906 earthquake. Roche Harbor's workforce and residents were ethnically diverse, and included people of British, Coast Salish, Irish, Italian, and Japanese ancestry or birth.

John McMillin, a Republican, was politically active. He was a candidate for U.S. Senate, served on the state Railroad Commission (now the Utilities and Transportation Commission), and was a delegate to the Republican National Convention in 1904, 1924, and 1932. During President Theodore Roosevelt's visit to the West in 1903, Roche Harbor was included in a south-north travel itinerary — proposed by boosters in the region — that included Port Townsend, the San Juan Islands, Anacortes and Bellingham. However, Roosevelt's train schedule did not allow him to make the visit. (The Washington leg of his tour: from Salem, Oregon to Tacoma and Chehalis May 22; Everett May 23; Seattle May 23 and 24; Walla Walla, Ellensburg and Yakima May 25; and Spokane May 26 before departing for Idaho.)

=== Mid-1950s to present ===
In 1956, Tacoma and Roche Harbor Lime Company president Paul McMillin, son of John McMillin, sold Roche Harbor — including 4,000 acres (1,600 ha) and 12 miles (19 km) of coastline — to the Reuben J. Tarte family of Bellevue, which developed the town into a boating resort with a marina, a restored Hotel de Haro, an airstrip (on the former site of the farm), and restaurant (in the former McMillin home).

The Tarte family sold Roche Harbor in 1988 to businessmen Verne Howard of King's Market and Rich Komen of Restaurants Unlimited; Roche Harbor is now owned by Komen and Saltchuk Resources.

Members of the McMillin family are interred in a nearby mausoleum known as Afterglow Vista. The Hotel de Haro remains a focal point of the community. A store in the hotel features a mural portrait of Louella McMillin above the words "MoMo," a term of endearment used by her four granddaughters.

Under Komen and Saltchuk's ownership, Roche Harbor has evolved into a year-round community with new neighborhoods of Craftsman-style homes, as well as businesses, activities and amenities that appeal to residents and visitors. The community features several historic structures still in active use, including the hotel, the general store, cottages, McMillin's Dining Room (the former John and Louella McMillin home), and the McMillin Suites (formerly Paul McMillin's home). Several kilns have been preserved. Newer buildings reflect the architectural style of the Craftsman era. A full concrete foundation was placed under the Hotel de Haro in 2013, requiring the 127-year-old building be lifted a half-inch to accommodate the concrete pour.

== Education ==
The community is served by the San Juan Island School District. The district's lone public high school is Friday Harbor High School.

== Demographics ==
Historical population
Census	Pop.	Note	%±
2020	662		—
U.S. Decennial Census

Roche Harbor first appeared as a census designated place in the 2020 U.S. census.

=== Racial and ethnic composition ===
Roche Harbor CDP, Washington – Racial and ethnic composition Note: the US Census treats Hispanic/Latino as an ethnic category. This table excludes Latinos from the racial categories and assigns them to a separate category. Hispanics/Latinos may be of any race.
Race / Ethnicity (NH = Non-Hispanic)	Pop 2020	2020
White alone (NH)	592	89.43%
Black or African American alone (NH)	0	0.00%
Native American or Alaska Native alone (NH)	1	0.15%
Asian alone (NH)	8	1.21%
Native Hawaiian or Pacific Islander alone (NH)	0	0.00%
Other race alone (NH)	0	0.00%
Mixed race or Multiracial (NH)	31	4.68%
Hispanic or Latino (any race)	30	4.53%
Total	662	100.00%

== Notable people ==
- John S. McMillin (1855-1936), president, Tacoma and Roche Harbor Lime Company.
- Hugh Campbell Wallace (1864-1931), officer in Tacoma and Roche Harbor Lime Company.

== Media ==
=== Books ===
Books written about the community or using the town as a backdrop include, "Roche Harbor: A Saga in the San Juans," by Lynette Evans and George Burley. and "Cruise of the Calcite," by John A. McCormick, an illustrated account of a 1908 cruise aboard John S. McMillin's yacht, Calcite, from Roche Harbor to Princess Louisa Inlet. A fictional novel, * "The Roche Harbor Caper," by D.M. Ulmer is set in Roche Harbor. "Roche Harbor," by Richard Walker is an illustrated history book published as part of Arcadia's Images of America series. The book, "The Building of Roche Harbor Resort by the Tarte Family," by Neil Tarte is an account of the Tarte family's development of the former lime company town into a boating resort.

=== Film and television ===
Roche Harbor was featured in "Namu the Killer Whale," a 1966 family drama filmed in the San Juan Islands and starring Robert Lansing and Lee Meriwether and featuring Clara Tarte, co-owner of Roche Harbor Resort.
