= Girdle-measurers =

Girdle-measurers were practitioners of a specific type of curative English folk magic. They claimed to be able to tell whether fairies had placed a person under a spell, or otherwise caused trouble for them. They did this by measuring the changing length of the afflicted person's belt or girdle.
