= Mercy Brown vampire incident =

Event in Rhode Island, US (1892)

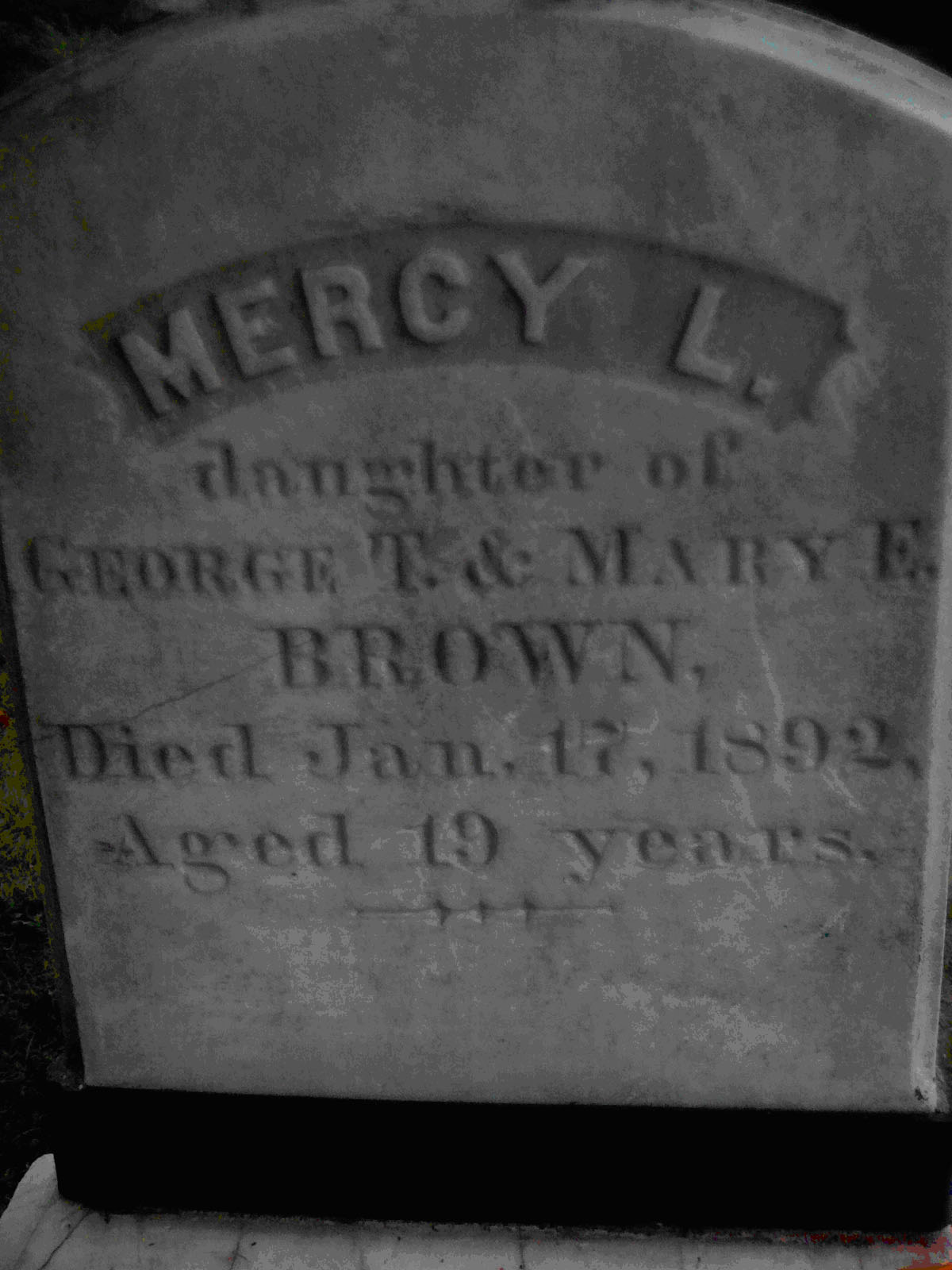
Mercy Brown's gravestone in the cemetery of the Baptist Church in Exeter

The Mercy Brown vampire incident occurred in Rhode Island in January 1892. It is one of the best documented cases of the exhumation of a corpse in order to perform rituals to banish an undead manifestation. The incident was part of the wider New England vampire panic.

Several cases of consumption (tuberculosis) occurred in the family of George Thomas (April 1, 1842 – November 17, 1922) and Mary Eliza "Elizabeth" Arnold Brown (October 11, 1847 – December 8, 1883) in Exeter, Rhode Island. Friends and neighbors believed that this was due to the influence of the undead.

== History ==
In Exeter, Rhode Island, several members of George and Mary Brown's family suffered tuberculosis infections in the final two decades of the 19th century. Tuberculosis was called "consumption" at the time, and was a devastating and much-feared disease.

Mary Eliza was the first to die of the disease on December 8, 1883, followed on June 6, 1884, by her eldest daughter Mary Olive at age 20, according to her grave stone. In 1891, daughter Mercy Lena Brown and only son Edwin "Eddie" Atwood Brown also contracted the disease. Friends and neighbors believed that one of the dead family members was a vampire, although they did not use that name, and had caused Edwin's illness. This was in accordance with threads of contemporary folklore, which linked multiple deaths in one family to undead activity. Consumption was a poorly understood condition at the time and the subject of much superstition.

George Brown was persuaded to give permission to exhume several bodies of his family members. Villagers, the local doctor (Dr. Harold Metcalf), and a newspaper reporter exhumed the bodies on March 17, 1892. The bodies of both Mary Eliza and Mary Olive exhibited the expected level of decomposition, so they were thought not to have been the cause. During examination, Dr. Metcalf reported that Mercy Brown's body was also at a normal level of decomposition, and although blood had dripped out of her heart and liver, the amount was to be expected from a corpse buried for the same length of time.

As superstition dictated, Mercy's heart and liver were burned, and the ashes were mixed with water to create a tonic which was given to Edwin in an effort to resolve his illness and stop the influence of the undead. The young man died two months later. What remained of Mercy's body was buried in the cemetery of the Baptist Church in Exeter.

In the end, George Brown was one of very few never to contract tuberculosis, living until 1922, just long enough to see bacteriologists Albert Calmette and Camille Guérin discover the BCG vaccine which is used to reduce risk of severe tuberculosis.

== In popular culture ==
Scholars have suggested that Bram Stoker knew about the Mercy Brown case through newspaper articles and based the character Lucy Westenra upon her in his novel Dracula. It is also referred to in H. P. Lovecraft's "The Shunned House".

The MonsterQuest episode "Vampires In America" investigated the Mercy Brown case and used it as a reference in the investigation.

The American rock band Clutch have a song titled "Mercy Brown" on their 2022 album, Sunrise on Slaughter Beach.

The Mercy Brown incident is discussed at length in Aaron Mahnke's podcast Lore. The incident was also the focus of Mahnke's book Exhumed.

== General references ==
- Bell, Michael E. (2001). Food for the Dead - On the Trail of New England's Vampires. New York: Carrol & Graf Publishers. 338. ISBN 0786708999.
- Connecticut Public Television (1996). Vampires in New England (TV documentary).
