= Toad doctors =

Traditional medicine practitioners in western England

Toad doctors were practitioners of a specific tradition of medicinal folk magic, operating in western England until the end of the 19th century. Their main concern was healing scrofula (then called "the King's Evil," a skin disease), though they were also believed to cure other ailments including those resulting from witchcraft. They cured the sick by placing a live toad, or the leg of one, in a muslin bag and hanging it around the sick person's neck.
