= Werewolves of Ossory =

Legendary creatures of southeastern Ireland

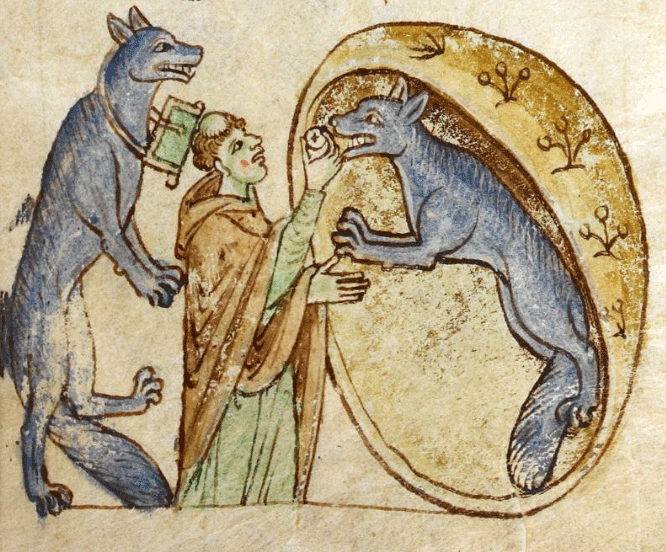
Depiction of the werewolves of Ossory, from Topographia Hibernica by Gerald of Wales, c. 1200

The legendary werewolves of Ossory (Irish: Osraige), a kingdom of early medieval Ireland, are the subject of a number of accounts in medieval Irish, English and Norse works. The werewolves were said to have been the descendants of a legendary figure named Laignech Fáelad whose line gave rise to the kings of Ossory. The legends may have derived from the activities of warriors in ancient Ireland who were the subject of frequent literary comparisons to wolves, and who may have adopted lupine hairstyles or worn wolfskins while they "went wolfing" and carried out raids.

== Background ==
Wolves, though now extinct in Ireland, were once numerous; the Irish were said to be plagued by the animals and bred a special type of dog, the Irish Wolfhound, to hunt them. As late as 1650, the town of Coleraine was said to have been attacked by a pack of hungry wolves. The wolf had a long-standing place in Irish culture, and Irish literature throughout the medieval period associated warriors with wolves. They invoked a combination of ferocity, frenzied behaviour, unpredictable and savage animal behaviour, sexual potency and martial prowess.

In the Irish literary mind, wolves were particularly closely linked with the practices of the fianna, warrior bands of landless young men who lived for much of their time in the wilderness and were thought of as living in close proximity to supernatural forces. Warriors were often depicted with canine attributes and shared a common motif of a wild, disheveled or naked appearance. They were frequently portrayed as wolves, hunting both animals and humans, and may have worn wolfskins or a lupine hairstyle as part of a ritual transformation. The wolf-warriors or luchthonn (literally 'wolf-skins') were said to "go wolfing" when they carried out raids. Such associations may have given rise to Irish legends of werewolves.

== Laignech Fáelad ==
The medieval Irish work Cóir Anmann (Body of Names), which was probably based on earlier traditions, gives an account of a legendary warrior-werewolf named Laignech Fáelad. He was said to be the ancestor of a tribe of werewolves who were related to the kings of Ossory in eastern Ireland, which covered most of present-day County Kilkenny and County Laois prior to the Norman invasion of Ireland in the 12th century. According to Cóir Anmann,

He was a man that used to go wolfing, i.e. into wolf-shapes, i.e. into shapes of wolves he used to go, and his offspring used to go after him and they used to kill the herds after the fashion of wolves, so that it is for that that he used to be called Laignech Fáelad, for he was the first of them who went into a wolf-shape.

He was said in medieval genealogies to be the brother of Feradach mac Duach, the king of Ossory, and the ancestor of its subsequent kings who ruled until being deposed by the Normans. The late 14th-century Book of Ballymote may refer to this tradition in a passage which speaks of "the descendants of the wolf" in Ossory having the power to change themselves and go forth to devour people.

== Other Irish accounts ==
Other accounts of Irish werewolves appear in the 11th-century poem De Mirabilibus Hibernie (On the Marvels of Ireland) by Bishop Patrick of Dublin, the Middle Irish De Ingantaib Érenn (On the Wonders of Ireland) and the 13th-century poem De hominibus qui se vertunt in lupos (Men Who Change Themselves into Wolves). Nennius of Bangor's Historia Brittonum (History of the Britons) presents an Irish version of the latter poem. The accounts describe men who are able to transform themselves into wolves, leaving their human bodies behind. Injuries sustained in lupine form are reflected on their human bodies, while meat from their prey will appear in their mouths. Their human bodies were vulnerable while they were in wolf form, and their friends and family were warned not to move them. Such stories reflected folkloric beliefs that souls could leave the body and travel but could not return if the body was disturbed.

De Ingantaib Érenn speaks of the werewolves as living in Ossory, but this detail is omitted in the 13th-century Norse work Konungs Skuggsjá (King's Mirror). It describes the werewolves as being humans who were cursed as a divine punishment for wickedness. According to the account,

It is told that when the holy Patricius (St Patrick) preached Christianity in that country, there was one clan which opposed him more stubbornly than any other people in the land; and these people strove to do insult in many ways both to God and to the holy man. And when he was preaching the faith to them as to others and came to confer with them where they held their assemblies, they adopted the plan of howling at him like wolves.

St Patrick responded by praying for God to punish the clan, resulting in them suffering "a fitting and severe though very marvellous punishment, for it is told that all the members of that clan are changed into wolves for a period and roam through the woods feeding upon the same food as wolves; but they are worse than wolves, for in all their wiles they have the wit of men, though they are as eager to devour men as to destroy other creatures." The werewolves were not permanently transformed, as they either took the form of a wolf every seventh winter or were transformed into a wolf for a seven-year period, following which they never transformed again.

== Gerald of Wales ==
The Norse account is clearly based on the earlier accounts of the Ossory werewolves, though without mentioning Ossory, and on a lengthy account in the 12th-century Topographia Hibernica (Geography of Ireland) by Gerald of Wales. Appointed as Archdeacon of Brecknock in 1175, he also worked as a historian and writer and accompanied the future King John of England on an expedition to Ireland in 1185. Gerald's Topographia presents the story of an unnamed priest who is travelling from Ulster to Meath when he encounters a wolf in the woods. To his amazement, the wolf tells him not to be afraid and talks about God. The priest begs the wolf not to harm him and urges him to explain. The wolf replies:

There are two of us, a man and a woman, natives of Ossory, who through the curse of one Natalis, saint and abbot, are compelled every seven years to put off the human form and depart from the dwellings of men. Quitting entirely the human form, we assume that of wolves. At the end of the seven years, if they chance to survive, two others being substituted in their places, they return to their country and their former shape. And now, she who is my partner in this visitation lies dangerously sick not inspired by divine charity, to give her the consolations of your priestly office.

The priest complies and performs the last rites over the sick female wolf. The male wolf pulls down the wolfskin of the female, revealing an elderly human female underneath, to reassure the priest that he is not committing blasphemy. After the priest has given communion to the woman/she-wolf, the male wolf leads him out of the woods and gives him a number of prophesies about the future of Ireland and its English invaders. The priest is subsequently summoned to a synod convened by the Bishop of Meath which, on Gerald's advice, orders the priest to appear before the Pope. Gerald himself is unable to attend but hears about the matter from the bishop's clerks.

As several commentators have noted, the story is unique in several respects. It is the only one in which a werewolf talks, and they are not conventional werewolves, undergoing a full transformation, but are still human beings under the wolfskins. As such, they are Christianised werewolves; they are people created in the image of God who have outwardly changed their appearance but retain their human intelligence and forms, albeit concealed. The werewolves are also held to be the victims of a curse inflicted on their community as collective punishment for their sins.

Gerald goes on to discuss the theological implications of his story, referring to accounts of werewolves in Augustine of Hippo's 5th-century work The City of God. He reiterates Augustine's views on metamorphosis:

We agree, then, with Augustine, that neither demons nor wicked men can either create or really change their natures; but those whom God has created can, to outward appearance, by his permission, become transformed, so that they appear to be what they are not; the senses of men being deceived and laid asleep by a strange allusion, so that things are not seen as they really exist, but are strangely drawn by the power of some phantom or magical incantation to rest their eyes on unreal and fictitious forms.

His account of the Ossory werewolves may also have had political undertones as a metaphor for the Norman conquest of Ireland. Catherine E. Karkov argues that the story implicitly portrays the Irish people themselves as being bestial in appearance, yet still redeemable through the Christian sacrament, as they were made in the image of God underneath it all. The old, dying female werewolf can be interpreted as a personification of Ireland and a symbol of the passing of the old order, from the native Irish church with its questionable practices to the English church.
