= Afterglow Vista =

Mausoleum in San Juan County, Washington

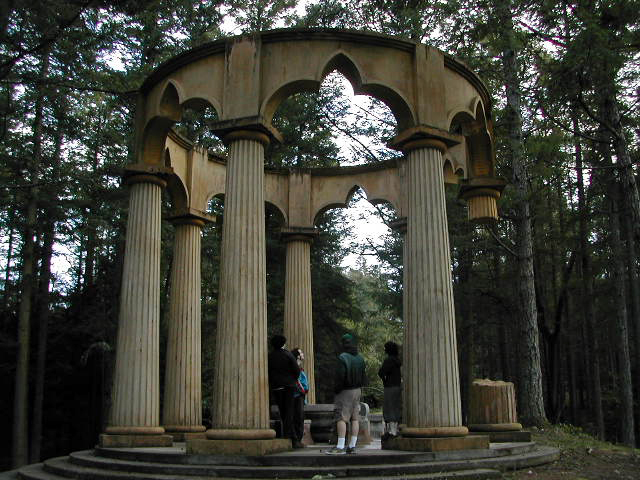
- Interactive map of Afterglow Vista
- Location: 664 Afterglow Dr, Friday Harbor, Washington, U.S.
- Coordinates: 48.615947°N 123.149003°W

Afterglow Vista (also known as the McMillin Memorial Mausoleum and Afterglow Mausoleum) is a mausoleum located in San Juan County, Washington, United States, near Friday Harbor and Roche Harbor. It is the final resting place of businessman John S. McMillin, his wife and children, and one of the family's employees. The design of the mausoleum incorporates numerous instances of symbolism, some of it Masonic in nature.

== Background and construction ==
Afterglow Vista serves as the final resting place of John S. McMillin and several members of his family. During his life, McMillin was a lawyer, businessman and political figure. Born in Indiana in 1855, McMillin attended DePauw University, where he became a member of the Sigma Chi fraternity, and served as the fraternity's first Grand Consul, or international president. In 1884, McMillin moved with his wife and son from Indiana to Washington Territory, where he became the owner of Tacoma and Roche Harbor Lime Company. He was also an ardent Freemason.

Six years before he died, McMillin ordered for Afterglow Vista to be built. Construction was completed in 1936, the year of McMillin's death, and cost $30,000.

== Design ==
The mausoleum is located in a wooded area, and can be accessed by following a trail through a set of gates topped with the words "Afterglow Vista".

The mausoleum itself consists of an open-air rotunda with a limestone table in its center. Around the table are several stone chairs for each member of the McMillin family, inside each of which are hollow niches containing the cremated ashes of the family members. Inscribed on the backs of the chairs are the corresponding names of each individual. There are numerous instances of Masonic symbolism incorporated into the mausoleum's design. Surrounding the stone table and chairs are six columns, along with one intentionally broken column. The broken column is meant to symbolize the concept that "death breaks the column of any man's life", or alternately, to represent the idea of unfinished work in one's life. The steps leading to the stone table and chairs represent "stages of life, orders in architecture, the human senses, and the liberal arts and sciences."

Afterglow Vista has been called a "Masonic landmark". The mausoleum's care is monitored by the Sigma Chi fraternity's Monuments and Memorials Commission.

== Interments ==
Afterglow Vista serves as the final resting place of John S. McMillin, his wife Louella Hiett, their sons John Hiett McMillin (born and died 1878), Fred Hiett McMillin (1880 – 1922), and Paul Hiett McMillin (1886 – 1961), and their daughter Dorothy Hiett McMillin (1894 – 1980). Additionally, the cremated ashes of Adah Beeny (also spelled Ada Beane), who served as a caretaker of the McMillin children or as John S. McMillin's personal secretary, are interred in John Hiett McMillin's crypt.

== See also ==
- Tacoma Mausoleum
