= John S. McMillin =

American lawyer

- Born: October 28, 1855; Sugar Grove, Indiana, U.S.
- Died: November 3, 1936 (aged 81)
- Occupations: Lawyer, businessman
- Political party: Republican
- Spouse: Louelle Hart (m. 1877)
- Children: 4
- Relatives: The Reverend William B. McMillin (brother)

John Stafford McMillin (October 28, 1855 – November 3, 1936) was an American lawyer, businessman and political figure. Born in Sugar Grove, Indiana, McMillin attended DePauw University and became a member of the Sigma Chi fraternity. He practiced law in Lafayette before moving to Washington Territory, where he became the president and general manager of the Tacoma Lime Company, a limeworks.

In 1886, McMillin and his partners in the Tacoma Lime Company bought Roche Harbor, Washington, and incorporated the Tacoma and Roche Harbor Lime Company, of which McMillin again served as president and general manager. McMillin built the Hotel de Haro in Roche Harbor, and became involved in politics. He ran for the United States Senate in 1895, served as a member of the Washington state railroad commission, and was a delegate to the Republican National Convention from Washington in 1924 and 1932. He was also an ardent Freemason.

== Early life, education and family ==
John S. McMillin was born in Sugar Grove, Indiana on October 28, 1855. He had a brother, the Reverend William B. McMillin. John S. McMillin attended DePauw University in Greencastle, Indiana, and became a member of the Sigma Chi fraternity, serving as the fraternity's first Grand Consul, or international president. He graduated from DePauw University with a Bachelor of Arts degree in 1876, and received a Master of Arts degree in 1879. He remained active in fraternity affairs throughout his adult life, and installed Sigma Chi chapters at a number of universities, including Washington State University, Whitman in Walla Walla, WA, and the University of Oregon.

=== Marriage and children ===
On June 5, 1877, McMillin married Louella Hiett. Their first son, John Hiett McMillin, died shortly after being born on July 16, 1878. They had two more sons: Fred Hiett McMillin (September 16, 1880 – 1922) and Paul Hiett McMillin (1886 – 1961). They also had one daughter, Dorothy Hiett McMillin (1894 – 1980).

== Career ==
In 1877, McMillin was admitted to the bar in Lafayette, Indiana, where he worked as a lawyer until 1884. In January 1884, McMillin's family followed William B. McMillin and his family to Washington Territory. There, John S. McMillin invested in the Tacoma Lime Company, a limeworks, and became the company's president and general manager.

In 1886, after investigating the limestone deposits present in Roche Harbor, Washington, McMillin and his partners in the Tacoma Lime Company bought Roche Harbor from brothers Richard and Robert Scurr. The Tacoma and Roche Harbor Lime Company was soon incorporated, and McMillin was elected to serve as its president and general manager. McMillin also served as the president and general manager of the Staveless Barrel Company of Roche Harbor. In addition to his managerial roles, McMillin was responsible for the construction of Hotel de Haro, a 20-room hotel in Roche Harbor.

McMillan ran for the United States Senate in 1895, but was unsuccessful. From 1905/06 to 1908, he served as a member of the Washington state railroad commission. He was also a member of the committee to notify Theodore Roosevelt of his nomination. McMillan was a delegate to the Republican National Convention from Washington in 1924 and 1932.

== Death and interment ==
McMillin died on November 3, 1936, and his son Paul succeeded him in leading the Tacoma and Roche Harbor Lime Company. Six years before he died, John S. McMillin ordered the construction of Afterglow Vista (also known as the McMillin Memorial Mausoleum or Afterglow Mausoleum), a structure that serves as the final resting place of himself and members of his immediate family. His cremated remains are interred at Afterglow Vista, along with the remains of his wife and children.
