= New England vampire panic =

Reaction to an outbreak of tuberculosis in the 19th century

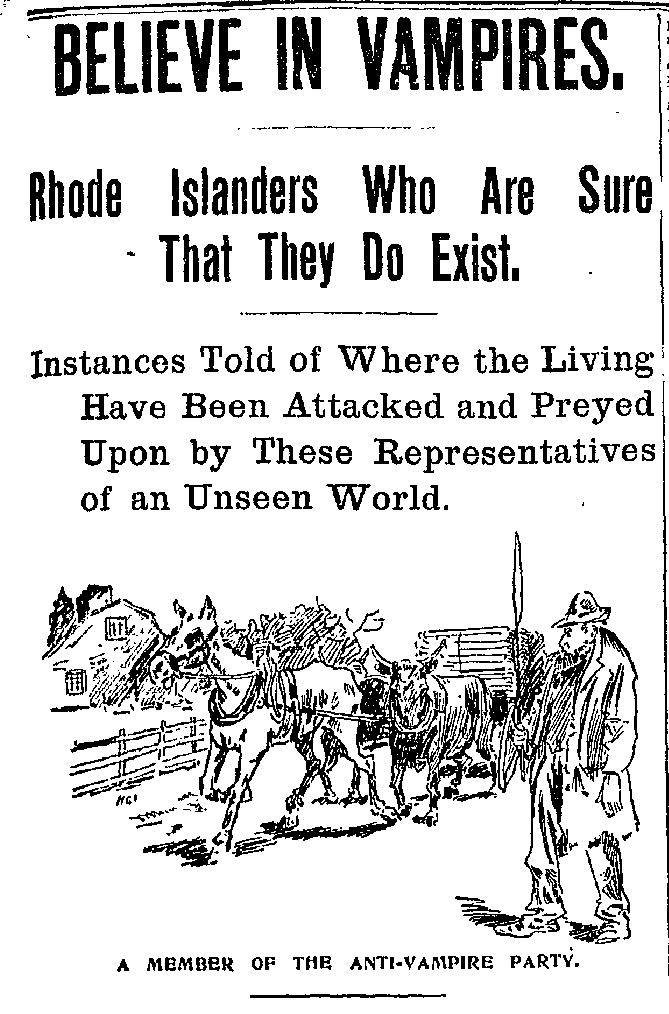
Satirical cartoon from the Boston Daily Globe accompanying an article describing superstitious beliefs in rural Rhode Island

The New England vampire panic was the reaction to an outbreak of tuberculosis in the late 18th and 19th centuries throughout Rhode Island, eastern Connecticut, southern Massachusetts, Vermont, and other areas of the New England states. Consumption (tuberculosis) was thought to be caused by the deceased consuming the life of their surviving relatives. Bodies were exhumed and internal organs ritually burned to stop the deceased "vampire" from attacking the local population and to prevent the spread of the disease. Notable cases provoked national attention and comment, such as those of Mercy Brown in Rhode Island and Frederick Ransom in Vermont.

== Background ==
Tuberculosis was known as "consumption" at the time, as it appeared to consume an infected person's body. It is now known to be a bacterial disease, but the cause was unknown until the late 19th century. The infection spreads easily among a family; thus, when one family member died of consumption, other members were often infected and gradually lost their health. People believed that this was due to the deceased TB sufferer draining the life from other family members. The belief that consumption was spread in this way was widely held in New England and in Europe.

In an attempt to protect the survivors and ward off the effects of consumption, bodies of those who had died of the disease were exhumed and examined. The corpse was deemed to be feeding on the living if it was determined to be unusually fresh, especially if the heart or other organs contained liquid blood. After the culprit was identified, there were a number of proposed ways to stop the attacks. The most benign of these was simply to turn the body over in its grave. In other cases, families would burn the "fresh" organs and rebury the body; occasionally, the body would be decapitated. Affected family members would also inhale smoke from the burned organs or consume the ashes in a further attempt to cure the consumption.

One of the early cases, in the late 18th century, was that of Rev. Justus Forward (1730-1814), the eminent Yale-educated pastor of the Congregationalist church at Belchertown, Massachusetts in the western part of the state near Springfield. He served the church for nearly six decades by the time of his death in 1814.

By July 1788, he and his wife had lost three daughters to consumption, including Martha Forward Dwight. She had died in 1782 at age 23. Two more were ill, including daughter Mercy, who had begun hemorrhaging. He wrote in a letter:

this morning [July 21] opened the grave of my daughter [Martha]... who had died—the last of my three daughters—almost six years ago ... On opening the body, the lungs were not dissolved, but had blood in them, though not fresh, but clotted. The lungs did not appear as we would suppose they would in a body just dead, but far nearer a state of soundness than could be expected. The liver, I am told, was as sound as the lungs. We put the lungs and liver in a separate box, and buried it in the same grave, ten inches or a foot, above the coffin.

Their daughter Mercy died in January 1789.

== Documented victims ==
Date of exhumation	Name and lifespan	Location of exhumation	Notes
1793	Rachel (Harris) Burton (1770–1790)	Manchester, Bennington County, Vermont	Congregational Deacon Capt. Isaac Burton exhumed his first wife, Rachel, in an attempt to save his second wife Hulda (Powell) Burton who was dying of tuberculosis. The effort failed and Hulda died in September 1793.
ca 1810	Unnamed New Ipswich resident	New Ipswich, Hillsborough County, New Hampshire	Dr. John Clough of New Ipswich, N.H. reported in "The Influence of the Mind on Physical Organization" in the Boston Medical and Surgical Journal Volume XXI (1840): "In connection with [these superstitions], I cannot omit to mention a circumstance which occurred in this town (New Ipswich), not thirty years since, and similar occurrences probably occurred in many other towns in New England. This was disinterring a human body, which belonged to a family all strongly predisposed to consumption, for the purpose of removing the heart, which was burned, the ashes of which were considered a sovereign remedy to those of the family who were still living, and might be afflicted with the same disease. This only illustrates the fact that those elements of character which held such a magic sway over the minds of men in ancient times, have not ceased altogether to influence the community in our comparatively enlightened day."
1816–1817	Samuel Salladay (1789–1815)	Scioto County, Ohio	"A STRANGE SUPERSTITION. The family of Philip Salladay came from Switzerland, bought and settled on a lot in the French Grant soon after the opening of the country for settlement. Hereditary consumption developed itself in the family sometime after their location in Scioto county. The head of the family and the oldest son had died of it and others began to manifest symptoms, when an attempt was made to arrest the progress of the disease by a process which has been practised in numerous instances, but without success. They resolved to disinter one of the victims, take his entrails and burn them in a fire prepared for the purpose, in the presence of the surviving members of the family. This was accordingly done in the winter of 1816–17, in the presence of a large concourse of spectators who lived in the surrounding neighborhood, and by Major Amos Wheeler, of Wheelersburg. Samuel Salladay was the one they disinterred and offered up as a sacrifice, to stop if possible the further spread of the disease. But like other superstitious notions with regard to curing diseases it proved of no avail. The other members of the family continued to die off until the last one was gone except George."
1817	Frederick Ransom (1797–1817)	South Woodstock, Windsor County, Vermont	See below.
1843	John Barber (1788-1843)	Griswold, New London County, Connecticut	In 1990, children playing in a gravel pit unearthed human skulls, leading to the discovery of an old farm burial ground that had belonged to the Walton family. Most of the skeletons were unremarkable, but one was in a coffin marked with "JB 55" in tacks on the lid. This skeleton appeared to have been exhumed and reburied approximately 5 years after death, with its head and femurs removed and placed on the chest in the manner of a skull and crossbones. The ribcage had been broken open, presumably to remove the heart. Later DNA research suggested that the skeleton was that of farmer John Barber, with the tacks on the coffin lid therefore his initials and age at death. A nearby coffin was similarly labelled "NB 13", likely his son Nathan Barber who died in 1826 aged around 13. This identity was confirmed through further DNA research by Parabon NanoLabs in 2022.
ca 1860s	Anonymous sibling	Boston, Suffolk County, Massachusetts	In 1873, Dr. Lucy Abell reported to the Massachusetts State Board of Health: "I should be sorry to be understood as recommending drunkenness as a cure [for consumption]. But I have known several instances where nearly all the family from five to nine children have successively died of phthisis. Finally one of the boys from sheer desperation took to excessive drinking of alcoholic stimulants. These boys are now past middle life and enjoying good health when last heard from. In two families not less than five or six victims in each were carried off by consumption. In each there was always one sick and a short time before death another would be prostrated. In one family they resorted to that horrible relic of superstition the burning of the heart etc. of the dead and the ashes were swallowed by the survivors in the hopes that the fatal demon would be exorcised from the family, but it did not avail. But another son fell a victim and then the alcoholic treatment was tried not as an expected remedy but as a means of forgetfulness of impending doom and no deaths in the family have to my knowledge since occurred."
1892	Mercy Lena Brown (1872–1892)	Exeter, Washington County, Rhode Island	Mercy Brown vampire incident

=== Frederick Ransom ===
Frederick Ransom of South Woodstock, Vermont, died of tuberculosis on 14 February 1817 at the age of 20. His father was worried that Ransom would attack his family, so he had him exhumed and his heart burned on a blacksmith's forge. Ransom was a Dartmouth College student from a well-to-do family; it was unusual that he should fall victim of the vampire panic, which was most common among less educated communities.

=== Mercy Brown ===
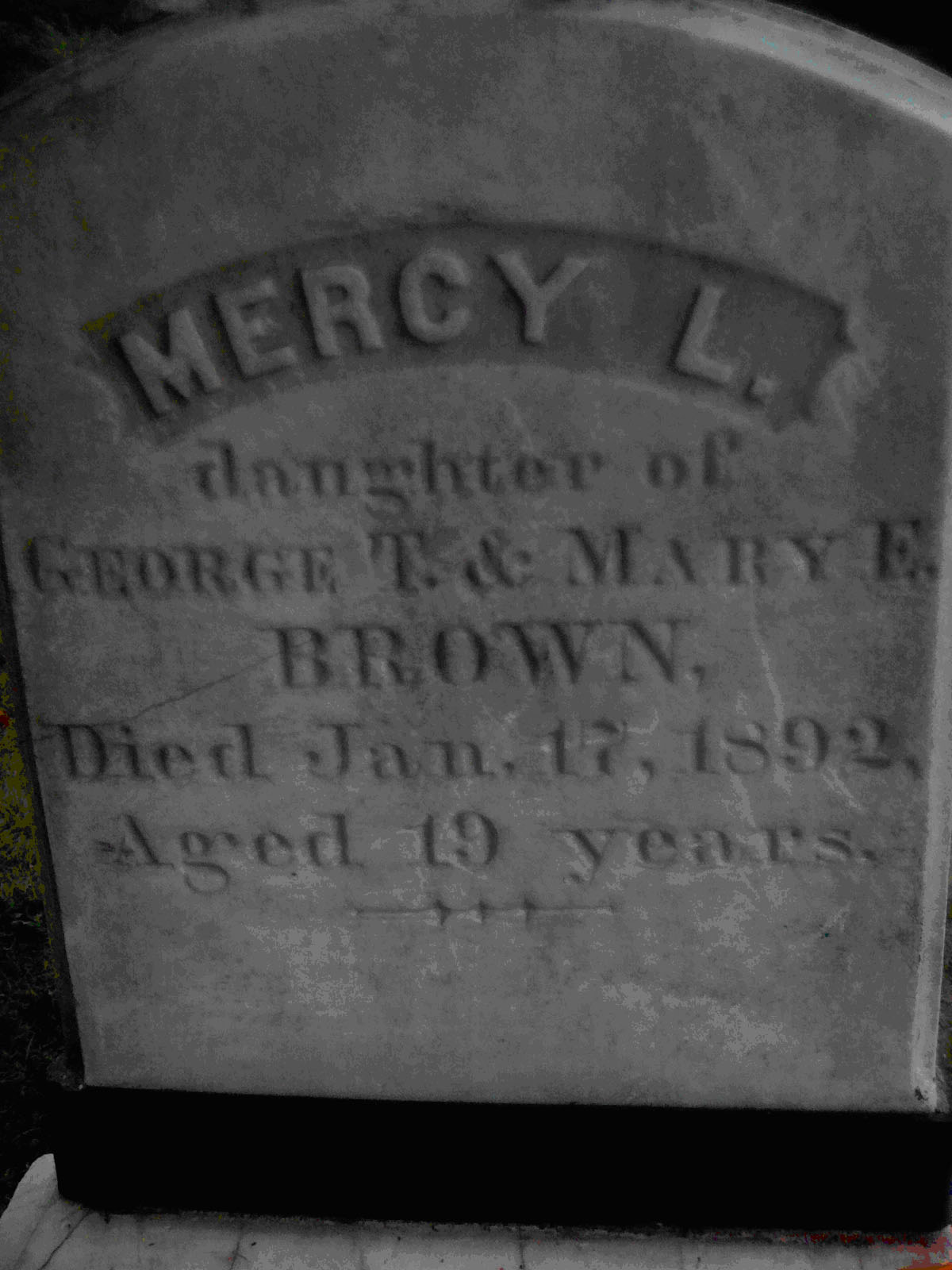
Gravestone of Mercy Brown, a young woman in Rhode Island accused of vampirism

One of the more famous cases is that of Mercy Lena Brown. Mercy's mother contracted consumption which spread to the rest of the family, moving to her sister, her brother, and finally to Mercy. Neighbors believed that one of the family members was a vampire who had the illness. Two months after Mercy's death, her father George Brown—who did not believe that a vampire was to blame—reluctantly permitted others to exhume the bodies of his family. They found that Mercy's body showed little decomposition, had "fresh" blood in her heart, and had turned in the grave. This was enough to convince the villagers that Mercy Brown was the cause of the consumption. The heart of the exhumed body was burnt, mixed with water, and given to her surviving brother to drink in order to stop the influence of the undead. The cure was unsuccessful.

== Contemporary reaction ==
Henry David Thoreau wrote in his journal of 26 September 1859: "The savage in man is never quite eradicated. I have just read of a family in Vermont—who, several of its members having died of consumption, just burned the lungs & heart & liver of the last deceased, in order to prevent any more from having it," as a reference to contemporary superstition. When rural Rhode Islanders moved west into Connecticut, locals perceived them as "uneducated" and "vicious", which was partially due to the Rhode Islanders' beliefs in vampirism. Newspapers were also sceptical, calling belief in vampirism an "old superstition" and a "curious idea".

While the press dismissed this practise as superstition, the burning of organs was widely accepted as a folk medicine in other communities. In Woodstock, where local belief was still present, town records report hundreds of onlookers attending the burning of Frederick Ransom's heart."

== Terminology ==
It is unlikely that the deceased would have been known as vampires by their affected families, because the word was not in common use in the community at that time. However, the term was used by newspapers and outsiders at the time due to the similarity with contemporary vampire beliefs in eastern Europe.

These beliefs were very different from the vampires portrayed in modern popular culture. Michael Bell conducted an anthropological study of the phenomenon in New England, and he rejected that modern narrative: "No credible account describes a corpse actually leaving the grave to suck blood, and there is little evidence to suggest that those involved in the practice referred to it as 'vampirism' or to the suspected corpse as a 'vampire', although newspaper accounts used this term to refer to the practice."

== See also ==
- Salem witch trials
- Jewett City vampires
