= Mary Webster (alleged witch) =

American woman accused of witchcraft

- Born: Mary Reeve; Between 1617 and 1624; England
- Known for: Target of attempted lynching
- Spouse: William Webster (m. 1670)
- Parents: Thomas Reeve (father); Hannah Rowe (mother)

Mary Webster (née Reeve, fl. 1684) was a resident of colonial New England who was accused of witchcraft and was the target of an attempted lynching by friends of the accuser.

== Biography ==
=== Early life ===
Mary Webster, born Reeve, was born in England. The exact year of her birth is unknown, but accounts of her birthdate ranged from 1617 to 1624. Both her father and her brother were named Thomas Reeve. Her father lived in Springfield, Massachusetts. According to the New England Historical Society, her mother's name was Hannah Rowe Reeve. In 1670, Mary Reeve married William Webster and they settled in the small Puritan town of Hadley, Massachusetts. No records exist of Webster having had any children. He was 53, she was around 46.

William and Mary Webster had little money, lived in a small house and sometimes needed help from the town to survive.

=== Trial and ongoing abuse ===
In 1683, when Mary Webster was approximately 53 years old, she was accused and brought to trial before a jury in Boston "for suspicion of witchcraft" but cleared of charges and found not guilty.

In 1684, Webster was accused verbally by Philip Smith. Smith was a judge, a deacon, and representative of the town of Hadley. He has also been described as a "hypochondriac". He seems to have believed in the real power of witchcraft and that his afflictions were being magically caused by Mary Webster in collaboration with the devil.

While he lay ill, a number of brisk lads tried an experiment upon the old woman. Having dragged her out of her house, they hung her up until she was near dead, let her down, rolled her some time in the snow, and at last buried her in it and there left her, but it happened that she survived and the melancholy man died.

=== Publicized by the Mathers ===
Philip Smith's accusations, afflictions, and death were described within a few years in a publication by Cotton Mather entitled Memorable Providences, Relating to Witchcrafts. Mather names Smith but not Mary Webster. Mather describes how some friends of Smith "did three or four times in one night go and give Disturbance to the Woman". Mather claims that it was only during this night of vigilante violence perpetrated against Mary Webster that Smith was able to sleep peacefully. "Upon the whole, it appeared unquestionable that witchcraft had brought a period unto the life of so good a man", Mather concludes.

Cotton Mather's book was published in 1689, only a few years before the infamous witchcraft trials of 1692 and it followed a similar book recently published by his father, Harvard president Increase Mather in 1684. As early as 1681, Increase Mather had met with "ministers in this colony" and begun soliciting far and wide for instances and anecdotes of witchcraft. It is not known to what extent Increase Mather's solicitations (and the implied doctrinal views in support of the real power of witchcraft) may have directly influenced the circumstances in Hadley in 1683–1684. According to Thomas Hutchinson, prior to Increase Mather's book, it had been decades since anyone had been executed for witchcraft in New England, despite the occasional slur or spurious accusation.

After the witchcraft trials of 1692, many lamented the parts they had played, such as the famous public confession of Samuel Sewall accepting "blame and shame". In April of 1693, members of the Salem congregation launched a campaign (it would eventually succeed) to oust their minister Samuel Parris, accusing him of holding unorthodox views "Differing from the Opinion of the generality of the Orthodox Ministers of the Country". Though Parris' doctrinal views were contested and arguably unorthodox, they were in line with the views put forward over the previous decade by the Mathers. On October 20, 1690, Parris met with Cotton Mather and other ministers at the Harvard College library, in a newly formed group calling itself the Cambridge Association, to discuss problems with his congregation in Salem.

In the fall of 1693, the Mathers were continuing to push for more witchcraft trials and this inspired a letter writing campaign from a Boston wool merchant named Robert Calef. Among other things, Calef criticized them for suggesting "that hanging or chaining" a person can somehow "restore those that were at a distance tormented". Such notions, according to Calef, were "all tending ... to the dishonor of God and the endangering of the well-being of a people".

In spite of mounting criticism, Cotton Mather stuck to the lonely position and reprinted his account of Philip Smith and Mary Webster in 1702, albeit somewhat buried near the end of a very large folio of miscellaneous extracts titled Magnalia Christi Americana. There are small differences in the 1702 reprinting, for instance Mather clarifies that the vigilantes who attacked Mary Webster were "young men" and Mather strikes the previous reference to "one night", instead suggesting the vigilantes attacked her on three or four occasions. Mather adds an emphatic "yea" to further underscore the idea that these were the only occasions during which Smith was able to sleep over a time period that Mather broadens to include "all his illness".

== Popular culture ==
Canadian author Margaret Atwood stated of Webster: "On Monday, my grandmother would say Mary was her ancestor, and on Wednesday she would say she wasn't ... So take your pick." She made Webster the subject of her poem "Half-Hanged Mary", and dedicated her novel The Handmaid's Tale (1985) to her.
