= Lore (podcast) =

History podcast by Aaron Mahnke

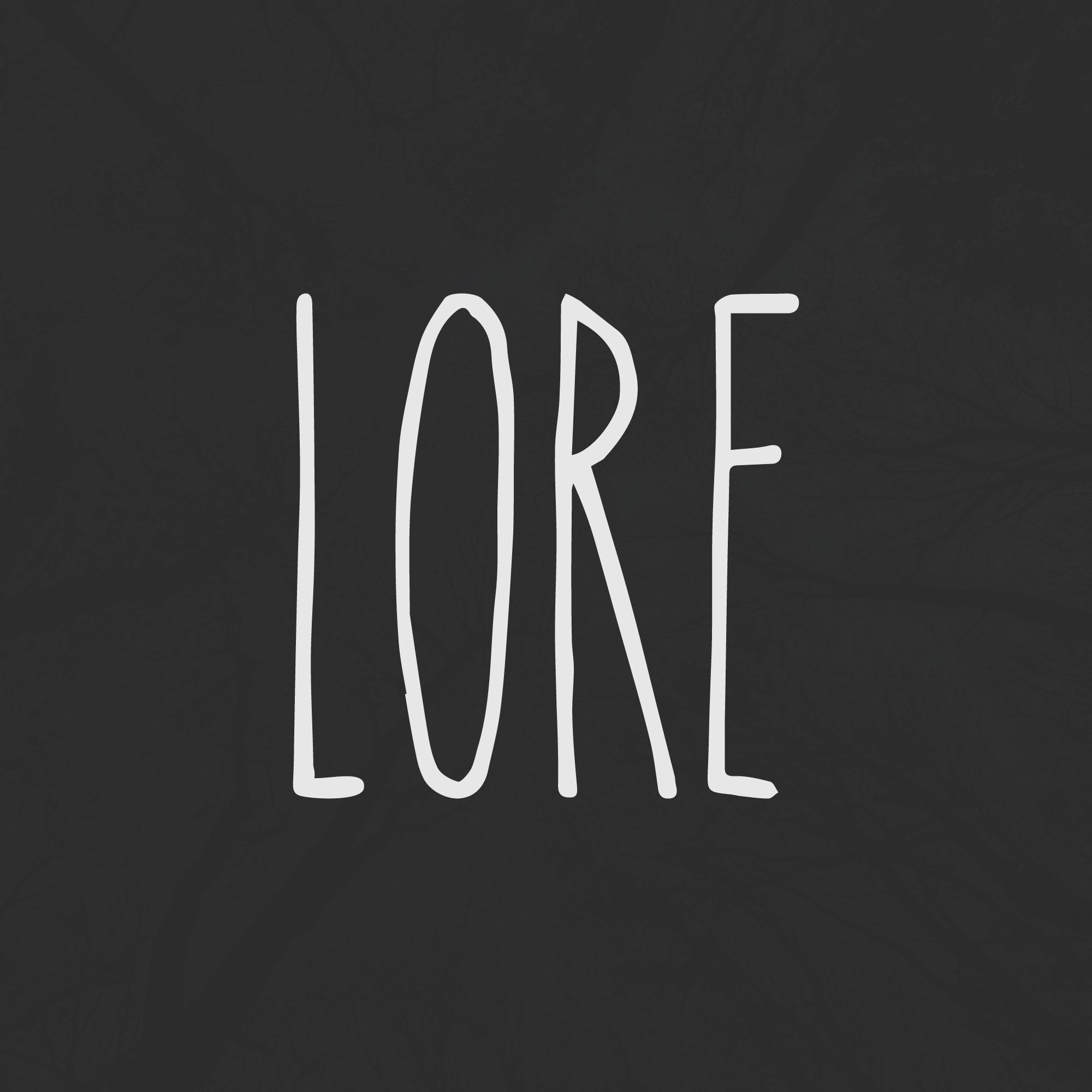
- Lore podcast logo
- Genre: Non-fiction; Horror podcast; Documentary

Creative team
- Written by: GennaRose Nethercott, Aaron Mahnke

Cast and voices
- Hosted by: Aaron Mahnke

Production
- Production: Aaron Mahnke
- Length: 17–44 minutes

Publication
- No. of episodes: 300
- Provider: Grim & Mild Entertainment
- Updates: Biweekly

Related
- Adaptations: Lore (TV series)
- Website: www.lorepodcast.com

Lore is a documentary podcast on topics such as folklore, legends, and historical events, often with a focus on the macabre. Each episode examines historical events or ancient/urban legends that show the dark side of human nature, and is presented in a style that has been compared to a campfire experience. The series was created in 2015 by Aaron Mahnke as a marketing experiment and received the iTunes "Best of 2015" Award. The podcast was also given the award for the "Best History Podcast" by the Academy of Podcasters in July 2016. At the end of 2016, the podcast was included in the top lists by The Atlantic and Entertainment Weekly. As of October 2017, the series has 5 million monthly listeners. The podcast surpassed 500 million downloads in November 2024.

The podcast airs on a bi-weekly basis, and is usually released on a Monday. The podcast is recorded in a studio in Mahnke's home office. Mahnke's voice in the podcast is described as "coolly mesmeric".

== Content ==
Each podcast episode features various stories bound together by a common theme. Mahnke spends an average of 20 hours a week researching the folkloric tales and has stated, "All of the material is from documented stories or historical events. Some are ancient and some are modern, but they are all factual in the sense that people reported these things and believed they were true."

=== Awards ===
Award	Date	Category	Result	Ref.
Discover Pods Awards	2017	Best Society & Culture Podcast	Runner-up	
Shorty Awards	2017	Podcasts	Finalist	
Academy of Podcasters	2016	Best History Podcast	Won	
Academy of Podcasters	2017	Best History Podcast	Finalist	
iTunes	2015	Best of 2015	Won	
iHeartRadio Podcast Awards	2020	Best History Podcast	Nominated	
iHeartRadio Podcast Awards	2022	Best History Podcast	Nominated	

== TV adaptation ==
Lore has been adapted for television with the help of Gale Anne Hurd of the hit television series The Walking Dead. Glen Morgan of The X-Files was announced as the showrunner, and the show was made in partnership with Valhalla Entertainment and Propagate Content. The series aired on Amazon Video followed the podcast's anthology format, with each episode featuring a new story and Mahnke remaining the narrator. The show premiered on 13 October 2017, and aired for two seasons before being cancelled in 2019.

The show has been praised by The Economist as "good viewing" that manages "to shock and surprise"; however, adding that "it falls short as a television show in its own right". In another review, The Verge said, "the show is able to turn the inherent creepiness of Mahnke's podcast into original stories that are even more unnerving and resonant".

== Book adaptations ==
Aaron Mahnke has authored a trilogy of books based on the Lore podcast.

- Mahnke, Aaron; Corley, M. S. (2017). The world of Lore: monstrous creatures. National Geographic Books. ISBN 978-1-5247-9796-6. OCLC 992182706.
- Mahnke, Aaron (2018). The world of Lore: Wicked mortals. National Geographic Books. ISBN 978-1-5247-9799-7. OCLC 1059143085.
- Mahnke, Aaron (2018). The world of Lore: dreadful places. Random House Worlds. ISBN 978-1-5247-9802-4. OCLC 1047580684.

== Related podcasts ==
Twice weekly, Mahnke also narrates a short podcast about weird events called Cabinet of Curiosities. He has a longform podcast called Unobscured which covers one subject per season, its first four seasons focusing on the Salem witch trials, Spiritualism, Jack the Ripper, and Grigori Rasputin.

== See also ==
- List of Lore podcast episodes
- Horror podcast
- List of history podcasts
- List of podcast adaptations
