= Tarzan (2003 TV series) =

- Genre: Adventure; Drama
- Based on: Tarzan characters created by Edgar Rice Burroughs
- Developed by: Eric Kripke; Mike Werb; Michael Colleary
- Starring: Travis Fimmel; Sarah Wayne Callies; Miguel A. Núñez Jr.; Leighton Meester; Mitch Pileggi; Lucy Lawless
- Opening theme: "Try" by Paloalto
- Composers: Jason Derlatka; Jon Ehrlich
- Country of origin: United States
- Original language: English
- No. of seasons: 1
- No. of episodes: 8

Production
- Executive producers: Eric Kripke; P. K. Simonds; David Nutter; David Gerber; Laura Ziskin
- Producers: Pamela Oas Williams; Peter R. McIntosh; Leonard Dick; Travis Fimmel
- Cinematography: Peter Wunstorf; Robert McLachlan; Scott Williams
- Editors: Stephen Mark; Scott K. Wallace; Elena Maganini; Mark Manos
- Running time: 45 minutes
- Production companies: Laura Ziskin Productions; David Gerber Productions; Warner Bros. Television

Original release
- Network: The WB
- Release: October 5 – November 23, 2003

Tarzan is an American adventure-drama television series that premiered on The WB on October 5, 2003, and ended on November 23, 2003. Based on the Tarzan series by Edgar Rice Burroughs and developed by Eric Kripke, Mike Werb and Michael Colleary, the show was set in New York City and depicted modern-day adaptations of Burroughs' characters. In December 2003, the series was canceled after eight episodes.

== Synopsis and creator commentary ==
NYPD detective Jane Porter's ordinary life is disrupted when a routine case unexpectedly leads her to John Clayton, who prefers to be called Tarzan. After being proclaimed dead for 20 years, John Clayton was found in the jungles of Africa by his billionaire uncle, Richard Clayton, who is the CEO of powerful Greystoke Industries. Held against his will at his uncle's home, Tarzan escapes and prowls all over the city, helping others in need. Upon meeting Jane, he begins to follow her from her home to crime scenes, simultaneously assisting her with her police cases.

Kripke was critical of the show, calling it "a piece of crap" and saying: "I'll stand behind the pilot. It has a beginning, middle, and -- the problem -- it ends. I was hungry to have anything in production, so I wrote a 50-page story that ended. Then it got made and I had something in production, and it was all my dreams come true. They said to me, 'Let's do 12 more.' I said, 'Uh, wait! What's the story?' So, Tarzan was a hell ride in every way, and we only did eight before they wisely put us out of our misery."

== Cast ==
=== Main ===
- Travis Fimmel as John Clayton Jr./Tarzan, the heir and shareholder of the Greystoke Industries
- Sarah Wayne Callies as Detective Jane Porter
- Miguel A. Núñez Jr. as Detective Sam Sullivan
- Leighton Meester as Nicki Porter, Jane's sister
- Mitch Pileggi as billionaire Richard Clayton, the CEO & shareholder of Greystoke Industries and Tarzan's uncle
- Lucy Lawless as Kathleen Clayton, a newspaper publisher, shareholder of Greystoke Industries and aunt of John Clayton Jr./Tarzan

=== Recurring and guest stars ===
- Douglas O'Keeffe as Patrick Nash
- Johnny Messner as Detective Michael Foster
- Fulvio Cecere as Detective Gene Taylor
- Joe Grifasi as Lieutenant Scott Connor
- Tim Guinee as Donald Ingram
- James Carroll as Howard Rhinehart
- Marcus Chait as Gary Lang
- David Warshofsky as Sheriff Tim Sweeney

== Episodes ==
No.	Title	Directed by	Written by	Original release date	Prod. code	Viewers (millions)
1	"Pilot"	David Nutter	Story by : Eric Kripke and Mike Werb & Michael Colleary; Teleplay by : Eric Kripke	October 5, 2003	176650	5.45
Detective Jane Porter meets John Clayton who escaped from his billionaire uncle's confinement at the headquarters of Greystoke Industries. Porter and her partner, Sam Sullivan involve themselves in a homicide case.
2	"Secrets and Lies"	David Nutter	Eric Kripke	October 12, 2003	176651	4.32
Tarzan assists Jane with a police case, helping her find a group of men responsible for attacking a young woman in Central Park. After discovering Tarzan is still alive, Jane's fiance Michael negotiates with Tarzan's uncle to capture him. Meanwhile, Jane contacts Tarzan's aunt, Kathleen Clayton, whom she hopes will protect Tarzan from his uncle.
3	"Wages of Sin"	David Solomon	P. K. Simonds	October 19, 2003	176652	3.77
Jane enlists Tarzan's help to aid her investigation by using his extraordinary tracking skills to find a child who has disappeared. Sam learns of Tarzan's involvement and his role in Michael's death, and becomes conflicted with the decision of turning Tarzan in.
4	"Rules of Engagement"	Perry Lang	Molly Newman	October 26, 2003	176653	3.05
Richard Clayton discovers that his estranged sister Kathleen has been sheltering Tarzan from him. Meanwhile, Jane meets the sole witness to Michael's death. Sam disagrees with her actions as she attempts to prevent the witness from testifying and possibly incriminating Tarzan before Richard can get to him.
5	"Emotional Rescue"	James Marshall	Leonard Dick	November 2, 2003	176654	2.80
Nicki worries over her friend's disappearance. Jane and Sam suspect a man whom Nicki's friend met over the internet and who may be more dangerous than he appears. As the investigation on Michael's killer continues, Jane pleads to Tarzan to stay hidden at his aunt's house. However, Nicki enlists Tarzan's help to make sure her friend is safe.
6	"Surrender"	Harry Winer	Story by : Mere Smith; Teleplay by : Lynne E. Litt	November 9, 2003	176655	2.94
Coerced by Richard, Donald Ingram, the lone witness to Michael's death, falsely names Tarzan as the one responsible for the crime and in the process incriminating Jane as well. In exchange for Tarzan's safety, Kathleen contemplates on giving up her entire shares of Greystoke Industries to Richard. Tarzan considers returning to the jungle.
7	"For Love of Country"	Thomas J. Wright	Story by : Lynne E. Litt; Teleplay by : Leonard Dick & Mere Smith	November 16, 2003	176656	2.72
Tarzan and Jane flee into the mountains to escape the vengeful cops seeking to arrest them. Jane places her trust in Tarzan, relying on his jungle skills to survive in the woods.
8	"The End of the Beginning"	Peter Ellis	Lynne E. Litt & Michael Reisz	November 23, 2003	176657	2.77
The police arrest Jane and in exchange for Jane's safety and freedom, Tarzan surrenders himself to Richard. Richard attempts to have Tarzan declared legally insane so that he can claim legal custody of him and his Greystoke shares. In the meantime, Kathleen fights to free them both. But when Richard goes back on his promise to help Jane, Tarzan breaks free and begins hunting Richard.

== List of songs used ==
The opening theme song is "Try" by Paloalto.

#	Episode	Songs
1.	Pilot	"Everybody Got Their Something" by Nikka Costa; "I'm with You" by Avril Lavigne; "Phobic" by Plumb; "Go" by Plumb
2.	Secrets and Lies	"Fly Away" by Kristin Mainhart; "Fallen" by Sarah McLachlan
3.	Wages of Sin	"Recall" by Luckytown; "I Saw" by Matt Nathanson; "Forever" by The Red West
4.	Rules of Engagement	"If You Asked" by Longview; "Hollow" by Casey Stratton; "New York City" by The Peter Malick Group featuring Norah Jones
5.	Emotional Rescue	"Give It Up" by Fefe Dobson; "Supermoves" by Overseer; "Breathe In" by Paloalto; "Ghosts" by Sleeping At Last
6.	Surrender	"White Flag" by Dido; "So Are You to Me" by Eastmountainsouth; "Freetime by Kenna
7.	For Love of Country	"It's You" by Michelle Branch; "Falling for You " by Longview; "All My Life" by Rosie Thomas
8.	The End of the Beginning	"Burn" by Sense Field; "Show Me the River" by Eastmountainsouth

== Reception ==
On Metacritic the show has a score of 45% based on reviews from 21 critics, indicating "mixed or average reviews".
