= Lara Croft: Tomb Raider =

2001 film by Simon West

- Theatrical release poster
- Directed by: Simon West
- Screenplay by: Patrick Massett; John Zinman
- Story by: Sara B. Cooper; Mike Werb; Michael Colleary
- Adaptation by: Simon West
- Based on: Tomb Raider by Core Design
- Produced by: Lawrence Gordon; Lloyd Levin; Colin Wilson
- Starring: Angelina Jolie; Jon Voight; Iain Glen; Noah Taylor; Daniel Craig
- Cinematography: Peter Menzies Jr.
- Edited by: Glen Scantlebury; Dallas S. Puett
- Music by: Graeme Revell
- Production companies: Paramount Pictures; Mutual Film Company; Lawrence Gordon Productions; Eidos Interactive; Tele München Group; BBC Films; Marubeni; Toho-Towa
- Distributed by: Paramount Pictures (United States and United Kingdom); United International Pictures (United Kingdom); Concorde Filmverleih (Germany); Toho-Towa (Japan)
- Release dates: June 15, 2001 (United States and Canada); June 28, 2001 (Germany); July 6, 2001 (United Kingdom); October 6, 2001 (Japan)
- Running time: 100 minutes
- Countries: Germany; Canada; Japan; United Kingdom; United States
- Language: English
- Budget: $115 million
- Box office: $274.7 million

Lara Croft: Tomb Raider is a 2001 action adventure film directed by Simon West and written by Patrick Massett and John Zinman, based on the Tomb Raider video game series by Core Design. An international co-production between the United States, Canada, United Kingdom, Japan and Germany, the film stars Angelina Jolie as Lara Croft, with the cast also featuring Jon Voight, Iain Glen, Noah Taylor, and Daniel Craig. The story revolves around Lara Croft trying to obtain ancient artifacts in competition with the Illuminati.

Development of a film adaptation of Tomb Raider began when Paramount Pictures acquired the film rights to the franchise in 1998. Originally intended for release in 2000, the project went through numerous scripts and screenwriters, resulting in production delays. Lara's sex appeal was scaled down for the film following pressure from franchise owner Eidos Interactive and to ensure a PG-13 rating. Filming took place in Cambodia and England from July to November 2000.

Lara Croft: Tomb Raider was released in the United States and Canada on June 15, 2001, to generally negative reviews, with criticism for the plot and action sequences, although Jolie was praised for her performance. The film grossed $274.7 million worldwide, making it one of the highest-grossing video game adaptations. A sequel, Lara Croft: Tomb Raider – The Cradle of Life, was released in 2003, with Jolie reprising her role.

== Plot ==
Adventurer Lara Croft defeats a robot in an Egyptian tomb, revealed to be a training exercise arena in her family manor, where she lives with her technical assistant Bryce and butler Hillary. In Venice, as the first phase of a planetary alignment begins, the Illuminati search for a key to rejoin halves of a mysterious artifact, "the Triangle," which must be completed by the final phase, a solar eclipse. Manfred Powell assures the cabal that the artifact is almost ready, but has no real idea of its location.

Lara's father Lord Richard Croft, long missing and presumed dead, appears to her in a dream. Lara awakens to a mysterious ticking, and finds a strange clock hidden inside the manor. On her way to consult a friend of her father's, Wilson, Lara crosses paths with Alex West, an American associate and fellow adventurer. Lara shows Wilson the clock, and he puts her in touch with Powell. Lara shows Powell photographs of the clock, which he claims not to recognize.

That night, armed commandos invade the house and steal the clock, bringing it to Powell. The next morning, a prearranged letter from Lara's father arrives, explaining that the clock is the key to retrieving the halves of the Triangle of Light, an ancient object with the power to control time. After misuse of its power destroyed an entire city, the Triangle was separated: one half was hidden in a tomb at Angkor, Cambodia, and the other in the ruined city located at Ukok Plateau, Siberia. Her father tasks her to find and destroy both pieces before the Illuminati can exploit the Triangle's power.

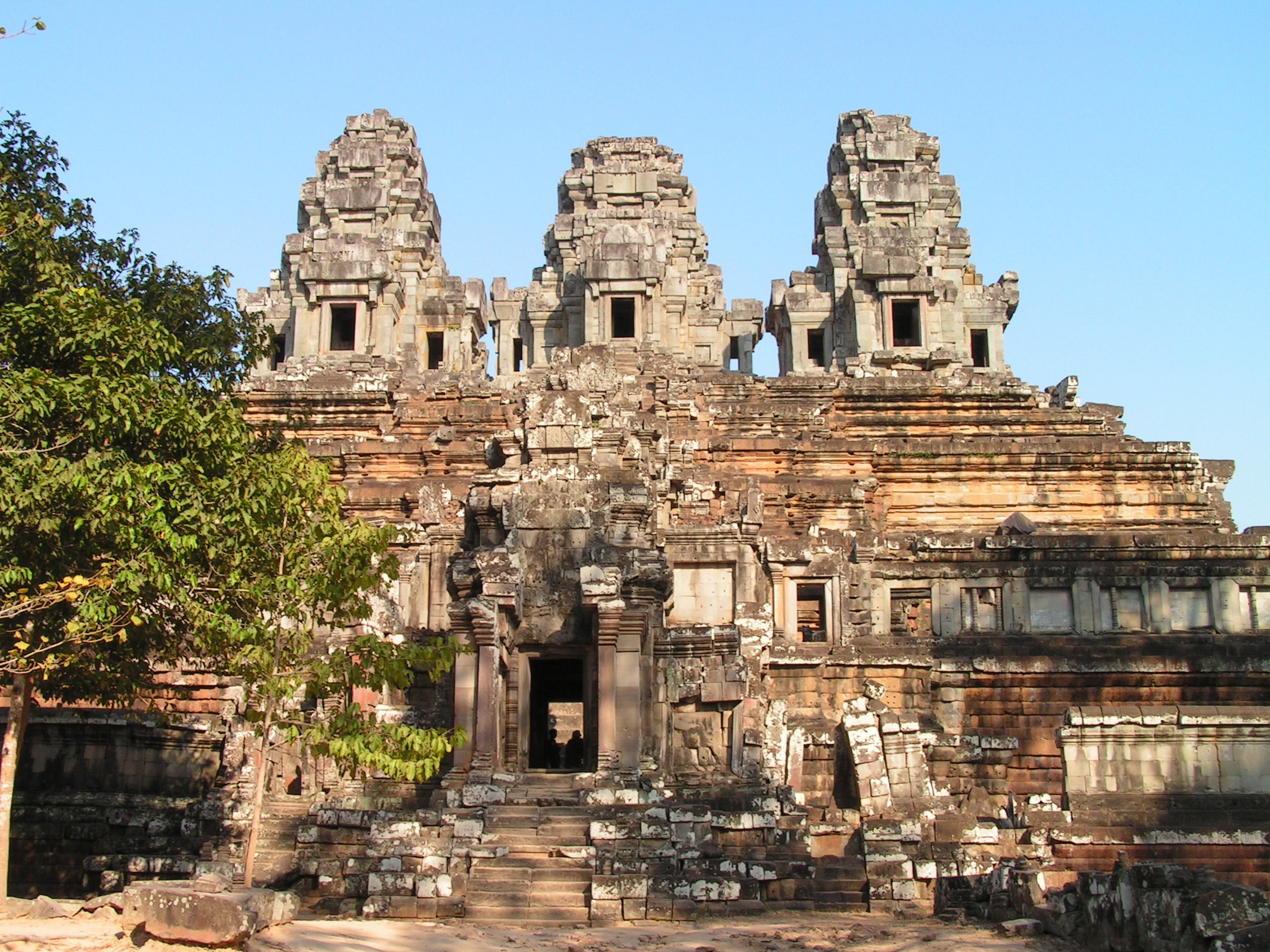
Ta Keo at Angkor

In Cambodia, Lara finds Powell, who has hired West, and his commandos already at the temple. West solves part of the temple's puzzle, and Powell prepares to insert the clock at the moment of alignment. Lara, realizing they made a mistake, finds the correct keyhole; with only seconds left, Lara persuades Powell to throw her the clock. She unlocks the first piece of the Triangle, and the statues of the temple come to life and attack the intruders. West, Powell, and his remaining men flee with the clock, leaving Lara to defeat an enormous six-armed guardian statue. She escapes with the first piece; recovering at a Buddhist monastery, she arranges a meeting with Powell.

In Venice, Italy, Powell proposes a partnership to find the Triangle, and informs Lara that her father was a member of the Illuminati, and offers to use the Triangle's power to resurrect him; though reluctant, she agrees to join forces. Lara and Bryce travel with Powell, West, and the leader of the Illuminati to Siberia. Entering the tomb, they discover a giant orrery, which activates as the alignment nears completion. Lara retrieves the second half of the Triangle, and Powell kills the Illuminati's leader to restore the Triangle himself, but the halves will not fuse. Realizing Lara knows the solution, Powell kills West to persuade her to complete the Triangle to restore West's and her father's lives. Lara complies, but seizes the Triangle herself.

In a "crossing" of time, Lara faces her father, who urges her to destroy the Triangle for good rather than save his life. Returning to the tomb, Lara manipulates time to save West and stab Powell, and destroys the Triangle. The tomb begins to collapse, and all flee but the wounded Powell, who reveals to Lara that he murdered her father. After a hand-to-hand fight, she kills Powell, retrieves her father's pocket watch, and escapes the tomb.

Back in her manor, Lara visits her father's memorial and finds that Bryce has reprogrammed the robot, and Hillary presents her with her pistols, which she takes with a smile.

== Cast ==
- Angelina Jolie as Lara Croft, a British adventurer and archaeologist
  - Rachel Appleton as young Lara
- Iain Glen as Manfred Powell, leader of the Illuminati
- Jon Voight as Lord Richard Croft, Lara's father
- Daniel Craig as Alex West, a former acquaintance of Lara and rival treasure hunter who teams with Powell for financial gain
- Noah Taylor as Bryce, Lara's tech expert
- Richard Johnson as the Distinguished Gentleman
- Chris Barrie as Hillary, Lara's butler
- Julian Rhind-Tutt as Mr Pimms
- Leslie Phillips as Wilson

== Production ==
=== Development and writing ===
Paramount Pictures acquired the film rights to the Tomb Raider video game franchise in early 1998, and announced Lawrence Gordon and Lloyd Levin as the prospective film's producers. The film went through many drafts and screenwriters between 1998 and 2000, which resulted in production delays. In March 1998, screenwriter Brent V. Friedman, who had co-written another video game film adaptation Mortal Kombat Annihilation the year before, was hired to write the first version of the screenplay. The original story pitch for the film was for it to be an all out hard R-rated action horror that extensively featured gore and female nudity, with the plot involving Egyptian Book of the Dead. Once this version was rejected, mostly due to budgetary concerns, in July 1998 Friedman wrote his first draft to be an action adventure thriller, which was about Lara Croft and her American partner called Dodge looking for El Dorado, while dealing with an Australian mercenary group who is also after it. Their search takes them through Caribbean and Ecuador, and the twist in the third act of the script would be the discovery of an ancient alchemical device called "The Black Veil", which can turn metal into gold, but mercenaries are after it because they want to use it to create plutonium.

Friedman's first draft was initially received very well by Paramount, but then it was decided to go with a different story. Friedman did write a second draft, but this one was rejected by Eidos Interactive, who by then made some demands about what could and could not be in the Tomb Raider film. He was then replaced by another screenwriter, Sara B. Cooper (who at that time was called Sara B. Charno). The new plot of her script included Lara trying to stop the "8th Wonder of the World", during a planetary alignment. The story also included alien creatures, and Lara being impregnated by one.

Once Charno's script was rejected as well, Steven E. de Souza was hired in September 1998 to write a new script. De Souza previously wrote and directed another video game film adaptation, Street Fighter. His Tomb Raider script was about Lara and her expedition trying to find the Library of Alexandria, which contains some ancient powerful weapon, and which they discovered is somewhere in Kafiristan forests, before another expedition led by main villains finds it first. De Souza said he was contracted to write "story, treatment, draft, rewrite and polish", he wrote his second draft in February 1999, and he submitted his "revised, polished script in the first week of March 1999." De Souza's script got very good reactions, and in April 1999 director Stephen Herek signed on to direct the film, based on de Souza's script, and with a planned summer 2000 release date. It was also around this time when Angelina Jolie was first considered to star in the film, following over a year and a half long reports and rumors regarding the casting of Lara Croft for the film, and different actresses who were either attached, considered, or suggested for the role.

Harek wanted a new screenwriter to work with him, because he felt de Souza would be more on producers side than with him, since de Souza already made few films with them. Gordon and Levin then hired Patrick Massett and John Zinman to write another new script. Massett and Zinman first wrote forty pages long "scriptment", a mix of story treatment and the script, and after they were given a go ahead to write the script, they wrote their first draft in August 1999. In their script, the story had Lara and her partner, and main villains, looking for the tomb of Alexander the Great which contains the Shield of Achilles, which can make whoever is wearing it invincible and give him great powers, and they would be looking for the Shield in the mountains of Pakistan.

By October 1999, Massett and Zinman were replaced by another two screenwriters, Mike Werb and Michael Colleary, who just had big success with Face/Off, another Paramount film, and were working as script doctors for them and other studios. Werb and Colleary did a rewrite of de Souza's, Massett and Zinman's script, and their changes included changing the locations to the jungles of North Africa and India, the main villains were led by Lara's uncle and his illegitimate son, the script was also changed to be more action packed and exciting, and to focus more on Lara as "buxom heroine", such as adding humorous scenes where she has to use her body to get out of dangerous situations. Their script drafts also had some horror elements, for example a scene where Lara and some other characters end up in a tomb with "hallucinogenic fungal spores" which cause them to see nightmarish visions of wild beasts and monsters attacking them, or a later scene where Lara fights against man-eating demon dog Cerberus.

Harek left the project, leaving Paramount with little time to find a director who was going to continue working on it. Simon West was then signed on as a new director, and Paramount even removed him from working on developing a film adaptation of 1960's TV series The Prisoner, which he had been working on for more than a year by that point, just to make sure he would work on Tomb Raider. West had a lot of issues with earlier drafts, and decided to work on a new script himself. He did this by taking Massett and Zinman script, which he felt was the best of all, and then took parts from all other scripts, and put them together into a new script, along with everything which he wrote. Werb and Colleary did work with West briefly, but they had a lot of creative differences with him. The release date was pushed from summer of 2000 to summer of 2001, mostly due to constant rewrites of the script. After the film officially went into production, new writers were brought in to work on the script rewrites at different points; Paul Attanasio, who was doing a lot of uncredited script doctoring on films at the time. Brannon Braga, who just co-wrote Mission: Impossible 2 for Paramount. Laeta Kalogridis, who at the time was also doing uncredited script doctoring on some films, and was working on co-writing (with her writing partner Patrick Lussier) another female led action adventure film, an early adaptation of Red Sonja, for which Jolie was also rumored to be considered for, along with some other actresses, but which was left unproduced.

Once Jolie was officially cast as Lara, she also had some input into the script, such as adding the entire background between Lara and her father, which West agreed with, and she and Jon Voight wrote their scenes together. Jolie also pushed for more "sexy scenes" with Lara to be added, for example in Kalogridis's draft from July 2000 the shower scene was longer and with opening credits playing during it, and next scene where Lara walks out and drops the towel was also longer, with her walking around nude and surprising Hillary as he is working on something. However, Eidos kept pushing Jolie's and Paramount's insistence on such scenes back, since one of the demands by Eidos was not to show any nude or sex scenes with Lara. Despite this, even later in post-production, cuts had to be made on Jolie's nude scenes for PG-13 rating. More changes were made on the final script during production for various reasons, such as cutting down the scenes and action sequences taking place inside the jungles and instead have them take place in indoor locations which would have been easier to film in on sets (like temples), Lara and Illuminati trying to find three pieces of the Triangle (like it was originally written) instead of just two, or her and Powell's men being attacked by different creatures during the Cambodia temple action sequence instead of statues coming to life.

In the final film, Cooper, Werb and Colleary are credited for the story, while Massett and Zinman are credited for the screenplay. And while it ended up not being used for the first film, some of de Souza's material from his script ended up being used in the sequel, Lara Croft: Tomb Raider – The Cradle of Life, so much that he ended up having a story credit on it.

Some of the earlier scripts for the film included more scenes focusing on Lara's sex appeal, these include; Lara stripping down fully nude behind the curtain while talking with her partner (Brent V. Friedman's July 1998 first draft), Lara ripping her shirt off and flashing her breasts to some villains as a distraction (Steven E. de Souza's February 1999 second draft), Lara and her partner captured inside the tomb antechamber and her having to use her breasts to deal with some creature attacking them (Mike Werb & Michael Colleary's October 1999 draft), tied up Lara using her breasts to crush a giant poisonous millipede when it crawls under her tank top and between her breasts (Mike Werb & Michael Colleary's November 1999 revised draft). Jolie later stated that she was disappointed with how Lara's sexual appeal was scaled down, and how she thought Lara wasn't sexy enough in the final film.

=== Financing ===
Lara Croft: Tomb Raider was financed through Tele München Gruppe (TMG), a German tax shelter. The tax law of Germany allowed investors to take an instant tax deduction even on non-German productions and even if the film has not gone into production. By selling them the copyright for $94 million and then buying it back for $83.8 million, Paramount made $10.2 million. The copyright was then sold again to Lombard Bank, a British investment group and a further $12 million was made. However, to qualify for Section 48 tax relief, the production must include some UK filming and British actors, which was acceptable for a film partially set in the United Kingdom. Presales to distributors in Japan, Britain, France, Germany, Italy and Spain made a further $65 million. Showtime paid $6.8 million for premium cable television rights. In total, $94 million was put together.

=== Casting ===
The announcement of the film generated significant discussion about who would be cast to play Lara Croft. Numerous actresses (and non-actresses) were rumored to be on the shortlist, most notably Rhona Mitra (official model to Tomb Raider II), Jennifer Love Hewitt, Famke Janssen, Jennifer Lopez, Elizabeth Hurley, Ashley Judd, Sandra Bullock, Catherine Zeta-Jones, Diane Lane, Demi Moore and Denise Richards. Neve Campbell turned down the role due to her commitments with the television series Party of Five.

The casting of Jolie was controversial among many fans of the Tomb Raider series, with complaints about an American actress being hired to play a British character; others cited Jolie's tattoos and well-publicized controversial personal life. Director Simon West dismissed these concerns and said, in reference to Jolie's penchant for sexual knife play, "it was always Angelina. I mean, Lara sleeps with knives and doesn't take shit from anybody. That's [Angelina] down to a tee." Jolie wore a padded bra to increase her bust size when playing Lara. As she explained to NY Rock in June 2001: "C'mon, I'm not so flat chested to begin with. When I wear a tight T-shirt, I look a certain way. So it wasn't like we had to completely change me. You know, we just had to enhance me a little. I'm a 36C. Lara, she's a 36D. And in the game, she's a double D, so we took her down some. But we did give her a bit of padding there. For me, it was simply one size. So it was like having a padded bra. But no, I am not flat chested anyway. So we still made it Lara Croft, but we didn't go to any extremes. And Lara doesn't apologize for herself, and for having that, you know, recognizable shape. So I'm not going to apologize for her either."

The film marked the feature film debut of television actor Chris Barrie, known for his role of Arnold Rimmer in the BBC science fiction comedy series Red Dwarf. English actor Daniel Craig adopts an American accent for the role of Alex West whilst Jolie takes on an English accent. Jon Voight, Angelina Jolie's father, plays Richard Croft, Lara's father in the film.

=== Filming ===
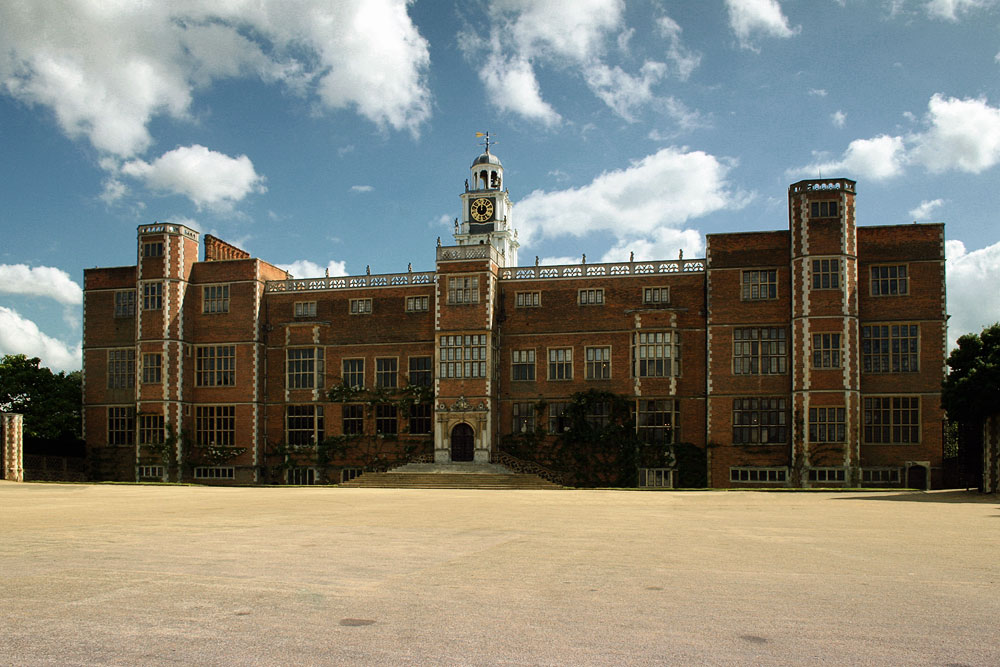
Hatfield House

Principal photography for Lara Croft: Tomb Raider took place from July 30 to November 30, 2000. Portions of the film were shot on location at the Ta Prohm temple, located in Angkor, Siem Reap Province, Cambodia. The film was the first major motion picture to be shot in Cambodia since Lord Jim in 1964, following the country's occupation by the Khmer Rouge regime. In addition to on-location shooting, a majority of the film's production also took place on the 007 Stage at Pinewood Studios. Hatfield House in Hertfordshire was used as Croft's home in the film.

=== Post-production ===
Simon West's first director's cut of the film was 130 minutes long, before it went through re-shoots some time later after principal photography was finished. West was removed from working on the film in post-production, however he did return to work on re-shoots. Editor Stuart Baird was brought in by Paramount to re-edit the film. Baird was promised the job of directing Star Trek: Nemesis by Paramount in exchange for re-editing the original 130-minute cut of this film and John Woo's original 210-minute cut of Mission: Impossible 2.

Due to post-production taking longer than expected, some major effects were left unfinished by the time the film was released in theaters. Baird re-edited the film down to 88 minutes. One of the bigger cuts on the film was changing the original score. Originally, Nathan McCree was hired to compose the score, as he had composed the music for the first three Tomb Raider games. But Paramount insisted on hiring actual movie composer. Greg Hale Jones started to work on the score with Peter Afterman in November 2000, after production was finished, and Danny Elfman composed the main theme for the film. Jones later said how once West was fired from the film, his score and Elfman's theme were shelved. Michael Kamen was then hired and submitted demos, and composed a full score which was rejected once the film was re-edited by Baird. Graeme Revell was then brought in and he had to compose sixty minutes of music inside ten days. Jerry Goldsmith was also attached to score the film, but he couldn't due to health problems at the time. John Powell was also considered to score the film at one point, prior to Kamen.

Despite the fact that a large amount of the film was cut, only four deleted scenes, seven minutes long in total, were included as extras on the film's DVD and Blu-Ray releases. Trailers for the film showed more deleted scenes. In July 2001, Simon West stated that he had prepared an alternate version of the film for a DVD release which would include deleted scenes, but this version was never released. Angelina Jolie's nude scenes were also cut out for a PG-13 rating. For example, the shower scene originally included actual nude shots, and next scene where she takes off her towel originally showed rear nudity by her. Even longer version of the opening shower scene was in the revised draft of the shooting script, but it was changed and toned down for the final film. The Digging Into Tomb Raider special feature for the film shows behind the scenes footage of Jolie and crew filming another shower scene, which takes place outdoor during the part of the film when Lara is in Cambodia, and which was deleted completely from the film.

== Music ==
Lara Croft: Tomb Raider is a 2001 soundtrack album to the film. The various artists soundtrack was released June 15, 2001. The Score was later released on June 25, 2001. The film also featured the songs "Lila" by Vas, "Inhaler" by Craig Armstrong, and a Piano rendition of "Largo" from Johann Sebastian Bach's Harpsichord Concerto no. 5 performed by Hae-won Chang. These were not featured on the soundtrack.

Graeme Revell composed the soundtrack in less than two weeks, following failed attempts by other composers. The CD was released through Elektra Entertainment.

== Home media ==
Lara Croft: Tomb Raider was released on DVD and VHS on November 13, 2001; a Blu-ray release followed on June 3, 2008. A 4K UHD Blu-ray release followed on February 27, 2018.

On the North American video rental charts, the film grossed $38.5 million in DVD rental revenue, as of December 2001. In the United Kingdom, it was watched by 7 million viewers on television in 2004, making it the year's sixth most-watched film (and third most-watched British film) on television.

== Reception ==
=== Box office ===
Lara Croft: Tomb Raider was a box office success as it debuted at number one with $48.2 million, ahead of Atlantis: The Lost Empire and Shrek, giving Paramount its second-best debut after Mission: Impossible 2 and the fifth-highest debut of 2001. In addition, it had the fourth largest June opening weekend, behind Jurassic Park, Austin Powers: The Spy Who Shagged Me and Batman Forever. It surpassed the opening record for a film featuring a female protagonist, previously held by Scary Movie ($42.3 million), as well as the opening record for a video game adaptation, previously set by Pokémon: The First Movie ($31 million). The film maintained its status as the highest-grossing video game adaptation until the release of Prince of Persia: The Sands of Time in 2010, and remains one of the highest-grossing video game-to-film adaptations. The opening weekend audience was 55 percent male and 45 percent female.

The film grossed a total of $131,168,070 domestically and $274,703,340 worldwide. Adjusted for inflation, Lara Croft: Tomb Raider remained the highest grossing adaptation of a video game at the domestic box office until the release of The Super Mario Brothers Movie in 2023.

=== Critical response ===
Lara Croft: Tomb Raider received generally negative reviews from critics. On review aggregator Rotten Tomatoes, 20% of 163 critic reviews are positive for the film, and the average rating is 4/10. The site's consensus is "Angelina Jolie is perfect for the role of Lara Croft, but even she can't save the movie from a senseless plot and action sequences with no emotional impact." Metacritic assigned the film a weighted average score of 33 out of 100, based on reviews from 31 critics, indicating "generally unfavorable" reviews. Audiences surveyed by CinemaScore gave the film a grade B on scale of A to F.

IGN gave the film the lowest out of all the scores, a 0.0 ("Disaster") rating, condemning everything from character performances to the ending. Todd McCarthy of Variety said "[the film] has the distinction of being a major motion picture that's far less imaginative, and quite a bit more stupid, than the interactive game it's based on." McCarthy praises Jolie but says "everything else about this frenetic production is flat and unexciting." A positive review came from Roger Ebert, who awarded the film three out of four stars and said, "'Lara Croft Tomb Raider' elevates goofiness to an art form. Here is a movie so monumentally silly, yet so wondrous to look at, that only a churl could find fault."

In 2018, IGN reported that the film was "generally regarded as one of the better video game adaptations". In 2021, British GQ listed Lara Croft: Tomb Raider as one of the "only video game adaptations worth watching". In 2023, The Vulture also commented that the film was "one of the select few times a big-budget video-game movie has actually worked."

=== Accolades ===
Award	Category	Recipient(s)	Result	Ref.
28th Saturn Awards	Best Science Fiction Film	Lara Croft: Tomb Raider	Nominated	
28th Saturn Awards	Best DVD Special Edition Release	Lara Croft: Tomb Raider	Nominated	
28th Saturn Awards	Best Actress	Angelina Jolie	Nominated	
2002 Kids' Choice Awards	Favorite Butt Kicker	Angelina Jolie	Nominated	
2002 MTV Movie Awards	Best Female Performance	Angelina Jolie	Nominated	
2002 MTV Movie Awards	Best Fight (vs. Robot)	Angelina Jolie	Nominated	
22nd Golden Raspberry Awards	Worst Actress (Note: also for her performance in Original Sin)	Angelina Jolie	Nominated	

== Themes ==
Director Simon West would comment a decade after its release that the creation of Lara Croft was influenced by a film market that "wasn't used to women leading summer blockbusters". This factor influenced his decision to cast Angelina Jolie who was not well known at the time, and not the studio's first choice (in contrast to Catherine Zeta-Jones, Ashley Judd, and Jennifer Lopez). West said that his decision to cast Jolie lay in the fact that "there hadn't been a female lead of an action-adventure film that had carried a film [by herself recently], and Angelina wasn't as big as some of the other actresses that were up for the part, who'd done bigger films and had a longer track record and bigger box-office grosses... Some of their [images] were safer than Angelina's, whose was quite dangerous. She had all sorts of thing written about her—some obviously not true. She was a young woman experimenting."

While Lara Croft's box office totals were the highest for a female-led action film at the time, and the film inspired theme park rides and led to a sequel, West stated in 2018 that "at the time, the studio was incredibly nervous at what the outcome could have been. I'm surprised it's taken so long [for other female-fronted action stories to rise up], because I thought that two or three years after, there'd be 10 other movies like it cashing in on its success ...[b]ut it's amazing how things work so slowly. But finally The Hunger Games and Wonder Woman have caught up!"

== Franchise ==
=== Sequel ===
Jolie returned in the 2003 sequel Lara Croft: Tomb Raider – The Cradle of Life. While it was viewed as a critical improvement over its predecessor, it did not repeat its financial success, grossing $160 million.

=== Reboot ===
GK Films first acquired the rights to reboot the film in 2011. In April 2016, Metro-Goldwyn-Mayer and GK Films announced a reboot of the film starring Alicia Vikander as Lara Croft with Roar Uthaug directing. It was released March 16, 2018, by Warner Bros. Pictures.

== See also ==
- List of films based on video games
- List of films featuring eclipses
