= Fanboy & Chum Chum =

American animated television series

- Genre: Animated sitcom Surreal comedy
- Created by: Eric Robles
- Voices of: David Hornsby; Nika Futterman; Jeff Bennett; Wyatt Cenac; Nolan North; Jamie Kennedy; Josh Duhamel; Candi Milo; Steve Tompkins; Dyana Liu; Estelle Harris
- Theme music composer: Brad Breeck
- Opening theme: "Fanboy & Chum Chum" (performed by The Mae Shi)
- Ending theme: "Fanboy & Chum Chum" (Instrumental)
- Composer: Brad Breeck
- Country of origin: United States
- Original language: English
- No. of seasons: 2
- No. of episodes: 52 (100 segments) (list of episodes)

Production
- Executive producers: Fred Seibert; Steve Tompkins; Eric Robles
- Producers: Therese Trujillo; Dean Hoff
- Running time: 22 minutes (11 minutes per segment)
- Production companies: Frederator Studios; Nickelodeon Animation Studio

Original release
- Network: Nickelodeon
- Release: October 12, 2009 – November 2, 2012
- Network: Nicktoons
- Release: July 12, 2014

Related
- Random! Cartoons

Fanboy & Chum Chum is an American animated television series created by Eric Robles for Nickelodeon. It is based on Fanboy, an animated short created by Robles that was broadcast on Random! Cartoons and was produced by Nickelodeon Animation Studio in association with Frederator Studios. The series was first broadcast on October 12, 2009, on Nickelodeon as a preview, then officially premiered after SpongeBob's Truth or Square. The series centers around Fanboy and Chum Chum, a pair of cheerful, playful, energetic, and fun-loving best friends enthusiastically obsessed with superhero comics, particularly those featuring their favorite superhero Man-Arctica. Their world is full of comic adventure, from an accidental case of Fanboy's teacher turning into a zombie to an ice monster running the Frosty Freezy Freeze machine.

The series' initial release on Nickelodeon finished on November 2, 2012. One episode, "Brain Freeze", was released on DVD in 2011 instead of being broadcast on television. However, it later aired on Nicktoons on July 12, 2014, serving as the series finale.

The theme song was written by Brad Joseph Breeck and performed by an experimental punk band, The Mae Shi.

== Premise ==
The series centers around Fanboy and Chum Chum, a pair of cheerful, playful, energetic, and fun-loving best friends enthusiastically obsessed with superhero comics, particularly those featuring their favorite superhero Man-Arctica. Their world is full of comic adventure (and misadventures) from an accidental case of Fanboy's teacher turning into a zombie to an ice monster running the Frosty Freezy Freeze machine.

== Episodes ==
Season	Episodes	Originally released	
Season	Episodes	First released	Last released
Pilot		August 14, 2007	
1	52	October 12, 2009	November 4, 2010
2	48	April 25, 2011	July 12, 2014

== Characters ==
=== Main ===
- Fanboy (voiced by David Hornsby) is an enthusiastic fan of comic books, fantasy, science fiction and action figures.
- Chum Chum (voiced by Nika Futterman and Nancy Cartwright in the pilot from Random! Cartoons) is Fanboy's best friend and sidekick. Although he is younger than the other main characters, he is still in the same class as them. Show creator Eric Robles explained on the Nickelodeon message board that this is because Fanboy snuck him into his class and the teacher never noticed the age difference. Chum Chum is incredibly loyal, sweet, playful, energetic, emotionally mature and high-spirited.

=== Supporting ===
- Kyle Bloodworth-Thomason (voiced by Jamie Kennedy) is an insecure pre-teen wizard who loathes Fanboy and Chum Chum, but secretly enjoys their friendship. Kyle was expelled from his wizarding school, Milkweed Academy, for turning his teacher Professor Flan into a raspberry flan. Kyle is now reluctantly enrolled in Fanboy and Chum Chum's public school, where he has very few friends other than Fanboy and Chum Chum. As Kyle struggles to be re-admitted to Milkweed, he often suffers painful indignities.
- Ozwald "Oz" Harmounian (voiced by Josh Duhamel) is the owner of the local comic shop, Oz Comix. Oz is a friend of the boys, who consider him "the most knowledgeable human being ever", though he is a nerdish know-it-all who lives with his elderly mother.
- Leonard "Lenny" Flynn-Boyle (voiced by Wyatt Cenac) is the accident-prone junior manager of the Frosty Mart (a parody of 7-Eleven). He finds Fanboy and Chum Chum irritating and sometimes gets a "stress twitch" when annoyed by them.
- Boogregard "Boog" Shlizetti (voiced by Jeff Bennett) is a short-tempered bully who likes to "bop" people and is obsessed with the video game Chimp Chomp (a parody of Donkey Kong). Boog's voice is a parody of John Travolta's character Vinnie Barbarino from Welcome Back, Kotter.
- Mr. Hank Mufflin (voiced by Jeff Bennett) is Fanboy and Chum Chum's grouchy yet often playful teacher.
- Yo (voiced by Dyana Liu) is another of Fanboy and Chum Chum's classmates. She is happy-go-lucky and loves her Yamaguchi (a parody of Tamagotchi) digital pets, especially Scampers, a cat Yamaguchi. She has a rather insane crush on Chum Chum, and often wants to play with him like he's a toy. Though she can be overly obsessive, she is normally nice.
- Lupe (voiced by Candi Milo) is a kind-spirited girl in Fanboy and Chum Chum's class. Lupe appears to be Yo's friend, and the two are often seen together.
- Dollar-nator (voiced by Jeff Bennett) is a Jamaican-accented artificial intelligence built by Fanboy in the future and sent back in time to bail the present-day Fanboy and Chum Chum out of a jam. He is a parody of the Terminator.
- Janitor Russ Poopatine (voiced by Steve Tompkins) is a janitor at Fanboy and Chum Chum's school. He is a parody of Emperor Palpatine from Star Wars. He is a pale, skinny, gnarled old man who wears a dark hooded shirt. Poopatine rides around in a sentient cart named Brenda. Brenda solely communicates in robotic noises, which Poopatine is capable of understanding.
- Man-Arctica (voiced by Jeff Bennett) is an ice-based superhero who scours the cosmos looking for scofflaws. Man-Arctica balances a mild disdain for humanity against his duty to save them from harm. Man-Arctica was asked to become president, but he declined due to the heavy responsibilities.
- Agent Johnson (voiced by Jeff Bennett) is the do-it-all authority figure in Galaxy Hills.
- Chris Chuggy (voiced by Eric Robles) is a classmate of Fanboy and Chum Chum's who communicates only by saying "Wah".
- Michael Johnson (voiced by Wyatt Cenac) is a classmate of Fanboy and Chum Chum's. His name and clothing is a parody of Michael Jackson as he is depicted as a good dancer and gets around by moonwalking.
- Duke (voiced by Jeff Bennett) is a classmate of Fanboy and Chum Chum's.
- Cher "Cheer" Leader is a cheerleader in Mr. Mufflin's class. She is a triplet and sometimes appears with her 2 other cheerleader sisters, who look exactly like her. The triplets were voiced by Kari Wahlgren in "Fanboy Stinks", but Cher is voiced by Candi Milo in all other appearances.
- Nancy Pancy (voiced by Kari Wahlgren; in "Fanboy A'hoy!" and "Slime Day", and by Nika Futterman) is a sweet and mature girl in Mr. Mufflin's class.
- Francine is a brown-haired diva in Mr. Mufflin's class. Voiced by Candi Milo.
- Cheech is a classmate in Mr. Mufflin's classroom. In "The Janitor Strikes Back" he was voiced by Nika Futterman.
- Fankylechum (voiced by Jamie Kennedy) is a nerdy, good-spirited classmate of the boys.
- Lunch Lady Cram (voiced by Candi Milo) is the new strict lunch lady who replaced the former strict lunch lady, Mildred. She is known for making glop.
- Ms. Harmounian (voiced by Estelle Harris) is a single mother committed to teaching her adult son, Oz, that the only way to run a successful business is by selling.
- Scrivener Elf (voiced by Jeff Bennett) is an elf Kyle creates in "The Janitor Strikes Back" to do his homework and other tasks, but he appears other times in the series as well.
- Necronomicon (voiced by Jeff Bennett) is a talking book of spells who is a companion to Kyle, and nags him about the moral implications of his choices.
- Sigmund The Sorcerer (voiced by Jeff Bennett) is Kyle's more successful and skillful German wizard rival from Kyle's former school for wizards, Milkweed Academy.
- Fedora Man (voiced by Jeff Bennett) is one of the delivery people in Galaxy Hills.
- Secret Shopper (voiced by Jeff Bennett) first appeared to evaluate Frosty Mart product quality and customer service in "Secret Shopper".
- Dirty Bird is a seagull who makes cameos throughout the show.
- Thorvald the Red (voiced by Nolan North) is a Viking hero who debuted first in "Norse-ing Around" and in "Norse Code" and in "The Last Strawberry Fun Finger" debuted last in "Normal Day".
- The Global Warmer (voiced by David Graham) is a supervillain and archenemy of Man-Arctica who appears several times in the series.
- Mitzi is Oz's mom's pet goat. She uses Mitzi to make milk, and in "The Hard Sell", she was to turn Oz's shop into a yogurt shop using yogurt created from Mitzi's milk. He is voiced by David Hornsby in "The Winners".
- Professor Flan (voiced by Jim Cummings) is a professor from Milkweed Academy whose permission Kyle has to grant to re-admit to Milkweed. He is the one who Kyle turned into a raspberry flan.
- Brizwald Harmounian (voiced by Amir Talai) is Oz's money-loving, scheming cousin.
- Chimp Chomp is a Donkey Kong parody video game featuring a monkey, Chimp Chomp, who is trying to take an ape's bananas. Boog is addicted to the video game. The game is playable on Nick.com.
- Precious (voiced by Dee Bradley Baker) is Mr. Mufflin's class pig. Precious appears in "Precious Pig" but a look-alike pig that could be Precious appeared in "Eyes on the Prize" and "Fanboy A'Hoy!"
- Berry (voiced by Kevin Michael Richardson) is a small pink creature who lives inside the Frosty Freezy Freeze machine at the Frosty Mart.
- The Ice Monster (voiced by Kevin Michael Richardson) is a frighteningly large beast created from the combination of Frosty Freezy Freeze and Ice-Monster Bun Bun, in the pilot episode from Random! Cartoons. It reappears in "Brain Freeze" when Blue-Tonium and Radioactive Red Frosty Freezy Freeze combine.
- Dr. Acula (voiced by Jeff Bennett) is a vampire plastic surgeon. He inadvertently transforms Fanboy into a vampire and attempts to have him bite Chum Chum to transform him as well, but is destroyed by sunlight.
- Miss Olive (voiced by Candi Milo) is a kindergarten teacher.
- Marsha (voiced by Candi Milo) was a sweet, successful student until Fanboy accidentally ruined her life by sneezing on her placement test, rendering it illegible. As a result, she received a failing grade and had to repeat kindergarten, causing her to swear revenge on Fanboy.
- Fanbot is a robotic version of Fanboy that appears in "I, Fanbot".
- Mecha-Tech (voiced by Dee Bradley Baker) is a dancing, robot action figure. Mecha-Tech often says, "I await your command!" and can do anything its owner tells it to do.
- Monster in the Mist (voiced by Jeff Bennett) is a figment of Boog's imagination.
- Scampers (voiced by Dee Bradley Baker) is Yo's cat Yamaguchi.
- Yum Yum (voiced by John DiMaggio) is a cycloptic bubblegum creature created by Fanboy and Chum Chum in "The Janitor Strikes Back".
- Fanman (voiced by Scott Grimes) is a superhero who appeared in the Random! Cartoons short "Fanboy".
- Sprinkles (voiced by Dee Bradley Baker) is the class bear.
- Muk Muk (voiced by Nika Futterman) is a female, semi-feral cousin of Chum Chum who hails from West Apetown.
- Crabulus: Destroyer of Worlds (voiced by Jeff Bennett) is a crab-like action figure. He appears several times in the series and is portrayed as being unpopular with collectors due to his embarrassing exercise DVD.
- Moppy is a mop that Fanboy assembled as a date for his school dance in "Moppy Dearest".
- Agent 08 is an octopus cartoon character of whom Fanboy and Chum Chum are big fans. Agent 08 is notorious for being made into a dangerous and explosive collectible toy which Oz owned and hid because it was supposed to be discontinued.
- The Burgle Brats (Murphy, Joey, and Molly) are three kindergartners with propensities for crime. (Murphy is voiced by Nika Futterman, Joey is voiced by Wyatt Cenac, and Molly is voiced by Candi Milo)
- Benjamin is a kindergartener in Miss Olive’s class. (Voiced by Nika Futterman)
- Patton is a black-haired kindergarten girl who has a couple of cameos in the show.
- Chestnut Brown-Haired Girl is a girl in kindergarten who has a couple of cameos in the show.
- Stinks is a dirt-based creature who takes over Fanboy's right glove and forces him to commit crimes.
- Nurse Lady Pam is a school nurse who is in love with Man-Arctica. Fanboy and Chum Chum fight for her attention in "Lice, Lice, Baby".

== Broadcast ==
A sneak preview of Fanboy & Chum Chum was aired in the United States on October 12, 2009. The official US debut of the series was November 6, 2009. In Canada, the series premiered on YTV on November 1, 2009, and on Nickelodeon on November 2, 2009. In the UK and Ireland, the series premiered on Nickelodeon April 2, 2010. The series debuted on Nickelodeon (Australia and New Zealand) April 19, 2010.. Nickelodeon in Sub-Saharan Africa began airing the series June 2010.

Fanboy & Chum Chum aired in reruns on Nicktoons from October 23, 2009, to December 25, 2016.

The entire series was added to Paramount+ (formerly CBS All Access) on December 15, 2020, and streamed for 4 years. It was removed on December 23, 2024 due to licensing agreements expiring.

== Home media ==
Paramount Home Entertainment is the DVD distributor for the series. These DVDs were released under the Nickelodeon label.

Fanboy & Chum Chum home video releases
Season		Episodes	Release dates		
Season		Episodes	Region 1	Region 2	Region 4
1	2009–10	52	SpongeBob SquarePants: Triton's Revenge: July 13, 2010; Episodes: "Wizboy" • "Pick a Nose" Fanboy & Chum Chum: May 24, 2011; Episodes: "Wizboy" – "The Janitor Strikes Back" • "Chimp Chomp Chumps" • "Fanboy in the Plastic Bubble" • "Freeze Tag" • "Fan vs. Wild" Brain Freeze: August 16, 2011; Episodes: "Berry Sick" • "Norse-ing Around" • "Refill Madness" • "The Frosty Bus" • "Jingle Fever" The Complete First Season (Amazon exclusive): August 7, 2012	SpongeBob SquarePants: Triton's Revenge: November 1, 2010; Episodes: "Wizboy" • "Pick a Nose" Fanboy & Chum Chum: May 28, 2012; Episodes: "Wizboy" – "The Janitor Strikes Back" • "Chimp Chomp Chumps" • "Fanboy in the Plastic Bubble" • "Freeze Tag" • "Fan vs. Wild" Brain Freeze: July 23, 2012; Episodes: "Back From The Future" • "Brain Freeze" SpongeBob SquarePants: The Great Sleigh Race: November 12, 2012; Episodes: "Trading Day" Comic Chaos: March 6, 2013; Episodes: "The Janitor's Apprentice" • "Marsha, Marsha, Marsha"	Comic Chaos: March 6, 2013; Episodes: "The Janitor's Apprentice" • "Marsha, Marsha, Marsha"
2	2011–12	48	Brain Freeze: August 16, 2011; Episodes: "Back from the Future" • "Brain Freeze" SpongeBob SquarePants: Frozen Face-Off: January 3, 2012; Episodes: "The Last Strawberry Fun Finger" • "Power Out"	Brain Freeze: July 23, 2012; Episodes: "Back from the Future" • "Brain Freeze" Comic Chaos: March 6, 2013; Episodes: "I'm Man-Arctica!" • "No Toy Story" • "GameBoy" • "Bubble Trouble" • "Lucky Chums"	Comic Chaos: March 6, 2013; Episodes: "I'm Man-Arctica!" • "No Toy Story" • "GameBoy" • "Bubble Trouble" • "Lucky Chums"
Special features
Fanboy & Chum Chum: Animated shorts Bonus episode: Planet Sheen: "The Pilot" Brain Freeze: "Brain Freeze" original animatic Comic Chaos: Bonus episode: SpongeBob SquarePants: "That Sinking Feeling"

=== Main ===
- Fanboy & Chum Chum (May 24, 2011, also includes the pilot episode of Planet Sheen)
- Fanboy & Chum Chum: Brain Freeze (August 16, 2011)
- Fanboy & Chum Chum: Season 1 (August 7, 2012)

=== Episodes on other DVDs ===
- SpongeBob SquarePants: Triton's Revenge (July 13, 2010, includes the episodes "Wizboy" and "Pick a Nose" on bonus features)
- SpongeBob SquarePants: SpongeBob's Frozen Face-Off (January 3, 2012, includes the episodes "The Last Strawberry Fun Finger" and "Power Out" on bonus features)

NOTE: The episode "A Very Brrr-y Icemas" along with Christmas episodes of The Fairly OddParents and T.U.F.F. Puppy were supposed to be on the It's a SpongeBob Christmas! DVD, but they were dropped from the actual release. However, the Target exclusive of It's A SpongeBob Christmas! included the Christmas episodes of those shows on a bonus disc.

== Reception and achievements ==
=== Reviews ===
Fanboy & Chum Chum received generally mixed reviews. Aaron H. Bynum of Animation Insider called Fanboy & Chum Chum "a fun show that deserves a good look. The quality animation helps counterbalance the immense amount of dialogue from the series' chatty characters, and the sheer comedy of marginally competent comic-loving kids helps outweigh what might otherwise be a binge of geeky annoyance. But overall, Fanboy & Chum Chum is a lot of fun." Variety praised the series' "bright, energetic look and even an appealing premise in theory". David Hinckley of NY Daily News gave the series three stars out of five, and said that "it's good [but] might not be the next SpongeBob".

Not all reviews were positive. KJ Dell'Antonia of Slate found the main characters irritating, and thought the whole concept was unoriginal, with "many tired jokes and not enough of that kind of mild satire to make this play in our house". Joly Herman of Common Sense Media gave the series 3 out of 5 stars; saying that:

If you're looking for deep content and lasting lessons, then this show isn't for you – or for your kids. Precious little of it can be applied to reality, especially when it comes to Fanboy and Chum Chum's experiences at school, where they enjoy nearly free rein to goof off and hardly put effort into their work. Even the nature of their friendship may be troubling to some parents, since Fanboy's control over his pal's actions sometimes verges on bullying. But there's no doubt that it's entertaining. So if your young tweens can check their sense of reality at the door, this silly show offers a fun depiction of the wild imagination that they probably share with the main characters. For younger kids, though, the blurry line between fiction and realistic lifestyles may be a little confusing.

In 2025, Comic Book Resources (CBR) included the networks's greenlighting of the series on its list of "10 Mistakes That Still Haunt Nickelodeon." According to CBR writer Rachel Ulatowski: "Today, some viewers and critics consider it Nickelodeon's worst cartoon. The show is loud, chaotic, overly reliant on toilet humor, and can be very irritating. Considering Nickelodeon allegedly rejected the now acclaimed show Adventure Time in favor of Fanboy and Chum Chum, its mediocrity is even more disappointing."

=== Ratings ===
The series premiered on November 6, 2009, after the SpongeBob SquarePants film Truth or Square. The broadcast ranked number three of cable programs that week and number two of the night. The premiere was watched by a total of 5.8 million viewers. The second episode was broadcast on November 7, 2009, and garnered 5.4 million viewers, ranking fifth of all cable broadcasts that week.

The third episode was broadcast a week later, on November 14, 2009, with 3.8 million viewers. A broadcast on November 28, 2009, was viewed by 3.9 million viewers. In February 2010, the episode "Moppy Dearest" was viewed by 4.27 million viewers, an improvement over the last few episodes.

A second season was announced on Nickelodeon's upfront of 2010–2011.

=== Awards ===
The series won a Daytime Emmy Award for Outstanding Special Class Animated Program at the 38th Daytime Emmy Awards.

Year	Award	Category	Nominee	Result
2010	Daytime Emmy Awards	Outstanding Individual in Animation	Steve Lambe (for "The Janitor Strikes Back")	Won
2010	Daytime Emmy Awards	Outstanding Individual in Animation	Caesar Martinez (for "Chimp Chomp Chumps")	Won
2010	Daytime Emmy Awards	Outstanding Directing in an Animated Program	Jim Schumann, Brian Sheesley and Ginny McSwain	Won
2010	Daytime Emmy Awards	Outstanding Achievement in Main Title Design	Eric Robles, Caesar Martinez, )Niki Yang, Dennis Shelby, Chad Woods, Steve Lambe, Michael Franceschi, Erik Kling and Shaun Cashman	Nominated
2011	Annie Awards	Best Animated Television Production for Children	Fanboy and Chum Chum	Nominated
2011	Annie Awards	Best Character Design in a Television Production	Steve Lambe	Nominated
2011	Annie Awards	Best Voice Acting in an Animated Television Production	Jeff Bennett For "The Necronomicon"	Nominated
2011	Daytime Emmy Awards	Outstanding Special Class Animated Program	Eric Robles, Steve Tompkins, Fred Seibert, Shaun Cashman, Jason Meier, Therese Trujillo, Dean Hoff and MacGregor Middleton	Won
2011	Daytime Emmy Awards	Outstanding Directing in an Animated Program	Brian Sheesley, Jim Schumann, Russell Calabrese and Ginny McSwain	Won
2011	Daytime Emmy Awards	Outstanding Casting for an Animated Series or Special	Meredith Layne	Nominated
2012	Annie Awards	Storyboarding in a Television Production	Joshua Nicolas	Nominated
2012	Annie Awards	Storyboarding in a Television Production	Katie Rice	Nominated
2012	Annie Awards	Best Animated Television Production - Children	Fanboy and Chum Chum	Nominated
2012	Daytime Emmy Awards	Outstanding Special Class Animated Program	Eric Robles, Steve Tompkins, Fred Seibert, Jason Meier and MacGregor Middleton	Nominated
2012	Motion Picture Sound Editors	Best Sound Editing - Sound Effects, Foley, Dialogue and ADR Animation in Television	For "A Very Brrr-y Icemas"	Nominated

== See also ==
- Adventure Time
- Random! Cartoons
