= Tower Prep =

- Genre: Action/Adventure; Mystery; Teen drama Science fiction Superhero
- Created by: Paul Dini
- Starring: Drew Van Acker; Ryan Pinkston; Elise Gatien; Dyana Liu
- Composers: Kristopher Carter; Michael McCuistion; Lolita Ritmanis
- Country of origin: United States
- Original language: English
- No. of seasons: 1
- No. of episodes: 13

Production
- Executive producers: Paul Dini; Glen Morgan; Bill O'Dowd; Brian A. Miller (Note: executive producer for Cartoon Network Studios); Mark Costa; Tramm Wigzell; Rob Swartz; Rob Sorcher
- Producers: Peter Lhotka; Karen Mayeda-Vranek (Note: co-producer); Darin Morgan (Note: supervising producer)
- Production locations: Vancouver, British Columbia, Canada
- Cinematography: Philip Linzey
- Editors: Scott Richter; Geoffrey O'Brien; James Coblentz
- Camera setup: Film; Single-camera
- Running time: 45 minutes
- Production companies: Dolphin Entertainment; Cartoon Network Studios

Original release
- Network: Cartoon Network
- Release: October 12 – December 28, 2010

Tower Prep is an American teen science-fiction television series created for Cartoon Network by Paul Dini, who is known for previously writing and producing series in the DC Animated Universe. From October 12 to December 28, 2010, the series aired one thirteen-episode season, before being canceled by Cartoon Network.

== Premise ==
The series centers around "Tower Prep", an isolated boarding school for teenagers with supernatural abilities. The protagonist (Ian Archer) and a group of friends (Gabe Forrest, Suki Sato, and CJ Ward) are unwilling students at the institution, with no memory of how they got there. Throughout the series, they explore the mysteries of Tower Prep in the hope of escaping and returning to their normal lives.

== Characters ==
The cast of Tower Prep (from left to right): Drew Van Acker as Ian Archer, Dyana Liu as Suki Sato, Ryan Pinkston as Gabe Forrest, and Elise Gatien as CJ Ward.

=== Main ===
- Drew Van Acker as Ian Archer, has the ability of "preflex", seeing and reacting to events before they occur.
- Elise Gatien as Candice "CJ" Ward, has the ability of "perception", which allows her read people's intentions from their body language.
- Ryan Pinkston as Gabriel "Gabe" Lexington Forrest, has the ability of "hypersuasion", which allows him talk people into doing whatever he wants.
- Dyana Liu as Suki Sato, has the ability of "mimicry", which allows her perfectly replicate any sound she has ever heard.

=== Tower Prep staff ===
- Ted Whittall as Headmaster, the mysterious head of Tower Prep, eventually revealed to be CJ's father.
- Dan Payne as Coach, a former student of Tower Prep and a test subject for Corvus H-40, a performance-enhancing substance.
- Alek Diakun as Dr. Specs, a doctor responsible for "wiping" the memories of new students.
- Richard Steinmetz as Coach History.
- Karin Konoval as Nurse.

=== Supporting ===
- Peggy Jo Jacobs as the voice of Whisper 119, the artificial intelligence responsible for managing the school and contacting new students. Later upgraded to Whisper 120.
- Richard Harmon as Ray Snider, a student with the ability of "Hyper-strength".
- Izaak Smith as Calvin "Cal" Rice, a jock with the ability of enhanced hearing who bullies Ian.
- Andrew Dunbar as Conner Owens, a member of a secret group who assists Ian and his friends.
- David Smith and Matthew Thiessen as Cornelius Augustus Tower, a former magician, WWI fighter pilot, and jazz artist, who founded Tower Prep.
- Charlie Carrick as Fenton Capwell, an opera-loving student.
- Jodi Balfour as Emily Wright, the former class president of Tower Prep.

=== Minor ===
- Calum Worthy as Don Finch, Ray Snider's best friend.
- Terry Chen as Shinji Sato, Suki Sato's older brother.
- Jeffery Ballard as Emerson Poencet, a student with the ability of microscopic vision.
- Jarod Joseph as Howard Gilmore, a student with the ability to see in the dark.
- Kacey Rohl as Ross Anderson, Emily's ruthless campaign manager.

== Production ==
Paul Dini wrote the first episode of Tower Prep, drawing on his own experiences of "strangeness" and "alienation" at prep school. Cartoon Network picked up the series as part of their initiative to develop live action programming for a family audience. The pilot was shot in 2009, and full production of the first season began in 2010 in Vancouver, British Columbia. Former X-Files writer Glen Morgan was hired as executive producer and showrunner, joined by a writing team including Dini, Glen's brother Darin Morgan, Riley Stearns, Aury Wallington, Jeff Eckerle, and Marilyn Osborn.

The promotion for the series began with a fictional storyline, in which Cartoon Network published vlogs from the four main characters. Prior to the series premiere, a sneak peek of the show was released for free download on the iTunes Store featuring half of the first episode. To promote the premiere, the network announced a giveaway of 1,000 iPod Touch devices that would take place during the show. The song "Unstoppable" by Foxy Shazam was used in network promos and in the episode "Trust".

== Cancellation ==
The last two episodes of the first season aired on December 28, 2010. On March 23, 2011, Cartoon Network announced their new and returning programs for the remainder of 2011 and Tower Prep was not mentioned as one of the returning series. In October 2011, Cartoon Network removed all Tower Prep content from its website.

In December 2011, Paul Dini announced that the series would not return for a second season. Dini continued to comment on the series over the next several years, saying that he was "sworn to secrecy" about the ending, that Cartoon Network decided not to air a second season despite talk of foreign financing, and that he was never given a reason for the cancellation of the series. Dini speculated that a primary reason for the cancellation was that Tower Prep drew a primarily female viewership, and that Cartoon Network wanted to instead target young male viewers for their merchandising.

== Episodes ==
No.	Title	Directed by	Written by	Original release date	US viewers (millions)
1	"New Kid"	Terry McDonough	Paul Dini	October 12, 2010	1.323
Ian Archer (Drew Van Acker) is suspended for fighting while defending another student. That night, he loses consciousness and wakes up at a mysterious school called Tower Prep. In the process of attempting to escape, he joins forces with fellow students CJ Ward (Elise Gatien), Gabe Forrest (Ryan Pinkston) and Suki Sato (Dyana Liu). The group's plans are thwarted by "gnomes", creatures living in the forest around Tower Prep.
2	"Monitored"	Thomas Wright	Paul Dini	October 19, 2010	1.061
Ian must defend himself against accusations of theft in a school tribunal, while Gabe, CJ, and Suki work to prove his innocence. Ian discovers a secret tunnel entrance in his room, which Howard Gilmore, Gabe's roommate, was using to frame him for the thefts.
3	"Whisper"	James Wong	Glen Morgan	October 26, 2010	0.881
Ian, Gabe, CJ, and Suki attempt to track down the author of a mysterious note. In the process, they encounter Whisper 23, an older version of the school AI, who forces them to play a deadly video game.
4	"Buffer"	Peter DeLuise	Glen Morgan	November 2, 2010	0.903
Ian sacrifices a chance to join the school sports team in order to help his friends investigate Coach History's connection with the mysterious "gnomes", who turn out to be Tower Prep students.
5	"The Rooks"	Thomas Wright	Aury Wallington	November 9, 2010	1.065
Ian joins a school fraternity called the Rooks, only to betray them when he discovers their plans to sabotage CJ's dance.
6	"Book Report"	Peter DeLuise	Darin Morgan	November 16, 2010	1.018
While reading the Odyssey, Ian discovers notes about how to escape Tower Prep, written by a former student named Norman.
7	"Election"	Michael Rohl	Riley Stearns	November 23, 2010	0.978
As Gabe runs against Emily Wright for class president, students begin to lose their powers. Ian discovers that Ross Anderson, Emily's campaign manager, has been using the campaign buttons to infect the students.
8	"Field Trip"	Dwight Little	Paul Dini	November 30, 2010	0.986
During a Biology field trip into the woods, Ian and Cal discover an underground gnome lair. They meet Philips, or "Redfang", leader of a mysterious group dedicated to saving students from becoming gnomes.
9	"Dreams"	Brenton Spencer	Darin Morgan	December 7, 2010	0.901
When Ian, Gabe, and Suki have dreams about a mysterious yellow elevator, they search for it in the tunnels. They observe a new student (Conner) being brought out of the elevator. Conner, who becomes Ian and Gabe's new roommate, can infiltrate dreams. The group investigates the office of Cornelius Tower, founder of Tower Prep. Conner escapes the school.
10	"Phone Home"	Michael Robison	Aury Wallington	December 14, 2010	0.982
Ian attempts to call home for his birthday. Suki discovers that her brother, Shinji, is still alive.
11	"Trust"	Michael Rohl	Riley Stearns	December 21, 2010	1.068
Ian suspects CJ of feeding Cal information for Headmaster about the group's escape plan. Emily Wright plans to join the Broken, a resistance group.
12	"Snitch"	Thomas Wright	Jeff Eckerle and Marilyn Osborn	December 28, 2010	N/A
Conner returns to the school to help the group escape. Ian investigates West Campus and finds a way out. Headmaster is revealed to be CJ's father.
13	"Fathers"	Dwight Little	Glen Morgan	December 28, 2010	N/A
Gabe is sent to West Campus. Ian rescues Suki from her father, and defeats Headmaster in a fight. The group rescue Gabe and escape through a vent Ian found in West Campus, before meeting a hologram of Whisper 120.

== Reception ==
Critics commented on the show's low production values and murky fight scenes, but praised its overall concept, writing, and cast. Brian Lowry of Variety said the show's mysteries might appeal to both children and adults, calling it "a series that points the way toward a best-case scenario" for Cartoon Network's live-action programming.

In the 2011 Leo Awards, Brenton Spencer was nominated for Best Direction in a Youth or Children's Program or Series for the episode "Dreams".
