= List of Fanboy & Chum Chum episodes =

This is a list of episodes of the Nickelodeon animated television series Fanboy & Chum Chum.

== Series overview ==
Season	Episodes	Originally released	
Season	Episodes	First released	Last released
Pilot		August 14, 2007	
1	52	October 12, 2009	November 4, 2010
2	48	April 25, 2011	July 12, 2014

== Episodes ==
=== Pilot (2007) ===
Title	Directed by	Written by	Storyboard by	Original release date	Prod. code
"Fanboy"	Shaun Cashman	Eric Robles	Andy Kelly & Eric Robles	August 14, 2007	100
Two kids in superhero costumes purchase their favorite drink and end up creating an ice monster.

=== Season 1 (2009–10) ===
The first season comprises 26 half-hour episodes with two short-length segments in per episode.

No. overall	No. in season	Title	Directed by	Written by	Storyboard by	Original release date	Prod. code	U.S. viewers (millions)
1a	1a	"Dollar Day"	Brian Sheesley	Steve Tompkins	Eddie Trigueros	October 12, 2009	101b	N/A
While on a visit to the Frosty Mart, Chum Chum winds up spending his and Fanboy's only dollar on the Chimp Chomp game, leaving them broke. They constantly insist help from anyone who walks through the door in lending them a dollar so they can escape. Note: This episode first aired as a sneak peek of the series on October 12, 2009. The official premiere of the series was November 6, 2009.
1b	1b	"Wizboy"	Jim Schumann	Steve Tompkins	Andy Kelly	November 6, 2009	101a	5.78
The boys think Kyle (the new kid) is a pretend wizard. But, the boys soon learn that their new friend is an actual wizard expelled from a wizard school called Milkweed Academy.
2a	2a	"Trading Day"	Brian Sheesley	Scott Kreamer	Niki Yang	November 6, 2009	103a	5.78
Fanboy trades Chum Chum for Yo's Mecha-Tech robot. Soon, he starts to miss his best friend when playing with the Mecha-Tech.
2b	2b	"The Janitor Strikes Back"	Jim Schumann	Eric Horsted	Lane Lueras	November 7, 2009	102b	5.42
Fanboy and Chum Chum are disappointed when Janitor Poopatine bans gum from the school, because their favorite wad of chewed-up gum, Yum Yum, came to life and decided to go to school with the boys.
3a	3a	"Digital Pet Cemetery"	Jim Schumann	Scott Kreamer	Andy Kelly	November 7, 2009	104b	5.42
After they accidentally "power down" Yo's digital pet cat Scampers, Fanboy and Chum Chum bury it at the graveyard, only to make it come back as an evil, malicious zombie.
3b	3b	"I, Fanbot"	Brian Sheesley	Eric Horsted	Tom King	November 14, 2009	105a	3.79
Fanboy and Chum Chum have a test coming up and if the entire class passes, they win a bouncy house. Fanboy decides to install his brain into Oz's robot to get smarter, but worse results come to follow.
4a	4a	"Berry Sick"	Jim Schumann	Scott Kreamer	Lane Lueras	November 14, 2009	105b	3.79
When a heatwave hits Galaxy Hills, the boys see the Frosty Freezy Freeze machine is on the fritz. They try to nurse Berry, the ice monster who runs the machine, back to health, but wind up ultimately getting "Frosty Freezy Freeze Fever" the moment they lick him.
4b	4b	"Fangboy"	Jim Schumann	Scott Kreamer	Howie Perry	November 21, 2009	110a	N/A
Fanboy suspects he's been bitten by a vampire, and the boys go see a neck specialist who turns out to be a vampire himself.
5a	5a	"Monster in the Mist"	Jim Schumann	Eric Horsted	Howie Perry	November 21, 2009	106b	N/A
Boog believes he saw a ferocious monster in the Frosty Mart, and Fanboy and Chum Chum help him catch it.
5b	5b	"Chimp Chomp Chumps"	Brian Sheesley	Eric Horsted	Eddie Trigueros	November 28, 2009	107a	3.90
Boog will do anything for the boys if he wants to get one of their 3 tickets to see a Chimp Chomp movie.
6a	6a	"Precious Pig"	Brian Sheesley	Eric Horsted	Niki Yang	November 28, 2009	106a	3.90
Fanboy and Chum Chum take home and care for the class pet Tamworth pig, Precious. But Mr. Mufflin catches Fanboy teaching him kung fu and thinks he's hurting him, so he takes Precious back and Fanboy can no longer care for him due to Mufflin's cruelty.
6b	6b	"Excuse Me"	Jim Schumann	Scott Kreamer	Lane Lueras	December 5, 2009	111b	N/A
Fanboy, Chum Chum and Kyle get Kyle's Scrivener Elf to write fake excuse notes to get out of various classes.
7a	7a	"Night Morning"	Brian Sheesley	Eric Horsted	Niki Yang	December 5, 2009	112b	N/A
Chum Chum shows Fanboy a time of day called Night-Morning, where he wakes up at midnight and performs morning activities. Fanboy invites the whole class over to party, but it doesn't seem as fun to them as it is to Fanboy and Chum Chum.
7b	7b	"Norse-ing Around"	Russell Calabrese	Steve Tompkins and Michael Caine	Tom King	January 2, 2010	109a	N/A
Fanboy and Chum Chum meet a Viking named Thorvald the Red Hero, who was frozen in their giant ice pop. When Thorvald wants to go to Valhalla, Fanboy and Chum Chum try to bring him there.
8a	8a	"The Janitor's Apprentice"	Jim Schumann	Steve Tompkins and Michael Caine	Howie Perry	January 2, 2010	113a	N/A
When Fanboy and Chum Chum are once again punished for making a mess in the cafeteria, they have to help Janitor Poopatine clean up the school.
8b	8b	"Fanboy Stinks"	Jim Schumann	Eric Horsted	Howie Perry	January 16, 2010	103b	N/A
Fanboy refuses to bathe for a not bathing record, but his right hand on his super-suit comes to life and threatens to rob the school's charity bake sale.
9a	9a	"The Hard Sell"	Brian Sheesley	Steve Tompkins	Eddie Trigueros	January 16, 2010	104a	N/A
Fanboy and Chum Chum try to convince Oz to sell something so he doesn't lose his store to his mom, who plans on turning the store into a frozen yogurt shop.
9b	9b	"Fanboyfriend"	Russell Calabrese	Itai Grunfeld	Octavio Rodriguez	February 6, 2010	110b	4.27
Lupe falls in love with Fanboy after he saves her from a brown recluse spider. Problems arise when she won't stop pestering Fanboy once love-struck.
10a	10a	"Moppy Dearest"	Brian Sheesley	Michael Caine	Todd Waterman	February 6, 2010	115b	4.27
Fanboy assembles a mop girlfriend as a date for his school dance. However, when Chum Chum's date, his cousin from West Apetown, arrives at the dance as well, Fanboy falls for her.
10b	10b	"Prank Master"	Russell Calabrese	Scott Kreamer	Octavio Rodriguez	February 15, 2010	113b	N/A
Prank Day arrives and the boys can't wait to show off their skills. But when Yo can't stop pranking Fanboy, the boys are forced to enlist Boog to help them prank her back.
11a	11a	"Little Glop of Horrors"	Russell Calabrese	Eric Horsted	Tom King	February 15, 2010	112a	N/A
The kids are grossed out when the new lunch lady serves only disgusting, red glop and won't let them leave until they finish eating it. So, everyone tries to escape the cafeteria.
11b	11b	"Total Recall"	Brian Sheesley	Itai Grunfeld	Eddie Trigueros	February 27, 2010	111a	3.71
The boys are desperate to keep a recalled toy of their favorite octopus cartoon character named Agent 08.
12a	12a	"Refill Madness"	Brian Sheesley	Eric Horsted	Niki Yang	February 27, 2010	114a	3.71
Lenny and Boog plot to steal Fanboy and Chum Chum's special cup that gives them unlimited free refills.
12b	12b	"Marsha, Marsha, Marsha"	Jim Schumann	Scott Kreamer	Octavio Rodriguez	March 13, 2010	107b	3.70
The boys wind up in the wrong playground and are mistaken for kindergarteners. While there, they encounter Marsha, Fanboy's archenemy seeking revenge on the time Fanboy sneezed on her test.
13a	13a	"Secret Shopper"	Jim Schumann	Eric Horsted	Lane Lueras	March 13, 2010	108b	3.70
Boog and Lenny are away, and the boys learn to take care of business when a Secret Shopper comes to the Frosty Mart.
13b	13b	"Chicken Pox"	Brian Sheesley	Scott Kreamer	Tom King	March 29, 2010	108a	N/A
Kyle transforms into a hen after getting the chicken pox, so the boys try to get him to turn back to normal by getting him to lay an egg, but end up causing problems.
14a	14a	"The Frosty Bus"	Russell Calabrese	Scott Kreamer	Tom King	March 30, 2010	115a	N/A
The boys want to buy a Frosty Freezy Freeze from the Frosty Mart's new bus, but Boog won't let them. So, they try to find a way to get their treats without getting bopped.
14b	14b	"Cold War"	Jim Schumann	Scott Kreamer	Howie Perry	March 31, 2010	116a	N/A
The boys are under the weather, and when they wind up fighting each other, they also fight over Kyle's attention when he comes to visit them.
15a	15a	"Pick a Nose"	Brian Sheesley	Steve Tompkins	Tom King	April 1, 2010	102a	N/A
The boys switch noses for class picture day, but rivalry is just around the corner.
15b	15b	"Fanboy in the Plastic Bubble"	Brian Sheesley	Scott Kreamer	Niki Yang	April 2, 2010	120a	N/A
Fanboy and Chum Chum buy Boog's plastic bubble from a yard sale, but Boog gets outraged when he discovers it makes the riders bop-proof.
16a	16a	"Saving Private Chum Chum"	Brian Sheesley	Eric Horsted and Scott Kreamer	Todd Waterman	May 15, 2010	121b	N/A
Mr. Mufflin takes away everyone's toys in class. When he mistakes Chum Chum, who swallowed a squeaky ball, for a toy, Fanboy gets his friends together to retrieve Chum Chum overnight.
16b	16b	"Norse Code"	Russell Calabrese	Michael Caine	Tom King	May 15, 2010	121a	N/A
Thorvald visits Fanboy and Chum Chum and they help him get his battle axe back from the lunch lady.
17a	17a	"The Incredible Shrinking Fanboy"	Russell Calabrese	Stephen Sustarsic	Octavio Rodriguez and Kataneh Vahdani	June 7, 2010	119b	N/A
Fanboy is convinced that he's shrinking after his height-measuring flower grows overnight, and Oz uses a giant ruler that measures Fanboy as being only two inches tall. So, Fanboy "moves into" Yo's dollhouse.
17b	17b	"Strings Attached"	Jim Schumann	Eric Horsted	Lane Lueras	June 8, 2010	117b	N/A
Fanboy is turned into a puppet and tries to prove himself worthy by doing a good deed, but it doesn't go well.
18a	18a	"The Tell-Tale Toy"	Jim Schumann	Eric Horsted and Scott Kreamer	Lane Lueras	June 9, 2010	120b	N/A
While Chum Chum leaves Fanboy by himself to care for his new Ultra-Ninja, Fanboy accidentally breaks it, and tries not to let Chum Chum know about it.
18b	18b	"Fan-bidextrous"	Jim Schumann	Eric Horsted	Howie Perry	June 10, 2010	122a	N/A
When Fanboy discovers he has two arms, he realizes that with two arms, he can be a better class clown.
19a	19a	"Brain Drain"	Brian Sheesley	Scott Kreamer	Niki Yang	June 11, 2010	109b	N/A
Fanboy's brain falls out of his head and Chum Chum replaces it with a sponge. Unfortunately, Fanboy still can't remember a thing, causing Chum Chum to become an open target for Yo.
19b	19b	"A Bopwork Orange"	Jim Schumann	Eric Horsted	Howie Perry	June 19, 2010	124b	N/A
The boys teach Boog how to stop bopping so he can stay at the Frosty Mart.
20a	20a	"The Great Bicycle Mystery"	Russell Calabrese and Shaun Cashman	Eric Horsted and Scott Kreamer	Alex Almaguer	June 19, 2010	125b	N/A
When Lenny's bike gets destroyed outside the Frosty Mart by an unknown person, Fanboy and Chum Chum try to determine who did it.
20b	20b	"Sigmund the Sorcerer"	Brian Sheesley	Eric Horsted	Niki Yang and Eddie Trigueros	September 11, 2010	117a	N/A
Kyle is not pleased when his old rival, Sigmund the Sorcerer, shows up in Galaxy Hills. And when Sigmund comes over to his place for dinner, Kyle tries to pass Fanboy and Chum Chum off as his elf assistants.
21a	21a	"Fanboy A'Hoy!"	Russell Calabrese	Scott Kreamer	Tom King	September 11, 2010	118a	N/A
While playing pirates, the boys accidentally bury the map with the treasure, so they get the whole class together to help find it.
21b	21b	"Freeze Tag"	Brian Sheesley	Michael Caine	Eddie Trigueros	September 18, 2010	126a	N/A
Man-Arctica takes a game of freeze tag up to a new level by freezing everybody, so Fanboy and Chum Chum do their best not to get frozen.
22a	22a	"Jingle Fever"	Jim Schumann	Eric Horsted and Scott Kreamer	Lane Lueras	September 18, 2010	126b	N/A
Lenny tries to ruin Fanboy and Chum Chum's chances of winning a million Frosty Bucks by stopping them from writing a jingle for the Frosty Mart.
22b	22b	"Lord of the Rings"	Brian Sheesley	Scott Kreamer	Niki Yang	October 2, 2010	123a	N/A
Fanboy puts on a magic show and does a connecting ring trick, which Kyle is impressed by because he, being a wizard, can't even do the trick. So Kyle tries to find out the secret to the ring trick.
23a	23a	"The Incredible Chulk"	Jim Schumann	Eric Horsted	Lane Lueras	October 2, 2010	123b	N/A
Fanboy makes Chum Chum laugh so hard, that he grows into a humongous, orange Chulk. Fanboy thinks that "Chulked-out" Chum Chum can bop Boog with his giant fists. But when Chum Chum shrinks to normal size due to Boog scaring him, Fanboy tries to make him grow again.
23b	23b	"Eyes on the Prize"	Russell Calabrese	Michael Caine	Tom King	October 9, 2010	124a	N/A
The boys have no luck while searching for a Man-Arctica cereal box toy that's in limited condition, so they seek help from Oz. Unfortunately Oz turns out to be searching for the same prize.
24a	24a	"Battle of the Stands"	Brian Sheesley	Scott Kreamer	Todd Waterman	October 9, 2010	125a	N/A
The boys start a lemonade stand, but Lupe and Yo start a competing one across the street.
24b	24b	"The Book Report of the Dead"	Jim Schumann	Scott Kreamer	Howie Perry	October 23, 2010	119a	N/A
Fanboy swipes Kyle's spellbook to finish his book report, but ends up turning Mr. Mufflin into a zombie.
25a	25a	"Separation Anxiety"	Russell Calabrese	Scott Kreamer	Octavio Rodriguez	November 1, 2010	116b	N/A
The boys' desks are separated for singing out loud during "Quiet Time", so they try to get reunited.
25b	25b	"Fan vs. Wild"	Jim Schumann	Itai Grunfeld	Lane Lueras	November 2, 2010	114b	N/A
Fanboy, Chum Chum and Kyle go camping on the Frosty Mart roof, but Kyle accidentally drops the rope to get down, forcing the boys to try and survive in the roof's bitter, cold, frosty weather.
26a	26a	"Man-Arctica the Ride"	Russell Calabrese	Steve Tompkins and Michael Caine	Eric Robles and Lane Lueras	November 3, 2010	122b	N/A
Fanboy and Chum Chum are eager to ride a new roller coaster, but Fanboy's excitement later turns into fear.
26b	26b	"Stan Arctica"	Brian Sheesley	Michael Caine	Todd Waterman	November 4, 2010	118b	N/A
Man-Arctica poses as a storeworker named Stan at Oz's when Fanboy and Chum Chum believe that he disappeared forever.

=== Season 2 (2011–14) ===
On March 12, 2010, the series was picked up for a second season of 26 episodes. The writers of the series said they started writing season two on February 1, 2010. The season first aired on April 25, 2011, with the episode segments "I'm Man-Arctica!" and "No Toy Story". Nickelodeon aired episodes from this season sporadically until December 10, 2011. The episode segments "Robo-mance" and "Rattleskunkupine!" aired on February 11, 2012, after a 2-month hiatus. Many months later, between October 15, 2012, and November 2, 2012, Nickelodeon aired a total of 29 new Fanboy & Chum Chum episode segments from season 2. No third season was announced at Nickelodeon's upfront for the 2013–14 season. One episode segment, "Brain Freeze", was not broadcast until July 12, 2014, but was released to DVD on August 16, 2011.

No. overall	No. in season	Title	Directed by	Written by	Storyboard by	Original release date	Prod. code	Viewers (millions)
27a	1a	"I'm Man-Arctica!"	Tom King	Michael Caine	Alex Almaguer	April 25, 2011	201a	N/A
Man-Arctica tries to prove who he is when Fanboy and Chum Chum refuse to believe him.
27b	1b	"No Toy Story"	Eddie Trigueros	Steve Tompkins	Justin Nichols	April 25, 2011	201b	N/A
When Fanboy and Chum Chum unknowingly get baby toys in the mail, they soon believe that all their toys are for babies when an actual baby wants to play with all their toys. Soon, they vow to never play with toys again.
28a	2a	"Present Not Accounted For"	Brandon Kruse	Russ Carney & Ron Corcillo	Matt Whitlock	April 26, 2011	205a	N/A
Fanboy forgets Chum Chum's birthday, and desperately scrambles to find a gift for him.
28b	2b	"The Sword in the Throne"	Brandon Kruse	Russ Carney & Ron Corcillo	Vaughn Tada	April 26, 2011	206b	N/A
When Fanboy learns that he is the king of the janitors, Janitor Poopatine is forced to tutor him by the Custodial Council.
29a	3a	"Schoolhouse Lock"	Brandon Kruse	Jonathan Corban Butler	Vaughn Tada	April 27, 2011	203a	N/A
The boys get locked in the school right before summer vacation.
29b	3b	"Back From the Future"	Tom King	Steve Tompkins and Michael Caine	James Burks	April 27, 2011	203b	N/A
Lenny goes back in time to stop the boys from having their first Frosty Freezy Freeze.
30a	4a	"GameBoy"	Brandon Kruse	Russ Carney & Ron Corcillo	Ed Baker	April 28, 2011	202a	N/A
After the boys accidentally release the monkey from Boog's favorite video game, Chum Chum sneaks into the machine and pretends to be Chimp Chomp so that Boog doesn't find out.
30b	4b	"The Big Bopper"	Tom King	Russ Carney & Ron Corcillo	Alex Almaguer	April 28, 2011	204b	N/A
Boog must learn how to be a "boppee", one who gets bopped, after being bopped countless times by Lemuel, the meanest and newest Frosty Mart employee.
31a	5a	"Crib Notes"	Eddie Trigueros	Steve Tompkins and Michael Caine	David Gemmill	August 27, 2011	202b	N/A
Kyle's scheme to cheat his way back into Milkweed backfires when his spell for "crib notes" turns him into a baby.
31b	5b	"HypnotOZed"	Tom King	Steve Tompkins	Brian Hatfield	August 27, 2011	212a	N/A
When Oz's new, vintage "Boom Bot" toy hypnotizes him into selling items whenever the doorbell to his shop rings, he ends up selling all of his collector's items.
32a	6a	"Risky Brizness"	Eddie Trigueros	Michael Caine	David Gemmill	August 27, 2011	208b	N/A
When Oz's cousin, Brizwald, comes to town, Oz is certain he is after his most valuable Man-Arctica comic book.
32b	6b	"Kids in the Hall"	Brandon Kruse	Jonathan Corban Butler	Matt Whitlock	August 27, 2011	208a	N/A
Hall monitors Fanboy and Chum Chum complicate Kyle's attempt to get back into Milkweed Academy.
33a	7a	"The Last Strawberry Fun Finger"	Brandon Kruse	Russ Carney & Ron Corcillo	Matt Whitlock	October 1, 2011	214a	N/A
The boys find a third Strawberry Fun Finger in their usual two-pack and desperately try to decide who gets to eat it.
33a	7b	"Power Out"	Ken Mitchroney	Michael Caine, Russ Carney & Ron Corcillo, Steve Tompkins	David Gemmill	October 1, 2011	214b	N/A
The boys cause a town-wide blackout when they settle in to watch a movie called Robot Pirate Ninja President from the future.
34	8	"There Will Be Shrieks"	Tom King	Steve Tompkins and Michael Caine	James Burks and Katie Rice	October 23, 2011	209 210	N/A
When Fanboy and Chum Chum lose their taste sense to a Halloween spirit, Mr. Trick, they try to bring him 1,000 screams in order to get it back. Note: This is the first half-hour special to air.
35	9	"A Very Brrr-y Icemas"	Brandon Kruse	Michael Caine, Russ Carney & Ron Corcillo, Steve Tompkins	Vaughn Tada and Matt Whitlock	December 10, 2011	217 218	N/A
After Fanboy winds up on Man-Arctica's Naughty List, the boys infiltrate the Igloo of Isolation to try to get him back onto the Good List in time for Icemas. Note: This is the second half-hour special to air.
36a	10a	"Robo-mance"	Brandon Kruse	Michael Cane	Vaughn Tada	February 11, 2012	212b	N/A
Fanboy and Chum Chum play cupids when Dollar-nator falls in love with Oz's new robot librarian, Julie Android.
36b	10b	"Rattleskunkupine!"	Ken Mitchroney	Steve Tompkins	David Gemmill	February 11, 2012	211b	N/A
The boys find a new pet that's a cross between a Texan rattlesnake, a skunk, and a North American porcupine. This animal is called the "rattleskunkupine", but Fanboy and Chum Chum name it "Scooter". They have to hide it from Oz when they learn that it's terrorizing the city.
37a	11a	"Heroes vs. Villains"	Tom King	Michael Caine, Russ Carney & Ron Corcillo, Steve Tompkins	Scott Bern and Katie Rice	October 15, 2012	221a	0.86
After reading a captivating comic book, the boys don't agree on whether heroes are better than villains, or if villains are better than heroes. They continue their debate as Super Chum and Fannihilator.
37b	11b	"Face-Eating Aliens From Planet X"	Brandon Kruse	Michael Caine, Russ Carney & Ron Corcillo, Steve Tompkins	Vaughn Tada	October 15, 2012	221b	0.86
The boys dress up like girls to infiltrate Yo's slumber party to prove that she and her girlfriends are face-eating aliens from Planet X.
38a	12a	"Lice Lice Baby"	Ken Mitchroney	Michael Caine, Russ Carney & Ron Corcillo, Steve Tompkins	Kyle A. Carrozza	October 16, 2012	216a	1.06
The boys develop a crush on Nurse Lady Pam on Lice Inspection Day, and soon both fight over her affection.
38b	12b	"Get You Next Time"	Tom King	Michael Caine, Russ Carney & Ron Corcillo, Steve Tompkins	Katie Rice	October 16, 2012	216b	1.06
After Retchy Lintpockets spots Fanboy a piece of taffy on credit, Fanboy promises to get him next time. But instead, Retchy promises to "get" Fanboy next time, in this Raimi-esque tale of suspense!
39a	13a	"Attack of the Clones"	Brandon Kruse	Michael Caine, Russ Carney & Ron Corcillo, Steve Tompkins	Matt Whitlock	October 17, 2012	226a	0.82
The boys create clones of themselves so they can go on a field trip to the thermometer factory. But the inattentive clones create more clones, and the town is quickly overrun by highly unstable, zombie-like Cloneboys and Chum Clones.
39b	13b	"Secret Club"	Ken Mitchroney	Michael Caine, Russ Carney & Ron Corcillo, Steve Tompkins	David Gemmill	October 17, 2012	226b	0.82
Fanboy and Chum Chum learn about a secret club in Galaxy Hills and do whatever they can to locate it.
40a	14a	"The Cold Rush"	Ken Mitchroney	Michael Caine, Russ Carney & Ron Corcillo, Steve Tompkins	Ken Mitchroney, Ray Morelli, Eddie Trigueros	October 18, 2012	222a	0.92
Faniel and Chumtholemew are two 1800s wild west prospectors on the hunt for the fabled Frosty Freezy Freeze.
40b	14b	"Camp-Arctica"	Tom King	Michael Caine, Russ Carney & Ron Corcillo, Steve Tompkins	Katie Rice	October 18, 2012	222b	0.92
The boys win an opportunity to hang out with Man-Arctica at his insufferably cold summer camp, only to discover an easy escape at Global Warmer's summer camp.
41a	15a	"Frosty Mart Dream Vacation"	Brandon Kruse	Russ Carney & Ron Corcillo	Vaughn Tada	October 19, 2012	209a	0.87
Fanboy and Chum Chum win a "dream vacation" and believe that means they can take it at the Frosty Mart.
41b	15b	"Field Trip of Horrors"	Ken Mitchroney	Russ Carney & Ron Corcillo	Robb Pratt	October 19, 2012	209b	0.87
Fanboy and Chum Chum try to derail a field trip to the horrible Glop Mines, where they've heard that a kid-eating glop monster lives.
42a	16a	"Funny Face"	Tom King	Michael Caine, Russ Carney & Ron Corcillo, Steve Tompkins	Katie Rice	October 22, 2012	220a	0.95
After Fanboy creates the perfect goofy face, he is determined to use it to make the class photo hilarious.
42b	16b	"Put That Cookie Down!"	Ken Mitchroney	Michael Caine, Russ Carney & Ron Corcillo, Steve Tompkins	David Gemmill	October 22, 2012	218a	0.95
Lenny bakes Chocolatonium chip cookies for Agent Johnson's birthday and orders Dollar-nator to keep them away from Fanboy and Chum Chum at all costs.
43a	17a	"Tooth or Scare"	Eddie Trigueros	Michael Caine	Justin Nichols	October 23, 2012	204a	0.85
The boys try to convince the wizard tooth fairy that Kyle did not lose his tooth.
43b	17b	"Igloo of Irritation"	Brandon Kruse	Steve Tompkins, Michael Caine, Russ Carney & Ron Corcillo	Matt Whitlock	October 23, 2012	211a	0.85
When the boys crash land on Planet Hasselhoth, their friendly visit with Man-Arctica results in the trio's capture by Man-Arctica's nemesis, Global Warmer.
44a	18a	"Bubble Trouble"	Ken Mitchroney	Michael Caine	Kyle A. Carrozza	October 24, 2012	213a	0.93
Boog is ecstatic to meet the Chimp Chomp champion. However, the boys have to get Boog across the street when he has an allergy to their Man-Arctic Seal uniforms and is stuck in his childhood bubble.
44b	18b	"Lucky Chums"	Tom King	Steve Tompkins	Katie Rice	October 24, 2012	213b	0.93
Fanboy and Chum Chum find a Leprechaun in a box of cereal, but he refuses to give them the mystery cereal shape the cereal box promised.
45a	19a	"Hex Games"	Brandon Kruse	Derek Iverson	Matt Whitlock	October 25, 2012	220b	0.98
Kyle is angered when Sigmund releases a new video game, but when he learns the winner gets to go to Milkweed, Fanboy and Chum Chum help him win it.
45b	19b	"Speed Eraser"	Ken Mitchroney	Michael Caine, Russ Carney & Ron Corcillo, Steve Tompkins	David Gemmill	October 25, 2012	221a	0.98
When Kyle loses his job as Official Chalkboard Eraser to Fanboy, Kyle gives him a magical eraser that can erase whole objects, hoping it will get Fanboy in trouble, but instead it makes him a star.
46a	20a	"Microphonies"	Ken Mitchroney	Michael Caine, Russ Carney & Ron Corcillo, Steve Tompkins	Kyle A. Carrozza	October 26, 2012	225a	0.92
Fanboy and Chum Chum's new "Ultra Deluxe Mega Mic" toy allows them to make their own crazy sound effects in addition to auto-tuning their voices. Problems arise when Fanboy and Chum Chum abuse the Mega Mic and make Mr. Mufflin think that school's out. Things get even worse when it starts to make sounds on its own.
46b	20b	"Freezy Freaks"	Brandon Kruse	Michael Caine, Russ Carney & Ron Corcillo, Steve Tompkins	Vaughn Tada	October 26, 2012	224b	0.92
When Boog is forced to wear the costume of the Frosty Mart mascot Freezy, the boys are convinced he is the real Freezy.
47a	21a	"Two Tickets to Paladise"	Tom King	Michael Caine, Russ Carney & Ron Corcillo, Steve Tompkins	Scott Bern	October 29, 2012	218b	0.90
When best pals Fanboy and Chum Chum notice a frightening rift in their friendship, Oz teaches them how to return to "paladise".
47b	21b	"The Winners"	Ken Mitchroney	Michael Caine, Russ Carney & Ron Corcillo, Steve Tompkins	Kyle A. Carrozza	October 29, 2012	220b	0.90
After Fanboy and Chum Chum discover they have the Frosty Freezy Freeze Sweepstakes winning cup, everyone in Galaxy Hills conspires to take it from them.
48a	22a	"Slime Day"	Tom King	Steve Tompkins	James Burks	October 30, 2012	206a	0.80
Fanboy and Chum Chum can't figure out how to get slimed on Slime Day, because they don't know the secret phrase. So they travel to the Nickelodeon studio to get the secret phrase from the president of the company.
48b	22b	"Boog Zapper"	Tom King	Russ Carney & Ron Corcillo	Ed Baker	October 30, 2012	207b	0.80
Fed up with Boog's bullying, Fanboy builds up an electric charge so he can shock Boog.
49	23	"Super Chums"	Tom King	Michael Caine, Russ Carney & Ron Corcillo, Steve Tompkins	Ed Baker and Katie Rice	October 31, 2012	224a 224b	0.81
In this superhero cartoon parody, Super Chum works with Fannihilator to stop Copy Kitten from taking Fannihilator's place as Super Chum's best nemesis. Note 1: This is the third half-hour special to air.
50a	24a	"Buddy Up"	Ken Mitchroney	Michael Caine, Russ Carney & Ron Corcillo, Steve Tompkins	David Gemmill	November 1, 2012	222b	0.88
Fanboy, Chum Chum and Kyle partner up for a field trip to the Dinosaur Museum. Kyle refuses to cooperate with the buddy system, and the three wind up lost in the desert, where they encounter a real life dinosaur (a Carcharodontosaurus, to be precise).
50b	24b	"Normal Day"	Brandon Kruse	Michael Caine, Russ Carney & Ron Corcillo, Steve Tompkins	Matt Whitlock	November 1, 2012	222a	0.88
Fanboy and Chum Chum's plans to have a totally normal day are ruined when all the weird things and characters they've been faced with on their many adventures return to town, including Thorvald.
51a	25a	"Dental Illness"	Brandon Kruse	Kristine Songco	Vaughn Tada	November 2, 2012	223a	0.89
When Fanboy gets a toothache, he must overcome his fear of the dentist to seek treatment. Worst of all, the dentist is a vampire with a scary-sounding machine called the "Extractor" in his office.
51b	25b	"Champ of Chomp"	Eddie Trigueros	Michael Caine, Russ Carney & Ron Corcillo, Steve Tompkins	Eddie Trigueros and Ray Morelli	November 2, 2012	215a	0.89
The boys endeavor to help Boog beat the all-time record in Chimp Chomp. However they accidentally unplug the machine and delete Boog's score when he finally beats the record.
52	26	"Brain Freeze"	Eddie Trigueros	Michael Caine	David Gemmill and Justin Nichols	July 12, 2014 (Note: This episode was first released on the Brain Freeze DVD on August 16, 2011.)	205 206	N/A
After losing their memories from a wicked brain freeze, Fanboy and Chum Chum must retrace their steps to locate their missing underwear. Note 1: This is the fourth and final half-hour special to air. Note 2: This episode was originally released direct-to-video and eventually aired on July 12, 2014 on Nicktoons.
