= Firehouse Dog =

2007 American family film

- Theatrical release poster
- Directed by: Todd Holland
- Written by: Claire-Dee Lim; Mike Werb; Michael Colleary
- Produced by: Michael Colleary; Mike Werb
- Starring: Josh Hutcherson; Bruce Greenwood; Dash Mihok; Steven Culp; Bill Nunn
- Cinematography: Victor Hammer
- Edited by: Scott J. Wallace
- Music by: Jeff Cardoni
- Production companies: Regency Enterprises; New Regency
- Distributed by: 20th Century Fox
- Release date: April 4, 2007
- Running time: 111 minutes
- Country: United States
- Language: English
- Box office: $17.3 million

Firehouse Dog is a 2007 American family film produced by Regency Enterprises and distributed by 20th Century Fox. Directed by Todd Holland, it stars Josh Hutcherson, Bruce Greenwood, Dash Mihok, Steven Culp and Bill Nunn. It was released on April 4, 2007, in the United States. It received mixed-to-negative reviews.

== Plot ==
Rexxx, an Irish Terrier movie star, is separated from his owner Trey after lighting strikes their plane during a skydiving stunt. While Trey mourns his dog's apparent death, Rexxx makes a home in an abandoned warehouse, desperately missing his owner.

Shane Fahey is mourning the death of his uncle, Capt. Marc Fahey, and Blue (the former "Firehouse Dog") after they were trapped in a fire in a disused textile mill. Realizing he forgot to study for a test, Shane ditches school, but is caught by two other firefighters. Arriving at the fire station (known as 'Dogpatch'), he is chastised by both driver Joe and his own father Connor, who was recently promoted to Captain after Marc's death. The station is about to be closed due to a lack of funding and overall bad publicity. Dogpatch is called out to a fire in a derelict apartment building. Due to a slow suit-up and engine trouble, the team is the last to arrive and is put on standby by rival Greenpoint station Captain Jessie Presley. Shane notices Rexxx balancing atop the burning building and Connor manages to rescue him. The station renames the dog Dewey and keeps him until someone claims him.

Shane struggles to cope with Dewey's spoilt needs and strange habits. Realizing the dog is fast and active, Shane enters him in a firefighter's competition, where they are pitted against rival fire station Greenpoint. Dewey initially beats the other station's score, but is distracted by their Dalmatian. Despite losing the competition, Shane and Dewey begin to bond.

The next morning, the station is called out to a tunnel collapse. Everyone has already been evacuated upon their arrival, but Connor notices Captain Presley is unaccounted for and initiates a search. He rushes into the wreckage, and Shane, fearing for his father's safety, allows Dewey to run in after him. Dewey alerts Connor to Jessie's presence, saving her life. Following this, the station begins to gain popularity, and city manager Zach Hayden notifies them that the station is saved.

Shane becomes upset when his father moves to his uncle's former office. He roots through the files, where he discovers an unnerving number of suspected arsons within the general area of the station. Later that night, Dewey is awarded a medal for his bravery at a firefighter's gala and ends up reuniting with Trey; Connor reluctantly allows Trey to keep the dog.

A few hours later, Dewey escapes Trey's hotel room to chase after the station's engine, which was called out to another fire on a garbage barge at the harbor. They struggle to put the barge fire out, and Shane returns to the station and discovers that the fire was simply a decoy, so that the suspected arsonist could burn down "Dogpatch" station. He confronts Zach, who reveals that he burned the buildings to allow the construction of a football stadium for City Chief Corbin Sellars–killing Shane's uncle. After the station's closure was denied, Zach decided to burn it down himself, but didn't know Shane was inside. The two are trapped in the burning building when Zach's incendiary device ignites; Shane loses consciousness and Zach is forced to leave the building prematurely.

Dewey races back to the station as Connor, having been alerted to the fire by Jessie, follows behind. Dewey finds Zach trying to escape, and temporarily traps him in a phone booth before finding Shane. Dewey awakens Shane and the two try to find a way out of the burning fire station. Connor arrives on the scene, only to find the station completely inaccessible. Hearing Dewey's barking, he manages to break down the garage door and finds Shane. Dewey leads them outside where Shane tells Connor about Zach's arson attacks. Furious, Connor confronts Zach before the other Dogpatch firefighters hand him over to the police.

Sellars' scam is exposed and he is also arrested. All the firefighters at the station are awarded medals, including Shane and Dewey. Trey allows Shane to keep him and the station is repaired with their truck receiving a new engine.

== Cast ==
- Josh Hutcherson as Shane Fahey
- Bruce Greenwood as Captain Connor Fahey
- Dash Mihok as Trey Falcon
- Steven Culp as city manager Zachary Hayden
- Bill Nunn as driver/engineer Joe Musto
- Bree Turner as Liz Knowles
- Scotch Ellis Loring as Lionel Bradford
- Mayte Garcia as Pep Clemente, the station mechanic
- Teddy Sears as probie firefighter Terrence Kahn
- Claudette Mink as Captain Jessie Presley
- Hannah Lochner as Jasmine "J.J." Presley
- Matt Cooke as city chief Corbin Sellars
- Shane Daly as Burr Baldwin
- Randy Triggs as Captain Marc Fahey
- Arwen, Frodo, Rohan, Stryder as Rexxx / Dewey the dog

== Production notes ==
Rexxx/Dewey is played in the film by four different Irish Terriers named Arwen, Frodo, Rohan and Stryder, named after the characters/location from The Lord of the Rings story.

The film was shot in Toronto and Hamilton, Ontario, Canada.

The building used to portray the fire station is located at 455 Cherry Street in Toronto. The garage section of the building was built specifically for the movie and was torn down after production. This area of Toronto has changed greatly since the movie was filmed.

== Release ==
The film was filmed in 2005 but not released until April 4, 2007.

It grossed $3.8 million in its opening weekend for a 5-day total of $5.1 million. Firehouse Dog grossed $13.9 million in the United States and $3.5 million in other countries for a worldwide total of $17.4 million.

=== Home media ===
The film was released on DVD on July 31, 2007.

== Reception ==
Firehouse Dog received mixed to negative reviews from film critics. From 81 critics, it garnered 37% positive reviews on the film-critic aggregate site Rotten Tomatoes. The site's consensus states: "Firehouse Dog's cute premise is ruined with endless fart and poop jokes, and an overlong run time." The film garnered a score of 43/100 on Metacritic from 20 reviews. Justin Chang of Variety called it, "A likable but ungainly mutt of a movie". Ty Burr in The Boston Globe found "the human scenes in Firehouse Dog are perfectly acceptable on the level of a heartwarming family B-movie" but "that dog—or, rather, that digitally enhanced replicant—is just plain creepy". While Carrie Rickey of The Philadelphia Inquirer called it "touching, family-friendly entertainment", Chris Kaltenbach of The Baltimore Sun felt it was "too busy being inspirational and cuddly to be funny or pointed" and "plays out as though its plot was stuck in molasses". Frank Lovece of Film Journal International capped his review by suggesting that, "Firehouse Dog should be put to sleep before it can do the same to audiences". Michael Phillips of the Chicago Tribune says: "Once it figures out it is more drama than comedy, "Firehouse Dog" exceeds your limited expectations.... While the movie's ad campaign suggests wacky antics all the way, a surprisingly affecting and well-acted father/son relationship develops."

== See also ==
- List of American films of 2007
- List of firefighting films
