= Chris Easterly =

American screenwriter and television writer

- Occupations: Screenwriter, television writer
- Years active: 2008–present

Chris Easterly is an American screenwriter and television writer. He has written for the television series Past Life, Unnatural History and the television films Click Clack Jack: A Rail Legend and The Shunning. He is an assistant professor at Regent University in Virginia Beach, Virginia.

Easterly is a native of Frankfort, Kentucky and is a graduated from the University of Kentucky. He is a Catholic. He has also written a book "Falling Forward: A Man's Memoir of Divorce".
