= Dyana Liu =

Taiwanese-American actress

- Born: Taipei, Taiwan
- Education: University of Pennsylvania
- Occupation: Actress
- Years active: 2007–present

Dyana Liu is a Taiwanese-American actress. Liu is known for co-starring in the Cartoon Network live-action series Tower Prep.

== Career ==
Liu was born in Taipei, Taiwan to a Hakka father and a Taiwanese mother, and she then grew up in Ithaca, New York. At age five, she began playing classical piano and did not pursue an acting career until college. She attended school at the University of Pennsylvania while also studying acting at the Walnut Street Theatre. After graduating from college, she returned to Ithaca to perform in local theater before moving to Los Angeles to pursue a career in film and television. She made her television acting debut guest-starring on an episode of The Unit. The next year, she co-starred in the independent western film Between the Sand and the Sky opposite Dee Wallace. In 2009, she appeared in the film Down for Life, which also starred Danny Glover. In 2010, she co-starred as Suki Sato in the Cartoon Network live-action series Tower Prep.

== Filmography ==
Film and television
Year	Title	Role	Notes
2007	The Unit	Waitress	TV series, 1 episode
2008	Between the Sand and the Sky	Wu Ping	Independent film
2008	Rita Rocks	Pierson	TV series, 1 episode
2009	Fanboy & Chum Chum	Yo	Voice over role
2010	Down for Life	Kathy	Theatrical film
2010	Tower Prep	Suki Sato	TV series, regular role
2012–2013	Suburgatory	Wan'Er	TV series, 3 episodes
2013	Rizzoli & Isles	Karine Alberts	TV series, 1 episode
2014	Franklin & Bash	Connie Choi	TV series, 1 episode
2014–2016	Grey's Anatomy	Nurse	TV series, 2 episodes
2015	Classic Alice	Lily Oh	Web series, 13 episodes
2015–2017	Pig Goat Banana Cricket	Lady Primavera Van de Snuggles, Tiny Goosey, B-Girl	Voice over role
