= Jeff Eckerle =

American television producer and writer

- Occupation(s): Producer and writer
- Years active: 1996–present

Jeff Eckerle is an American television producer and writer. He is a graduate of the University of Wisconsin (BA) and the UCLA Anderson School of Management (MBA), and worked as a development and programming executive for Fox (FBC), CBS Productions and Wolf Films before segueing into writing and producing full-time. Credits include Supervising Producer/Writer on Law & Order: Special Victims Unit, Tower Prep, Unnatural History and Those Who Kill starring Chloe Sevigny and James D'Arcy for A&E Network. He is partnered with fellow writer/producer Marilyn Osborn.
