= Click Clack Jack =

2008 film directed by Ryan Bodie

Click Clack Jack: A Rail Legend
- Film poster
- Directed by: Ryan Bodie
- Written by: Chris Easterly
- Starring: Keith Peyton Thomas; James Burns; Robert Pierce
- Music by: John Doryk
- Production companies: Studio 26 Productions; Sunday Rising Films
- Release dates: November 2008 (WYSIWYG Film Festival); September 1, 2009 (United States)
- Country: United States
- Language: English

Click Clack Jack: A Rail Legend is a 2008 Christian family film directed by Ryan Bodie. The film has received several film festival awards, including Best Short Film at the New York International Independent Film and Video Festival. It was produced in California on an estimated budget of $1,000,000.

== Plot ==
Click Clack Jack is a family film about an 1870s rail engineer, "Click Clack" Jack, who uses principles from the Bible to try and save Potters Gap from the evil Baron Snodgrass. Snodgrass is seeking to destroy the town to further his own ambition and look for gold beneath it.

== Cast ==
- Keith Peyton Thomas as Click Clack Jack
- James Burns as Hobo
- Robert Pierce as Baron Snodgrass
- Mike Muscat as Museum Guide

== Production ==
The production of Click Clack Jack spanned several months of character development, casting in Bradenton and on the West Coast and filming in California. The idea for the film was originally conceived in 2000. The filmmakers have said they found technical crew members whose resumes include work with shows such as Heroes, Scrubs, Without a Trace and the Christian-based football film Facing the Giants. Studio 26 Productions was involved in producing the film.

Director Ryan Bodie said, "One of the biggest reasons for starting Studio 26 was to help with ministry videos and Christian entertainment. There is a real need for both. My dream is to use profit from Studio 26 to produce high-end productions for ministries around the world and to produce clean entertainment for all ages."

== Awards ==
- 2008 Christian WYSIWYG Film Festival

Best Feature Film (Won)
Best Production Value (Won)

- 2008 New York International Independent Film and Video Festival

Best Short Film (Won)

- 2009 Texandance International Film Festival

Best Family Film (Won)
