= Mike Werb =

American screenwriter

- Born: Los Angeles, California, United States
- Education: Stanford University; UCLA School of Theater, Film and Television
- Occupation: Screenwriter
- Writing career
- Notable work: Face/Off

Mike Werb is an American screenwriter, whose writing credits include Face/Off, The Mask, and the story for Lara Croft: Tomb Raider.

A Los Angeles native, Werb attended Stanford. He is a UCLA Film School graduate.

He has worked as a collaborator with Michael Colleary. The duo won a Saturn Award for Best Writing for Face/Off in 1998. They previously worked on projects "Top Ten", "Stretch Armstrong", and "King's Ransom" (the latter one for director John Woo), but none of these films were produced. He is the creator of Unnatural History.

== Credits ==
=== Film ===
Year	Film	Credit	Notes
1989	Food of the Gods 2	Screenplay by	Co-wrote screenplay with Richard Bennett, based on a story by Richard Bennett; as E. Kim Brewster
1989	The Secret of the Ice Cave	Written by	As Michael Werb
1991	The Human Shield	Story by	Co-wrote story with Mann Rubin
1991	The Disco Years	Story editor	Short film
1994	The Mask	Screenplay by	Based on a story by Michael Fallon and Mark Verheiden
1996	Darkman III: Die Darkman Die	Written by	Co-wrote with Michael Colleary
1997	Things That Go Bump	Written by, supervising producer	Co-wrote with Michael Colleary
1997	Face/Off	Written by, co-producer	Co-wrote with Michael Colleary
2001	Lara Croft: Tomb Raider	Story by	Co-wrote story with Michael Colleary and Sara B. Cooper
2006	Curious George	Story by	Co-wrote with Ken Kaufman
2007	Firehouse Dog	Written by, producer	Co-wrote with Claire-Dee Lim & Michael Colleary
2009	Tekken	Uncredited script work	Co-wrote with Michael Colleary

=== Television ===
The numbers in writing credits refer to the number of episodes.

Title	Year	Credited as			Network	Notes
Title	Year	Creator	Writer	Executive Producer	Network	Notes
Tarzan	2003	Developer	Yes (1)	No	The WB	
Unnatural History	2010	Yes	Yes (5)	Yes	Cartoon Network	
Extant	2015	No	Yes (1)	No	CBS	consulting producer (3 episodes)
Salvation	2017–18	No	Yes (3)	No	CBS	consulting producer (19 episodes)
