= Unnatural History (TV series) =

- Genre: Action-adventure; Dramedy; Teen drama
- Created by: Mike Werb
- Starring: Kevin G. Schmidt; Jordan Gavaris; Italia Ricci; Martin Donovan
- Composer: Robert Carli
- Country of origin: United States
- Original language: English
- No. of seasons: 1
- No. of episodes: 13

Production
- Executive producers: Mike Werb; Thania St. John; Mikael Salomon
- Producer: Carol Dunn Trussell
- Production location: Toronto (filming)
- Cinematography: Miroslaw Baszak; Bruce Chun; John Dyer
- Editors: Michele Conroy; Michael Doherty; Ben Wilkinson
- Camera setup: Film; Single-camera
- Running time: 45 minutes
- Production companies: Mike Werb Productions; Warner Horizon Television

Original release
- Network: Cartoon Network; YTV
- Release: June 13 – September 21, 2010

Unnatural History is a television series produced by Warner Horizon Television for Cartoon Network and YTV.

The series is the second scripted, live-action show on Cartoon Network after Out of Jimmy's Head. The series consisted of thirteen hour-long episodes and premiered on Sunday, June 13, 2010. On July 13, the series was rescheduled to Tuesday nights.

It is only the second Cartoon Network show outside of Adult Swim and Toonami to have the U.S. rating of "TV-PG-V", and a parental-guidance warning after every commercial break and at the beginning of the show (the first being Star Wars: The Clone Wars); its rating in Canada for most episodes is "G", or else "PG".

On November 19, 2010, Cartoon Network cancelled the series after one season.

== Premise ==
This series is centered on Henry Griffin, a teenager with exceptional skills acquired through years of globe-trotting with his anthropologist parents. However, Henry faces his biggest challenge of all when he moves back to America to begin junior year at Smithson High School in Washington D.C., a place stranger than any he's ever lived before. Together with his cousin Jasper and Jasper's friend Maggie, he uses the skills he learned around the globe to solve the postmodern mysteries of high school.

== Cast and characters ==
=== Main characters ===
- Henry Griffin (Kevin G. Schmidt) is a globe-trotting teenager who must adjust to life as regular high school student. With his knowledge of different cultures, he uses his skills to solve different crimes and mysteries of ancient history. He has lived all over the world with his anthropologist parents. He was forced at the beginning of the pilot episode to move in with his cousin Jasper and uncle Bryan and start junior year of high school in Washington, D.C. His family's constant re-locations include Bhutan, Liberia, Mexico, Turkmenistan, Japan, Peru, Egypt and Brazil. Through these countries he has learned many different skills ranging from reading dead languages, martial arts, even escape artistisms. He is also quite skilled at parkour now living in the urban jungle. He exhibits somewhat impaired social interaction, and is often not attentive to Jasper and Maggie's conversations. He had a beloved, late godfather named Dante Mourneau, whose words of wisdom he still uses in times of uncertainty.
- Jasper Bartlett (Jordan Gavaris) is Henry's cousin in Washington, D.C. Unlike Henry, he does not like getting into trouble and prefers staying out of Henry's shenanigans but always gets involved anyway. He is very much into his schoolwork and dreams of attending Yale University. He was also shown in the series to possess a good memory. He and Maggie have known each other since they were ten and it's implied that Jasper has a crush on her, as he always seems to get jealous whenever she and Henry seem to express a romantic interest in each other.

The cast of Unnatural History (from left to right), Martin Donovan as Bryan Bartlett, Italia Ricci as Maggie Winnock, Kevin G. Schmidt as Henry Griffin and Jordan Gavaris as Jasper Bartlett.

- Margaret "Maggie" Winnock (Italia Ricci) is best friends with Henry and Jasper. Like Jasper, she is a very dedicated student. She does not have much of a sense of humor and when she is not in school she works part-time at the school's National Museum Complex. She is a vegetarian, and has photographic memory, which is often used to help solve mysteries. It's implied that she has a crush on Henry as he always protects her and she tells him everything first.
- Bryan Bartlett (Martin Donovan) is Henry's uncle (his mom's brother) and Jasper's dad. He is the dean of Smithson High School. He is always caught off guard by Henry's knowledge and troublesome ways, but welcomes them if they are done in good faith to better certain situations.

=== Recurring characters ===
- Hunter O'Herlihy (Wesley Morgan) is a stereotypical jock who plays for the football team of the school. He has very little intelligence and often displays abusive behavior to anyone around him, especially Jasper and Henry, often serving as an antagonist towards the group. However, he has shown some morals, as if someone helps him he will later repay the favor, stating he doesn't like to owe anybody.
- Julian Morneau (Matt Baram) is an Ornithology teacher as well as the estranged son of Dante. He is displayed as Henry's enemy in many episodes, which seems to stem from the fact that his father saw Henry as more of a son. He also appears to have his hands in shady places, such as helping in the illegal transport of an endangered species, as well as Henry is quick to suspect he might have a hand in some of the activities pertaining to the events of the episode.
- Rosmary Griffin (née Bartlett) (Jack Hourigan) is Henry's mother and the younger sister of Bryan who is actually skeptical of her son's recent activities and during the season finale, she and her husband at first views her son as a disgrace to the Griffin name after a humiliating incident, but after Henry saves the day once again, she and her husband realized what a great person her son really is around the campus.
- Zafer Griffin (Scott Yaphe) is Henry's father who was also skeptical of his son's recent activities, but later realized how good a person Henry really is.
- Michael O'Molley (Robbie Amell) is another antagonist of Henry and his friends. He also has a rude attitude in general. He works at the juice bar located at the National Museum Complex.

== Episodes ==
No.	Title	Directed by	Written by	Original release date	Prod. code	US viewers (millions)
1	"Pilot"	Mikael Salomon	Mike Werb	June 13, 2010	100	1.390
Henry learns upon arriving in America that his beloved godfather, Dante Morneau (Colin Fox), has recently died during work, presumably of a heart attack. Henry has suspicions and investigates, soon learning that Dante had located a missing Civil War submarine - the USS Alligator - that reportedly contains millions in Army payroll gold. Henry and Jasper must race to find the sub and the treasure before the killers find it. Reluctant to accept his new environment, Henry ultimately learns that his new school and his friendship with Jasper and Maggie offer a lot that he didn't have in his previous life.
2	"The Griffin Gang"	John Kretchmer	Chris Easterly	June 20, 2010	103	1.114
Jasper works hard managing the installation of a new museum exhibit in hopes to impress a college recruiter from Yale University, but Henry attempts to help only muddle his first impressions. Desperate to help, Henry digs through the DOUM (Division of Obscure and Unknown Miscellany) Rooms and comes up with props for Jasper's exhibit, including an old Pony Express mail bag. They sort through the undelivered letters and find clues to the location of the only shipment of silver that came from the Carson Creek Mines before all miners mysteriously died. Thinking it would be a great discovery for the display, the team sets off in search of the treasure. They are double crossed by an upperclassman named Zane, who claims the discovery for his own exhibit. Shortly afterwards, however, people start getting ill and acting strange. Returning to the letters, Henry discovers that a rare Red Bat Fever is to blame and was released by the artifacts. He then races to find an antidote before it's too late.
3	"Sleeper in a Box"	Paul Shapiro	Michael Colleary	June 27, 2010	102	1.224
A box causing strange sounds in the DOUM room captures Henry's attention one night in the museum. Similarly, his attention is captured by a girl named Whitney (Ashley Leggat), who he bonds with as she interviews Henry for the school website. Investigating the strange properties of the "stone" in the box, the team discovers that under a layer of crud, it's actually the remnants of the Soviet satellite Sputnik 1, which has crashed to the ground only weeks ago. When the satellite is stolen, Henry is shocked to learn that Whitney's advances may have only been to get access to the satellite. The team investigates and learns that Whitney's family is being threatened by the Russian Mafia who want the satellite for the information it contains, which would be priceless on the black market. They race to keep it out of the mobsters' hands and to keep Whitney safe.
4	"Heart of a Warrior"	Tim Southam	Jeff Eckerle and Marilyn Osborn	July 13, 2010	104	N/A
The high school hosts the Japanese Martial Arts Team as part of a cultural exchange accompanying the opening of an exhibit of samurai artifacts. Henry is impressed by Hoshi (Ellen Wong), a girl traveling with the martial arts team, who falls under suspicion when he believes that somebody is trying to steal the revered Samurai's Heart. Is there a thief or could it be that the rumors that the exhibit is haunted is the reason? Meanwhile, Maggie busily organizes the school dance in an effort to mask her own insecurities about attending it.
5	"Fountain of Truth"	Holly Dale	Thania St. John	July 20, 2010	105	1.114
Henry attends the reading of his Uncle Dante's will and is given a box of antiquities with a letter from Dante telling him that he is now the keeper of a dangerous secret. When the box and letter are stolen, Henry embarks on a quest to learn the secret. This leads him to a plant that seems to be from the Ponce de León expedition to find the Fountain of Youth. At the same time, the mediocre basketball team starts performing exceptionally well. Suspicious that the plant may have some powers of vitality, derived from the Fountain of Youth, the team investigates.
6	"Public School Enemies"	Chris Grismer	Mike Werb	July 27, 2010	106	1.224
During a car exhibit, Henry finds a letter from John Dillinger to J. Edgar Hoover about a stash of money. The trio go on the hunt for the money to save the school budget cuts and the dean's job. Meanwhile, some unknown kids at school steal Jasper's laptop.
7	"The Liberian Candidate"	Paul Shapiro	Michael Colleary	August 3, 2010	107	1.217
Henry's friend, Tomba Tolo from Liberia comes to live in D.C. while with his ambassador father, Samuel Tolo (Conrad Coates) is running for president of Liberia. But things turn for the worse after a number of assassination attempts are made on Samuel with Tomba being hypnotized into doing them.
8	"Curse of the Rolling Stone"	David Solomon	Mike Werb	August 10, 2010	101	N/A
Maggie shares her suspicions about strange events surrounding the "Fortuna Ruby" exhibit at the museum. Like the "Hope Diamond", this priceless gemstone is rumored to carry a curse - and unfortunate events at the museum seem to confirm this. The group quickly surmises that someone is "creating" these unlucky events as a diversion to pull off a robbery. The team must foil the robbery, revealing the purpose for stealing the gem are far more sinister than they thought. Despite their differing opinions on whether good luck actually exists or not, the team learns to work together while trying to explain the bizarre events that happen. This episode aired out of order and takes place immediately after the pilot episode.
9	"Now You See Me..."	John Fawcett	Chris Easterly	August 17, 2010	108	1.238
Henry investigates the disappearance of a Senator's son after he makes him vanish using one of Harry Houdini's old tricks. The case is so serious that the FBI is brought in to investigate, as it could be a threat to national security. Also, Henry becomes very popular in school after winning 2 U2 tickets in a raffle and everyone wants to go with him including Jasper and Maggie.
10	"Maximum Insecurity"	Ken Girotti	Rob Wright	August 24, 2010	109	N/A
When thieves try to steal a World War II-era computer from the museum, Henry, Maggie and Jasper are trapped in the process. Then, eventually, Jasper gets captured and tied up. Meanwhile, Henry and Maggie run around the museum as they try to rescue Jasper, stop the thieves, and must think about taking an important exam the next day.
11	"Thor's Slammer"	Mikael Salomon	Story by : Jeff Eckerle and Marilyn Osborn; Teleplay by : Michael Colleary and Mike Werb	August 31, 2010	110	1.406
Henry is nearly swallowed by quicksand, while he is under, he finds an old hammer called Mjöllnir and a mummified body. The body is of a man who was murdered fifteen years ago, he was the father of fellow student and was a colleague of Dean Bartlett. But when Dean Bartlett is accused of the murder, Henry tries to clear his uncle's name by solving the murder and finding the Viking artifact that murdered man was looking for.
12	"Speetlemania"	Michael DeCarlo	Thania St. John	September 14, 2010	111	N/A
A supposedly extinct insect is mailed to Julian Morneau and a mysterious and hostile man wants it. The gang finds the prehistoric bug, and it tags along to the Bartletts' house. Meanwhile, Henry and Jasper convince Maggie to plan a house party for them, but the party quickly becomes wild and out of control, especially with an indestructible insect on the loose.
13	"Past, Presidents, and Future"	Allan Kroeker	Story by : Mike Werb; Teleplay by : Michael Colleary and Mike Werb	September 21, 2010	112	N/A
While trying to earn extra credit to pass his history class, Henry finds a trail of clues left by George Washington about an atomic bomb that was created by Benjamin Franklin. Henry also must decide whether to stay in D.C. or go back to his old life living with his parents all over the world. Meanwhile, Maggie and Jasper both run for office in the school election. The election turns out to be a tie, leaving Henry with the swing vote. In the end, Henry invites Jasper and Maggie to come along with him to Mongolia over the summer. While hunting fossils in the desert, they hear a mysterious animal sound.

== Reception ==
=== Critical reception ===
Unnatural History received mixed to positive reviews from critics, with Barry Garron of The Hollywood Reporter praising it as "an appealing mix between The Hardy Boys and Indiana Jones with National Treasure thrown in for good measure". Los Angeles Times writer Robert Lloyd found the show fun and lively, composed of "familiar, mashed-together" action-adventure themes. Variety reviewer Brian Lowry was more critical, calling it "unexciting" and lacking "the requisite thrills a young audience weaned on big-budget movies is apt to demand."

=== Viewer reception ===
According to the Nielsen ratings, the premiere episode was watched by 1.39 million viewers, though the pilot episode did not place in the Top 25 cable programs for the week of June 7–13, 2010. Of that audience, the pilot episode earned 334,000 viewers among boys aged 6–11 earning a 2.7 in that demographic, with Cartoon Network claiming gains among kids 2-11, kids 9-14, and other kids demographics compared to the same time period the previous year.

== Cancellation and intended second season plans ==
On November 19, 2010, it was announced that Cartoon Network would not renew the series for a second season. On December 29, 2010, creator Mike Werb revealed that he intended to have the show picked up by another network, but a deal could not be secured. Werb also revealed his plans if the show had been renewed for a second season:

SEASON 2 THOUGHTS for those interested: I had planned a 2-part opener with extreme adventures involving Genghis Khan’s tomb, a Mongolian death worm, Henry’s disappearance in a sand storm, the rescue of a newborn camel as well as Henry’s parents and uncle Bryan. The rest of season 2 (upon the leads return to DC) would have covered subjects ranging from the kids finding the 18½ minute gap of the Nixon/Watergate tapes, Hemingway's lost novel, vampire finches (they really exist), a Stradivarius violin, a Native American mystery, DB Cooper, the underground railroad, etc. etc etc — plus a deepening of the triangular relationship between Henry, Maggie and Jasper, the return of Jasper’s mother from France — among other familial and emotional issues set against historical and scientific adventures.
Anyway, for the handful reading this — wishing you all a happy, healthy 2011.

— Mike Werb, creator, Unnatural History
