= Marilyn Osborn =

American television producer and writer

- Occupation(s): Producer and writer
- Years active: 1993–present

Marilyn Osborn is an American television producer and writer. She has written and produced for the series Space: Above and Beyond, The X-Files, Touched by an Angel and L.A. Doctors. She also served as a Consulting Producer on the series Promised Land.

Since meeting with fellow writer, Jeff Eckerle on Law & Order: Special Victims Unit, they have worked as a team on the subsequent projects Unnatural History, Tower Prep and Those Who Kill starring Chloe Sevigny and James D'Arcy for A&E Network.
