= Michael Colleary =

American film producer

- Born: Montclair, New Jersey
- Occupations: Film producer, screenwriter, television writer
- Years active: 1988–present

Michael Colleary is an American film producer, screenwriter and television writer. His writing credits include Face/Off, Firehouse Dog, The New Alfred Hitchcock Presents, the story for Lara Croft: Tomb Raider, and the Cartoon Network live-action series Unnatural History.

He is a frequent collaborator with Mike Werb, whom Colleary met at UCLA after Werb had sold his car to cover tuition and Colleary had given him lifts in his car. Together they won a Saturn Award for their original screenplay of Face/Off.

Colleary is the writer-showrunner of the independently financed, action-adventure TV series, Professionals, starring Tom Welling, Brendan Fraser, and Elena Anaya, which currently airs on the CW network.

Colleary was born and raised in Montclair, New Jersey. The son of comedy writer Robert M. Colleary, he graduated in 1978 from Montclair High School. He attended Temple University and studied journalism there, before heading west to do graduate work in screenwriting at the UCLA School of Theater, Film and Television.

He is married to screenwriter Shannon Bradley-Colleary, whose film To the Stars premiered at the Sundance Film Festival in 2019.
