= Face/Off =

1997 film by John Woo

- Theatrical release poster
- Directed by: John Woo
- Written by: Mike Werb; Michael Colleary
- Produced by: Terence Chang; Christopher Godsick; Barrie M. Osborne; David Permut
- Starring: John Travolta; Nicolas Cage; Joan Allen; Gina Gershon; Alessandro Nivola
- Cinematography: Oliver Wood
- Edited by: Christian Wagner; Steven Kemper
- Music by: John Powell
- Production company: Permut Presentations; WCG Productions; Douglas-Reuther Productions; Paramount Pictures
- Distributed by: Paramount Pictures (United States and Canada); Buena Vista International (International) (Note: Distributed under the Touchstone Pictures banner.)
- Release date: June 27, 1997 (United States)
- Running time: 138 minutes
- Country: United States
- Language: English
- Budget: $80 million
- Box office: $246 million

Face/Off is a 1997 American science-fiction action thriller film (Note: Attributed to multiple references:) directed by John Woo, from a screenplay by Mike Werb and Michael Colleary. It stars John Travolta as an FBI agent and Nicolas Cage as a terrorist who undergo an experimental surgery to swap their faces and identities. The film co-stars Joan Allen, Gina Gershon, and Alessandro Nivola in his film debut, and features Dominique Swain (in her film debut), Nick Cassavetes, Harve Presnell, Colm Feore, CCH Pounder, and Thomas Jane in supporting roles.

Principal photography began on January 4, 1997, in Los Angeles and wrapped on April 1. The film score was composed by John Powell. Face/Off was Woo's third American film, and was his first in which he was given major creative control.

Face/Off was theatrically released on June 27, 1997, in the United States by Paramount Pictures and internationally by Buena Vista International through its Touchstone Pictures banner. It earned critical acclaim for the performances by Cage and Travolta and its stylized action sequences. The film earned $246 million worldwide on an $80 million budget, making it the 11th highest-grossing film of 1997. At the 70th Academy Awards, it was nominated for Best Sound Effects Editing.

Face/Off has gained a cult following and is considered as one of Woo's best films. A sequel is in development.

== Plot ==
FBI Special Agent Sean Archer survives an assassination attempt by Castor Troy, a terrorist-for-hire, but the bullet kills his son Michael. Archer then engages in an extended vendetta against Troy. It culminates, six years later, in his team ambushing Troy, who is with his younger brother and accomplice, Pollux, on a remote desert airstrip. Castor goads Archer by saying he knows of a bomb that is located somewhere in Los Angeles and is set to explode in a few days. Before Archer can learn more, Castor is knocked unconscious and falls into a coma. Pollux, in custody, affirms that the bomb is real but refuses to reveal its location.

In secret, Archer reluctantly undergoes a highly experimental face transplant procedure by Dr. Malcolm Walsh to take on Castor's face, voice, and appearance. Archer is taken to the same high-security prison where Pollux is being held in order to obtain information on the bomb's location. Castor unexpectedly awakens from his coma and discovers that his face is missing. He calls his gang, and they force Dr. Walsh to transplant Archer's face onto him. Meanwhile, Archer successfully learns the bomb's location from Pollux before being informed that he has a visitor. Anticipating a reunion with his colleagues and a return to his normal life, Archer instead finds Castor wearing his face. Upon revealing he has murdered everyone else who is aware about the face transplant, Castor gleefully informs Archer that he looks forward to ruining his FBI career and ravishing his wife.

Pollux is freed when he willingly tells Castor of the bomb's location, and Castor subsequently disarms the bomb. Castor earns admiration from the FBI office and becomes close to Archer's wife Eve and daughter Jamie, whom Archer had been neglecting while seeking to avenge the death of his son. Back at the prison, Archer escapes after staging a riot and retreats to Castor's headquarters. There, he meets Sasha, the sister of Castor's primary drug kingpin Dietrich Hassler, and her son Adam, who reminds him of Michael. Archer discovers that Adam is Castor's son. Castor learns of Archer's escape and hastily assembles a team to raid his headquarters.

The raid turns into a bloodbath, and many FBI agents and several members of Castor's gang, including Dietrich and Pollux, are killed. Archer, Sasha, and Adam all manage to escape. In the aftermath of the raid, Archer's supervisor, Director Victor Lazarro, angrily lambasts Castor for the unnecessary bloodshed he caused. Castor, still furious over Pollux's death, murders Lazarro and is subsequently promoted to acting director in his place. Meanwhile, after taking Sasha and Adam to a safe location, Archer approaches Eve and convinces her to test Castor's blood to confirm his identity. After testing the blood and being convinced that the man wearing her husband's face is in fact an imposter, Eve tells Archer that Castor will be vulnerable at Lazarro's funeral.

At the ceremony, Castor has taken Eve hostage. Sasha arrives, and a gunfight ensues; Sasha manages to save Eve after taking a bullet. Archer promises a dying Sasha that he will take care of Adam and raise him away from criminal life. Castor briefly takes Jamie hostage, but she escapes by stabbing him in the leg with the butterfly knife that he lent her earlier for self-defense.

Following the confrontation at the church, Castor reaches the docks and commandeers a speedboat while Archer commandeers one of his own to continue the pursuit. The chase ends when Archer forces Castor to the shore in a collision. With their boats grounded, the two proceed to fight to the death. Upon gaining the upper hand in the struggle, Archer manages to corner Castor at gunpoint with a speargun, only for the latter to prevent him from shooting by grabbing the firing mechanism. While admitting defeat, Castor tries to disfigure his face so that Archer will be doomed to wear the former's face forever. Before he can finish, Archer kicks Castor in the groin, causing him to lose his grip on the gun and allowing Archer to finally kill him.

Backup agents arrive and address Archer by his true name, having been convinced by Eve of Archer's identity. After the face transplant surgery is reversed, Archer returns home. He and Eve adopt Adam, keeping Archer's promise to Sasha.

== Cast ==
- John Travolta as Sean Archer / "Castor Troy"
- Nicolas Cage as Castor Troy / "Sean Archer"
- Joan Allen as Eve Archer, Sean's wife
- Dominique Swain as Jamie Archer, Eve and Sean's daughter
- Alessandro Nivola as Pollux Troy, Castor's brother
- Gina Gershon as Sasha Hassler, Dietrich's younger sister
- Nick Cassavetes as Dietrich Hassler, Troy's primary drug kingpin
- Harve Presnell as Victor Lazarro
- Colm Feore as Dr. Malcolm Walsh
- Robert Wisdom as Tito Biondi
- CCH Pounder as Hollis Miller
- Margaret Cho as Wanda Chang
- John Carroll Lynch as Prison Guard Walton
- Thomas Jane as Burke Hicks
- James Denton as Buzz
- Tommy Flanagan as Leo
- Matt Ross as Loomis
- Chris Bauer as Ivan Dubov

Other cast members in the film include Danny Masterson as Karl (a teenager who attempts to sexually assault Jamie), Myles Jeffrey as Michael Archer, David McCurley as Adam Hassler, Romy Walthall as Kimberly, Paul Hipp as Fitch, Kirk Baltz as Aldo, Lisa Boyle as Cindee, Lauren Sinclair as Agent Winters, Steve Hytner as Agent Howell, David Warshofsky as a bomb squad officer, and John Bloom as a prison electroshock technician.

== Production ==
=== Writing and development ===
Face/Off was written by Mike Werb and Michael Colleary in 1990 as a spec script. They were inspired to write it after a mutual friend injured themselves in a hang-gliding accident. The injury required the friend's face to be removed and reconstructed before being re-added onto their body. Werb and Colleary were also inspired by the film White Heat to create a plot where the main character survived a prison riot. Calling the brothers Castor and Pollux is a reference to Greek mythology; Castor and Pollux are the twins transformed by the ancient Greek god Zeus into the constellation Gemini. The script initially had a futuristic setting, but was later rewritten to be set in contemporary times.

Face/Off was optioned to Joel Silver and Warner Bros. in 1991. The option expired in 1994 and the project was purchased by Paramount Pictures. American director and producer Rob Cohen was originally set to direct the film but when the project was in a turnaround Cohen left to direct Dragonheart (1996). John Woo became attached in 1996.

=== Casting ===
Various actor pairings were considered for the parts of Sean Archer and Castor Troy, such as Sylvester Stallone and Arnold Schwarzenegger, Michael Douglas and Harrison Ford, and Alec Baldwin and Bruce Willis.

Johnny Depp wanted to play Sean Archer but passed on the role after reading the script. John Woo instead hired John Travolta and Nicolas Cage to play those characters. Michael Douglas served as an executive producer.

In preparation, Woo watched John Frankenheimer's 1966 film Seconds.

=== Filming ===
With an $80 million production budget, Face/Off made heavy use of action set pieces including several violent shootouts and a boat chase filmed in the Los Angeles area. The boat scene at the end of the film was shot in San Pedro.

Woo originally shot a different, more ambiguous ending. After test screenings, a more upbeat ending was shot.

== Soundtrack ==
Face/Off (Music From The Motion Picture Soundtrack)

Soundtrack album by John Powell
- Released: July 1, 1997
- Genre: Film score
- Length: 41:42
- Label: Hollywood Records
- Producers: Hans Zimmer; Alan Meyerson

John Powell film soundtrack album chronology
Face/Off (Music From The Motion Picture Soundtrack) (1997)	Endurance (The Original Motion Picture Soundtrack) (1998)

The Face/Off soundtrack was released by Hollywood Records on July 1, 1997, the week following the film's release. This was the first film to be composed by John Powell, and the score was produced by Hans Zimmer and Alan Meyerson.

About the score, Powell said: "John Woo wanted Hans [Zimmer] to do it, but he was too busy. So Hans said: 'I can't do it, but I knew a man who can.' And at that time I worked very hard to get Hans impressed, and he had some faith in me. He thought I'd be good for the film. Hans said to Woo: 'Let John do some stuff. I'll give you a guarantee that if John starts on the film and fails I'll fix it.' But I wrote themes that they like, I never did crash. Hans never wrote anything. He'd guide me when I was weary. I did get help, but from Gavin [Greenaway], he did some great sequences. We had to do 115 minutes of music in ten weeks." AllMusic gave the film's soundtrack album 1.5 out of 5 stars.

All music is composed by John Powell.

No.	Title	Length
1.	"Face On"	4:57
2.	"80 Proof Rock"	4:29
3.	"Furniture"	7:12
4.	"The Golden Section Derma Lift"	3:15
5.	"This Ridiculous Chin"	6:51
6.	"No More Drugs for That Man" (featuring Gavin Greenaway)	7:27
7.	"Hans' Loft" (featuring Gavin Greenaway)	3:34
8.	"Ready for the Big Ride‚ Bubba"	3:53
Total length:		41:42

== Home media ==
Face/Off was released on Region 1 DVD on October 7, 1998. A 10th Anniversary Collector's Edition DVD was released on September 11, 2007, and it was also released on the now-defunct HD DVD format on October 30, 2007, in the United States.

The film was released on Blu-ray in the United Kingdom on October 1, 2007, by Buena Vista Home Entertainment, and was released in the United States on May 20, 2008, by Paramount Home Entertainment.

The film was released on Ultra HD Blu-ray by Kino Lorber in December 2023, featuring a new 4K scan of the film.

== Reception ==
=== Box office ===
Face/Off was released in North America on June 27, 1997, and earned $23.4 million on its opening weekend, ranking number one in the domestic box office ahead of Hercules. It went on to become the 11th highest-grossing domestic and 14th highest-grossing worldwide film of 1997, earning a domestic total of $112 million, and $133 million in other territories for a total worldwide gross of $246 million.

=== Critical response ===
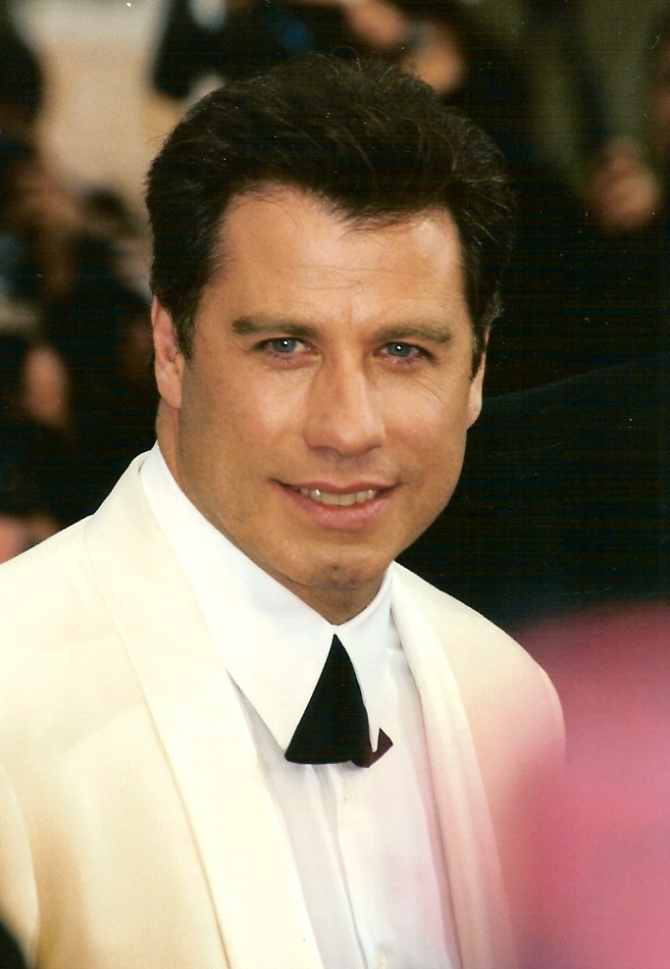
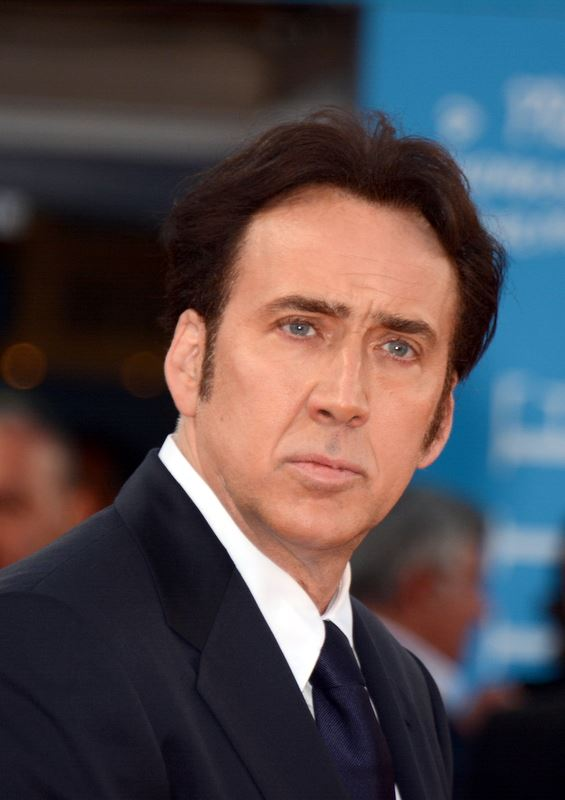
John Travolta and Nicolas Cage received praise for their performances.

The review aggregation website Rotten Tomatoes records that 93% of 95 critical reviews were positive, with an average rating of 7.80/10. The website's critical consensus reads: "John Travolta and Nicolas Cage play cat-and-mouse (and literally play each other) against a beautifully stylized backdrop of typically elegant, over-the-top John Woo violence." On Metacritic, the film received a score of 82 out of 100 from 26 critics. Audiences polled by CinemaScore gave the film an average grade of "B+" on an A+ to F scale.

The role reversal between Travolta and Cage was a subject of praise, as were the stylized, violent action sequences. Critic Roger Ebert of the Chicago Sun-Times gave the film three stars out of four and remarked the basic plot concept was "utterly absurd", but Woo's inventive direction along with clever performances made the film entertaining: "Here, using big movie stars and asking them to play each other, Woo and his writers find a terrific counterpoint to the action scenes: All through the movie, you find yourself reinterpreting every scene as you realize the 'other' character is 'really' playing it." Rolling Stone's Peter Travers said of the film, "You may not buy the premise or the windup, but with Travolta and Cage taking comic and psychic measures of their characters and their own careers, there is no resisting Face/Off. This you gotta see." Richard Corliss of Time said that the film "isn't just a thrill ride, it's a rocket into the thrilling past, when directors could scare you with how much emotion they packed into a movie".

Barbara Shulgasser of the San Francisco Examiner called the movie "idiotic" and argued that "Woo is clearly an imaginative man, and there is no doubt that he can concoct six ways to do any given piece of business ... a good director would choose the best of the six ways and put it in his movie. Woo puts all six in. If you keep your eyes closed during a Woo movie and open them every six minutes, you'll see everything you need to know to have a perfectly lovely evening at the cinema."

The film was nominated for the Academy Award for Best Sound Effects Editing (Mark Stoeckinger and Per Hallberg) at the 70th Academy Awards, but lost to another Paramount film, Titanic. Face/Off also won Saturn Awards for Best Director and Best Writing, and the MTV Movie Awards for Best Action Sequence (the speedboat chase) and Best On-Screen Duo for Travolta and Cage.

It has been labelled as part of the "holy trinity" of Nicolas Cage action films, along with Con Air (1997) and The Rock (1996). In 2022, Cage said the film had "aged beautifully".

=== Influence ===
Face/Off is said to have inspired Infernal Affairs. Director Andrew Lau stated he wanted to depict a more realistic situation; instead of a physical face change, Lau wanted to have the characters swap identities. The concept of "bian lian" or "change face", a technique traditionally used in Chinese opera, may have been used here to depict the fluid and seamless morph of Chen and Lau's characters' identities between the "good" and "bad" sides. Infernal Affairs, in turn, has spawned several adaptations, notably The Departed directed by Martin Scorsese, which won the Academy Award for Best Picture.

== Potential sequel ==
In September 2019, Paramount Pictures announced plans to remake Face/Off with a new cast. David Permut would be executive producer, with Neal Moritz to produce and Oren Uziel to write. In February 2021, it was reported that Adam Wingard would direct and the film would be a sequel to the first film, with him co-writing it with Simon Barrett. By February 2026, Wingard was no longer set to direct the sequel, leaving the production in search of a new director.
