= National Register of Historic Places listings in Exeter, Rhode Island =

This is a list of Registered Historic Places in Exeter, Rhode Island.

Contents: Counties in Rhode Island

Bristol | Kent | Newport | Providence (Pawtucket | Providence (city) | Woonsocket) | Washington

This National Park Service list is complete through NPS recent listings posted April 24, 2026.

	Name on the Register	Image	Date listed	Location	City or town	Description
1	Austin Farm Road Agricultural Area	Austin Farm Road Agricultural Area	August 16, 1977 (#77000009)	6 mi (9.7 km) west of Exeter off Interstate 95; 41°35′44″N 71°39′52″W	Exeter	
2	Baptist Church in Exeter	Baptist Church in Exeter	November 21, 1978 (#78000014)	North of Arcadia on RI 165; 41°34′36″N 71°42′36″W	Exeter	
3	Fisherville Historic and Archeological District	Fisherville Historic and Archeological District	December 5, 1980 (#80000017)	Address Restricted	Exeter	
4	Hallville Historic and Archeological District	Hallville Historic and Archeological District	December 5, 1980 (#80000020)	Address Restricted	Exeter	
5	Lawton's Mill	Lawton's Mill	June 27, 1980 (#80000022)	Ten Rod Rd. 41°34′54″N 71°34′13″W	Exeter	
6	Simon Lillibridge Farm	Simon Lillibridge Farm	November 28, 1978 (#78000020)	Summit Rd. 41°34′16″N 71°42′47″W	Exeter	
7	Parris Brook Historic and Archeological District	Parris Brook Historic and Archeological District	December 5, 1980 (#80000023)	Address Restricted	Exeter	
8	Queen's Fort	Queen's Fort	November 26, 1980 (#80000024)	Stony Lane; 41°35′30″N 71°31′15″W	Exeter	
9	Sodom Mill Historic and Archeological District		November 24, 1980 (#80000025)	Address Restricted	Exeter	

== See also ==
- National Register of Historic Places listings in Washington County, Rhode Island
- List of National Historic Landmarks in Rhode Island
