= Lloyd W. Kent =

American architect

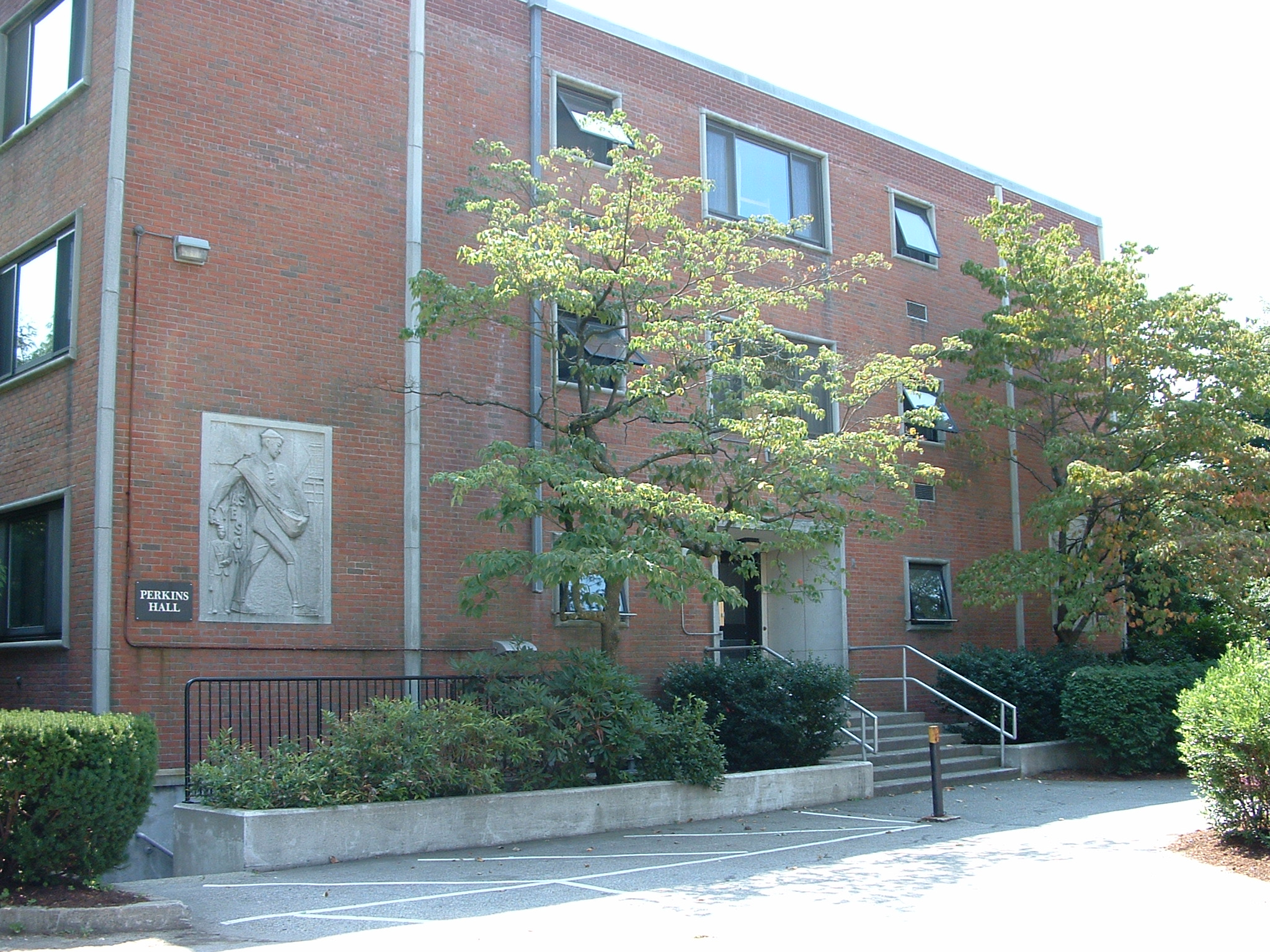
Perkins Hall, Brown University, Providence, RI. 1960.

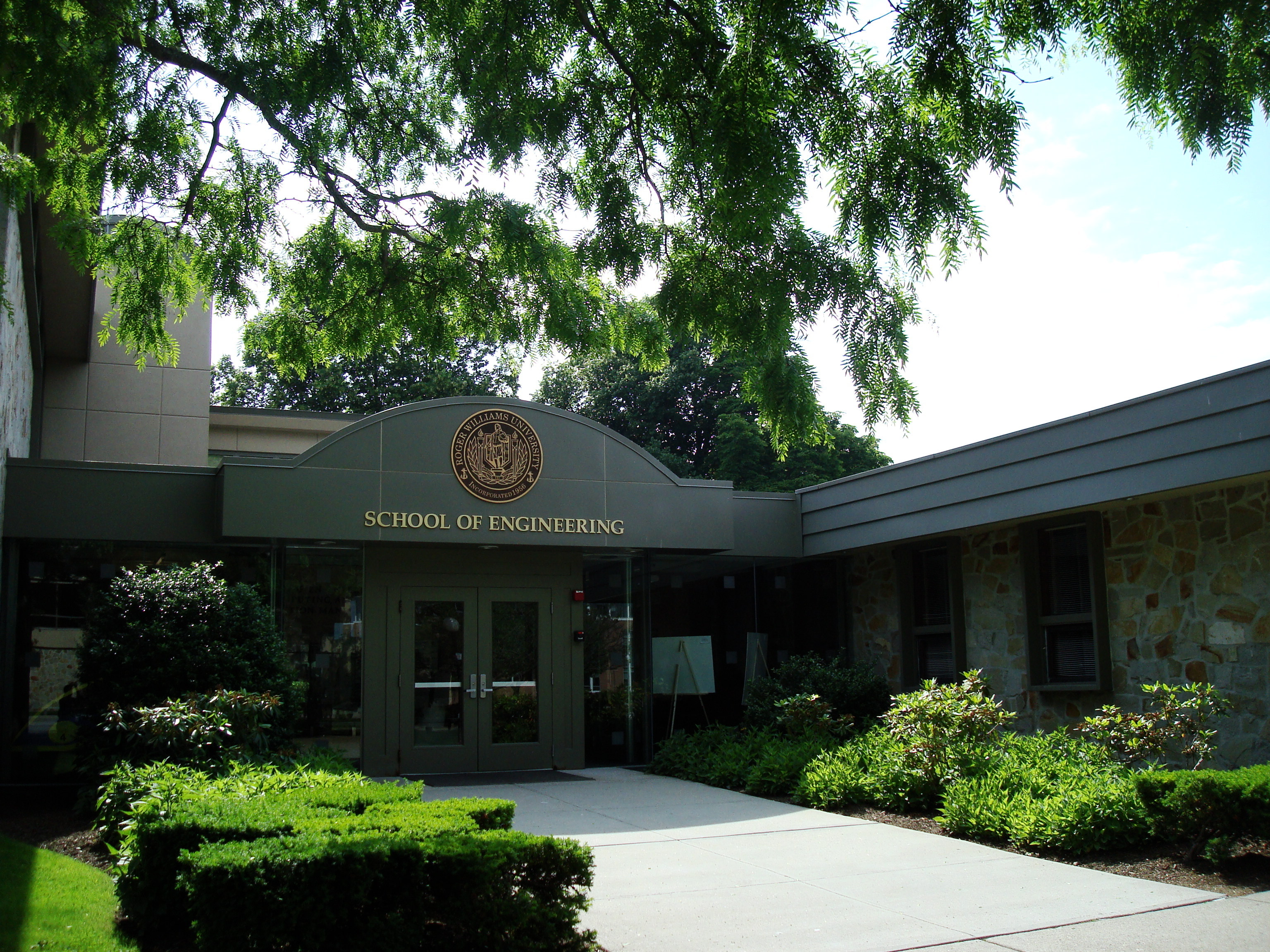
College of Engineering, Roger Williams University, Bristol, RI. 1967-69.

Lloyd Willington Kent (1907-1991) was an American architect from Providence, Rhode Island. With work based in modernist theory, Kent and his firms designed many Rhode Island civic buildings during the mid-twentieth century.

Lloyd W. Kent was born in Pawtucket, Rhode Island in 1907. He graduated from Dartmouth in 1929 and MIT in 1932, with additional training at Fontainebleau later that year. He worked for Hood & Fouilhoux in New York City and Edwin E. Cull in Providence, before opening his own office in Providence in 1937.

In 1938 it became Kent & Aldrich with the addition of David Aldrich. In 1939 another partner was added, William F. Cruise. The partnership would remain the same until 1946, when Philip D. Creer, director of architecture at RISD, became partner. At the same time, engineer Arthur Mather, Jr. became partner, the firm then being Creer, Kent, Mather, Cruise & Aldrich. Mather left in 1953, when the partnership was reduced to Creer, Kent, Cruise & Aldrich. In 1956 Creer was selected as the head of the School of Architecture at the University of Texas at Austin. Despite this, Creer's business connections were maintained, and were not severed until 1959. Once again known as Kent, Cruise & Aldrich, the firm was maintained as such until 1962, when Aldrich left to practice independently. The firm was then known as Kent, Cruise & Associates until 1968, when it became Kent, Cruise & Partners. The firm survived at least until 1993.

== Architectural works ==
Kent & Aldrich, 1938-1939:

- 1939 - John J. Gilbert House (Remodeling), 200 Arlington Ave., Providence, Rhode Island. Originally built in 1901.

Kent, Cruise & Aldrich, 1939-1946:

- 1940 - King Clinic, 175 Harris Ave., Woonsocket, Rhode Island.

Creer, Kent, Mather, Cruise & Aldrich, 1946-1953:

- 1948 - Y. M. C. A. Building, 95 High St., Westerly, Rhode Island. Demolished.
- 1949 - Valley View, 11 West Dr., Providence, Rhode Island. The earliest of many projects for the Providence Housing Authority.
- 1950 - Admiral Terrace, Admiral & Fillmore Sts., Providence, Rhode Island. PHA project.
- 1950 - Codding Court, 142 Dodge St., Providence, Rhode Island. PHA project.
- 1951 - Hartford Park, 335 Hartford Ave., Providence, Rhode Island. PHA project. Partially demolished.
- 1951 - Y. M. C. A. Building (Lobby), 160 Broad St., Providence, Rhode Island.
- 1952 - Eden Park Elementary School, Oakland Ave., Cranston, Rhode Island.
- 1953 - Rhode Island Veterans Home, 480 Metacom Ave., Bristol, Rhode Island.

Creer, Kent, Cruise & Aldrich, 1953-1959:

- 1953 - Stadium Elementary School, Crescent Ave., Cranston, Rhode Island/
- 1954 - Park View Jr. High School, Park View Blvd., Cranston, Rhode Island.
- 1954 - Westerly Hospital (Major Additions), 25 Wells St., Westerly, Rhode Island.
- 1954 - Y. M. C. A. Building (Boys' Building), 160 Broad St., Providence, Rhode Island.
- 1955 - Church House for Barrington Congregational Church, 461 County Rd., Barrington, Rhode Island.
- 1956 - Dartmouth High School, Slocum Rd., Dartmouth, Massachusetts. Now the middle school.
- 1957 - Bristol Armory, 470 Metacom Ave., Bristol, Rhode Island.
- 1957 - Education/Recreation Center, Ladd School, Exeter, Rhode Island. Now occupied by the Job Corps and one of the few surviving buildings on campus.
- 1957 - Lower School Building, Lincoln School, Butler Ave., Providence, Rhode Island.
- 1958 - Hattie Ide Chaffee Home, 200 Wampanoag Trail, East Providence, Rhode Island.
- 1959 - Mary E. Fogarty Elementary School, Oxford St., Providence, Rhode Island.

Kent, Cruise & Aldrich, 1959-1962:

- 1960 - Perkins Hall, Brown University, Providence, Rhode Island. Built as Gardner Hall for Bryant College, which vacated its Providence campus in 1969.
- 1961 - Dexter Manor, 100 Broad St., Providence, Rhode Island. PHA project.

Kent, Cruise & Associates, 1962-1968:

- 1963 - Children's Cottages, Ladd School, Exeter, Rhode Island. Demolished.
- 1966 - Aldrich, Burnside, Coddington, Dorr, Ellery, and Hopkins Halls, University of Rhode Island, Kingston, Rhode Island. With Pietro Belluschi.
- 1967 - Roger Williams University, Old Ferry Rd., Bristol, Rhode Island.

Kent, Cruise & Partners, from 1968:

- 1968 - Mt. St. Joseph College, 4808 Tower Hill Rd., Wakefield, Rhode Island. Closed in 1975, the campus is currently occupied by the Oliver Stedman Government Center.
- 1969 - Brown University Office Building, 244 Thayer St., Providence, Rhode Island.
- 1972 - Chafee Social Service Center, University of Rhode Island, Kingston, Rhode Island.
- 1974 - Matunuck Elementary School, Matunuck Beach Rd., Matunuck, Rhode Island.
- 1974 - West Kingston Elementary School, Ministerial Rd., West Kingston, Rhode Island.
- 1976 - Charles V. Chapin Building (Dept. of Health Latoratory), 50 Orms St., Providence, Rhode Island.
