= Hallville Mill =

Hallville Mill may refer to:

- An historic textile mill whose ruins are included in the Hallville Historic and Archeological District in Exeter, Rhode Island
- An historic textile mill included in the Hallville Mill Historic District in Preston, Connecticut
