= Woonsocket Harris Public Library =

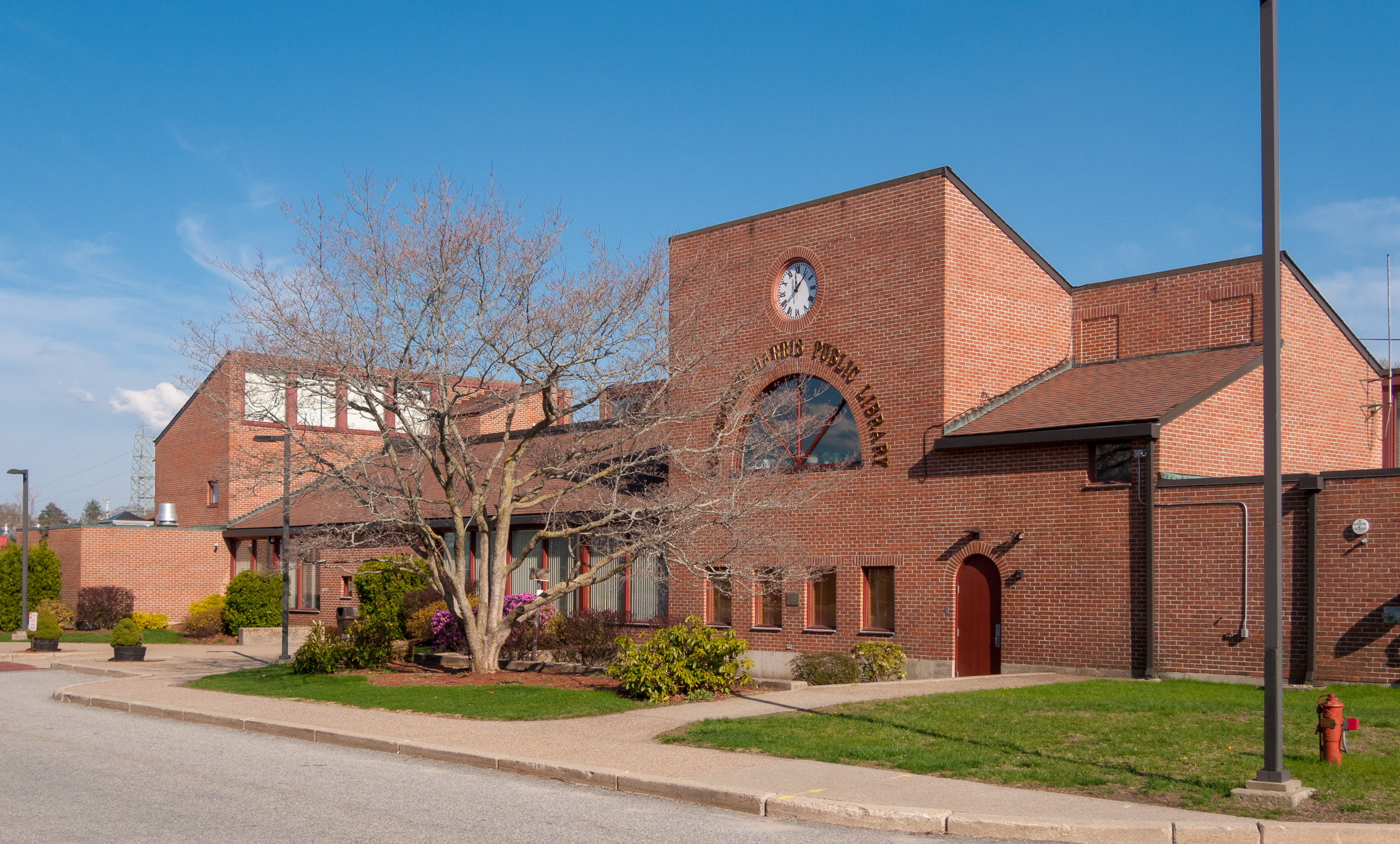
- 42.0054°N 71.5082°W
- Location: Woonsocket, Rhode Island, United States of America
- Type: Public Library
- Established: 1866
- Branches: 1

Other information
- Website: www.woonsocketlibrary.org

Woonsocket Harris Public Library is a public library at 303 Clinton Street in Woonsocket, Rhode Island. Founded in 1866, it is Rhode Island's second public library. Founded by Edward Harris, the library was originally housed at the Harris Institute, which also included an auditorium for traveling lectures. This building has been adapted for use as Woonsocket City Hall. Harris was a major wool manufacturer and abolitionist; he used some of his wealth for philanthropic projects in Woonsocket.

In 1974 the library moved to its current building, designed by Exeter architect William D. Warner; this was renovated in 2001.

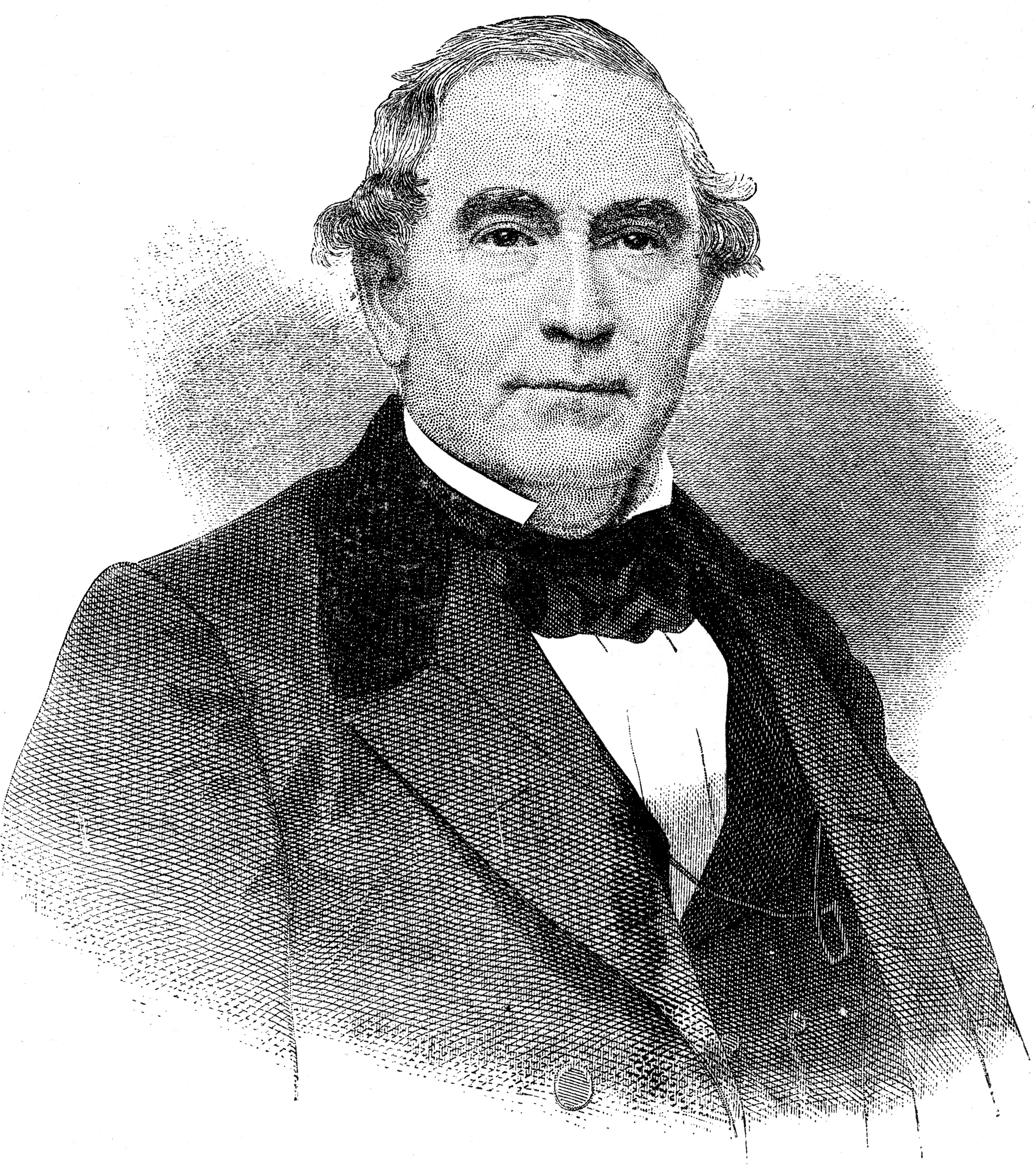
Edward Harris, founder of the Woonsocket Public Library

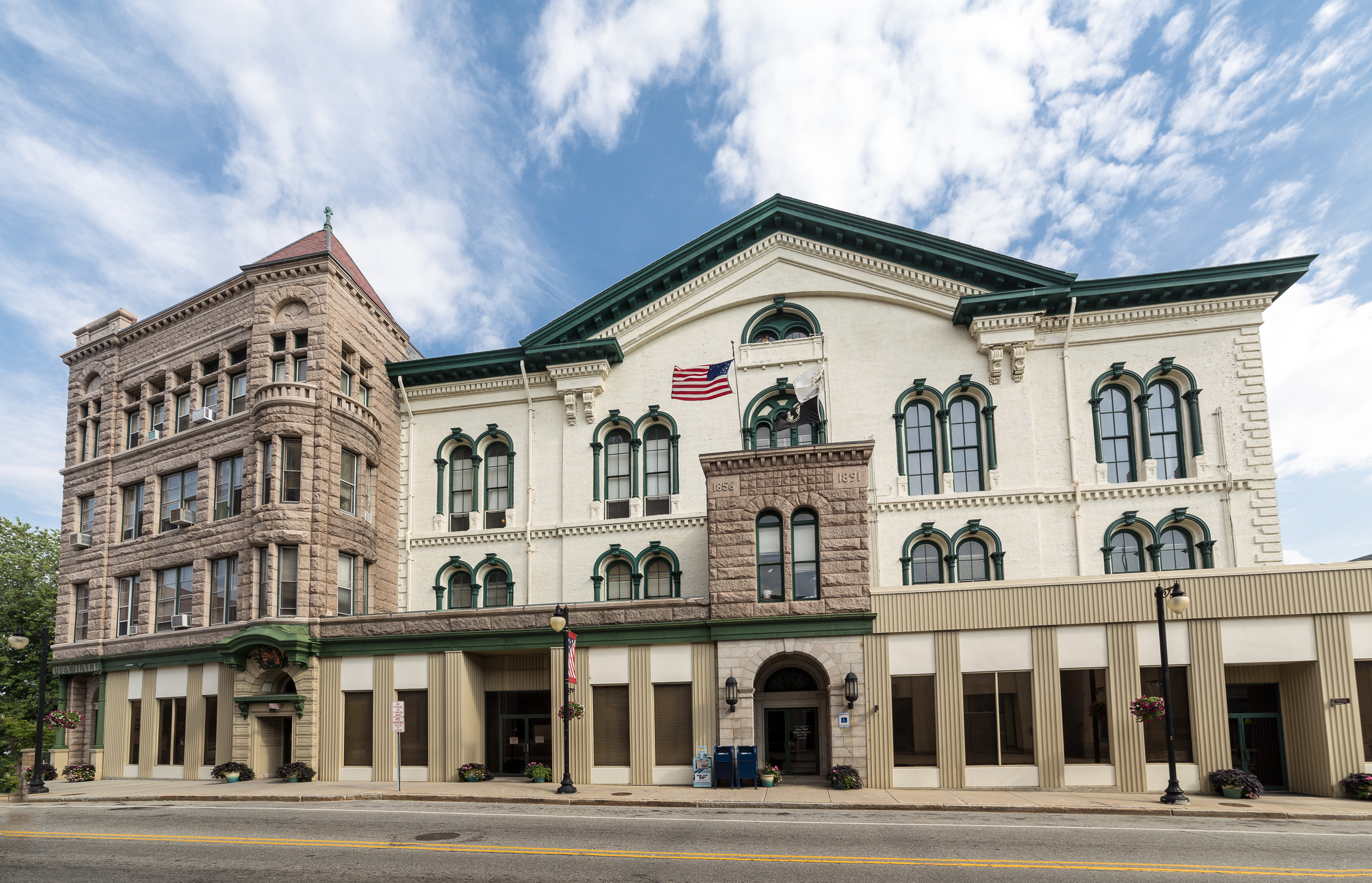
Original site of the Harris Library in the Harris Institute (now used as Woonsocket City Hall)

== See also ==
- List of libraries in Rhode Island
