= Ruth Tripp =

American composer, music critic, educator and pianist (1897–1971)

Ruth Erskine Tripp (December 26, 1897 – May 1971) was an American composer, music critic, educator, and pianist. She administered the Works Progress Administration's Federal Music Project (WPA FMP) in the state of Rhode Island from 1940 to 1943.

Tripp was born in Dighton, Massachusetts, to Everett E. and Martha Erskine Tripp. She had three sisters: Martha, Elsie, and Gertrude. In 1903 the family moved to Central Falls, Rhode Island.

Tripp graduated from the New England Conservatory of Music and studied music in France at the Conservatorie Fountainbleu (probably one of the Fontainebleau Schools) in 1922. Her teachers included May Atwood Anderson, Avis Bliven Charbonnel, and Ferdinand Motte-Lacroix.

Tripp taught music at the Gordon School, a private school in Providence, and later at the University of Rhode Island and Bryant College (today Bryant University). She was music critic for the Providence Journal-Bulletin for 27 years, and also worked as a church choir director and organist. She served as president of Rhode Island's Federation of Music Clubs, and received awards from the American Symphony Orchestra League (today the League of American Orchestras) and the Music Critics Association. Tripp also participated in Rhode Island's Chaminade Club.

Tripp's papers are archived at the Rhode Island Historical Society. She wrote a short story entitled The Jacknife. Her musical compositions include:

Chamber

- Bergerette (flute and strings)

Operetta

- Rabbit's Foot (lyrics by Grace Sherwood)
- Wedding of Miss Mary Krissmass and Mr. Sandy Claws (lyrics by Grace Sherwood)

Vocal

- "Christmas Folk Song" (text by Lizette Woodworth Reese)
- "Earth Bread"
- In the Days of Herod the King (three women's voices; text Matthew 11:1–11)
- Land Grant: A Free Choral Adaptation of Portions of the Morrill Act of 1862 (M) Ostrich (text by Charles Malam)
- "Rivals" (text by James Stephens; written for the 1948 Gordon School commencement)
- "Rhode Island Campaign Song"
- Same Country (strings, harp, and choir; text Luke II: 8–14)
- Songs of the Sea (with Grace Sherwood)
- "Solitary Place shall be Glad" (text Isaiah 35:1-2-10)
