= David Aldrich =

American painter (1907–2002)

- Born: November 4, 1907; Providence, Rhode Island
- Died: September 13, 2002 (aged 94); Little Compton, Newport County, Rhode Island, U.S.
- Education: Gordon School; Moses Brown School; Brown University; Columbia Graduate School of Architecture, Planning and Preservation; Rhode Island School of Design
- Known for: Painting
- Relatives: Chester Holmes Aldrich

David Aldrich (November 4, 1907 – September 13, 2002) was an American watercolor painter and architect from Rhode Island. The landscapes and cityscapes that he painted were not painted with literal realism but rather with freedom and spontaneity in an attempt to capture the essence of the scene.

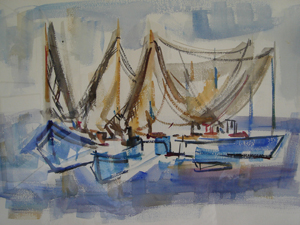
David Aldrich - Lesconil (1961)

== Early life ==
Born in 1907 to John Gladding Aldrich and Margaret Putnam Calder. Aldrich's love of art began in his childhood home in Providence, Rhode Island, where his parents both painted and were influential in the creation of the Providence Art Club. The family often took painting vacations to Glocester, Rhode Island and to Little Compton, Rhode Island where they painted with their good friends, the Burleighs (local artist Sydney Burleigh was known to Aldrich as Uncle Tid). Later the Aldriches traveled to Europe and the Caribbean, taking every opportunity to stop by the side of the road to paint when coming upon an inspiring view.

He attended and graduated from the Gordon School, the Moses Brown School. And then went on to college at Brown University, graduating in 1929 with a bachelor's degree in philosophy and Columbia Graduate School of Architecture, Planning and Preservation graduating in 1933 with a master's degree in architecture. During World War II he served in the Army Air Corps in North Africa and Iran, using his architectural training.

== Work ==
Aldrich's artistic career began as an architect in New York City, New York in 1933 with his uncle, Chester Holmes Aldrich, at Delano & Aldrich. After his time in New York, he spent two years in Washington DC at the US Treasury Department. In 1937 he became a partner in the architectural firm of Kent & Aldrich in Providence, RI. He later opened a private architectural firm and became the head city planner for the City of Providence.

He retained his interest in watercolor painting throughout his life, studying at the O'Hara School, the Positano Workshop, the Rhode Island School of Design and attending figure study classes every week at the Providence Art Club, where he was a life member. In the 1960s he was owner and director of Art Unlimited, a gallery on Thayer Street in Providence, Rhode Island that exhibited contemporary art from artists such as Hazel Belvo, Lawrence Kupferman, and Baburao Sadwelkar. Aldrich had numerous one-man exhibitions, notably at the Providence Art Club, the Rhode Island Watercolor Society, and the Gallery on the Commons in Little Compton, Rhode Island. He also exhibited in many group shows in those galleries as well as the Rhode Island School of Design Museum, Rhode Island Arts Festival, DeCordova Museum, Virginia Lynch Gallery, Wheeler Gallery and others. His work received many awards and is represented in numerous private and corporate collections. A watercolor he did of the Gordon School's campus still graces that school's diplomas. Up until his death he devoted himself entirely to his painting.

As one critic wrote: “His view is always fresh and unhackneyed, his brush is deft, his strokes swift and colors translucent and unmuddied – the paper often does the majority of the work…a sort of artistic shorthand that can make water color really exciting.” Aldrich said that his work was “an expression of the essence of my feelings toward the subject in color, line, and space.”
