= Gordon School =

Coordinates: 41.801054°N 71.372788°W

- East Providence, Rhode Island; United States

Information
- Type: Independent, Coeducational
- Established: 1910
- Head of School: Meredith deChabert
- Campus: Suburban
- Colors: Green and White
- Mascot: Gator
- Website: www.gordonschool.org

The Gordon School is a coeducational, independent school located in East Providence, Rhode Island. Students are educated from nursery through eighth grade. It is located on a 12-acre (49,000 m^{2}) site.

== History ==
The Gordon School was founded by Dr. Helen West Cooke in 1910 in her home in Providence’s East Side. It was the first coeducational independent school in Rhode Island.

The school relocated to its current campus in 1963. The 1963 campus was designed by William D. Warner, the architect that went on to create several high-profile area projects, including Providence's Waterplace Park and the iWay Bridge. The campus design includes woods, wetlands and gardens that accommodate year-round outdoor learning and allow students to grow their own food.

In 2018, Gordon abandoned the traditional financial aid model used by independent schools, replacing it with a system they called Family Individualized Tuition.

== Notable achievements ==
Since 2015, Gordon has finished in the top three in the annual statewide MathCounts competition, with four first place finishes as a team and four first place finishes for individuals.

Karan S. Takhar won the Rhode Island heat of both the 2003 and 2005 National Geographic bee and represented the state in the national finals. In 2016, the school champion finished 3rd in the Rhode Island GeoBee competition. In 2017, the Gordon School champion lost in the final round and placed 2nd in the state competition.

The Gordon School’s competitive robotics team won the Director's Award in the Rhode Island FIRST LEGO League competition, as well as a Young Environmentalist Award from Save the Bay in early 2006. In the 2006 World Festival in Atlanta, Georgia, against 80 teams from 15 countries, they finished second in the programming category.

Students' work with the pond and stream on campus, as well as nearby Narragansett Bay, has earned the school regional attention from environmental education groups. Along with the 2006 Save the Bay award mentioned above, the school also earned the Environment Council of Rhode Island's Loraine Tisdale Environmental Education Award in 2007. Other environmental education efforts include participation in International Coastal Cleanup Day.

Gordon's sledding hill is on the Boston Globe's list of seven "timeless" hills in Rhode Island.

== Notable alumni ==
- David Aldrich, artist and architect
- John Chafee, US Senator and Rhode Island Governor
- Jared Donaldson, professional tennis player
- Charlie Enright, sailor
- Mary Ann Lippitt, pilot, aviation business founder
- Nico Muhly, musician and composer
- Joan Nathan, American cookbook author and newspaper journalist
- Edward L. Widmer, American historian, writer, librarian, and musician

== Notable faculty ==
- Ruth Tripp, music
