= Job Kenyon =

American physician and politician

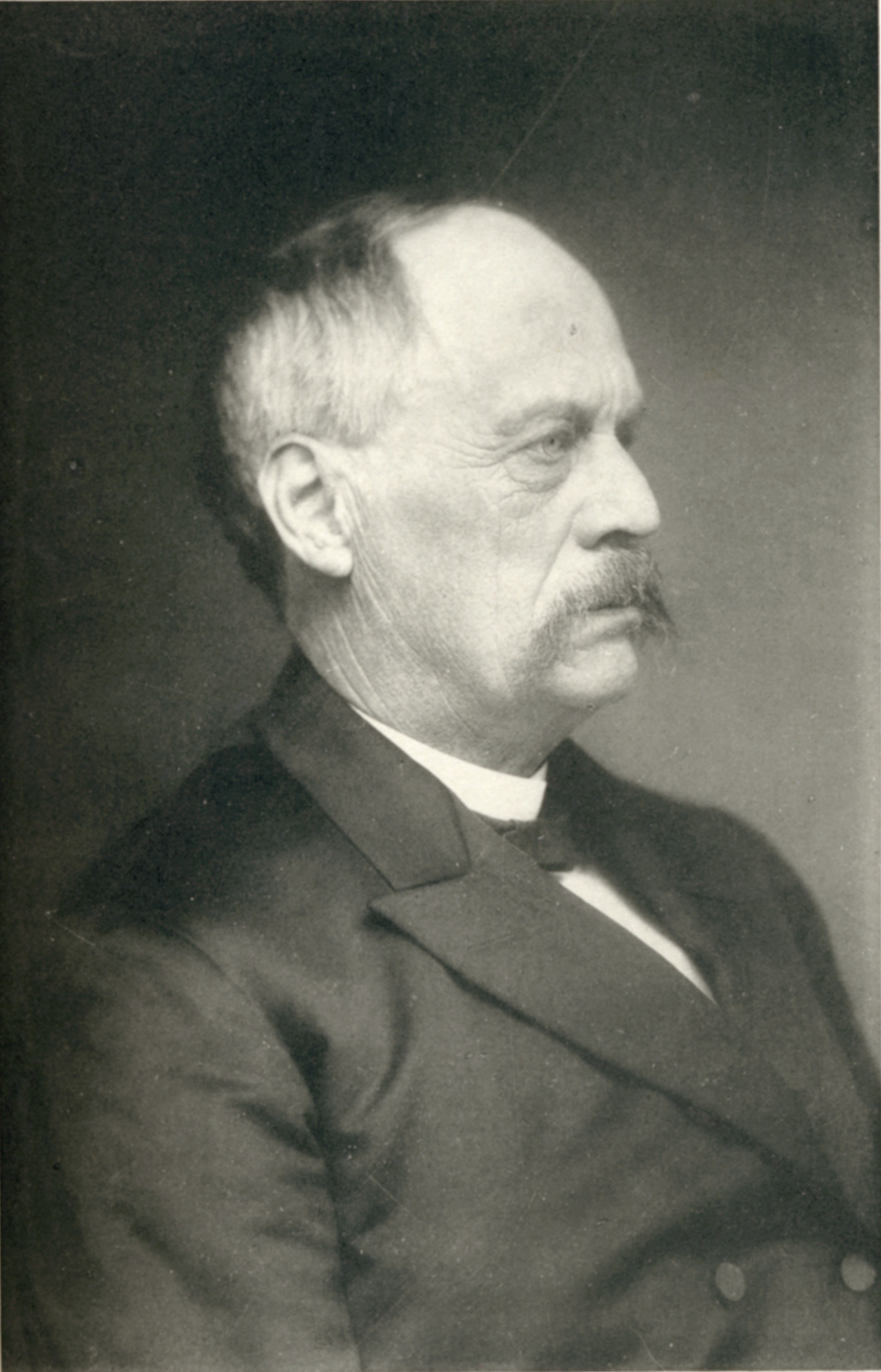
- Born: July 8, 1821; Exeter
- Died: August 5, 1889; Providence
- Education: Yale School of Medicine
- Occupations: Politician; medical doctor

Job Kenyon (July 8, 1821 – August 5, 1889) was an American medical doctor and politician.

Kenyon, son of Job and Elizabeth (Benjamins) Kenyon, was born in Exeter, Rhode Island, July 8, 1821. He entered Yale Medical School in 1844, after one year of medical study with Harvey Campbell, M.D., of Voluntown, Connecticut,—the township adjoining Exeter on the west. Immediately after graduation in 1846 he began the practice of his profession in the village of Carolina Mills, in Richmond, R.I., whence he removed in 1853 to Anthony, a post-village in Coventry in the same State. In September, 1862, he became Assistant Surgeon to the 3rd Regiment Rhode Island Heavy Artillery, then stationed at Hilton Head, S. C., but was obliged by ill health to leave the service in the following January. In 1864 he opened an office in Providence, which he maintained for the rest of his life, while still retaining his office and residence elsewhere. From 1865 to 1869 he held the position of physician to the U. S. Marine Hospital, then located in Providence. In 1869 he removed his residence to River Point, in the town of Warwick, R. I., where he remained until his death.

He was a member of the Rhode Island State Senate from 1865 to 1869, and again in 1874; during the former period he represented Coventry and in the latter Warwick. In 1871 he was appointed by Governor Seth Padelford a member of the Board of State Charities and Connections, which office he filled with great efficiency until his resignation in 1884. He was highly esteemed in his profession, and in 1882 and again in 1883 was elected to the presidency of the Rhode Island Medical Society.

He was attacked with apoplexy while attending to his practice in his Providence office, on the morning of August 5, 1889, and died later the same day.

He was married in April, 1854, to Phebe M., daughter of John Hoxie, of Richmond, R. I., who died in July, 1865. He was again married, January 22, 1885, to Sarah A., daughter of Joseph Sisson, of Warwick.
