= Yawgoo Valley =

Ski area in Rhode Island, United States

Coordinates: 41°31′01″N 71°31′46″W

Yawgoo Valley Ski & Sports Park
- Interactive map of Yawgoo Valley Ski & Sports Park
- Location: 160 Yawgoo Valley Road, Exeter, Rhode Island 02822 U.S.
- Nearest city: Providence, Rhode Island
- Top elevation: 310 ft (94 m)
- Base elevation: 70
- Skiable area: 36 acres (150,000 m^{2})
- Trails: 14
- Longest run: 2,200 ft (670 m)
- Lift system: 2 chairlifts 1 rope tow
- Terrain parks: 1
- Snowfall: 39 inches annually
- Snowmaking: All Trails
- Night skiing: Yes
- Website: yawgoo.com

Yawgoo Valley is the only surviving skiing resort in Rhode Island. It is located on a hill in Exeter, south of Providence and opened in the 1965–66 season as "Rhode Island's first chairlift served ski area."

As one of the southernmost ski areas in New England, Yawgoo relies heavily on artificial snowmaking. Lift tickets range from $28 on weekdays to $45 on weekends. Yawgoo valley also offers a snow-tubing park with eight lanes and two lifts.

The area's title as the first lift service area in RI was appropriate, as it opened at a time when chair service was not expected of any ski area. As a result, a large amount of skiers went to Yawgoo Valley instead of the four other RI ski areas, who all still relied on T-Bars only.

While Rhode Island's other four ski resorts would close over the next few years, Yawgoo Valley's use of two chairs and keeping up with more modern ski area technologies such as better snowmaking equipment kept them operational.

They also operate one of only six tubing parking in the entire Southern New England area (RI, CT, and MA) for additional revenue from both skiers and non-skiers.

== Trails ==
Yawgoo offers 14 skiing trails served by two chairlifts, snow tubing in the winter and, in the summer, a water park with 750 feet (230 m) of water slides. Because of its southern location, the trails are generally easier, including the four blacks (though they are still not for beginners), as they rarely face the extreme weather and temperatures the resorts further north do, and is also less steep since it has a very small vertical drop (compared to most, though not all, other mountains in New England).

Trail List:

Beginner: -Novice Area -Upper Hub's Folly -Upper Ledges -Crossroads -Down Under -Gnarnia -Learning Area

Intermediate: -Lower Hub's Folly -Yellow Jacket -North Forte

Advanced: -TNT -Lower Ledges -Outback -Jack Attack

Easier	More Difficult	Most Difficult	Most Difficult
7	3	4	0
