= The Ladd School =

Defunct school in Rhode Island, United States

Coordinates: 41.5539°N 71.5428°W

Information
- Established: 1908
- Closed: 1993

The Ladd School in Exeter, Rhode Island operated from 1908 to 1993 as a state institution to serve the needs of people with mental disabilities or developmental delays. It was closed largely due to the deinstitutionalization movement of the 1980s.

== The Rhode Island School for the Feeble-Minded ==
=== 1908–1920s ===
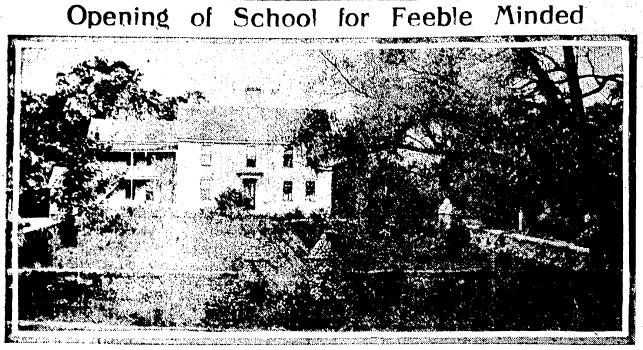
Opening of School for Feeble Minded. Providence Journal, 1908.

Founded in 1908, the Rhode Island School for the Feeble-Minded began as a small farm colony in rural Exeter, Rhode Island. It was a new kind of school, established on the basis of the experimental Templeton Colony annex of the Massachusetts School for the Feeble-Minded - the oldest public institution of its kind in the nation. While the formal purpose of the Templeton Colony and its Rhode Island counterpart was to train young people with disabilities in the application of farm work and mechanical trades, the institutions' forefather, Dr. Walter Fernald, was a famous eugenicist whose doctrine was to remove the feeble-minded from society in an effort to cleanse the nation's population of inferior and "defective" genes. This ideology would come to define the purpose of the school.

Fernald's protégé and chief administrator of the Templeton Colony, Dr. Joseph Ladd, was the school's first superintendent. An accomplished physician and classically educated pedagogue, his administration of the institution during its early development was considered by many to be a noteworthy contributor to the state's public welfare. However, as the years wore on, his reputation for mistreatment of the students grew. In 1916 he changed the name of the institution to Exeter School in order to abate public disapproval of the term "feeble-minded", and by the 1920s, the institution's entire character and purpose had become altogether something different.

Many states have already passed sterilization laws for eugenic purposes, and I hope Rhode Island won't stay behind much longer. Unless something is done to stop the propagation of the mentally deficient, we cannot expect the coming generations to be predominantly virile and sound in mind and body. In that case, a general deterioration of intelligence and the preponderance of inferior stock is inevitable, especially since the trend all along has been for smaller families in the higher grades of the population. Modern society circumvents nature's law of the survival of the fittest, but we mustn't go too far in allowing not only the survival but also the multiplication of the unfit.

— Dr. Joseph Ladd, "Dr. Ladd", Providence Journal (1948)

== The Exeter School ==
=== 1920s–1940s ===
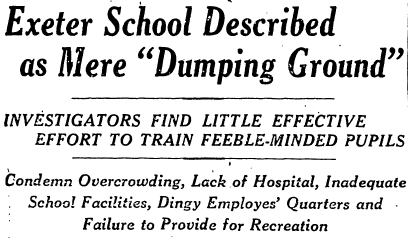
Exeter School Described as Mere "Dumping Ground." Providence Journal, 1928.

The school was criticized for overcrowding and inadequate care. It was described as a "dumping ground" and said that officials there had a "fatalistic attitude" with little effort being made toward deinstitutionalization. During the middle of the first half of the 20th century, the Exeter School did little to educate or train its growing population. To alleviate overcrowding, the school building was used mainly as living quarters for young children and wayward girls, while the dormitories were filled well beyond capacity. Adopting a purpose more characteristic of a custodial or penal institution, the Exeter School's policy became focused primarily on detaining people indefinitely as a means of segregating them from free society. This burgeoning practice was enacted upon individuals who committed petty crimes, or, in many cases, no crimes at all, especially toward women accused of immoral practices such as prostitution, sodomy, extramarital intercourse, and "illegitimate" pregnancy. A court commitment to Exeter was leveraged in countless cases as a means of eliminating the bloodline of entire families. Because compulsory sterilization was illegal in Rhode Island, most women sentenced under such pretenses were confined to Exeter until menopause or natural death, while a select few were sterilized nevertheless by willing surgeons who found ways to circumvent the law. In this way, until the end of World War II, the Exeter School's foremost function was that of a eugenics-era segregation facility.

=== 1940s–1950s ===
After decades of severe overcrowding, diminishing finances, and worsening living conditions, Ladd's administration of the Exeter School underwent a paradigm shift. Taking a stand against state government executors, in 1947, he discharged nearly one third of the Exeter School's population, then more than 900, attributing his decision to the institution's impending financial failure. Though effective in increasing financial support from the state, disavowing the Exeter School's role as a custodial institution for the immoral and criminally-inclined "defective delinquents" would prove impossible to achieve absolutely.

Over the course of the following decade, the institution continued to expand, constructing more buildings and fostering a growing population, with an increased emphasis on institutionalizing those with severe disabilities. Living conditions hardly improved.

With a larger population of younger and more severely disabled inmates, the Exeter School's shortage of qualified care-givers grew more acute. In 1955, the situation finally reached a head when a 20-year-old inmate - a lifelong state ward and court-committed defective delinquent - was implicated in the murder of a severely disabled child. The scandal signaled the end of an era, prompting Ladd's swift resignation.

== The Dr. Joseph H. Ladd School ==
=== 1950s–1970s ===
In 1956, Dr. John Smith, former director of education at the Connecticut Training School for the Feeble-Minded, was chosen as Dr. Ladd's successor, and, in a bid to again improve the institution's image, the Exeter School was renamed the Dr. Joseph H. Ladd School in 1958. With renewed enthusiasm, the institution underwent another series of growth spurts in subsequent years, bringing about the establishment of a new, modern school building, a state-of-the-art hospital, and a cluster of single-story cottages that would one day prove models of the modern group home.

Though aggressive public relations campaigns were routinely waged on television and in newspapers, Smith's administration throughout the 1960s and early 1970s was not without its share of troubles. Citizen-run advocacy groups began to take form, and employees took to the street picketing for higher wages and improved working conditions, while fierce bureaucratic conflicts erupted behind closed doors as Smith's political opponents tried time and again to oust him from office for mismanaging funds and abusing his executive authority.

=== 1970s–1994 ===
In November 1977, scandal erupted again when a State-appointed investigation into conditions at the Ladd School's hospital building reported an assortment of disturbing health violations at the dental clinic. The report was leaked to newspapers, and, in the days and weeks following, investigative journalists proceeded to uncover and report a multitude of health and human rights violations, including several patient deaths due to negligence and medical malpractice. The resulting onslaught of legal inquisition in the face of damning evidence would finally prove to be more than Smith's predominance could combat; in January, 1978, Governor J. Joseph Garrahy fired the doctor from office, and another era came to a close.

Though still not free of its troubles, the Ladd School's countenance in the 1980s was remarkably more tame than in any other decade. The dust had finally settled on a class action lawsuit filed against the State of Rhode Island after the dental scandal of 1977, ending with a court ruling that the institution adopt a wholesale revision of its policies and practices and reduce its population by half. Overseen by the institution's third and final appointed executive director, George Gunther, the institution's population continued to dwindle as the effort to reform the Ladd School gave rise to a number of public and private agencies for community care of developmentally disabled people. Over time, the deinstitutionalization movement gained enough momentum that in 1986, Governor Edward D. DiPrete announced the closing of the Ladd School. In 1993, the last few residents were relocated to alternative care facilities, and the institution closed down for good.

The 2015 supernatural thriller Exeter (released in the UK as The Asylum) was filmed on location at the abandoned Ladd School prior to the final four buildings being demolished in August 2013. The film's premise depicts a fictionalized attempt to renovate the property and partially details some of the real Ladd School's history.
