= Woonsocket City Hall =

- U.S. National Register of Historic Places
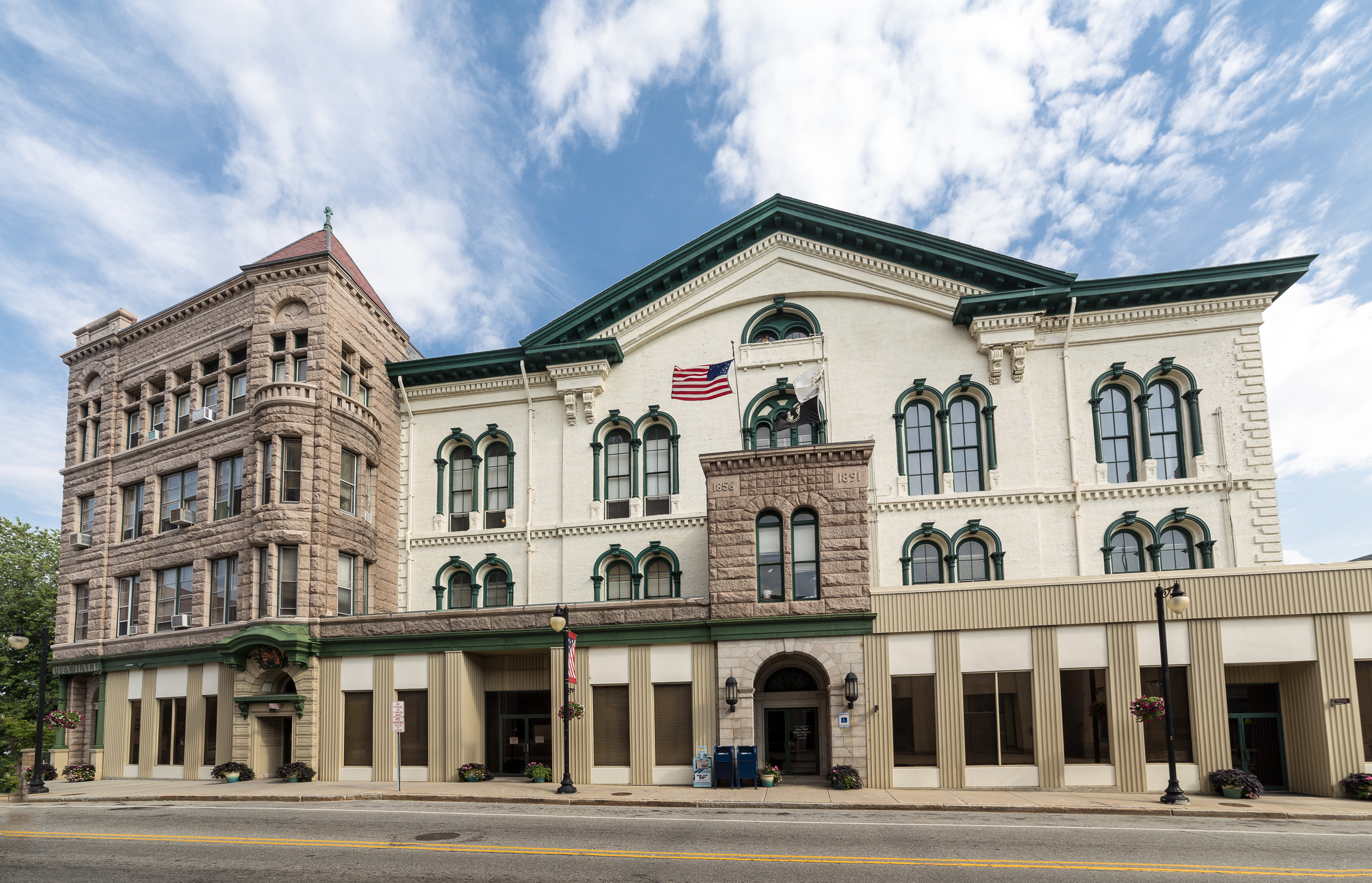

- Location within Rhode Island Location within the United States
- Location: 169 Main Street, Woonsocket, Rhode Island
- Coordinates: 42°0′8″N 71°30′53″W
- Built: 1856
- Built by: Albert B. Cole and Obadiah Slade (1856); Cutting & Bishop (1891)
- Architectural style: Italianate
- NRHP reference No.: 74000007
- Added to NRHP: May 1, 1974

The Woonsocket City Hall, (also known as the Harris Institute) is located in Woonsocket, Rhode Island.

Edward Harris, a leading Woonsocket industrialist, constructed the earliest part of the building in 1856, and it was known as the Harris Block, with stores on the first floor, and an auditorium hall seating 1,100 on the third floor. This brick structure has elements of Italianate styling, including round-arch windows and a heavily dentilled cornice. A major Richardsonian Romanesque addition, called the Granite Block, was made to the north of this structure in 1891. In 1902 the city purchased the building for use as city hall.

The builders of the original building were Albert B. Cole of Woonsocket and a Mr. Slade of Providence, probably Obadiah Slade, carpenter. The 1891 addition was built by Cutting & Bishop of Worcester. The architect of neither section is known.

The building served as the first public library in Rhode Island, housed on the second floor, which is now the Woonsocket Harris Public Library.

In March 1860 Abraham Lincoln spoke to a packed crowd in Harris Hall, which at the time contained one of the largest assembly rooms in the state.

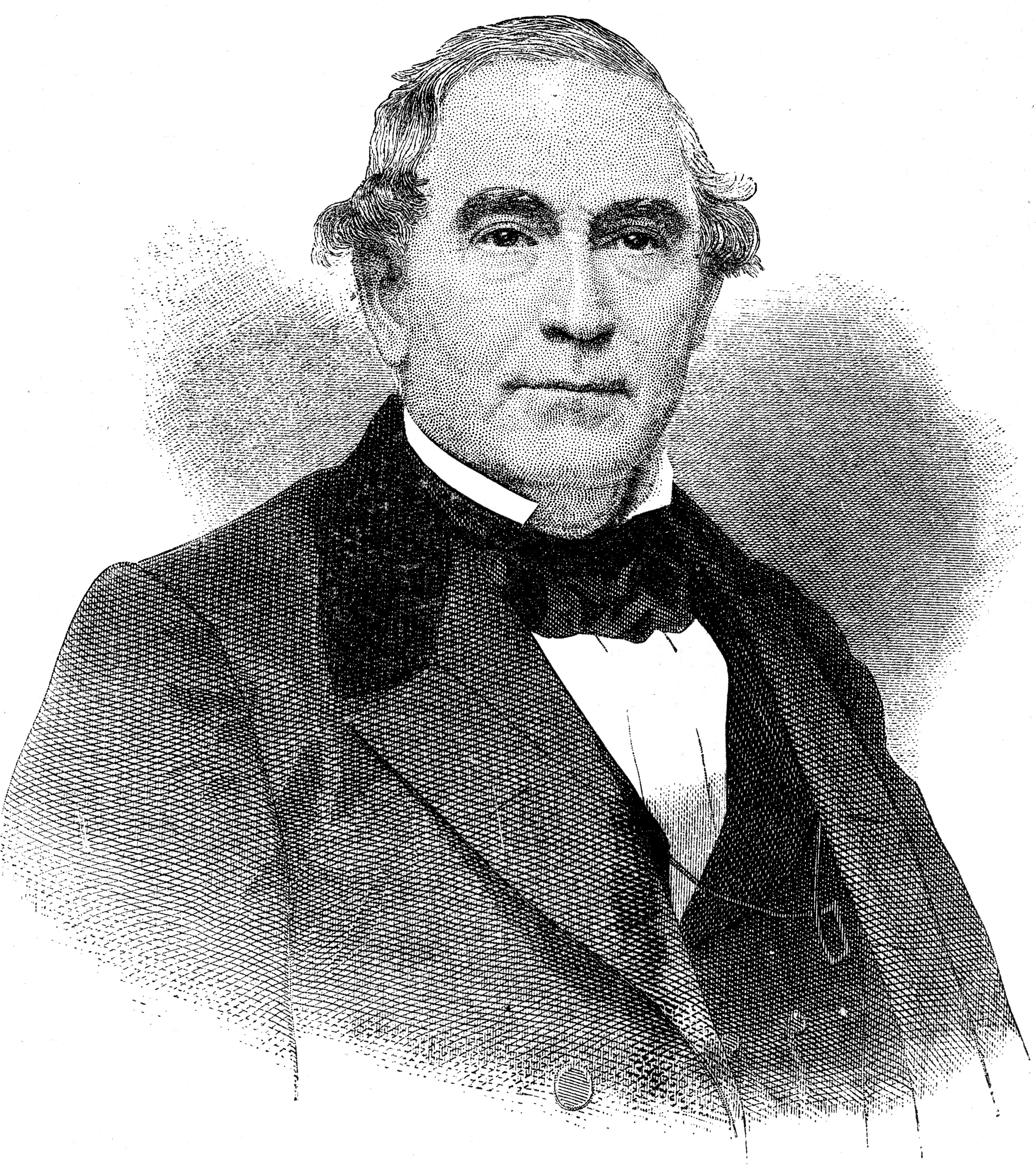
Edward Harris, founder of the Harris Institute, the first public library in Rhode Island

== See also ==
- National Register of Historic Places listings in Providence County, Rhode Island

== References and external links ==
- Erik Eckilson, "Woonsocket, My Town"
