= Simon Lillibridge Farm =

- U.S. National Register of Historic Places
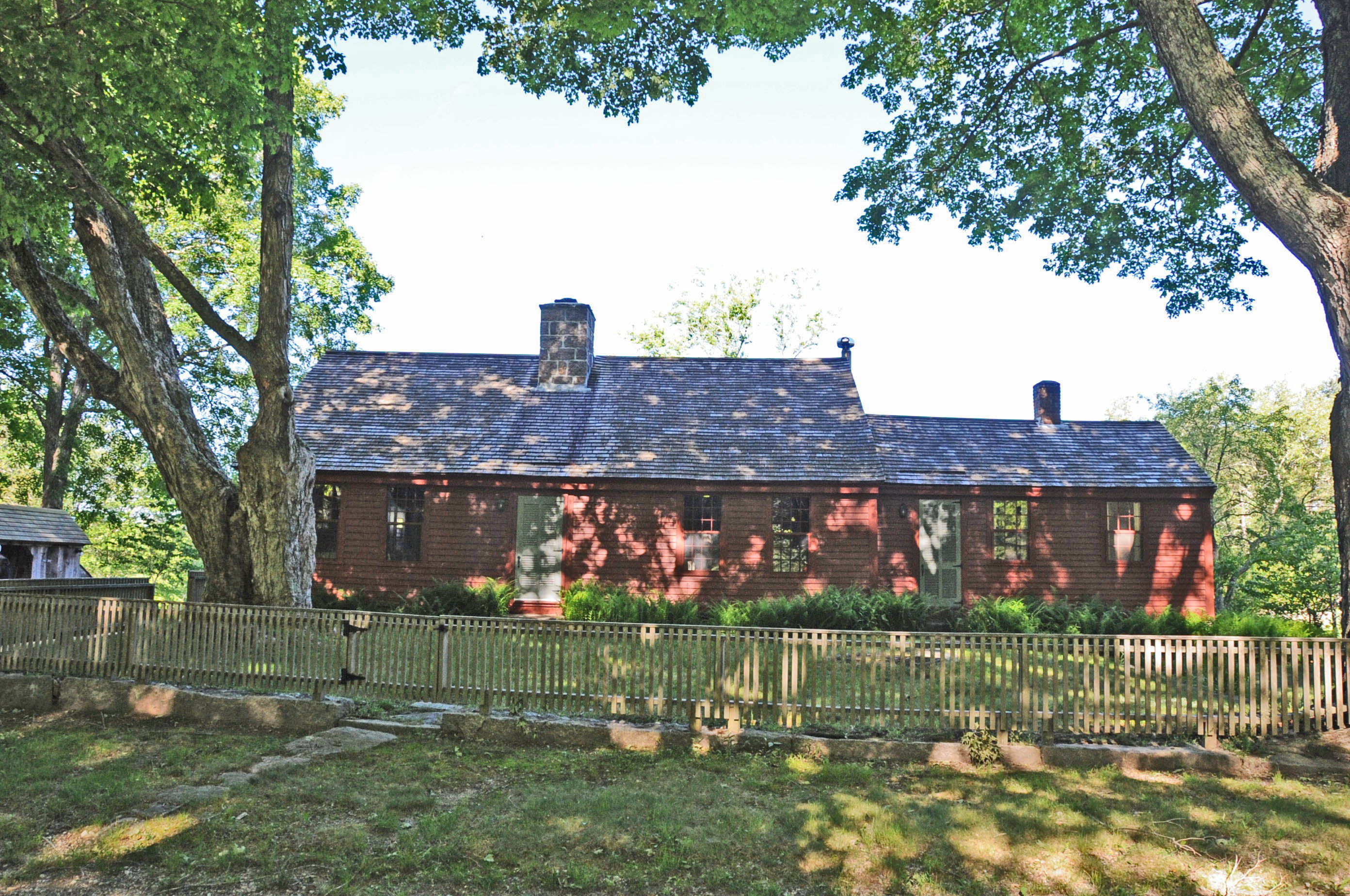

- Location within Rhode Island Location within the United States
- Location: Exeter, Rhode Island
- Coordinates: 41°34′16″N 71°42′47″W
- Area: 38 acres (15 ha)
- NRHP reference No.: 78000020
- Added to NRHP: November 28, 1978

The Simon Lillibridge Farm is an historic farm property at 75 Summit Road in Exeter, Rhode Island. The 38-acre (15 ha) property is all that remains of an original 200-acre (81 ha) parcel purchased by Simon Lillibridge in the 1810s. The main house, a two-story wood-frame structure, was either built by Lillibridge, or was already on the property when he bought it. Architectural analysis of the house suggests that at least portions of it were built in the 18th century, with hand-hewn (instead of later sawn) beams, and other stylistic elements suggesting construction during the Georgian period. The farm complex includes other 19th-century buildings, including a barn, shed, wagon shed, and outhouse, as well as a family cemetery. The property was in regular agricultural use until about 1935, and was used thereafter as a summer residence.

The property was added to the National Register of Historic Places in 1978.

== See also ==
- National Register of Historic Places listings in Washington County, Rhode Island
