= Fisherville Historic and Archeological District =

Historic district in Rhode Island, United States

- U.S. National Register of Historic Places
- U.S. Historic district
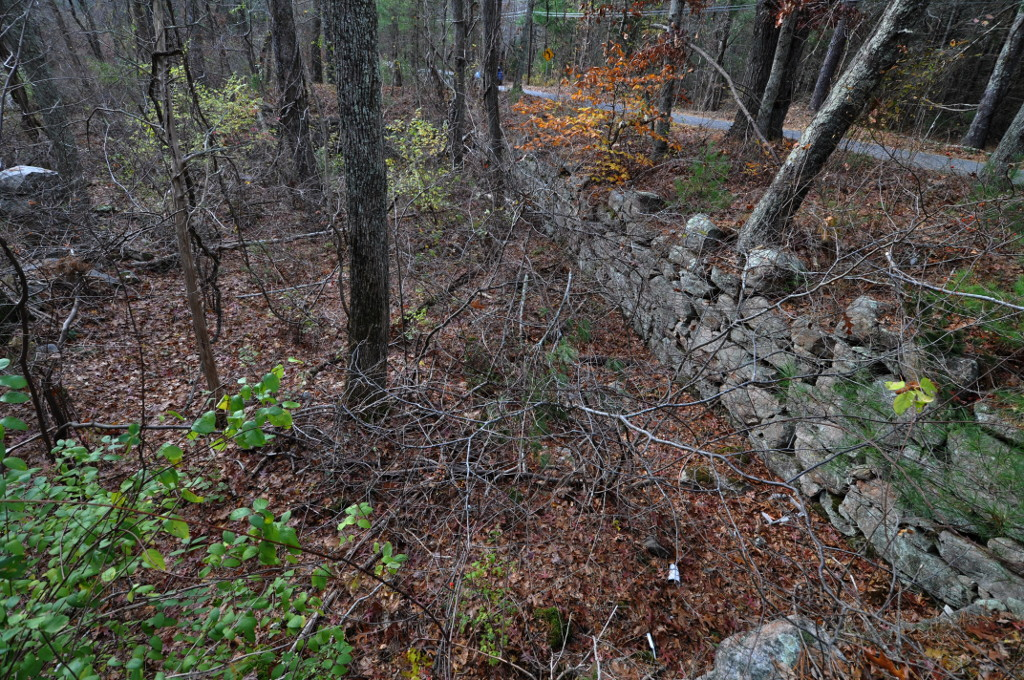

- Location within Rhode Island Location within the United States
- Location: Exeter, Rhode Island
- Coordinates: 41°33′52.7″N 71°33′44.0″W
- Area: 27 acres (11 ha)
- Architectural style: Greek Revival
- NRHP reference No.: 80000017
- Added to NRHP: December 5, 1980

The Fisherville Historic and Archeological District is a historic site in Exeter, Rhode Island. It is centered on Fisherville Brook in northeastern Exeter, around a mill complex that flourished in the mid-19th century. It includes the foundational remnants of a gristmill, sawmill, and included an abandoned early-19th century Cape style house at the time of its National Register nomination in 1980.

The site was listed on the National Register of Historic Places in 1980.

== See also ==
- National Register of Historic Places listings in Washington County, Rhode Island
