= Austin Farm Road Agricultural Area =

- U.S. National Register of Historic Places
- U.S. Historic district
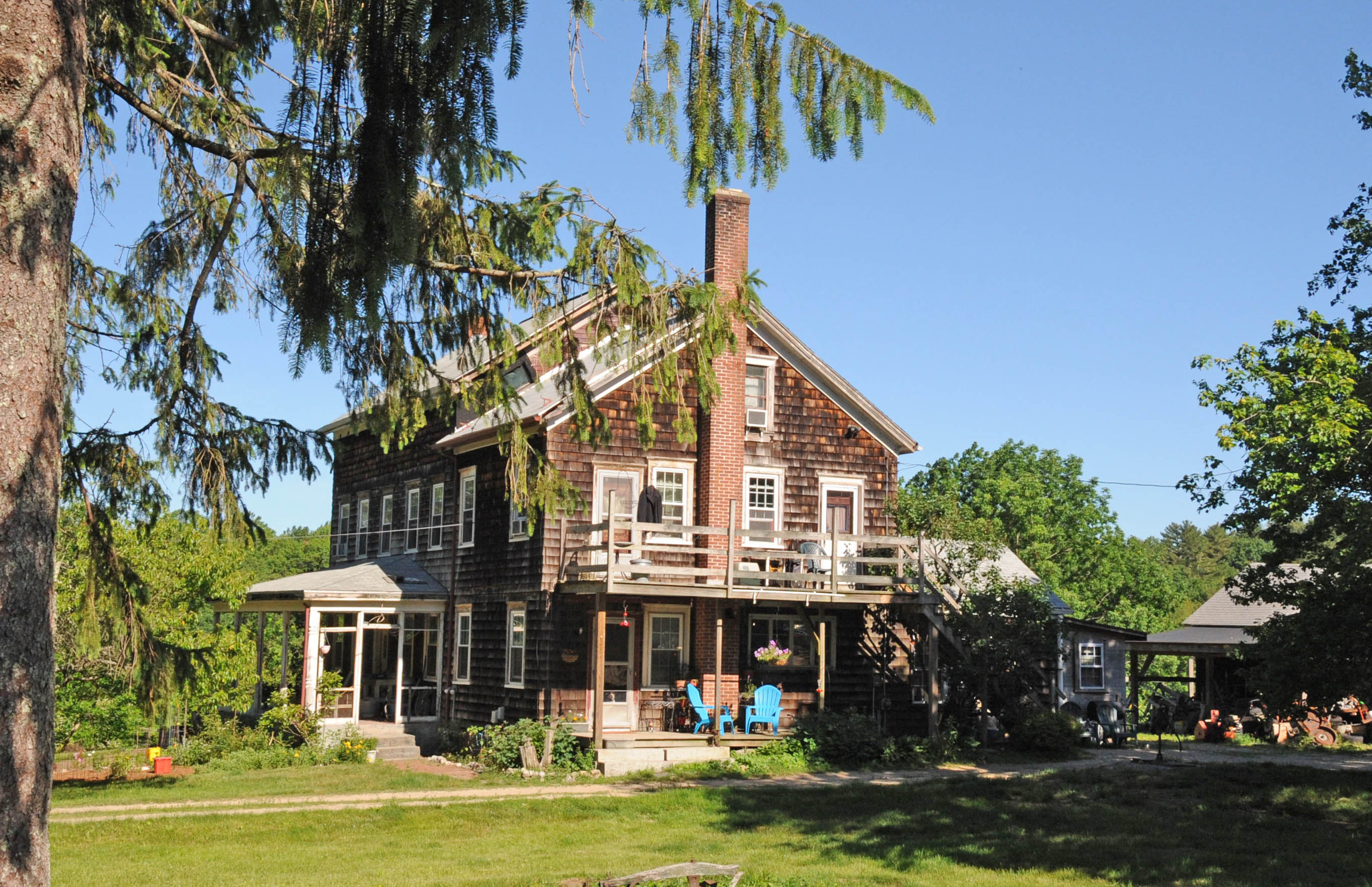

- Location within Rhode Island Location within the United States
- Nearest city: Exeter, Rhode Island
- Coordinates: 41°35′44″N 71°39′52″W
- Area: 105 acres (42 ha)
- NRHP reference No.: 77000009
- Added to NRHP: August 16, 1977

The Austin Farm Road Agricultural Area is a rural historic district in Exeter, Rhode Island. The district is bounded on the east by Interstate 95, on the north by the town line, on the south by Austin Farm Road, and on the west by a north-south line through Austin Farm Pond. This agricultural area is relatively little altered since the late 19th century, despite the proximity of the interstate. It includes the farm complex built up by John Austin in the 19th century, which continues to see active use, and the site of an older farm complex, reduced to just the farmhouse, which predates Austin's acquisition of the property. In addition to the farm buildings, it includes a chapel and school house built or maintained by Austin (in 1892 and 1860, respectively).

The area was added to the National Register of Historic Places in 1977.

== See also ==
- National Register of Historic Places listings in Washington County, Rhode Island
