= Parris Brook Historic and Archeological District =

Historic district in Rhode Island, United States

- U.S. National Register of Historic Places
- U.S. Historic district
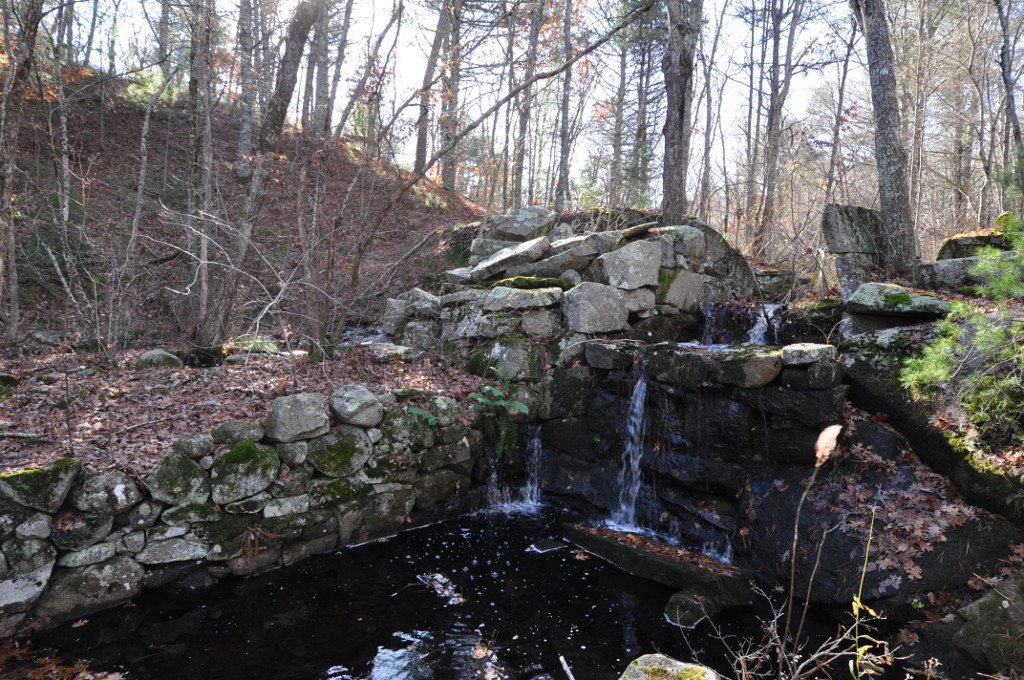
- Location: Exeter, Rhode Island
- NRHP reference No.: 80000023
- Added to NRHP: December 5, 1980

Parris Brook Historic and Archeological District is a historic district in Exeter, Rhode Island. The area includes remains of 18th- and 19th-century mill complexes, as well as prehistoric Native American rock shelters. It is mostly located in the Arcadia Management Area, a natural preserve managed by the state, and on adjacent private land.

The district was added to the National Register of Historic Places in 1980.

== See also ==
- National Register of Historic Places listings in Washington County, Rhode Island
