= Sodom Mill Historic and Archeological District =

Historic district in Rhode Island, United States

- U.S. National Register of Historic Places
- U.S. Historic district
- Nearest city: Exeter, Rhode Island
- Built: 1814
- NRHP reference No.: 80000025
- Added to NRHP: November 24, 1980

Sodom Mill Historic and Archeological District is a historic district in Exeter, Rhode Island. It includes the foundational remnants of a small early-19th century mill complex, including a dam and raceway, as well as the ruins of several 19th-century dwellings. The oldest mill on the site was built in 1814.

The district was added to the National Register of Historic Places in 1980.

== See also ==
- National Register of Historic Places listings in Washington County, Rhode Island
