= Hallville Historic and Archeological District =

Historic district in Rhode Island, United States

- U.S. National Register of Historic Places
- U.S. Historic district
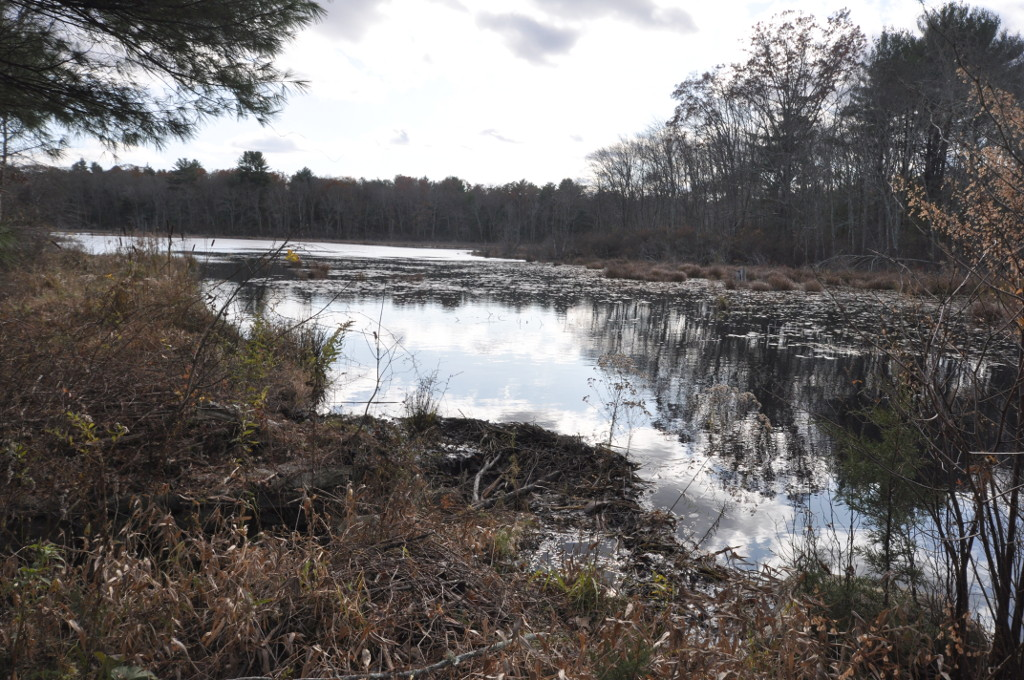
- The Hallville mill pond
- Location: Exeter, Rhode Island
- NRHP reference No.: 80000020
- Added to NRHP: December 5, 1980

Hallville Historic and Archaeological District is a historic district in Exeter, Rhode Island.

The historic district contains the remains of 19th-century textile mills and associated structures. The only standing structure in the district is a late 18th-century house at 239 Hallville Rd. The home is known as the Dawley House, for John C. Dawley, a mill owner who once lived there. The district was added to the National Register of Historic Places on December 5, 1980.

== See also ==
- National Register of Historic Places listings in Washington County, Rhode Island
