= Lawton's Mill =

- U.S. National Register of Historic Places
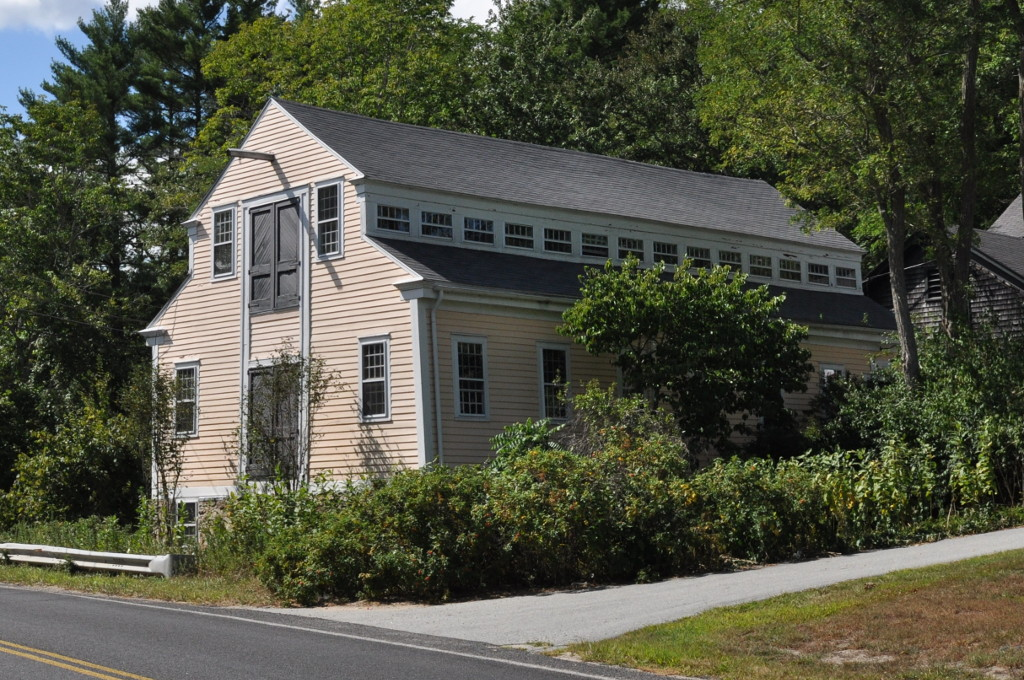
- The main mill building

- Location within Rhode Island Location within the United States
- Location: Ten Rod Rd., Exeter, Rhode Island
- Coordinates: 41°34′54″N 71°34′13″W
- Area: 5 acres (2.0 ha)
- Built: 1915
- NRHP reference No.: 80000022
- Added to NRHP: June 27, 1980

Lawton's Mill (also known as the Albro Mill) is a historic mill located on Ten Rod Road in Exeter, Rhode Island. The mill property includes an 18th-century house, an early 19th-century wood-frame mill building, and a 19th-century barn with early 20th-century additions. Also surviving from the period of the mill's activity are dams and waterways associated with it, including a dam and raceway extending several hundred feet north of the mill building. The mill building, which was built c. 1820, is one of a very small number of mill buildings to survive from the period in Rhode Island.

The mill was added to the National Register of Historic Places on June 27, 1980.

== See also ==
- National Register of Historic Places listings in Washington County, Rhode Island
