= Exeter, Rhode Island =

- Town
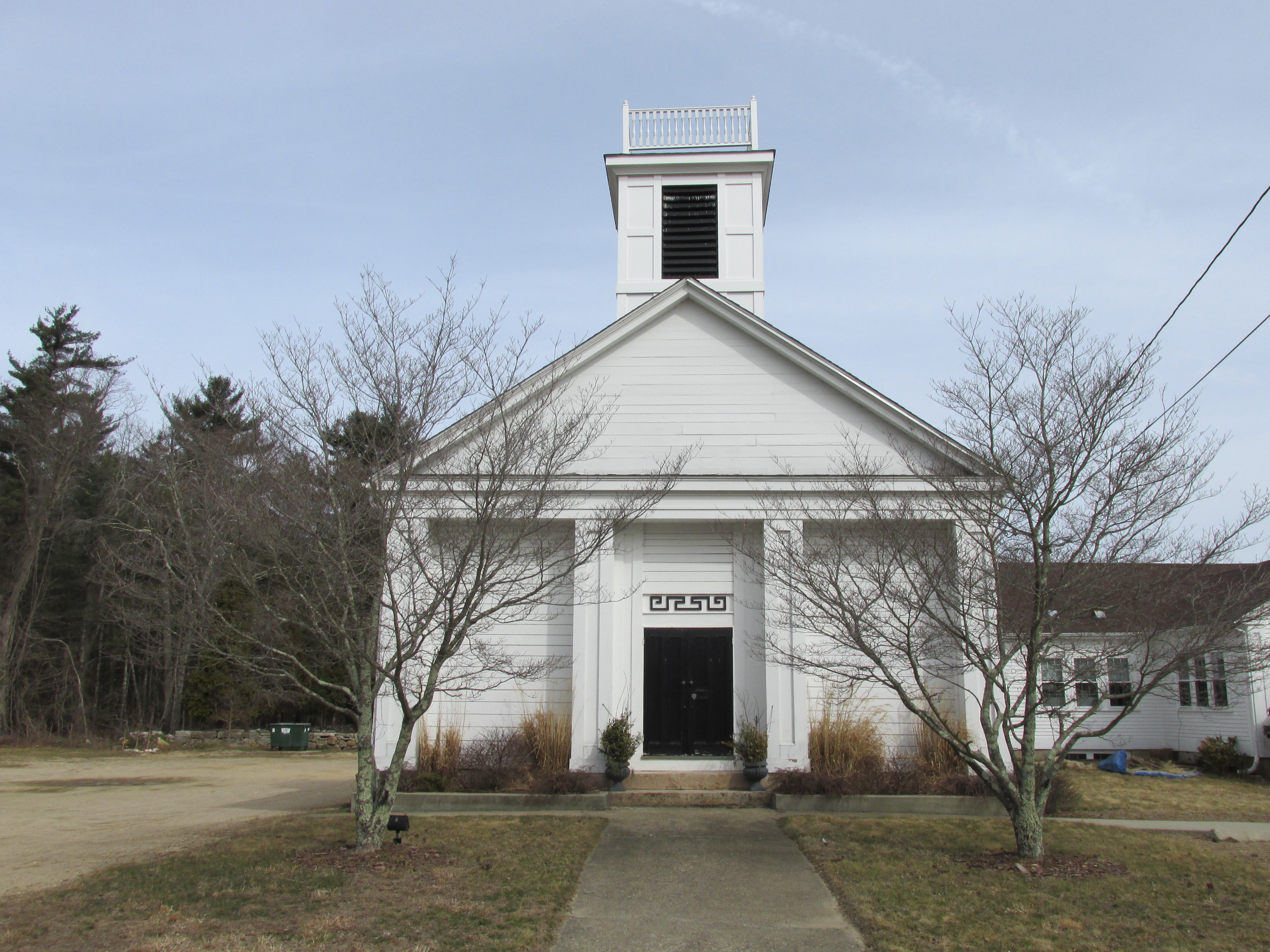
- Chestnut Hill Baptist Church

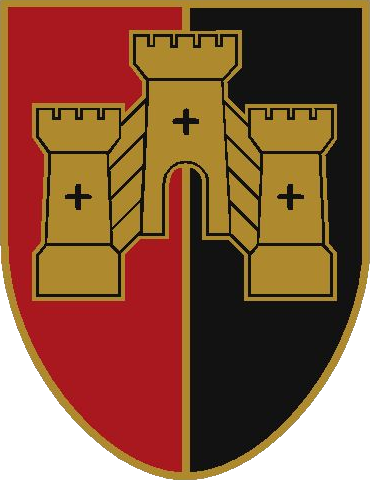
- Coat of arms

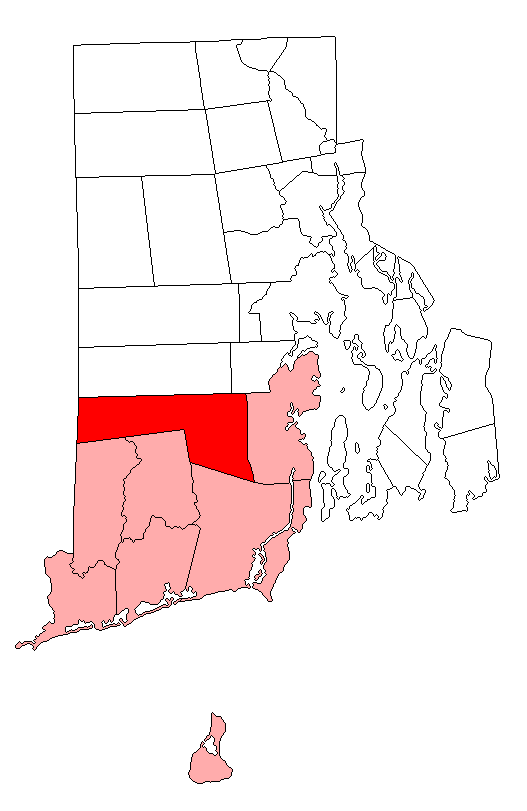
- Location of Exeter in Washington County, Rhode Island
- Coordinates: 41°34′N 71°36′W
- Country: United States
- State: Rhode Island
- County: Washington

Government
  - Town Moderator: Peter V. Lacouture
  - Town Council: Daniel Patterson, Michael Lefebvre, Calvin Ellis, Olivia DeFrancesco, Francis Maher
  - Town Clerk: Lynn M. Hawkins

Area
  - Total: 58.4 sq mi (151.2 km^{2})
  - Land: 57.7 sq mi (149.5 km^{2})
  - Water: 0.66 sq mi (1.7 km^{2})
- Elevation: 190 ft (58 m)

Population (2020)
  - Total: 6,460
  - Density: 112/sq mi (43.2/km^{2})
- Time zone: UTC−5 (Eastern (EST))
  - Summer (DST): UTC−4 (EDT)
- ZIP code: 02822 (Exeter), 02874 (Saunderstown), 02892 (West Kingston)
- Area code: 401
- FIPS code: 44-25300
- GNIS feature ID: 1220087
- Website: www.exeterri.gov

Exeter is a town in Washington County, Rhode Island, United States. Exeter extends east from the Connecticut border to the town of North Kingstown. It is bordered to the north by West Greenwich and East Greenwich, and to the south by Hopkinton, Richmond, and South Kingstown. Exeter's postal code is 02822, although small parts of the town have the mailing address West Kingston (02892) or Saunderstown (02874). The population was 6,460 at the 2020 census.

== History ==
Native Americans lived in the town prior to King Philip's War, and Wawaloam, a female Narragansett/Nipmuc leader lived in the town in the 1660s. The town of Exeter was formed in 1742 from the western part of North Kingstown. The name Exeter derives from the county town and cathedral city of Exeter in Devon, England. Numerous other places have also been given the name. Exeter is noted by folklorists as the site of one of the best documented examples of vampire exhumation: the Mercy Brown Vampire Incident of 1892.

== Geography ==
According to the United States Census Bureau, the town has a total area of 58.4 square miles (151 km^{2}), of which 57.7 square miles (149 km^{2}) is land and 0.7 square miles (1.8 km^{2}) (1.15%) is water.

== Demographics ==
Historical population
Census	Pop.	Note	%±
1790	2,495		—
1800	2,476		−0.8%
1810	2,256		−8.9%
1820	2,581		14.4%
1830	2,883		11.7%
1840	1,776		−38.4%
1850	1,634		−8.0%
1860	1,741		6.5%
1870	1,462		−16.0%
1880	1,310		−10.4%
1890	964		−26.4%
1900	841		−12.8%
1910	778		−7.5%
1920	1,033		32.8%
1930	1,314		27.2%
1940	1,790		36.2%
1950	1,870		4.5%
1960	2,298		22.9%
1970	3,245		41.2%
1980	4,453		37.2%
1990	5,461		22.6%
2000	6,045		10.7%
2010	6,425		6.3%
2020	6,460		0.5%
U.S. Decennial Census

As of the census of 2020, there were 6,460 people and 2,339 households in the town. The population density was 112.4 inhabitants per square mile (43.4/km^{2}). There were 2,647 housing units in the town. The racial makeup of the town was 92.03% White, 0.40% African American, 0.36% Native American, 1.08% Asian, 0.02% Pacific Islander, 1.28% from other races, and 4.83% from two or more races. Hispanic or Latino of any race were 2.91% of the population.

There were 2,339 households, out of which 29.3% had children under the age of 18 living with them, 53.6% were married couples living together, 19.0% had a female householder with no spouse present, and 19.0% had a male householder with no spouse present. 18.4% of all households were made up of individuals, and 5.6% had someone living alone who was 65 years of age or older. The average household size was 2.82 and the average family size was 3.38.

In the town, the population was spread out, with 18.3% under the age of 18, 16.3% from 18 to 24, 23.5% from 25 to 44, 24.1% from 45 to 64, and 17.8% who were 65 years of age or older. The median age was 38 years.

The median income for a household in the town was $99,236, and the median income for a family was $126,554. The per capita income for the town was $44,096. About 10.4% of the population was below the poverty line, including 8.0% of those under age 18 and 4.4% of those age 65 or over.

== Government ==
The town government is directed by a 5-member town council that is headed by a council president. For the purpose of school administration, Exeter is a member town of the Exeter-West Greenwich Regional School District along with the neighboring town of West Greenwich.

== Attractions and National Historic Places in Exeter ==
- Yawgoo Valley is the only ski resort in Rhode Island.
- Austin Farm Road Agricultural Area
- Baptist Church in Exeter
- Fisherville Historic and Archeological District
- Hallville Historic and Archeological District
- Lawton's Mill
- Simon Lillibridge Farm
- Parris Brook Historic and Archeological District
- Queen's Fort
- Sodom Mill Historic and Archeological District
- Tomaquag Museum, only solely Native American museum in Rhode Island

== Notable people ==
- George Wait Babcock, privateer
- Job Kenyon, politician
