= Susan Resneck Pierce =

American academic administrator

President of the University of Puget Sound
- In office 1992–2003
- Preceded by: Philip Phibbs
- Succeeded by: Ronald R. Thomas

Personal details
- Born: Susan Dale Resneck; 1943 (age 82–83)
- Education: Wellesley College; University of Chicago; University of Wisconsin–Madison

Susan Resneck Pierce (born 1943) is an American academic administrator who served as president of the University of Puget Sound from 1992 to 2003.

== Life ==
Susan Dale Resneck was born in 1943. She earned a bachelor's degree from Wellesley College in 1965. She completed an M.A. in English from the University of Chicago in 1966. Pierce earned a Ph.D. in English from the University of Wisconsin–Madison in 1972. She is a member of Phi Beta Kappa. Her dissertation was titled, "And by Bergson, Obviously": Faulkner's The Sound and the Fury, As I Lay Dying, and Absalom, Absalom, from a Bergsonian Perspective.

Pierce was chair of the English department at Ithaca College. She served as an assistant director of the National Endowment for the Humanities' Division of Education Programs. From 1984 to 1990, Pierce was dean of the College of Arts and Sciences at the University of Tulsa. She was the vice president for academic affairs at Lewis & Clark College from 1990 to 1992. Pierce served as president of the University of Puget Sound from 1992 to 2003. She founded and serves as president of SRP Consulting, LLC. She was president of the Boca Raton Community Hospital Foundation from 2004 to 2005.

Pierce resides in Boca Raton, Florida.

== Selected works ==
- Parr, Susan Resneck (1982). The Moral of the Story: Literature, Values, and American Education. Teachers College Press. ISBN 978-0807727164.
- Pierce, Susan R. (2011). On Being Presidential: A Guide for College and University Leaders. John Wiley & Sons. ISBN 978-1-118-02776-9.
- Pierce, Susan R. (2014). Governance Reconsidered: How Boards, Presidents, Administrators, and Faculty Can Help Their Colleges Thrive. John Wiley & Sons. ISBN 978-1-118-73849-8.
