= Edwin Randall =

Edwin Randall may refer to:

- Edwin M. Randall (1822–1895), Florida lawyer and Republican politician
- Edwin M. Randall Jr., American Methodist minister
- Edwin J. Randall (1869–1962), bishop of the Episcopal Church
