= Silas E. Nelsen =

American architect

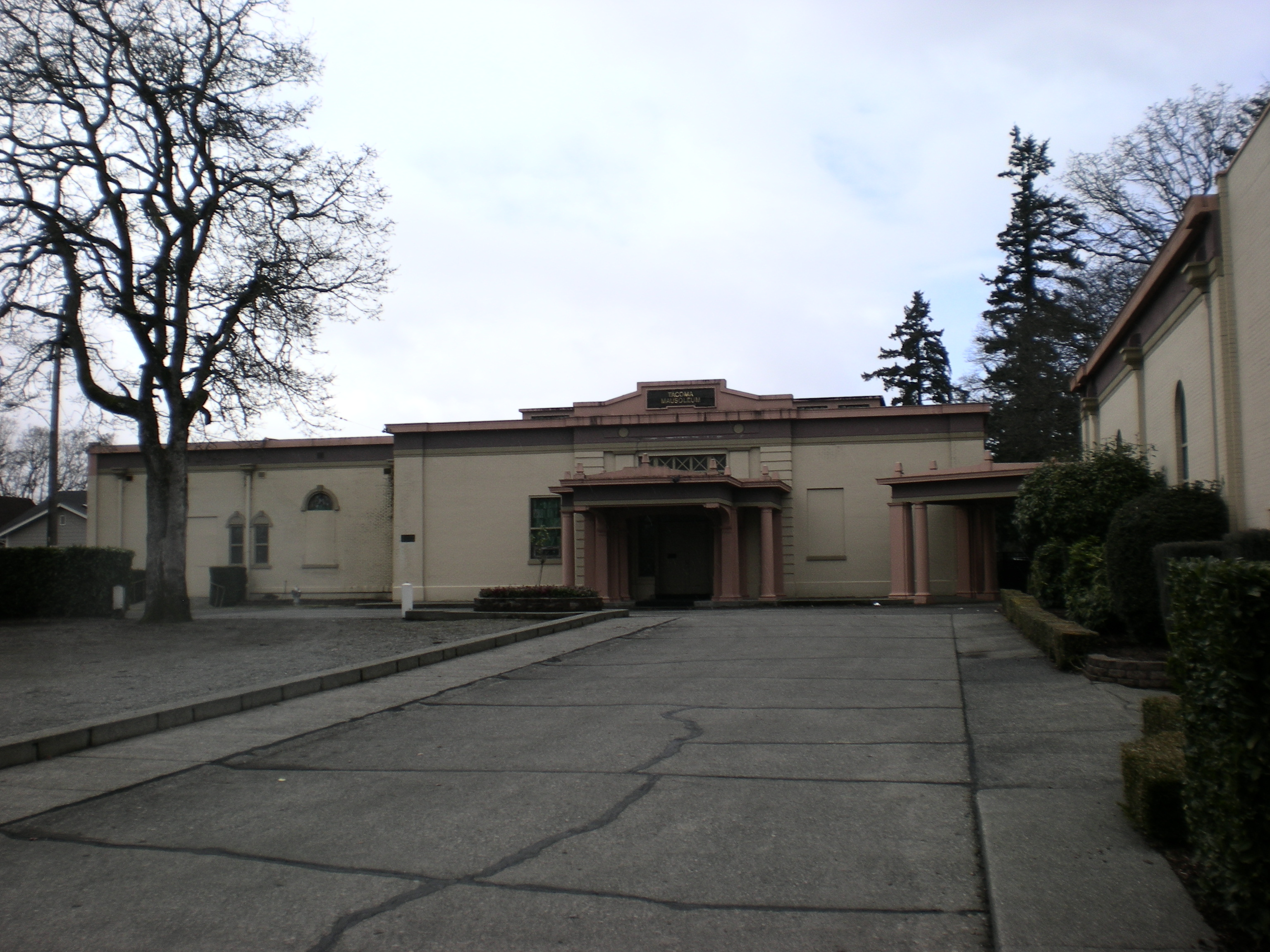
Silas E. Nelsen and George Gove were architects for the Tacoma Mausoleum

Silas Edward Nelsen (July 18, 1894 – September 27, 1987) was an American architect. He worked for the Tacoma, Washington firm of Heath, Gove, and Bell (see Frederick Heath (architect)) for five years until 1917 when he started his own firm. He designed at least 15 churches, 150 residences, and some of the buildings on the University of Puget Sound campus, as well as designs for several libraries. He was also an architect for some commercial buildings.

Nelsen's works include the McCormick Branch Library and the Everell S. Collins Memorial Library at the University of Puget Sound. Nelsen and George Gove are credited as the architects for the Tacoma Mausoleum, which is historic landmark on the National Register of Historic Places.

He was a member of the American Institute of Architects.

== Background ==
Nelsen was the son of Hans Peter Nelsen (1867–1952) and Annette Peterson Nelsen (1869–1919), immigrants from Denmark and Sweden. He was born in "Stotten" (a likely misspelling of Stoughton, Wisconsin) and went to high school in Portland, Oregon. He did not have formal training in architecture when he went to work for Heath, Gove, and Bell, but was able to start his own firm five years later. His first known project was a Tudor style dwelling at 2420 N. Union Avenue in Tacoma and he followed it with other residential buildings in a "twentieth century period revival styles such as Tudor Revival and Colonial Revival". By the 1930s and 1940s his work became more modern and streamlined in character. He designed a remodeling project for a Sears, Roebuck & Co. Store (1936), designed Fire Station No. 2 and No. 5 (1935) in Tacoma, and after World War II, he "continued in the Moderne vein with such projects as the Mueller-Harkins Buick Dealership (1948), the Temple Baptist Church (1949), and the Johnson Candy Company Building (1949)." He also designed catalog homes for Better Homes and Gardens.

His projects from the 1950s and 1960s include the Grace Moore Library branch (1950) and Fern Hill Library (1950) branches of the Tacoma Public Library system, "an International Style addition to the main Tacoma library (1952), the Tacoma City Light Administration Building (1953), and a Student Center (1959)". His design for the Collins Library at UPS was completed in 1952. Nelsen was also a "coordinating architect for several fraternity buildings on the (University of Puget Sound (UPS)) campus (1961)".

== Libraries ==
Silas designed the Charlotte White Mottet Library (1930) for businessman Frederic Mottet, who "built up one of the greatest mercantile establishments in the Pacific Northwest, the Hunt and Mottet Company. He gave the library to Tacoma "in memory of his wife who was prominent in Tacoma's cultural and social life during the late 1880s" on a site "chosen because Mottet and his wife spent many hours riding in the McKinley Hill area." It was built for $9,800, including the land. It was constructed with whitewashed brick library, and styled after a French provincial cottage consistent with Mottet's French Huguenot ancestry. Additions and renovations were carried out in 1964, 1975 and 1989 to "expand the library, bring it up to code, and add a community meeting room."

== Works ==
- Azure Pool, 748 Market Street, Tacoma (1927)
- The Charlotte White Mottet Library (1930), 3523 East G Street Tacoma
- Tacoma Mausoleum
- Everell S. Collins Memorial Library on the University of Puget Sound campus in Tacoma, Washington (1954)
- McCormick Branch Library
- Mueller-Hawkins Buick Dealership (1948)
- Johnson Candy Co. Building (1949)
- Tacoma Library addition (1952)
- Central Seventh Day Adventist Church, Tacoma (1953)
- Tacoma City Light Administration Building, Tacoma (1953)
