= Wilmot G. Whitfield =

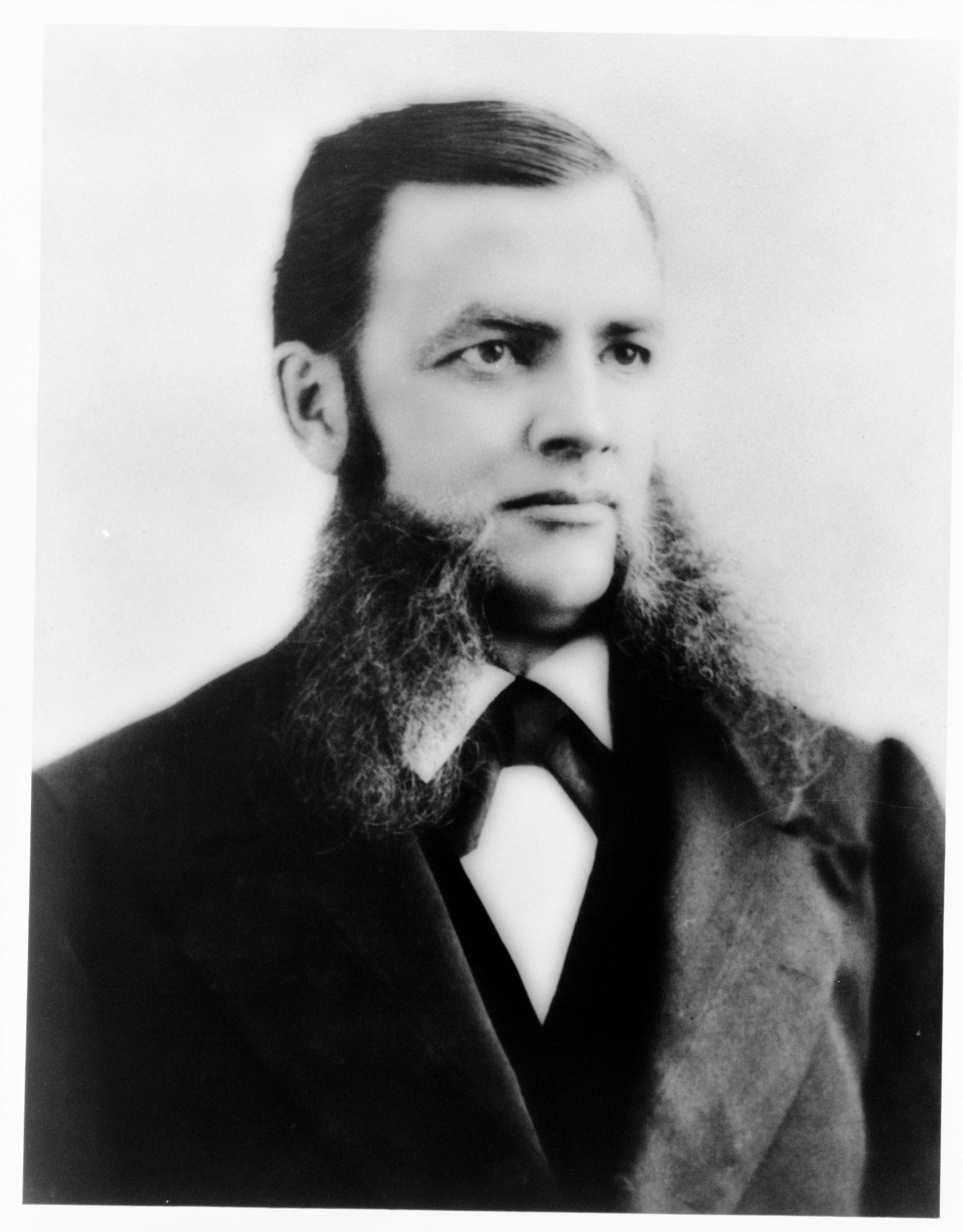
Portrait of Wilmot Whitfield

Wilmot Gladstone Whitfield (March 21, 1882 – September 24, 1931) was a Methodist minister who served in Alaska and Washington state during the late 19th and early 20th centuries.

== Early life and education ==
Whitfield was born in 1882, the son of Isabelle Glass and Rev. Wilmot Carroll Whitfield, president and chancellor of the University of the Northwest in Sioux City, Iowa. Whitfield grew up in Iowa and South Dakota, and was the second of four children.

Whitfield attended Northwestern University for his Doctorate of Divinity, and graduated in 1890.

== Career ==
Whitfield was a member of the Puget Sound Conference and was for a few years early in his career, the superintendent of the Alaska Mission and a pastor in Skagway, Alaska before moving to Washington State.

During his time as the Presiding Elder of the Seattle district of the Methodist church, Whitfield helped to incorporate the Washington Children's Home Society in January 1897. The organization aimed to provide homes for homeless families and children.

Whitfield, who was serving as the Presiding Elder of the Seattle district at the time, succeeded Crawford Thoburn as president of Puget Sound University (now University of Puget Sound) after Thoburn’s death in 1899. While Whitfield is listed as the President of the University from 1899-1902 in The Encyclopedia of World Methodism,), he was only the head of the school until 1900. During the following few years, the school was run by Dean Palmer and Professor Boyer.

== Prohibition ==
Whitfield was an acting member of the permanent committee on Temperance and Prohibition, which was a committee of the Methodist General Conference. During his time on the committee, the group recommended that the fourth Sunday in November was to be observed in all Methodist churches as "Temperance Sunday".

== Personal life ==
Whitfield married Carrie Estelle Cornelius in Seattle on July 22, 1906. They had a daughter, Isabella, and a son, Wilmot Cornelius Whitfield.
