= Ronald R. Thomas =

American academic administrator (1949–2023)

Ronald Thomas

13th President of the University of Puget Sound
- In office July 16, 2003 – June 30, 2016
- Succeeded by: Isiaah Crawford

Personal details
- Born: January 29, 1949 Orange, New Jersey, U.S.
- Died: April 17, 2023 (aged 74) Vashon Island, Washington, U.S.
- Spouse: Mary Domingo Thomas (m. 1991)
- Education: Wheaton College (BA); Brandeis University (MA, PhD)

Ronald R. Thomas (January 29, 1949 – April 17, 2023) was an American academic administrator who served as the 13th president of the University of Puget Sound. He held faculty and administrative appointments at University of Chicago, Harvard University, Trinity College, and the University of Puget Sound.

== Early life and education ==
Thomas was born in Orange, New Jersey, to Doris R. and Robert L. Thomas. His mother was an elementary school teacher and his father worked in accounting and administration at Monmouth University. Thomas grew up in the Ocean Grove section of Neptune Township, New Jersey and graduated from Neptune High School in 1967. He received a Bachelor of Arts degree in English literature (magna cum laude) from Wheaton College (1971) and a Master of Arts (1978) and PhD (1983) in English and American literature from Brandeis University.

== Career ==
After graduating from college, Thomas moved to Boston to join Clear Light Productions as a film and media producer. In 1982, he was appointed assistant professor of English at the University of Chicago where he remained until 1990. Thomas then returned to the East Coast to serve as professor and chair in the English Department at Trinity College.

Thomas was named Andrew W. Mellon Faculty Fellow in the Humanities at Harvard University in 1991 and 1992, taking a leave from Trinity to begin research on his second book project, Detective Fiction and the Rise of Forensic Science. Thomas was appointed college vice president and chief of staff at Trinity in 1998, overseeing the implementation of Trinity’s campus master plan and its nationally recognized engagement with the community. He was chosen as Trinity’s interim president in 2001 and 2002.

=== University of Puget Sound ===
Thomas served as the thirteenth president of the University of Puget Sound from July 16, 2003, to June 30, 2016. Major projects during his tenure included a 20-year campus master plan; a strategic plan of action that positioned the university as a national leader in liberal arts education focusing on civic engagement and innovation; and an ambitious comprehensive capital campaign.

Thomas also led new enrollment partnerships with the Tacoma Public Schools and the Posse Foundation to expand the university’s commitment to diversity, equity, and access.

Under Thomas’s leadership, Puget Sound was included in the guide Colleges That Change Lives, which singles out Puget Sound for the transformational effects that its dedicated faculty, innovative curriculum, and engaging community have on the lives of students and the accomplishments of graduates.

Students at the University of Puget Sound called him "RonThom."

In 2017, following his presidency, Thomas helped form Reinstitute, a group that works with campus leaders “to deepen the understanding of the fundamental challenges and transformations facing higher education and to implement mission-based action plans in response to them.” Thomas also served on the governing boards of the College of Idaho and Vashon Center for the Arts in Washington State.

== Scholarship ==
Much of Thomas’s scholarly work focuses on the role of the novel, and the interplay between fiction and reality, during the period stretching roughly from the Victorian Age through Modernity. For instance, Thomas “helped to pioneer a tradition of reading nineteenth-century literary realism... alongside and through photographic innovation,” and he “used the analogy of the body to examine the image of the detective’s city [in literature] as a closed system.”

== Personal life and death ==
Ron Thomas married Mary Domingo Thomas on June 15, 1991, at the Palazzo Vecchio in Florence, Italy. The couple met at Trinity, where Mary served as dean of students and lecturer in Classics.

Thomas died on April 17, 2023, at the age of 74.

=== Published books ===
- Dreams of Authority: Freud and the Fictions of the Unconscious (Cornell University Press, 1990), which shows how the representation of dream accounts in Victorian novels shaped Freud’s understanding of the human psyche. It was called "an intelligent and subtle book".
- Detective Fiction and the Rise of Forensic Science (Cambridge University Press, 1999), “the first book-length work to examine critically how the history of forensic detection intersects with the development of the detective genre in the early part of the twentieth-century.”
- Nineteenth Century Geographies: The Transformation of Space from the Victorian Age to the American Century (Rutgers University Press, 2002), a collection of essays co-edited with Helena Michie, examines how the period’s art and literature—in Britain and America—fundamentally altered the way we experience and conceive of time and space.

Thomas published two chapters of a forthcoming book titled Moving Pictures and Telling Stories: Specters of the Novel on Film. The project investigates the shifting conceptions of persons in late nineteenth- and early twentieth-century fiction in relation to the invention of cinema.

== Honors ==
Thomas was twice awarded honorary doctorates: a doctor of humane letters, honoris causa, from Trinity College in 2002, and another from the University of Portland in 2016, both for outstanding contributions to scholarship and teaching and for national leadership in higher education and public service.

In 2016 the University of Puget Sound Board of Trustees conferred the name “Thomas Hall” on the campus’s newest building, honoring Ron and Mary Thomas for their “exceptional leadership and for the landmark transformations made at the college during their 13 years of service.”

=== Additional awards ===
- Andrew W. Mellon Faculty Fellowship in the Humanities Harvard University (1991-92)
- Margaret Church Modern Fiction Studies Prize, for year’s best published essay (1986)
- National Endowment of the Arts Summer Research Fellowship (1995)
- Dean Arthur A. Hughes Award for Distinguished Teaching Achievement (Trinity College, 1997)
- Gold Award for Outstanding Writing of President’s Columns (Council for Advancement and Support of Education, 2008)
- President’s Award for outstanding commitment to student life from Region V of NASPA, the national organization of student affairs professionals (2015)
