= Edwin M. Randall Jr. =

American Methodist minister

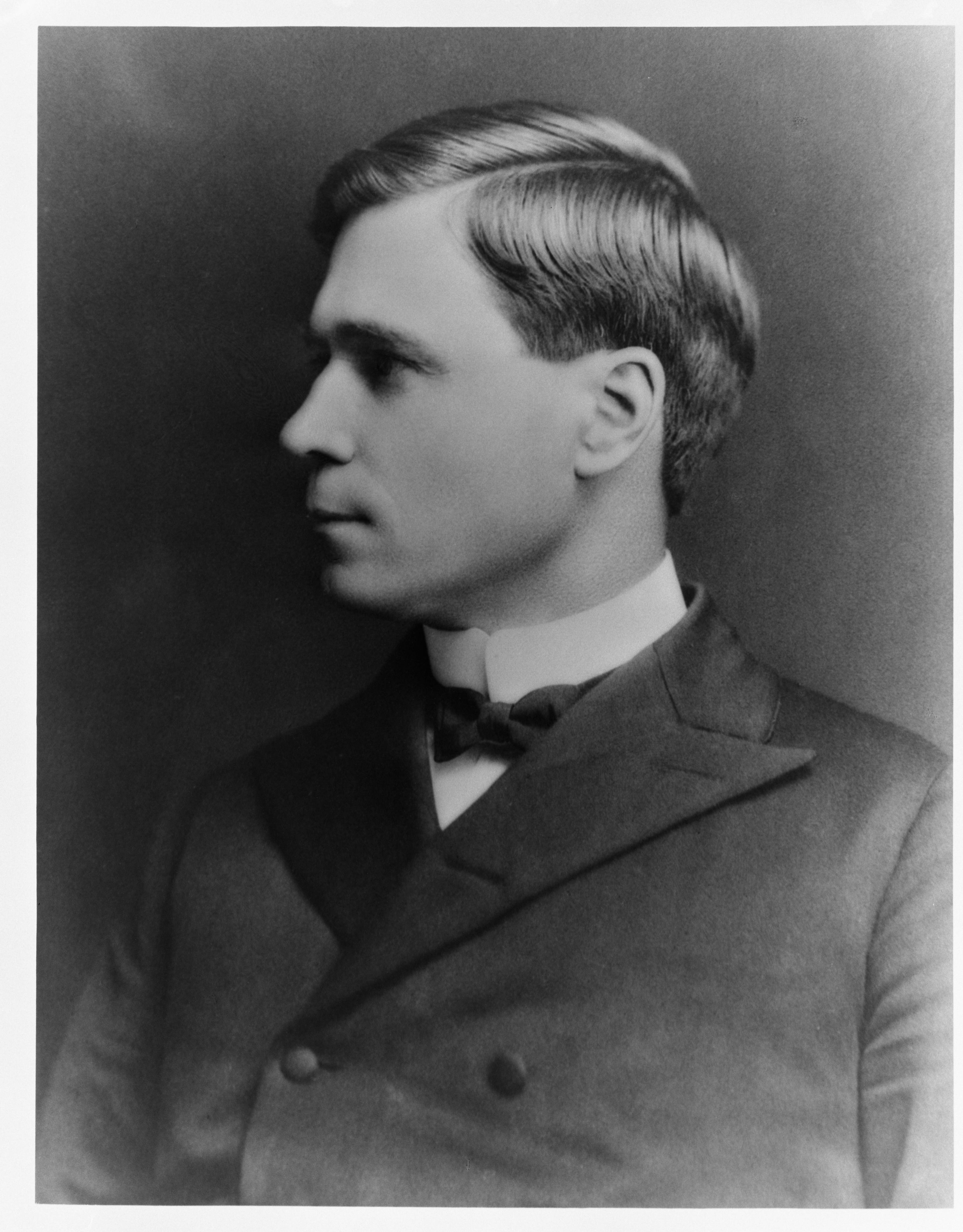
Portrait of Edwin M. Randall, circa 1903.

Edwin Randall Jr. was an American Methodist minister active in the church during the early twentieth century.

== Early career ==
Randall served as the president of the University of Puget Sound from 1903 to 1904.

Randall then left Tacoma when he was made the secretary of the Epworth League by the General Conference in Chicago, Illinois.

== Work with the Epworth League ==
Elected in 1904, Randall served as the General Secretary of the Epworth League for eight years. In his capacity as General Secretary of the Epworth League and president of the Institute faculty, Randall was a proponent of the Epworth League institutes; week-long educational programs for young Methodists with courses taught by college professors. The program focused on distancing youth from worldly distractions, and instead focusing on service and attending spiritual lectures. The Institutes were hosted in various parts of the country- in the early years Institutes were primarily hosted in the Midwest, but by 1912, the Institutes had grown so much in popularity that they were being hosted in California and Washington state in the West, and West Virginia and New York in the east.
