= Isiaah Crawford =

American academic administrator

14th President of the University of Puget Sound
- Incumbent
- Assumed office July 1, 2016

Personal details
- Born: Bethesda, Maryland, U.S.
- Education: St. Louis University (BA); DePaul University (MA, PhD)

Isiaah Crawford is an American academic administrator and psychologist working as the 14th president of the University of Puget Sound.

== Education ==
Crawford earned his bachelor's degree from Saint Louis University and master's and doctoral degrees in clinical psychology from DePaul University.

== Career ==
Crawford completed his pre-doctoral clinical psychology internship at the San Francisco VA Medical Center, and worked as a specialist at Charter Barclay Hospital and DePaul University Community Mental Health Center. He operated his own private clinical practice from 1987 to 2008.

Crawford previously served as provost and chief academic officer of Seattle University from 2008 to 2016 and dean of the College of Arts and Sciences at Loyola University Chicago from 2004 to 2008.

In 2016, Crawford was announced as the 14th president of the University of Puget Sound.

== Personal life ==
Crawford is openly gay and lives in Tacoma, WA with his spouse, Kent Korneisel, O.D.
