= Tacoma Mausoleum =

Historic site in Tacoma, Washington, US

- U.S. National Register of Historic Places
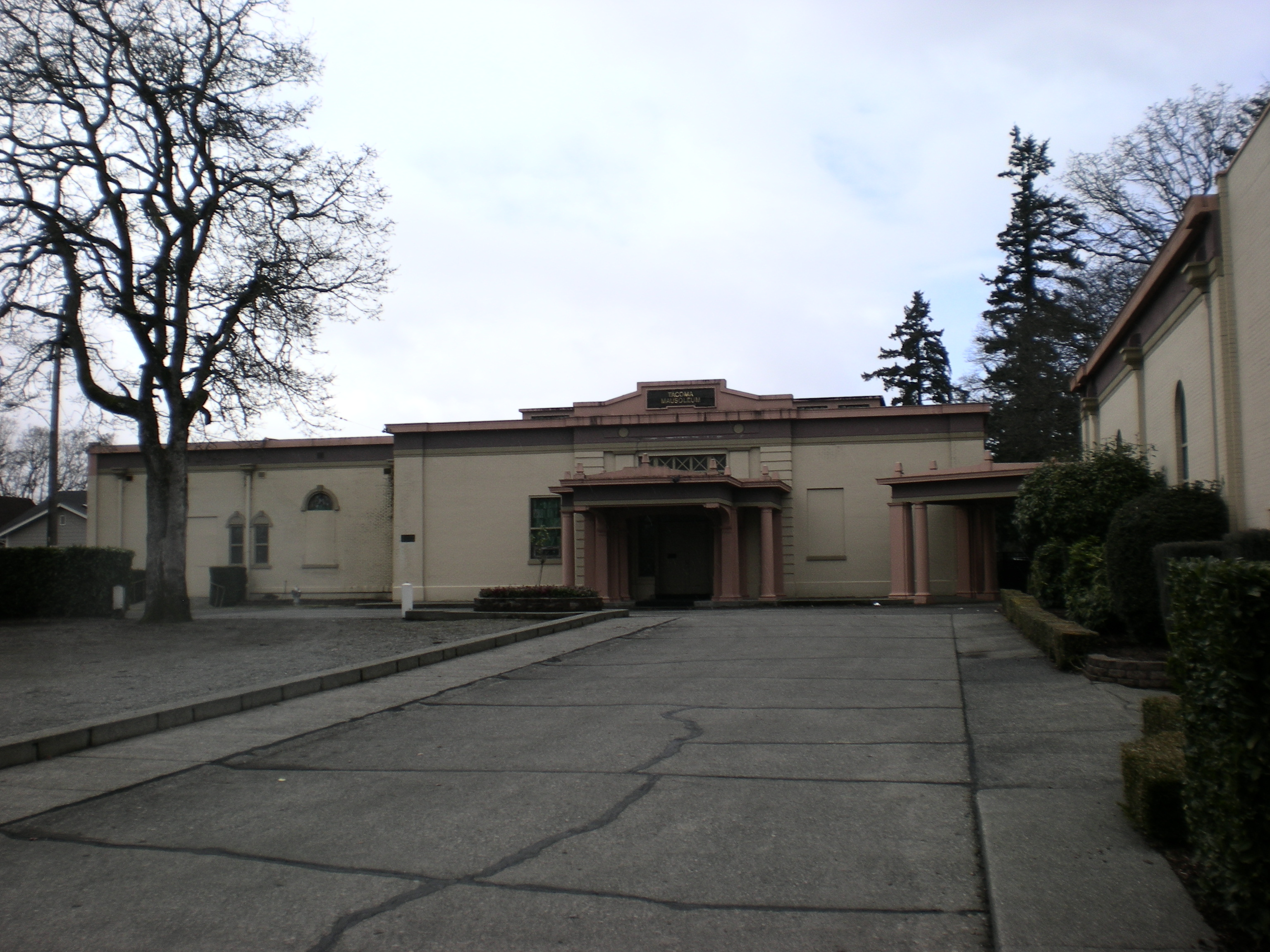

- Location within Washington (state)
- Location: 5302 S. Junett St., Tacoma, Washington
- Coordinates: 47°12′33″N 122°28′28″W
- Built: 1910
- Architect: Gove, George; Nelsen, Silas
- Architectural style: Classical Revival
- NRHP reference No.: 00000405
- Added to NRHP: April 21, 2000

The Tacoma Mausoleum is a mausoleum in Tacoma, Washington, United States. Built in 1910, the mausoleum was the first such structure in the U.S. to be built west of the Mississippi River. The building was added to the National Register of Historic Places in 2000.

In 1918, the mausoleum was sued by David Rea and his wife, who claimed that the existence of a mausoleum near homes constituted a nuisance. They were suing in an attempt to prevent the already built mausoleum from adding further structures on its premises, but the Washington Supreme Court ruled against them.

== See also ==
- Afterglow Vista: Mausoleum in San Juan County, Washington
- National Register of Historic Places listings in Pierce County, Washington

== Sources ==
- Reiter, Darlyne A. (2007). South Tacoma, Arcadia Publishing.
- Washington Supreme Court (1919). Cases Determined in the Supreme Court of Washington, Bancroft-Whitney Co.
