= University of Puget Sound =

Private university in Tacoma, Washington, US

- Former names: The Puget Sound University (1888–1903); College of Puget Sound (1914–1960)
- Motto: πρὸς τὰ ἄκρα
- Motto in English: To the heights!
- Type: Private liberal arts college
- Established: March 17, 1888; 138 years ago
- Religious affiliation: None; Previously United Methodist Church
- Endowment: $499.9 million (2025)
- President: Isiaah Crawford
- Faculty: 206 full-time; 63 part-time (fall 2021)
- Students: 2,023 (fall 2023)
- Undergraduates: 1,712 (fall 2023)
- Postgraduates: 220 (fall 2023)
- Location: Tacoma, Washington, United States
- Campus: Suburban, 97 acres (39 ha)
- Colors: Maroon and White
- Nickname: Loggers
- Sporting affiliations: NCAA Division III – Northwest Conference
- Mascot: "Grizz" the Logger
- Website: pugetsound.edu

The University of Puget Sound is a private liberal arts college in Tacoma, Washington, United States. It was founded in 1888. The institution offers a variety of undergraduate degrees as well as five graduate programs in counseling, education, occupational therapy, physical therapy, and public health.

Puget Sound's athletic programs compete in the National Collegiate Athletic Association's Division III Northwest Conference. The University of Puget Sound is also the only independent national undergraduate liberal arts college in the Pacific Northwest with a School of Music and School of Business and Leadership.

== History ==
The University of Puget Sound was founded by the Methodist Episcopal Church in 1888 in downtown Tacoma. The idea for a college in Tacoma originated with Charles Henry Fowler, who had previously been the president of Northwestern University. Fowler was in Tacoma for a Methodist conference when he spoke of his vision of a Christian institution of learning in the area. The conference released a report:

We commit ourselves ... heartily to the building up within the bounds of the conference of an institution of learning which shall by its ample facilities ... command the respect and patronage of Methodist people within the bounds of the territory ... and so by united and prayerful efforts advance to the establishment of a school of learning which shall be a praise in all the land.

Two cities vied for the location of the school: Port Townsend and Tacoma. The committee eventually decided on Tacoma. A charter was drawn up and filed in Olympia on March 17, 1888. This date marks the legal beginning of the school. At this time, the school's legal title was The Puget Sound University. In September 1890, Puget Sound opened its doors, taking in 88 students.

The beginnings of the school were marked by moral conviction: students were warned against intoxicating liquors, visits to saloons, gambling, tobacco use, and obscene drawings or writings on the college grounds. The institution also had a financially tumultuous beginning. There was no endowment and the school often struggled for funds to pay the professors. It moved locations three times in 13 years and, at one time, the school was merged with Portland University (former campus is now the University of Portland). It opened up a year later (1899) back in Tacoma on the 9th and G Street. In 1903, the school was "reborn" and re-incorporated as a different entity, different trustees, and a different name: the University of Puget Sound.

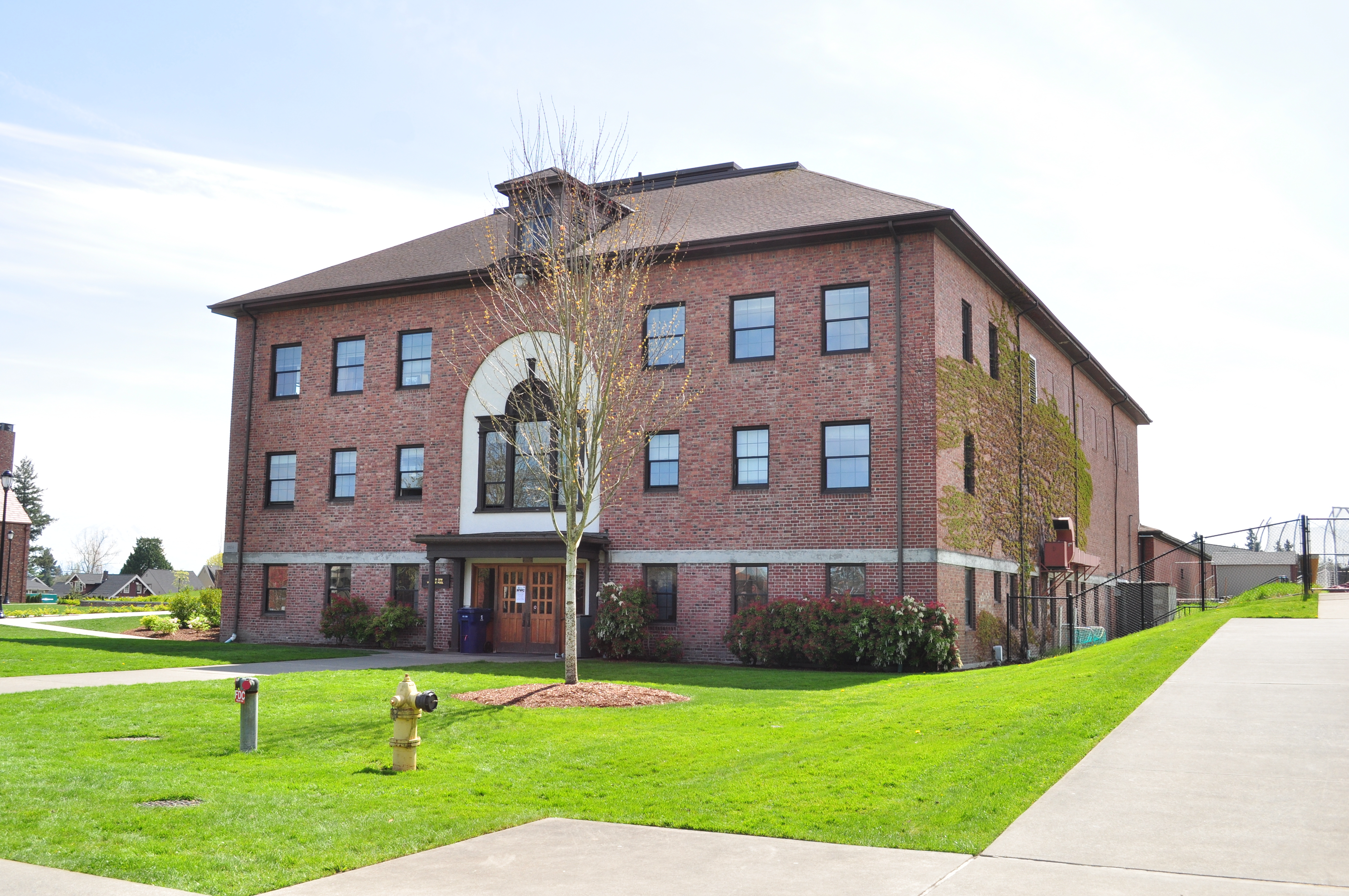
Warner Gym, one of the original 1924 buildings

The character of the school changed dramatically during the presidency of Edward H. Todd (1913–1942), who worked tirelessly to bring financial and academic stability. During his tenure, the "Million Dollar Campaign" was started, raising $1,022,723 for buildings, equipment, and endowment. With this money, the campus moved in 1924 to its current location in the residential North End of Tacoma, with five buildings, setting a stylistic tone for the institution. In 1914, the institution was renamed the College of Puget Sound.

President R. Franklin Thompson (1942–1973) led a massive physical and institutional expansion: During this era almost all of the institution's buildings were constructed. In 1960, the institution's name changed from the College of Puget Sound back to the University of Puget Sound, as it is known today.

Phillip M. Phibbs presided from 1973 to 1992 and endeavored to change the tone of Puget Sound. In 1980, the institution divested its attachment with the Methodist Church, and an independent board of trustees assumed full fiscal responsibility of the institution. Also during this time, the institution began to focus on undergraduate education, phasing out all off-campus programs except the law school and most graduate programs. During this time the library collections were broadened and the faculty greatly expanded.

With the advent of President Susan Resneck Pierce (1992–2003), the law school was promptly sold to Seattle University, in a move that was calculated to focus the institution's resources on its undergraduate campus. During her tenure, the institution completed almost $100 million of new construction and renovation. Collins Memorial Library and four academic buildings were renovated, and Wyatt Hall was constructed to house the growing class and office space needs of the Humanities Department. Trimble Residence Hall was constructed, bringing on-campus student residency to 65%. SAT scores rose from 1067 to 1253 and the endowment more than tripled.

Puget Sound's president from 2003 to early 2016 was Ronald R. Thomas—affectionately called "Ron Thom" by many students—a scholar of Victorian literature, and the former vice-president of Trinity College.

In February 2016, the institution announced the selection of Isiaah Crawford to be its next president, upon Thomas's retirement. President Crawford assumed office on July 1, 2016.

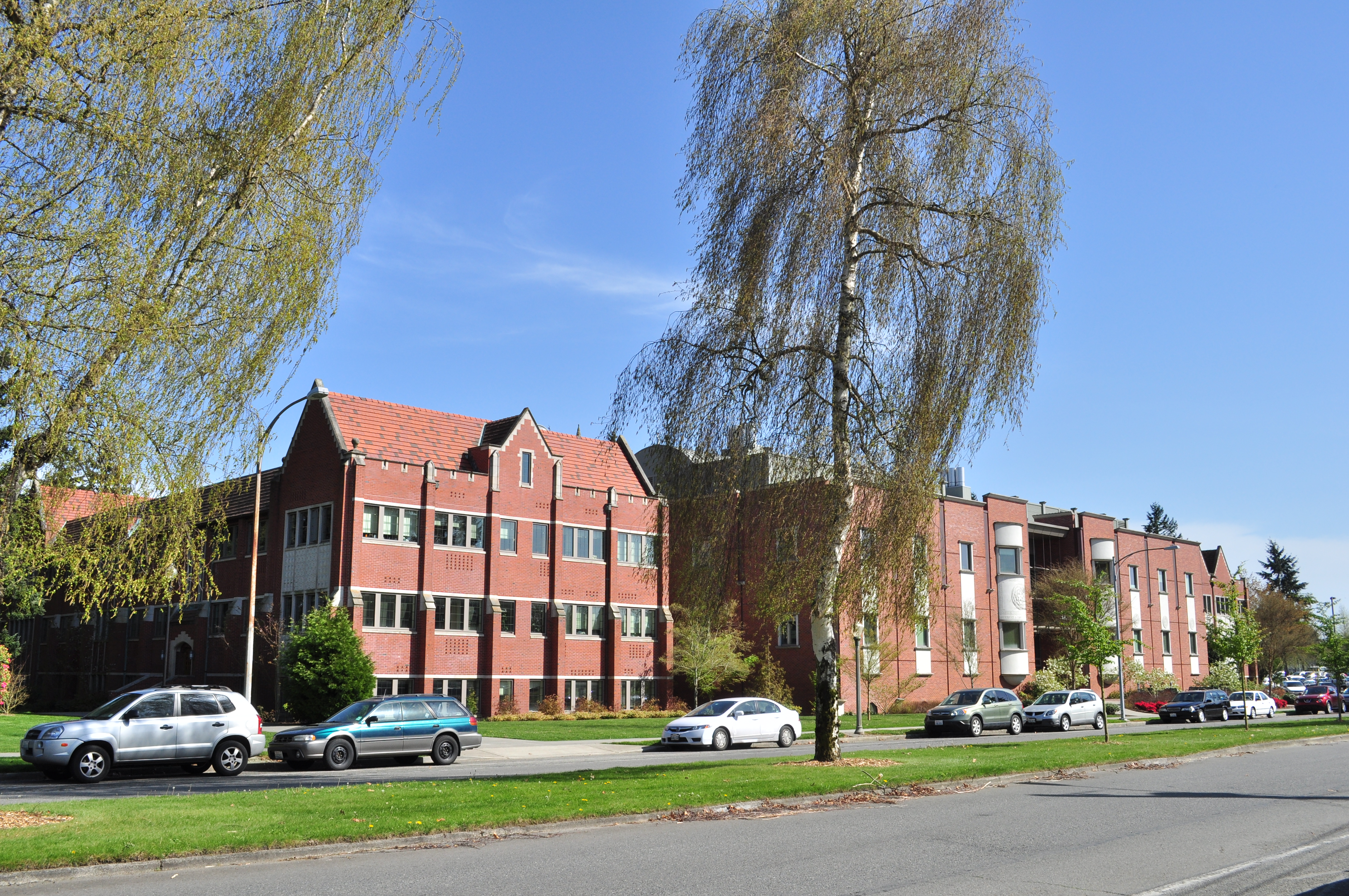
Harned and Thompson Halls, along Union Avenue. Harned Hall is at center, with wings of Thompson Hall on either side.

Thompson Hall, home of the sciences at the institution, underwent a major renovation, including the construction of a new wing (Harned Hall, completed 2006) on the building's western side against Union Avenue and extensive renovations to the current wings and courtyard to allow for upgraded labs and facilities. The entire project was completed in mid 2008. The entire complex is now known locally as "The Science Center at Puget Sound." The now completely enclosed courtyard contains a striking Plexiglas structure where a coffee shop, Oppenheimer Cafe, is located.

In fall 2013, Puget Sound opened Thomas Hall, a residence hall for upper-division students featuring 11 "houses" organized around five academic-residential programs: the Humanities Program, environmental outdoor leadership, international experiential learning, entrepreneurship, and the Honors Program. The hall is home for 135 students, and includes a seminar room, four studies, and an event/meeting space for approximately 150 people, accommodating special events, guest lectures, performances and more.

In April 2024, students joined other campuses in protesting and establishing encampments against the Gaza war and alleged genocide in Palestine. They called for divestment by the university from companies supporting the war. A talk given by US Representative Derek Kilmer was disrupted leading to 2 students being charged, 1 hospitalisation and a lockdown of the university. The protestors alleged that the investigation leading to charges was racist.

=== Presidents ===
1. William D. Tyler (1888–1890)
2. Fletcher B. Chereington (1890–1892)
3. Crawford R. Thoburn (1892–1899)
4. Wilmot G. Whitfield (1899–1901)
5. Charles O. Boyer (acting president, 1901–1903)
6. Edwin M. Randall Jr. (1903–1904)
7. Joseph E. Williams (1904–1907)
8. Lee L. Benbow (1907–1909)
9. Julius Christian Zeller (1909–1913)
10. Edward H. Todd (1913–1942)
11. R. Franklin Thompson (1942–1973)
12. Philip M. Phibbs (1973–1992)
13. Susan Resneck Pierce (1992–2003)
14. Ronald R. Thomas (2003–2016)
15. Isiaah Crawford (2016–present)

== Campus ==
The campus is located in North Tacoma, Washington in a primarily residential setting a few minutes' walk from the Proctor and the Sixth Avenue district.

The campus is made up of mainly brick buildings in the Tudor-Gothic architectural style. Buildings are mostly arranged into quads. The three main quads are the North Quad and South Quad, which contain residence halls, and Karlen Quad, which contains Jones Hall, Collins Memorial Library and the Music Building. The library was designed by Tacoma architect Silas E. Nelsen in 1954. It was later renovated.

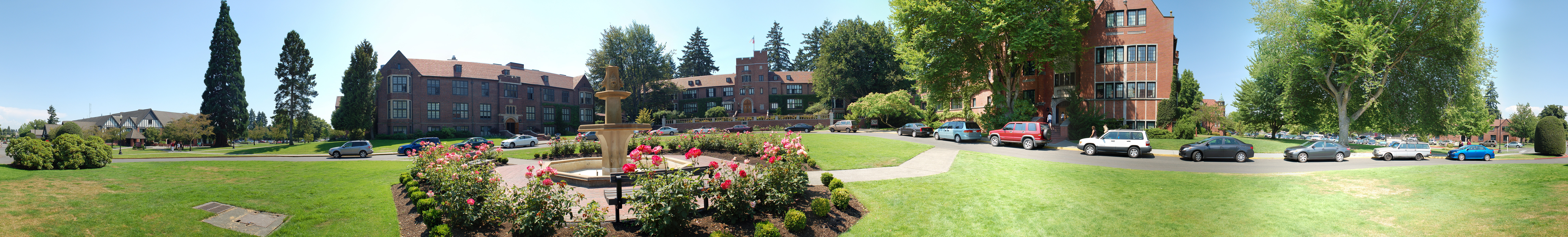
University of Puget Sound campus on a sunny July afternoon.

=== Academic buildings ===
Harned Hall, named for alumnus and local real estate developer H.C. "Joe" Harned, was dedicated on September 29, 2006. The building is 51,000 square feet (4,700 m^{2}) and cost $25 million to construct. It was designed and built to meet the U.S. Green Building Council's LEED Silver Standard. The building features labs for biology, geology, chemistry, environmental science, and physics, a 10,000-square-foot (930 m^{2}) courtyard with a crystalline glass gazebo in the center, a Foucault pendulum designed by Alan Thorndike, as well as Gray whale skeleton named Willy.

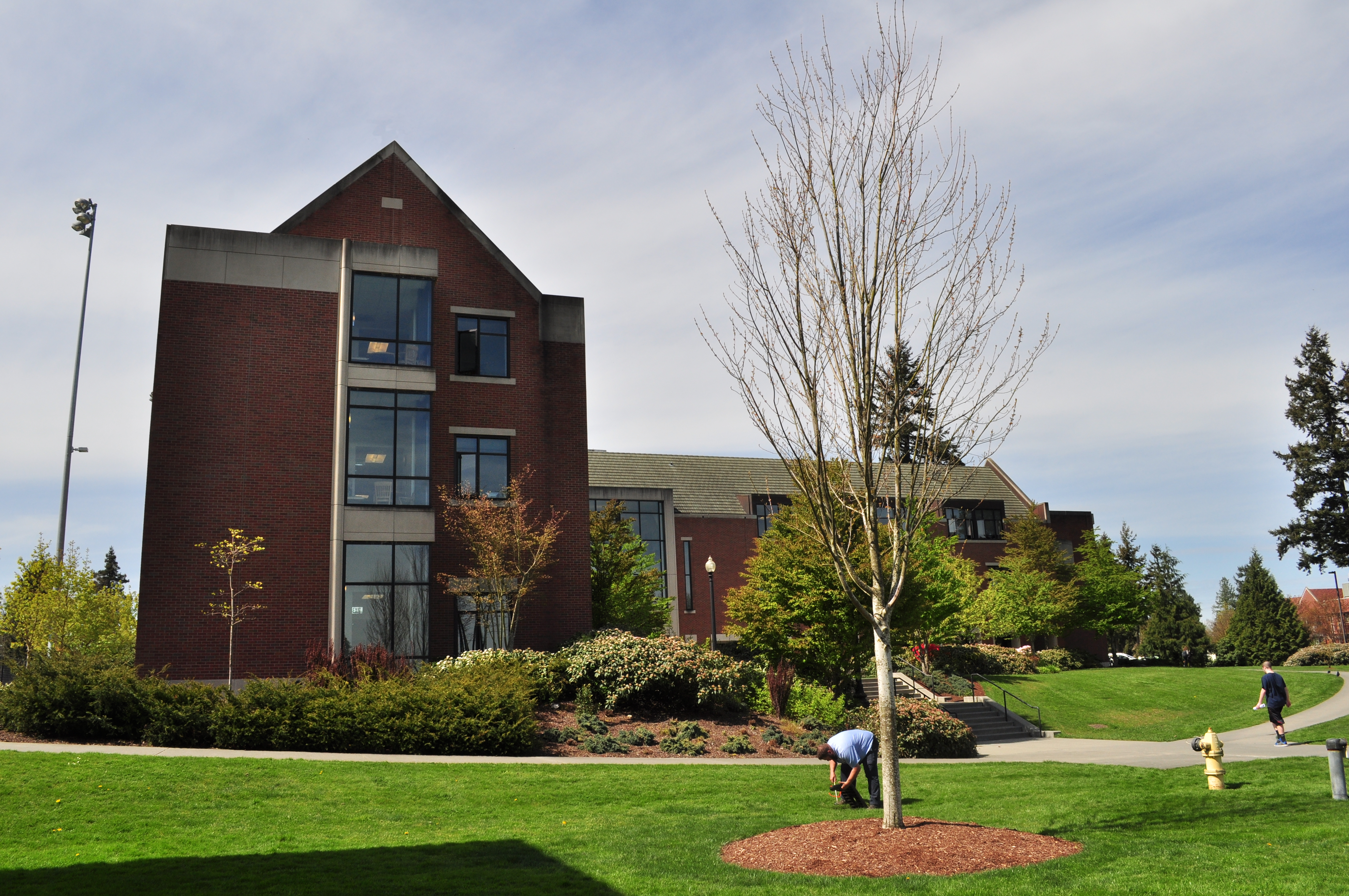
Wyatt Hall

After Harned Hall was completed, the institution began a $38 million renovation of Thompson Hall, the "old" science building. Harned and Thompson Halls form a square with a courtyard in the middle, and are collectively named the Science Center. Thompson Hall has an area of 121,000 square feet (11,200 m^{2}) and was originally constructed in 1968. The renovation was completed in spring 2008.

Wyatt Hall is the second newest academic building on campus, dedicated in 2003. It houses the English, History, Foreign Languages & Literature, Politics & Government, Philosophy, Honors, Science Technology & Society, Classics, and Religion departments. Many of the classrooms in the building are seminar style, meaning a circle of tables that students sit at to encourage discussion between students and the professor, rather than a lecture. The building features glass art by Dale Chihuly that represents the ivy leaves covering the campus buildings.

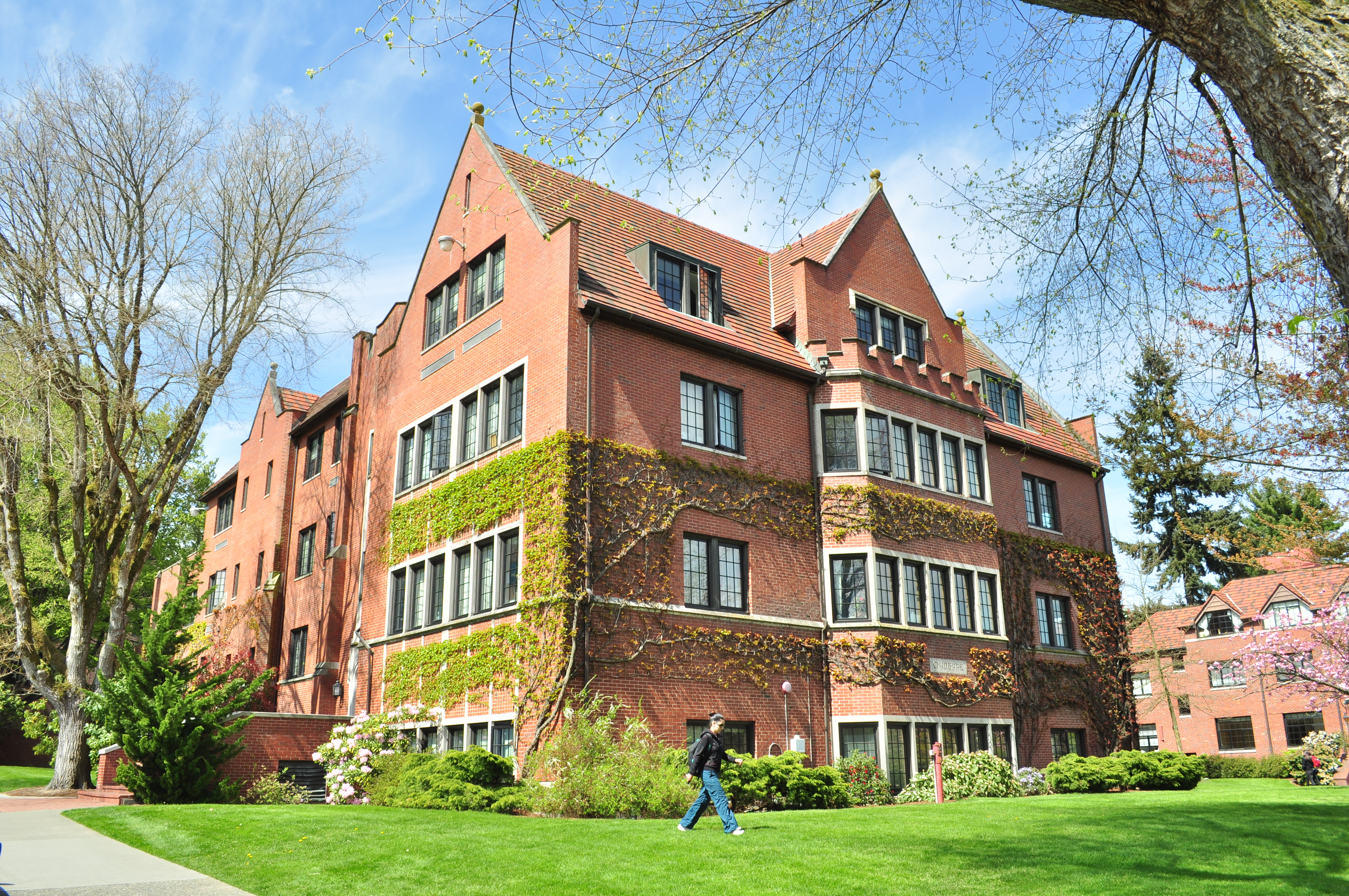
McIntyre Hall

Other buildings include McIntyre Hall, home of the School of Business and Leadership, the Departments of Economics, Sociology and Anthropology, and International Political Economy; Howarth Hall, home of the School of Education, Office of Diversity and Inclusion, Career and Employment Services, and more; Jones Hall, home of theatre arts, communication studies, and several administrative offices, including the Office of the President; and the Music Building (which is the only building on campus without a name). Kittredge Hall, the original student union building, now houses the art department and Kittredge Gallery. The Gallery is now affiliated with Tacoma Art Museum.

Collins Memorial Library houses over 400,000 books and over 130,000 periodicals, is a partial federal government repository, and has substantial microform holdings. The Library was named after former trustee Everill S. Collins. The current Library building was built in 1954. A larger addition was completed in 1974. In 2000, a major renovation brought new technology and media resources into the Library's spaces.

Construction for the William T. and Gail T. Weyerhaeuser Center for Health Sciences began in spring 2010. At 42,500 square feet (3,950 m^{2}), the center provides the resources and flexibility needed to support new areas of study in the fields of health and behavioral sciences. Specially designed to encourage cross-disciplinary interaction, the center houses Puget Sound's undergraduate departments in exercise science and psychology, graduate programs in occupational and physical therapy, and interdisciplinary program in neuroscience. Designed by Bohlin Cywinski Jackson/Seattle, Weyerhaeuser Hall conforms to the U.S. Green Building Council's Leadership in Energy and Environmental Design (LEED) Silver standards.

== Academics ==
The institution offers more than fifty traditional and nontraditional areas of study in the liberal arts and sciences, as well as graduate programs in occupational therapy, physical therapy, and education. It recently launched a master of public health program. The student to faculty ratio is 12 to 1.

=== Rankings and reputation ===
Academic rankings

Liberal arts
- U.S. News & World Report: 95
- Washington Monthly: 80

National
- Forbes: 205
- WSJ/College Pulse: 156

In 2012, Puget Sound was named one of forty schools nationwide in the college guide Colleges That Change Lives: 40 Schools That Will Change the Way You Think About Colleges.

The institution has ranked among the top five small liberal arts colleges for the number of graduates who participate in Peace Corps; in 2007, it ranked first.

Puget Sound professors have been named Washington State Professor of the Year seven times by the Carnegie Foundation for the Advancement of Teaching and the Council for the Advancement and Support of Education.

=== Admissions ===
For the Class of 2022 (enrolling fall 2018), University of Puget Sound received 5,730 applications, admitted 3,060 (58.3%), and enrolled 653 students. For the freshmen who enrolled, the middle 50% range of SAT scores was 1230-1450, the ACT composite range was 27–32, and the average high school grade point average was 3.70.

=== International programs ===
The institution sponsors study abroad programs in Argentina, Australia, Austria, Chile, China, Costa Rica, Denmark, England, France, Germany, Greece, Ireland, Italy, Japan, the Netherlands, New Zealand, the Pacific Rim, Scotland, Spain, Taiwan, and Wales.

The program in the Pacific Rim, known as PacRim, or the Pacific Rim/Asia Study-Travel Program (PRAST) is unique to Puget Sound. Every three years a group of fifteen to twenty-five students are selected to spend two semesters traveling, studying, and researching in eight Asian countries. Students must have taken three courses in the Asian studies program and completed a course of readings assigned by the director. Over the program's 40-year history students have visited: Mongolia, People's Republic of China, Japan, South Korea, India, Nepal, Vietnam, Thailand, Cambodia, Malaysia, Sri Lanka, Indonesia, Papua New Guinea, Fiji, Australia, New Zealand, Iran, and Yugoslavia. Previous lecturers have included: Johan Galtung, Ken Yeang, M.S. Nagaraja Rao, Jack Weatherford, the 14th Dalai Lama, Swasti Sri Charukeerthi Bhattaraka, Ogyen Trinley Dorje, Khyongla Rato Rinpoche, and Sogyal Rinpoche.

== Athletics ==
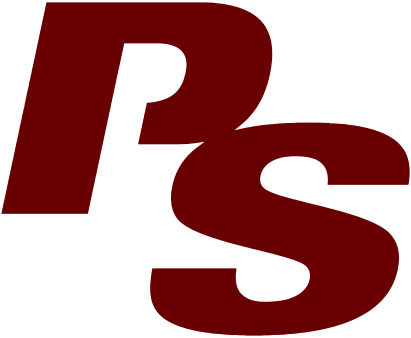
Puget Sound athletics logo

Puget Sound athletics teams are nicknamed the "Loggers." The teams' mascot is "Grizz the Logger," a costumed student dressed as an anthropomorphic brown bear wearing stereotypical lumberjack attire and carrying a small axe. The Loggers participate in the NCAA's Division III Northwest Conference, competing with George Fox University, Lewis and Clark College, Linfield College, Pacific University, Pacific Lutheran University, Whitman College, Whitworth University, and Willamette University.

=== Varsity sports ===
The institution offers twenty-three different varsity sports teams: men's baseball, men's and women's basketball, men's and women's crew, men's and women's cross country, men's football, men's and women's golf, women's lacrosse, men's and women's soccer, women's softball, men's and women's swimming, men's and women's tennis, men's and women's indoor and outdoor track & field, and women's volleyball. On a minor note, former United States men's national soccer team coach Bruce Arena got his coaching start at Puget Sound in 1976 as head of the men's soccer team.

=== Club sports ===
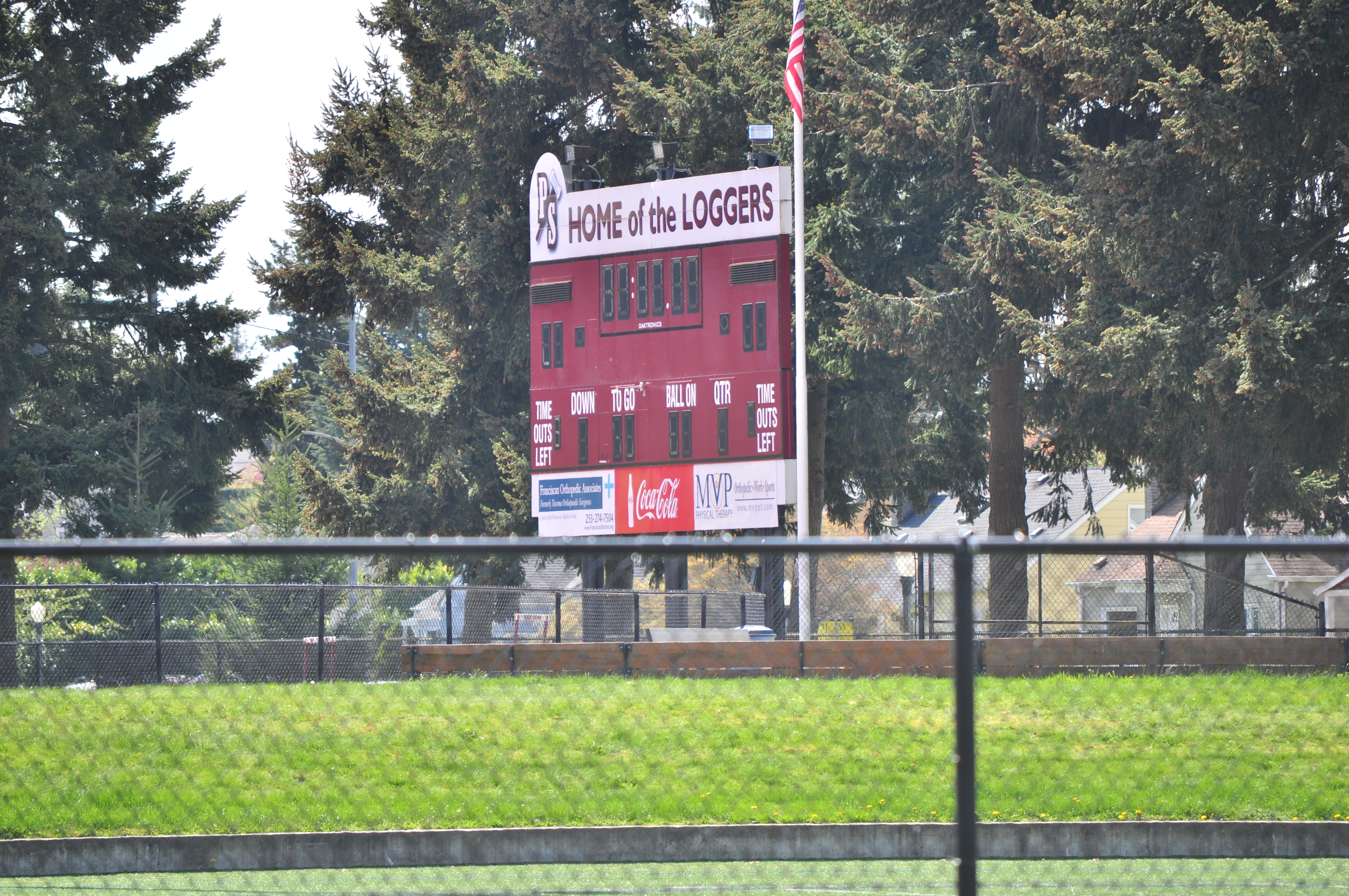
Scoreboard at Peyton Field

There are both men's and women's club soccer teams, as well as men's club lacrosse (which competes in the Pacific Northwest Collegiate Lacrosse League). The institution also has a men's club Ultimate team known as the "Postmen," and a women's club Ultimate team known as "Clear Cut".

The institution is well known for its successful men's rugby club. The club has achieved regional and national success over the past three seasons under coach Mark Sullivan. In 2012 the club was ranked 10th in the nation for small college rugby and traveled to Cal Maritime University in Vallejo, California for the regional tournament. The success of the men's rugby club is attributed to the hard work of the players and continual dedication of their coaches. Also, an intense rivalry has developed between the Puget Sound rugby club and the Seattle University rugby club. Known as the Seatac Cup, Puget Sound has achieved eight straight victories over their rivals. In 2012, the victory over Seattle University clinched the Loggers' playoff spot.

The Puget Sound Loggers hockey team was founded in 2005 and is currently an ACHA division II team. The team's most prominent victories include defeating the University of Washington Huskies in a 3-game series in the 2006-2007 season, and the Gonzaga Bulldogs in the 2007-2008 season. Loggers hockey is subsidized by ASUPS (the Associated Students of University of Puget Sound) student body and ticket sales for home games. Home games are currently played at the Sprinker Ice Arena in south Tacoma. Players come from the student body, and mostly consist of students hailing from Canada, Washington, Colorado, Minnesota, and states on the East Coast.

=== Achievements ===
In a football game against Linfield University on October 21, 2023, linebacker Lily Godwin became the first woman to record an unassisted tackle in the history of the NCAA. Godwin shared her tackle and her history with football in a live TV interview with King5 News.

Several sports teams have achieved some degree of success in recent years:

- The men's basketball team won three straight Northwest Conference championships beginning in 2004, with an average .826 winning percentage over the 2004, 2005, and 2006 seasons. In 2005, the Division III Loggers defeated the Division I Highlanders of the University of California, Riverside, making it their first Division I defeat since the 1970s. In the 2009 regular season, the Loggers went an undefeated 16-0 in Northwest Conference play, becoming the first team in conference history to do so, capturing the conference title in the process.
- From 1992 to 1995 the Puget Sound women's Cross-Country team were national champions. This tremendous 4-year run earned coach Sam Ring coach of the year honors in 1993.
- The women's soccer team took second place in the nation in 2004 and ended the 2005 season ranked fifth nationally.
- The women's swim team won the Northwest Conference championship for eleven consecutive years, from 1997 through 2007, before finally finishing second to Whitworth University in 2008. This remains a Northwest Conference record. The Logger women reclaimed their title in 2009.
- The women's basketball team made the Division III Elite 8 in the 2007 season after upsetting #12 ranked McMurry University and #2 ranked Howard Payne University. They finished #10 overall.
- The women's crew has earned a bid to compete at the Division III Rowing Championship every year since 2003. The team placed second overall in 2003 and third in 2008, as well as fourth in 2004, 2005, and 2007.

== Student life ==
=== Traditions and events ===
Repertory Dance Group (RDG) is a non-competitive dance performance held at the end of each semester and is entirely organized, choreographed, and performed by students. RDG has been a tradition of celebrating movement and expression for dancers of any skill level for nearly 30 years. It is also the most populous student group at the institution.

In 2013 Puget Sound celebrated its 125th anniversary with a series of special events, anniversary programs, and shared memories by Loggers past and present. Celebrating the milestone of 125 years in the community, Tacoma Mayor Marilyn Strickland declared March 17, 2013, to be "University of Puget Sound Day."

LogJam! is a campuswide celebration that ends the first week of fall classes. Tables are set around the perimeter of Todd Field and the Event Lawn, and clubs and teams set up to recruit potential members.

Foolish Pleasures is an annual student film festival showing films written, directed, acted, and produced by students.

==== The Hatchet ====
The Hatchet is the official symbol of sports teams at the University of Puget Sound. It was first discovered in 1906 when students were digging up a barn at the old campus. They decided to carve their class year into it. This became a tradition of sorts, as the seniors would hand the hatchet to the juniors on senior recognition day. This turned into a competition where each class would try to possess the hatchet for as long as possible. It disappeared for 15 years until it was anonymously mailed to former President R. Franklin Thompson. Thompson displayed it in a trophy case in Jones Hall, where it mysteriously disappeared again, only to resurface at a homecoming game in 1988. In 1998, the hatchet's return was negotiated through an intermediary, and it was permanently displayed in a display case in the Wheelock Student Center. It was stolen in 1999 during a false fire alarm in one of the dormitories.

On September 30, 2006 (homecoming) a student rappelled into the football field at halftime, brandishing "the hatchet". It was later revealed by the student newspaper The Trail that this hatchet is a replica of the actual hatchet, commissioned by the former student government administration without the knowledge of the student senate. The replica hatchet was painstakingly carved to look exactly like the original, using over 150 photos as a guide.

The original hatchet was finally returned to President Ronald Thomas in 2008 by two anonymous alumni and was displayed at Homecoming.

==== Sustainability ====
The campus has a notable recent history of sustainability. On February 10, 2005, President Ronald R. Thomas signed the Talloires Declaration, committing the institution to certain standards regarding sustainability. The Sustainability Advisory Committee, consisting of one faculty co-chair, one staff co-chair, and a mix of faculty, staff and student volunteers, organizes the majority of sustainability efforts on campus. These efforts have included:

- Fair trade coffee: The student-run Diversions Café serves only organically-grown, fair trade coffee. In 2005, 8,975 pounds (4,071 kg) of coffee was consumed by students, faculty, and the campus community. University of Puget Sound was the first college in the Northwest to offer fair trade coffee exclusively.
- Sustainable Move-Out: Starting in 2005, the institution organized a sustainable move-out program during finals week. Mixed-material recycling dumpsters were placed near all residence halls, allowing students to recycle rather than simply throwing all unwanted items away.
- Sustainability Mugs: Upon entering the college in 2005, all students were presented with a "sustainability mug" imprinted with the University of Puget Sound logo. Students were encouraged to re-use the mug to get coffee instead of using paper cups.
- No-Waste Picnic: A 2005 picnic welcoming incoming freshmen and their families to the campus produced a surprising one bag of trash for over 1700 people. This was accomplished by using recyclable paper and plastic products.

In 2007, President Thomas signed the American College and University Presidents Climate Commitment on behalf of the institution.

=== Fraternities and sororities ===
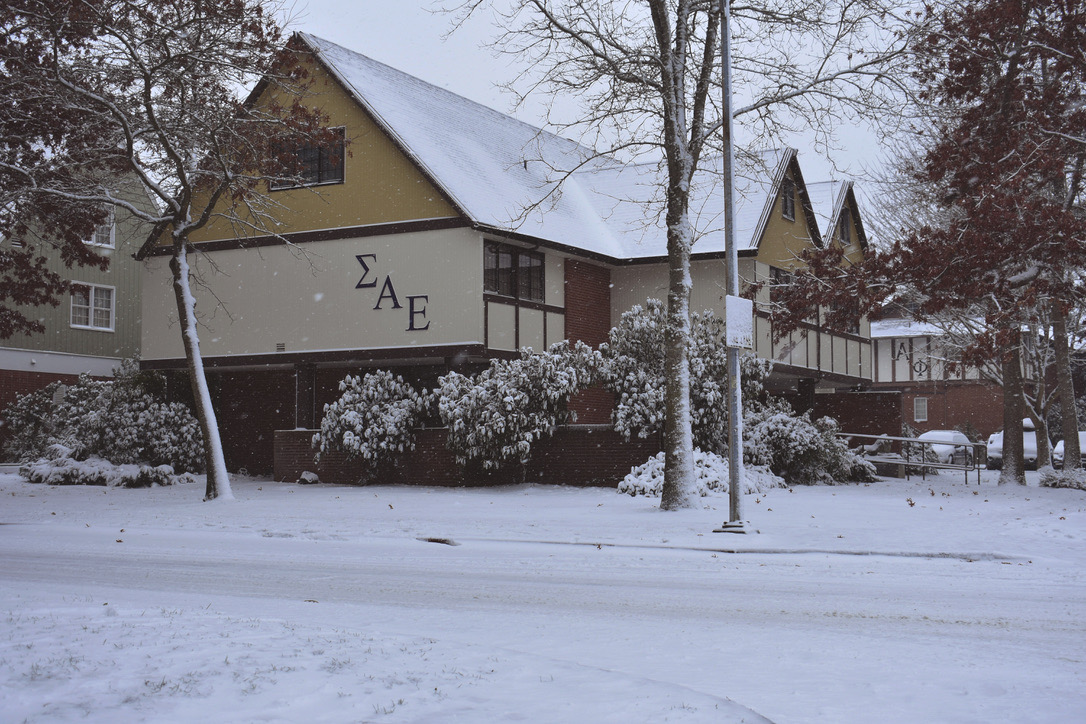
Sigma Alpha Epsilon house, University of Puget Sound

The University of Puget Sound is home to three fraternities and four sororities. Puget Sound has "deferred recruitment", which means that fraternities, sororities, and their members are not allowed to have intense contact with freshmen outside of class, athletics or club activities until the spring semester.

=== Media ===
KUPS 90.1FM (The Sound) is a student-run college radio station that began in 1968. In 2002, KUPS began streaming its standard live programming online. The radio station broadcasts 24 hours a day, 7 days a week and serves the greater Tacoma area. In 2005, KUPS was named by The Princeton Review as one of the best college radio stations in the country (#12). In 2007, KUPS was ranked #9 by the Princeton Review in the Top Ten Best College Radio Stations in the Country. Most recently, in the spring of 2010, MTV honored KUPS with the national title of Best College Radio Station at the MTVu Woodie Awards. In the fall of 2011, KUPS was ranked third in a list of "10 great college radio stations" in the Washington Post.

The Trail is an independent student-run weekly newspaper.

"Crosscurrents" is the school's literary and arts magazine and was established in 1957. Crosscurrents is published two times during the academic year, once during the Fall semester and once during the Spring semester. Magazines are free to the campus community. It is staffed by students and publishes student artwork, photography, prose, poetry, and the occasional miscellaneous piece. Crosscurrents also features a guest artist or writer in each issue- usually a notable person from the pacific northwest who is interviewed about their work.

"Wetlands" is a student-organized magazine focusing on sexual exploration and gender expression to encourage inclusive and open-minded conversations across the campus community.

"Elements" is the school's student-run science magazine. Published twice during the academic year, Elements primarily contains student articles about science, research, math, the environment, and technology, as well as student artwork. Copies of Elements are free and are distributed at the end of Fall semester and Spring semester.

"Black Ice" (or the Black Student Union Zine) is a student magazine by the focused on issues for the betterment of all students of color. The magazine is published by The Black Student Union, which was founded in 1968, making it one of the institution's oldest clubs.
