= Agua Mala =

- The X-Files episode
- The sea creature attempts to strangle George Vincent (Jeremy Roberts). The tentacles were created out of a combination of silicone and urethane to make them flexible.
- Episode no.: Season 6 Episode 13
- Directed by: Rob Bowman
- Written by: David Amann
- Production code: 6ABX14
- Original air date: February 21, 1999
- Running time: 44 minutes

Guest appearances
- Darren McGavin as Arthur Dales; Joel McKinnon Miller as Deputy Greer; Valente Rodriguez as Walter Suarez; Diana-Maria Riva as Angela Villareal; Jeremy Roberts as George Vincent; Silas Weir Mitchell as Dougie; Nichole Pelerine as Sara Shipley; Max Kasch as Evan Shipley

Episode chronology
← Previous "One Son"	Next → "Monday"
- The X-Files season 6

"Agua Mala" is the thirteenth episode of the sixth season of the science fiction television series The X-Files. It premiered on the Fox network on February 21, 1999, in the United States. The episode was written by David Amann, and directed by Rob Bowman. The episode is a "Monster-of-the-Week" story, unconnected to the series' wider mythology. "Agua Mala" earned a Nielsen household rating of 10.1, being watched by 16.9 million people in its initial broadcast. The episode received mostly mixed to negative reviews.

The show centers on FBI special agents Fox Mulder (David Duchovny) and Dana Scully (Gillian Anderson) who work on cases linked to the paranormal, called X-Files. Mulder is a believer in the paranormal, while the skeptical Scully has been assigned to debunk his work. In this episode, Arthur Dales, now living in a Florida trailer park, calls Mulder and Scully for help when a neighboring family disappears; and, with a hurricane approaching, Mulder and Scully find themselves trapped with a group of residents in a building where there is something in the water.

"Agua Mala" was Amann's second story for The X-Files. The original idea for the episode featured a monster loose in an abandoned gold mine. Darren McGavin makes a second appearance as Arthur Dales after being introduced in "Travelers." After suffering a stroke, he would later be replaced by M. Emmet Walsh in "The Unnatural." The episode was notable for its sheer amount of water and its lack of bright lighting, a stylistic approach that Gillian Anderson likened to filming in Vancouver.

== Plot ==
In Goodland, Florida, during a fierce hurricane, Sara Shipley and her son are attacked by a tentacled creature. After receiving a call, FBI agents Fox Mulder (David Duchovny) and Dana Scully (Gillian Anderson) visit retired agent Arthur Dales (Darren McGavin), one of the first agents to investigate the X-Files. Dales tells them that Sara called him after something with tentacles attacked her husband. Mulder and Scully find the Shipley home deserted, and before long, the storm traps them in the area. At a nearby condominium complex, they find a local police officer, Deputy Greer, unconscious with red welts on his neck. Mulder warns the remaining residents that a creature may be moving through the plumbing and theorizes that the hurricane drove it from the sea into the water system.

After Scully removes specimens from Greer's wounds, he is placed in a bathtub of freshwater. A looter accidentally spills Epsom salts into the water, after which the creature attacks and Greer disappears. Mulder concludes that the entity is a living form of water that uses people as hosts to reproduce. When Mulder himself is attacked, the residents of the condominium complex lock him outside. As the creature attacks again, Scully realizes that freshwater repels it and that Greer had been safe until the Epsom salts turned his bathwater saline. She thus has one of the residents activate the building's sprinklers, driving the creature away. Meanwhile, Mulder manages to reach the freshwater rain outside and begins to recover. The next morning, the creature has vanished. After hearing their story, Dales remarks that he might not have retired if he had had a partner like Scully.

== Production ==
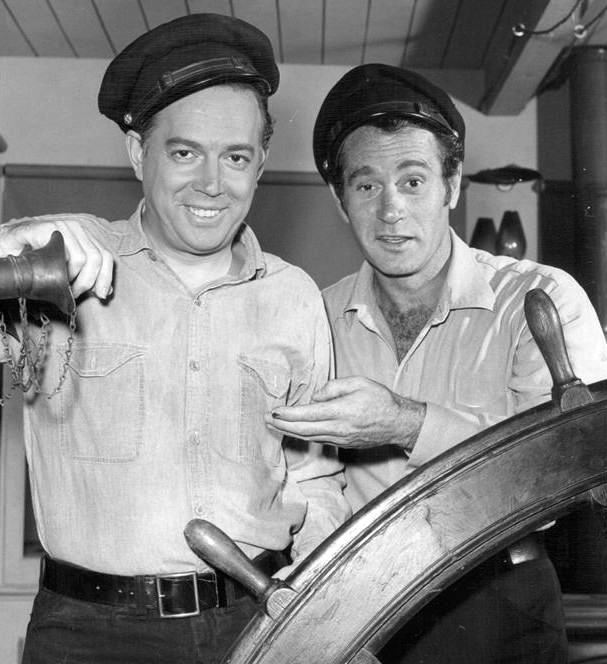
Darren McGavin (right) makes his second appearance as Arthur Dales in the episode.

=== Writing ===
"Agua Mala", which was written by David Amann (making it his second story for The X-Files after "Terms of Endearment"), went through several very different drafts. Amann was originally tasked with bringing back the character of Arthur Dales, and his first story revolved around a monster lurking in an abandoned gold mine. Frank Spotnitz, the show's executive producer, was not drawn to the mine aspect, but he enjoyed the concept of a monster running amok in an enclosed space. Amann subsequently redeveloped the idea, setting the episode during a hurricane and featuring a sea monster as the primary antagonist. Originally, the sea monster was blown onto dry land and crawled into the building before Amann decided to re-write it as living water.

Director Rob Bowman was worried that the episode's monster would not be "scary" and thus the story would not be "compelling". Bowman therefore used unique camera angles and quick cuts to make the episode feel "a hell of a lot better than [he] was afraid it might". The monster itself was created by special effects makeup supervisor John Vulich, a task he considered "the single most difficult thing [he] did all season". The tentacles were created out of a combination of silicone and urethane. The "octopus bite marks" numbered in the hundreds and required 90 minutes to apply.

The episode's title, "Agua Mala", means bad water in Spanish. Aguamala is also the slang name for the Portuguese Man o' War, a venomous jellyfish similar in form to the episode's primary antagonist.

=== Casting ===
Darren McGavin appears in this episode as Arthur Dales, making this his second episode in the series after being introduced in "Travelers". McGavin, noted for his role in Kolchak: The Night Stalker, was originally the casting directors' first choice for the role of Senator Matheson in the second season episode "Little Green Men". McGavin was later sought out to play the role of Mulder's dad. In the end, McGavin finally agreed to appear on the show playing Arthur Dales, the agent who founded the X-Files. McGavin was also slated to appear in the Duchovny-penned episode "The Unnatural", but two days into production, he suffered a stroke, forcing the producers to remove his scenes and replace them with another "Arthur Dales", played by M. Emmet Walsh.

=== Filming ===
The episode was notable both for the amount of water required and for its near-lack of vibrant light. Regarding the latter, Bowman did not film "anything for that episode during daylight, or with anything brighter than a flashlight or an emergency lamp in the hallway". the director also explained that "Agua Mala" was difficult to film because when a crew or cast member got too wet, they "had to stop everything to dry them off". Gillian Anderson and David Duchovny, in particular, were "water-logged" for a majority of the episode's filming. Anderson later joked, "I mean, we got drenched. It was like we were back in Vancouver!" (The show had previously filmed in Vancouver from season one to five before moving to Los Angeles, California, at the beginning of the sixth season.) During filming, costume designer Christine Peters was required to bring six dry replicas of each character's wardrobe to prevent pneumonia.

The apartment featured in the episode was built from scratch on a sound stage. Production designer Corey Kaplan received the script for "Agua Mala" around Christmas and, realizing the amount of work, immediately began drawing up plans for the set. When production for the episode wrapped, the entire set was thrown away because it had been ruined by the water.

== Reception ==
=== Ratings ===
"Agua Mala" first aired in the United States on February 21, 1999. This episode earned a Nielsen rating of 10.1, meaning that roughly 10.1 percent of all television-equipped households were tuned in to the episode. It was viewed by 16.90 million viewers. The episode aired in the United Kingdom and Ireland on Sky1 on June 6, 1999, and received 0.95 million viewers, making it the third most watched episode that week.

=== Reviews ===
The episode received mixed to negative reviews from critics. Michael Liedtke and George Avalos, in a review of the sixth season in The Charlotte Observer, called the episode "just plain bad". Emily VanDerWerff of The A.V. Club roundly criticized the episode and awarded it a "D−", calling it "a famously bad episode of The X-Files." She noted that "the worst thing about 'Agua Mala' is that it comes so very, very close to working that it's frustrating to see just how little it actually does" due to its bizarre structure and convoluted antagonist. VanDerWerff criticized Darren McGavin's appearance in the episode, calling it a "glorified cameo", and noted that his character functions as the "kind of old man who stands on his porch and yells about the good old days to the neighborhood kids." She did however, call the shot of the "writhing tentacle in the overhead lamp" the "one good thing" in the episode. Robert Shearman, in his book Wanting to Believe: A Critical Guide to The X-Files, Millennium & The Lone Gunmen, rated the episode one-and-a-half stars out of five, writing that the episode's "laughs aren't clever, and the scares are silly".

Not all reviews were completely negative; others were more mixed. Tom Kessenich, in his book Examination: An Unauthorized Look at Seasons 6–9 of the X-Files gave the episode a mixed review, writing "as far as [Monsters of the Weeks] go, 'Agua Mala' was pretty standard fare." However, he criticized the episodes resolution, noting that Scully should have had no way to know pure water would kill the creature. Paula Vitaris from Cinefantastique gave the episode a mixed review and awarded it two stars out of four. Vitaris wrote that, "'Agua Mala' won't end up on anybody's 'best of' list, but it's so silly that it's sort of fun." Timothy Sexton from Yahoo! News named "The Hurricane Monster" as one of "The Best X-Files Monsters of the Week", writing, "I'll tell you one thing about this X-Files episode and this X-Files monster: you'll never go to the bathroom during a rainstorm again without thinking twice."

=== Awards ===
"Agua Mala" earned an ASC Award by the American Society of Cinematographers for Outstanding Achievement in Cinematography – Regular Series.

== See also ==
- List of unmade episodes of The X-Files

== Bibliography ==
- Kessenich, Tom (2002). Examination: An Unauthorized Look at Seasons 6–9 of the X-Files. Trafford Publishing. ISBN 1-55369-812-6.
- Lowry, Brian (1995). The Truth is Out There: The Official Guide to the X-Files. Harper Prism. ISBN 0-06-105330-9.
- Meisler, Andy (2000). The End and the Beginning: The Official Guide to the X-Files Season 6. HarperCollins. ISBN 0-06-107595-7.
- Shearman, Robert (2009). Wanting to Believe: A Critical Guide to The X-Files, Millennium & The Lone Gunmen. Mad Norwegian Press. ISBN 978-0-9759446-9-1.
