= All Souls (The X-Files) =

- The X-Files episode
- The lion-headed part of a Seraph, as seen by Dana Scully. The effect, created via CGI, was completed hours before airtime.
- Episode no.: Season 5 Episode 17
- Directed by: Allen Coulter
- Story by: Dan Angel; Billy Brown
- Teleplay by: Frank Spotnitz; John Shiban
- Production code: 5X17
- Original air date: April 26, 1998
- Running time: 45 minutes

Guest appearances
- Arnie Walters as Father McCue; Patti Allan as Mrs. Kernoff; Eric Keenleyside as Lance Kernof; Emily Perkins as the Nephilim; Jody Racicot as Father Gregory; Lorraine Landry as Vicki Belon; Glenn Morshower as Aaron Starkey; Lauren Diewold as Emily; Bob Wilde as George Vincent Dyer; Tim O'Halloran as the Sergeant; Tracy Elofson as Seraphim

Episode chronology
← Previous "Mind's Eye"	Next → "The Pine Bluff Variant"
- The X-Files season 5

"All Souls" is the seventeenth episode of the fifth season of the American science fiction television series The X-Files. The episode originally aired on the Fox network on April 26, 1998. The episode's teleplay was written by Frank Spotnitz and John Shiban, from a story by Dan Angel and Billy Brown; it was directed by Allen Coulter. The episode is a "Monster-of-the-Week" story, a stand-alone plot which is unconnected to the mythology, or overarching fictional history, of The X-Files. "All Souls" received a Nielsen household rating of 8.5 and was watched by 13.44 million viewers in its initial broadcast. It received mixed reviews from television critics.

The show centers on FBI special agents Fox Mulder (David Duchovny) and Dana Scully (Gillian Anderson) who work on cases linked to the paranormal, called X-Files. In this episode, the unexplained death of mentally and physically disabled girl prompts Father McCue (Arnie Walters) to ask Scully for her help, but her investigation leads her to a mystery involving Nephilim—children of mortal women and angels. Scully soon learns that Aaron Starkey (Glenn Morshower), a department of social services worker and demon in disguise, is after the girls, in order that the Devil may control their power.

The original version of "All Souls" was a simple story about Mulder, Scully, and angels. Shiban and Spotnitz, however, overhauled the idea and added elements extrapolated from the season's earlier "Christmas Carol" and "Emily" two-parter, making "All Souls" the "unofficial third part" of its story arc. The entry also contained several elaborate effects, which were achieved via makeup and CGI. After they viewed the final cut of the installment, Shiban and Spotnitz decided to frame the action around Scully confessing her story to a priest in a confessional.

== Plot ==
In Alexandria, Virginia, sixteen-year-old Dara Kernof (Emily Perkins), a mentally and physically disabled girl who uses a wheelchair, somehow manages to leave her house in the middle of the night, soon after her baptism. Her father, Lance (Eric Keenleyside), eventually finds her outside with her arms raised upwards towards a strange figure. Suddenly, lightning flashes and the figure disappears. When Lance reaches Dara, he realizes she is dead and her eyes have been burned out. Eventually, Dana Scully (Gillian Anderson) is contacted by Father McCue (Arnie Walters), who asks if she would be willing to assist the family in figuring out what exactly happened. Soon thereafter, Scully visits the Kernofs and learns that Dara was adopted. Given her severe spinal deformities, Scully is unable to explain how Dara walked, let alone got outside. Lance then tells Scully that he saw a strange figure before her; he confides in her that he thinks the mysterious being was the Devil.

While this is going on, a priest named Father Gregory (Jody Racicot) visits a hospital to visit Dara's twin, Paula Koklos (Perkins), but he is stopped by a social worker named Aaron Starkey (Glenn Morshower). That night, Paula dies mysteriously when a man enters her room. Fox Mulder (David Duchovny) soon learns that Paula and Dara were not twins, but rather two of four quadruplets. The agents also learn that Father Gregory was hoping to adopt Paula and they visit the priest. Gregory protests that he is innocent and was simply trying to protect Paula by taking her under his wing. Later, Scully experiences a vision of her daughter Emily (Lauren Diewold).

Mulder soon learns the identity of another sister (Perkins), who is troubled and homeless. With Starkey's help, Mulder finds the girl in a rundown part of the city, but the figure from the beginning of the episode kills her before Mulder can get to her. Mulder discovers Father Gregory at the scene and believes that he is the perpetrator of the crimes. Under questioning by Mulder and Scully, Father Gregory insists that he was attempting to ward off the Devil, who was hoping to claim the girls' souls. He is adamant that the fourth and final sister must be located. Later, when the agents have left the room, Starkey enters and asks for the whereabouts of this last girl. Gregory remains silent and soon begins to burn; it is revealed that Starkey is the Devil.

That night, the figure from the beginning of the episode presents itself to Scully, revealing that it is a Seraph. This seraph had fathered four nephilim (i.e. the disabled quadruplets) and God sent the angel to earth to return the girls to Heaven. The angel is attempting to outmaneuver the Devil, who hopes to use the girls' souls for his own nefarious plots. Scully and Starkey later find the fourth girl, Roberta Dyer (Perkins) at Gregory's church. However, Scully sees that Starkey has a horned shadow, revealing his true origins. As Scully tries to help Roberta escape, the women are confronted by the Seraph. Scully reluctantly lets go of Roberta's hand, after seeing Emily in place of Roberta, and lets Roberta enter Heaven.

== Production ==
=== Writing ===
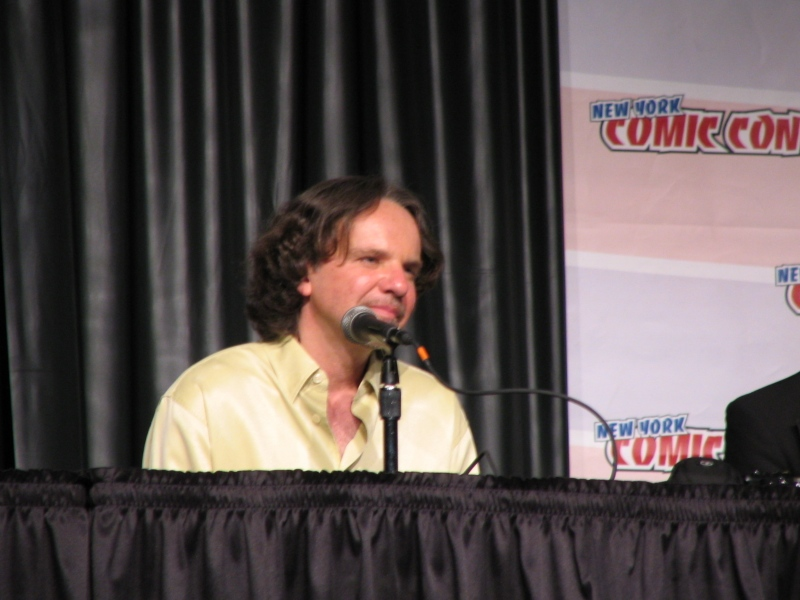
Frank Spotnitz wrote the episode, along with John Shiban.

The script for "All Souls" was written by John Shiban and Frank Spotnitz, and directed by Allen Coulter. The original genesis for the episode was an idea developed by Dan Angel and Billy Brown, two story board editors for the series that had left after Christmas of 1997. In this incarnation, the plot was radically different; according to Shiban, the story was "about Mulder and Scully and angels, but it never quite worked the way it was originally conceived." Shiban and Spotnitz decided to overhaul the script and feature elements of the earlier "Christmas Carol" and "Emily" story arc, as the writers wanted to include the "very universal" idea of Scully exploring feelings for her deceased daughter. This episode, according to Andy Meisler, thus became the "unofficial third part" in the story. With this episode, Scully dons the role of the believer, whereas Mulder plays the skeptic. This "Mulder-Scully criss-cross" accentuated a major theme for the fifth season.

In order to counter some of the darker aspects of the script, Shiban and Spotnitz—on the behest of co-star David Duchovny—added several lines of comic relief, delivered by Mulder. According to Duchvony, "It was in the more straight ahead investigative shows, the creepier, scarier shows, that I would try to make sure that we kept this kind of humanity alive through humor".

=== Filming ===
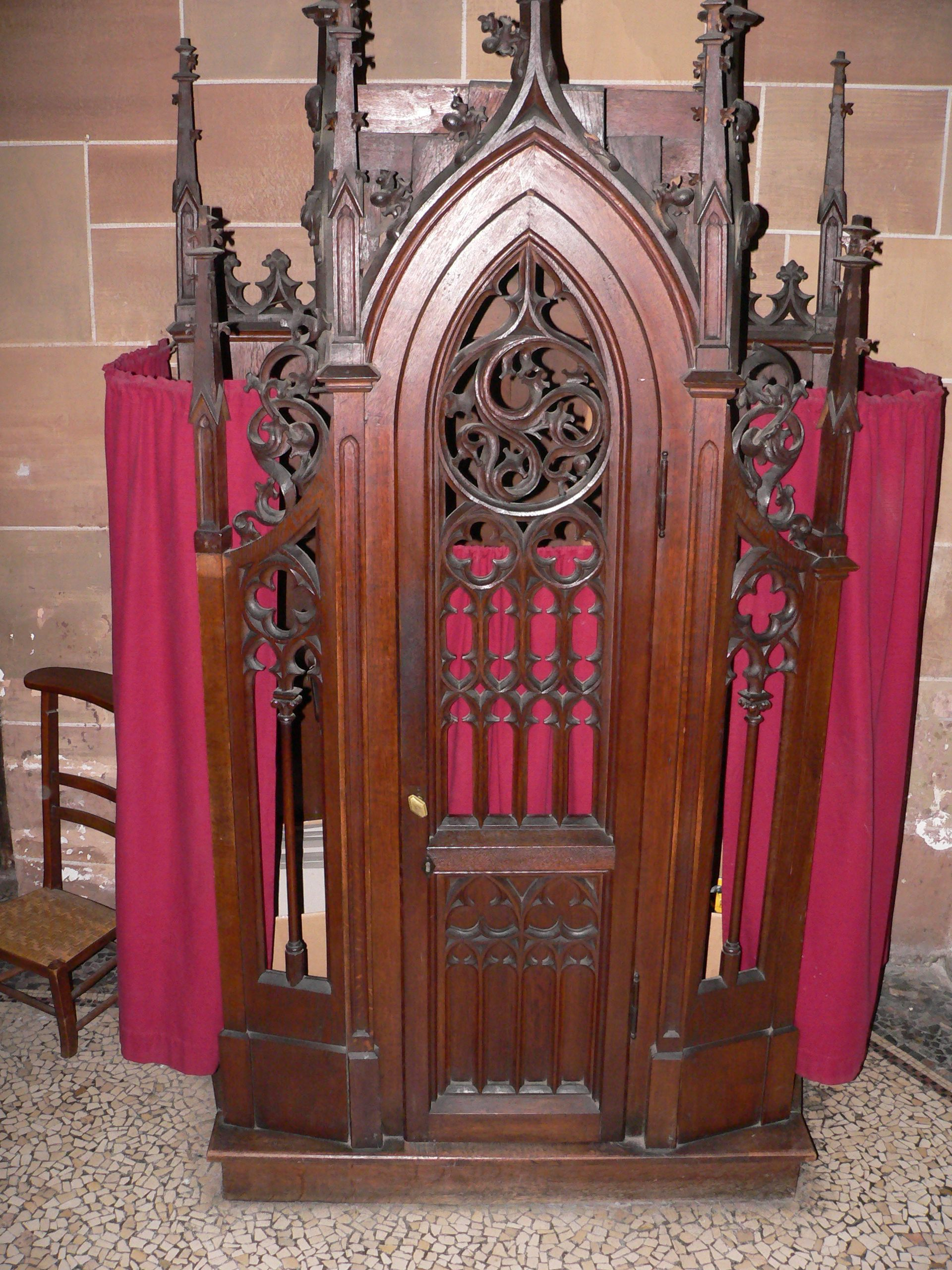
Shiban and Spotnitz decided to frame the action of the episode around Scully confessing to a priest (confessional pictured).

Scenes at "St. John's Church"—the church featured in the episode—were shot in the actual St. Augustine Church in Vancouver, British Columbia. Prior to filming, the script for the episode was approved by the church's local Monseigneur. As a fail-safe, the production crew scouted several other churches in case permissions were rescinded. Special stained glass windows were created that featured an angel ascending into Heaven, to go along with the themes of the episode. The book that Father McCue has about Nephilim was created by assistant art director Vivien Nishi with guidance from Spotnitz. Scenes at Father Gregory's church were filmed in an older boiler room at George Pearson Hospital. This location had previously been used in the earlier fifth season entry "Kitsunegari" as a cafeteria. The production crew initially worried that the building's high windows would bring in too much natural light and so some of the windows were lit up via artificial means.

The episode contained several elaborate effects, which were achieved via makeup or CGI. Makeup artist Laverne Basham and hairstylist Anji Bemben were tasked with giving each of the quadruplets, all played by Emily Perkins, a different look. They were also responsible for making Jody Racicot appear older, which proved particularly difficult given that Racicot did not have any hair that they could dye grey and he had "the tightest skin of any thirtysomething guy [they'd] ever seen." The visual effects to create the shifting heads of the Seraphim were created with CGI, which visual effects supervisor Laurie Kallsen-George finalized only "hours before airtime." The scene was created by having actor Tracy Elofson wear a lion mask to track the scene. Then, the different heads were filmed against a green screen and composited. Various light effects were then interlaid to "make it look scary" and more "angelic".

After watching a rough cut of the episode, Shiban and Spotnitz decided that they were "far from the end". Feeling that something was missing, the two decided to frame the happenings of the episode with two scenes featuring Scully in a church confessional. Vancouver producer J. P. Finn was chosen to play the priest, due to his "hushed delivery and map-of-Ireland features". Initially, Gillian Anderson had been given the script for these scenes days in advance. On the day of filming, however, she was sent a number of rewrites and subsequently demanded more time to become familiar with the new script, so as to not rush or undermine the emotion she was supposed to put into the scene. The crew ended up shooting a day later. Due to this, Finn never actually filmed with Anderson. In order to make up for the addition of the church scenes, the first cut of the episode had to be trimmed "scene by scene and line by line".

== Broadcast and reception ==
"All Souls" premiered on the Fox network in the United States on April 26, 1998. It earned a Nielsen household rating of 8.5, with a 12 share, meaning that roughly 8.5 percent of all television-equipped households, and 12 percent of households watching television, were tuned in to the episode. It was viewed by 13.44 million viewers.

"All Souls" received mixed reviews from television critics. Dave Golder from SFX magazine named the episode's Nephilim as among of the top "10 TV Angels". He applauded the episode's role-switching, allowing Scully to be the believer and Mulder to be the skeptic. Emily St. James of The A.V. Club wrote positively of the episode and awarded it a "B+". Despite calling the entry "an occasionally too-slow episode", St. James praised Anderson, lauding her performance as "another […] potential Emmy tape in a season full of them". Furthermore, she enjoyed the juxtaposition of Scully's skepticism and her religious beliefs, noting that the series could have taken the idea into the realm of irony, but instead played it "with a deathly seriousness" that allowed it to work.

Other reviews were more negative. Paula Vitaris from Cinefantastique gave the episode a largely critical review and awarded it one star out of four. Vitaris wrote "with its trip into blatant religiosity, 'All Souls' comes off like a bad episode of Millennium". Furthermore, she was critical of the scenes wherein the Nephilims' souls were taken, noting the excessive religious imagery: "as [Dara's] soul is taken, the camera pans to the right and stops to linger on a telephone pole that forms a cross." Robert Shearman and Lars Pearson, in their book Wanting to Believe: A Critical Guide to The X-Files, Millennium & The Lone Gunmen, rated the episode one star out of five. The two derided the fact that the episode's killer appears to either be God or an angel commanded by God, along with the fact that the four girls are destined to die because they are disabled and "have no right to live". Furthermore, Shearman and Pearson concluded that, while religious worship is not a passive act, it is treated so in the episode. Ultimately, they concluded that while "looking at death from a different angle is fascinating" it would be explored better "in 'Closure'."

== Bibliography ==
- Gradnitzer, Louisa; Pittson, Todd (1999). X Marks the Spot: On Location with The X-Files. Arsenal Pulp Press. ISBN 1-55152-066-4.
- Hurwitz, Matt; Knowles, Chris (2008). The Complete X-Files: Behind the Series the Myths and the Movies. New York, U.S.: Insight Editions. ISBN 978-1933784724.
- Meisler, Andy (1999), Resist or Serve: The Official Guide to The X-Files, Vol. 4, London: HarperCollins, ISBN 0-00-257133-1
- Shearman, Robert; Pearson, Lars (2009). Wanting to Believe: A Critical Guide to The X-Files, Millennium & The Lone Gunmen. Mad Norwegian Press. ISBN 978-0975944691.
