= Chinga (The X-Files) =

- The X-Files episode
- The doll is incinerated in the microwave. Despite mixed critical reviews, several of the episode's scenes, such as this one, were praised by critics for their creepiness.
- Episode no.: Season 5 Episode 10
- Directed by: Kim Manners
- Written by: Stephen King; Chris Carter
- Production code: 5X10
- Original air date: February 8, 1998
- Running time: 44 minutes

Guest appearances
- Susannah Hoffman as Melissa Turner; Jenny-Lynn Hutcheson as Polly Turner; Carolyn Tweedle as Jane Froelich; Gordan Tipple as Assistant Manager; Harrison Coe as Dave the Butcher; Larry Musser as Jack Bonsaint; William MacDonald as Buddy Riggs; Dean Wray as Rich Turner; Henry Beckman as Old Man; Ian Robison as Ranger; Tracy Lively as Clerk; Elizabeth McCarthy as Shopper; Sean Benbow as Customer

Episode chronology
← Previous "Schizogeny"	Next → "Kill Switch"
- The X-Files season 5

"Chinga" is the tenth episode of the fifth season of the American science fiction television series The X-Files. It was written by noted author Stephen King and series creator Chris Carter, and directed by Kim Manners. The episode aired in the United States on February 8, 1998, on the Fox network. The episode is a "Monster-of-the-Week" story, a stand-alone plot which is unconnected to the series' wider mythology. "Chinga" earned a Nielsen rating of 12.8 and was viewed by 21.33 million viewers. The episode received mixed reviews from television critics.

The show centers on FBI special agents Fox Mulder (David Duchovny) and Dana Scully (Gillian Anderson) who work on cases linked to the paranormal, called X-Files. Mulder is a believer in the paranormal, while the skeptical Scully has been assigned to debunk his work. In this episode, Scully takes a vacation to Maine, where she encounters a bizarre case where the victims appear to have inflicted wounds upon themselves—apparently at the behest of a strange young girl.

"Chinga" was co-written by noted horror author Stephen King after he asked to pen an episode of The X-Files. Carter rewrote portions of King's final draft, resulting in a shared writing credit for the entry. The supermarket shots were filmed in an actual supermarket, a first for the series, according to art director Greg Loewen. Chinga, the titular evil doll, was created by sewing together various doll parts, including an oversized head and a wig created from multiple hairpieces.

== Plot ==
In Ammas Beach, Maine, Melissa Turner and her young daughter Polly go to the store; Polly carries with her an old doll that she calls "Chinga". Customers watch Polly and her mother, and Polly doesn't like it. Suddenly, Melissa sees a phantasmal vision of the store's butcher, Dave, on the edge of death. Melissa, terrified, decides to leave, but suddenly everyone in the store begins to claw at their eyes. Meanwhile, Dave, after seeing a monstrous reflection of Chinga, is compelled by an outside force to stab himself in the eye, killing himself.

Dana Scully (Gillian Anderson) is coincidentally in the area on vacation, and, after stumbling upon the carnage in the store, telephones Fox Mulder (David Duchovny). Mulder, true to character, speculates that it might have been caused by dark magic or witchcraft. Scully dismisses Mulder's hypothesis and instead decides to watch the store's closed-circuit television recordings to gain a better understanding of what happened. She notices that, of all the customers in the store, only Melissa and Polly are not compelled to injure themselves. The police chief of Ammas Beach, Jack Bonsaint, offhandedly mentions that Melissa is rumored to practice witchcraft.

Bonsaint tells Scully that Melissa had formerly been married to a local fisherman, but he was killed when a hook on his winch ripped through his skull. Later, it is revealed that he found Chinga in a lobster trap and gave it to Polly as a present before he died. Bonsaint also reveals that a daycare teacher named Jane Froelich had once slapped Polly over her behavior. Meanwhile, Melissa and Polly meet with her friend, Buddy Riggs, a police deputy, at an ice cream shop. Melissa confides in Riggs that she has been having horrific visions of people dying. Riggs is startled and suggests that Melissa and Polly use his cabin to get away from Ammas Beach. While Riggs and Melissa chat, Polly asks one of the workers for more cherries on her ice cream, but the worker insists that she needs to pay for them. Just then, the worker's hair gets caught in the mixer, but Riggs saves her from death.

Scully and Bonsaint visit Froelich, who accuses Melissa of being the scion of a witch family. She also claims that Melissa has passed her evil onto Polly. Meanwhile, while heading out to Riggs' cabin, Melissa sees a bloody image of Froelich and decides to return to Ammas Beach to save Froelich. While Melissa races back, Froelich is confronted by the enlarged Chinga and is forced to kill herself with a shard of a phonograph record. Soon thereafter, Melissa sees a vision of Riggs, and as expected, the deputy is forced to bludgeon himself to death with his own nightstick. At her home, Melissa has a final vision, this time seeing herself with a hammer embedded in her head. She decides to end the madness once and for all by burning Chinga. However, the doll somehow manages to extinguish the matches that Melissa lights.

Scully and Bonsaint drive to Melissa's house and witness Melissa manically trying to burn her house down—with her, her daughter, and Chinga all trapped inside. Chinga eventually overpowers Melissa, forcing her to grab hold of a hammer and beat herself. Scully and Bonsaint burst into the house, and Scully quickly tosses the Chinga doll into a microwave, where it bursts into flames and melts. The power over Melissa is lifted and she stops beating herself. In the final scene, a fisherman is seen pulling up a lobster trap, inside of which is the burned doll.

== Production ==
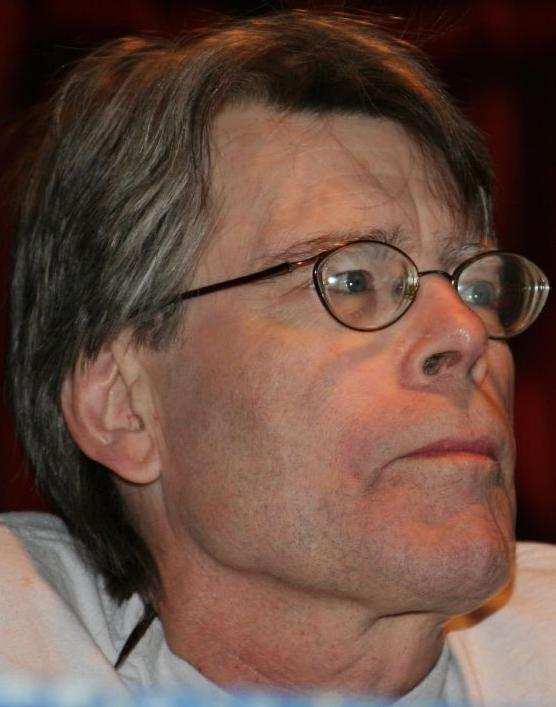
"Chinga" was co-written by noted author Stephen King.

The episode was co-written by horror author Stephen King. King initially approached series co-star David Duchovny and informed him that he was a fan of the show and wanted to work on an episode. After contacting series creator Chris Carter, he was hired as a guest writer (after first being offered the chance to write an episode of Millennium). During the writing process, King worked remotely at his home in Maine, sending drafts of the script for Carter to rewrite. Carter heavily edited the story, because, as he explained, "Stephen wasn't used to writing for Mulder and Scully [...] the Mulder-and-Scully story in his original draft didn't quite work". Carter helped finalize the draft, with one of his biggest changes being the separation of Mulder and Scully. Kim Manners, the director for the episode, later said, "I was very excited to be able to direct a Stephen King piece, and when it was all said and done, there was very little Stephen King left in it. The nuts and bolts were his, but that was really one of Chris' scripts."

During filming, Gillian Anderson struggled with delivering her lines. She explained, "The way the script was originally read to me, initially seemed to me as if Scully kind of stepped up to the plate and played along with the sheriff's humor". Thus, she performed her lines in a "tongue in cheek" manner before Carter called her and told her that her lines were not meant to be humorous; he also informed her that the production staff was having to "edit out a lot of stuff" to correct the issue.

Several of the episode's scenes were shot on location. For instance, the gas station scene was filmed at a real gas station across from the series' production headquarters. Likewise, the supermarket scenes were filmed in a real store named "Shop Easy" located in Port Coquitlam. The scenes required the supermarket to close before the Christmas holiday and be installed with up-right freezers. Reportedly, during the self-mutilation scene in the supermarket, a real customer stumbled onto the set, saw the commotion, and hurriedly left in a panic. The "Death Under Glass" scene featuring Dave the Butcher with a knife in his eye was created in post-production with the help of a computer. Special effects supervisor Laurie Kellsen-George tested the scene on her nine- and eleven-year-old sons, explaining, "I gauge a lot of the show by whether my kids can stand them or not. If they can't, I figure I succeeded [...] 'Chinga' bothered them a lot."

Chinga, the titular evil doll, was created by sewing together various doll parts. An oversized doll's head was then attached to the body and fitted with "the world's largest wig". Unbeknownst to either Carter or King, the word "Chinga" is a colloquial Spanish swear word. Most of the makeup effects were created by artist Toby Lindala, who "appreciated the chance to [work on] a Stephen King project".

== Reception ==
"Chinga" premiered on the Fox network in the United States on February 8, 1998. It earned a Nielsen rating of 12.8, with an 18 share, meaning that roughly 12.7 percent of all television-equipped households, and 18 percent of households watching television, were tuned in to the episode. It was viewed by 21.33 million viewers. The episode later debuted in the United Kingdom on Sky One on April 19, 1998. However, because the title "Chinga" is a Mexican-Spanish swear word "equivalent to 'fuck' and in very common usage", the episode was retitled "Bunghoney" when it aired in the UK.

"Chinga" received mixed reviews from critics. Anna Redman of HELLO! Canada was positive toward the episode, and referred to it as "one of the series' best episodes". Erin McCann of The Guardian listed "Chinga" as one of the "13 best X-Files episodes ever". Zack Handlen from The A.V. Club gave a mixed review, awarded it a C−, and called it an episode that "seems like one of those ideas that sounds really, really great until someone thinks about for more than a minute." Handlen argued that King was a wrong fit for The X-Files and that the resultant script was King "being asked to marry his voice to Carter's". He derided the plot and wrote that it was written "like someone (Darin Morgan, only not funny at all) doing a parody for the most familiar King tropes." Handlen, however, did praise the violence in the episode, noting that he is "a sucker for gore", but ultimately called the episode "lousy".

Robert Shearman and Lars Pearson, in their book Wanting to Believe: A Critical Guide to The X-Files, Millennium & The Lone Gunmen, rated the episode two-and-a-half stars out of five and called it "clumsy". The two argued that the premise of "Chinga" would have been better suited to a book or short story, as is King's forte. However, its translation to television resulted in an episode "so on the nose, it makes you wince." Despite this, Shearman and Pearson complimented Carter's rewrites as well as the various jokes thrown throughout the episode. Paula Vitaris from Cinefantastique gave the episode a largely negative review and awarded it one star out of four. She called the entry "a major disappointment" and wrote that it "isn't scary in the least". Vitaris even argued that "it's unintentionally funny" and that the scenes with Mulder that are supposed to play as humor do not. Vitaris wrote that the episode was like the third season entry "Pusher", except with less focus; ultimately, the episode degenerates into "watching people get killed in various gruesome ways while Scully and Vonsant finally collect enough information […] in the nick of time."

Despite the lackluster reception the episode garnered, several critics considered the entry scary. Katie Anderson from Cinefantastique named the scene wherein Dave the Butcher kills himself as the eighth "Scariest Moment" in The X-Files. Television Without Pity named the episode the ninth "Most Nightmare-Inducing" episode of the series, noting that "[t]his Stephen King-penned episode is your classic demonic doll story."

== See also ==
- Killer toys

== Bibliography ==
- Cornell, Paul; Day, Martin, Topping, Keith (1998). X-Treme Possibilities. Virgin Publications, Ltd. ISBN 9780753502280.
- Gradnitzer, Louisa; Pittson, Todd (1999). X Marks the Spot: On Location with The X-Files. Arsenal Pulp Press. ISBN 1-55152-066-4.
- Hurwitz, Matt; Knowles, Chris (2008). The Complete X-Files: Behind the Series the Myths and the Movies. New York, US: Insight Editions. ISBN 978-1933784724.
- Meisler, Andy (1999), Resist or Serve: The Official Guide to The X-Files, Vol. 4, London: HarperCollins, ISBN 0-00-257133-1
- Shearman, Robert; Pearson, Lars (2009). Wanting to Believe: A Critical Guide to The X-Files, Millennium & The Lone Gunmen. Mad Norwegian Press. ISBN 978-0975944691.
