= Schizogeny =

- The X-Files episode
- Episode no.: Season 5 Episode 9
- Directed by: Ralph Hemecker
- Written by: Jessica Scott; Mike Wollaeger
- Production code: 5X09
- Original air date: January 11, 1998
- Running time: 44 minutes

Guest appearances
- Christin Anton as Teacher; Bob Dawson as Phil Rich; Myles Ferguson as Joey Agostino; Cynde Harmon as Patti Rich; Katharine Isabelle as Lisa Baiocchi; George Josef as John Ramirez; Chad Lindberg as Bobby Rich; Gardiner Millar as Eugene Baiocchi; Laurie Murdoch as Coroner; Sarah-Jane Redmond as Karin Matthews; Kate Robbins as Linda Baiocchi

Episode chronology
← Previous "Kitsunegari"	Next → "Chinga"
- The X-Files season 5

"Schizogeny" is the ninth episode of the fifth season of the science fiction television series The X-Files. It premiered on the Fox network on January 11, 1998. It was written by Jessica Scott and Mike Wollaeger, directed by Ralph Hemecker, and featured guest appearances by Bob Dawson, Myles Ferguson, Katharine Isabelle, Chad Lindberg, and Sarah-Jane Redmond. The episode is a "Monster-of-the-Week" story, unconnected to the series' wider mythology. "Schizogeny" earned a Nielsen household rating of 12.9, being watched by 21.37 million people in its initial broadcast. The episode received mixed to negative reviews, with several critics calling it the worst episode of The X-Files.

The show centers on FBI special agents Fox Mulder (David Duchovny) and Dana Scully (Gillian Anderson) who work on cases linked to the paranormal, called X-Files. Mulder is a believer in the paranormal, while the skeptical Scully has been assigned to debunk his work. In this episode, Mulder and Scully become convinced that a greater evil may be lurking in the community when a teenager is suspected of murdering his stepfather.

"Schizogeny", written by first-year staff writers Scott and Wollaeger, became humorously known as "The Killer Tree Episode" amongst the cast and crew. Many of the scenes shot for "Schizogeny" were filmed on a real orchard named Hazelgrove Farms near the small town of Fort Langley, British Columbia. The episode utilized various post-production techniques, in order to clear up vocal issues and to censor one line, which Fox's standards and practices department had issues with.

== Plot ==
In Coats Grove, Michigan, a teenager with anger management issues named Bobby Rich gets into an argument with his stepfather Phil about yard work. Bobby eventually darts into a nearby orchard to evade Phil, but the latter gives chase. Later, Bobby's mother Patti enters into the orchard and finds Phil dying, his body sinking into a mud puddle. A terrified Bobby is next to the body.

Fox Mulder (David Duchovny) and Dana Scully (Gillian Anderson) investigate the crime. Scully believes that Bobby killed his stepdad by luring him into a pit trap. Patti repudiates this hypothesis, arguing that when she arrived it looked like Bobby was trying to help Phil rather than harm him. Mulder and Scully meet with Bobby's therapist, Karin Matthews, who tells them that the boy has been physically abused. Despite the evidence to the contrary, Mulder begins to believe that Bobby is innocent.

Bobby meets up with his classmate Lisa Baiocchi. Just like Bobby, Lisa attends therapy sessions with Matthews as her father Eugene is abusive, Bobby tells Lisa that she should not take any more abuse from Eugene. When Lisa returns home her father angrily tells her to stop seeing Bobby. Suddenly a mysterious arm-like appendage bursts through the window and yanks him outside. The next day Scully examines the body and concludes that he was pushed out of the window. Mulder however, thinks he was pulled.

While examining Eugene's corpse Mulder finds a splinter in his neck, the wood of which matches the trees outside his house. While they continue to investigate the crime Mulder and Scully are approached by a mysterious man (George Josef) who claims that a "bad man" is killing the area's trees and that this had happened 20 years earlier. The blight had stopped when the bad man was killed. While this is happening, Matthews takes Lisa to her house claiming that she is protecting her. After Lisa overhears Matthews arguing with a man she journeys into Matthews' root cellar where she finds a corpse. When she tries to leave she finds she has been locked in.

Mulder later discovers that Matthews' father was retrieved from a mud puddle twenty years before the events of the episode. He begins to suspect her of wrongdoing — suspicion that is furthered after he digs up her father's grave and finds no body but a coffin full of tree roots.

Lisa's aunt journeys to Matthews' house to retrieve her niece, but is killed by Matthews who is revealed to have a split personality engendered by abuse from her own father. This has also given her power to control the trees in the area. Mulder and Scully later search Matthews' house and find the mysterious corpse in the basement pinned to the wall by tree roots — who they realize is the body of Matthews's father — as well as an unharmed Lisa. Meanwhile, Matthews goes to Bobby's house and chases him into the orchard. The agents show up soon thereafter and both Mulder and Bobby are nearly drowned in mud. The mysterious man suddenly appears and cuts Matthews' head off with an axe, ending her power over the trees.

== Production ==
=== Conception and writing ===
"Schizogeny" was written by Jessica Scott and Mike Wollaeger, their first episode for the series. Due to it being Scot and Wollaeger's first episode, "Schizogeny" took a long time to write and, according to executive producer Frank Spotnitz, "went through many, many incarnations and versions." Due to the episode's plot and setting, it became sardonically known as "The Killer Tree Episode" among the cast and crew. The episode's title is a biological term for the creation of cavities by separating out existing cells.

=== Casting ===
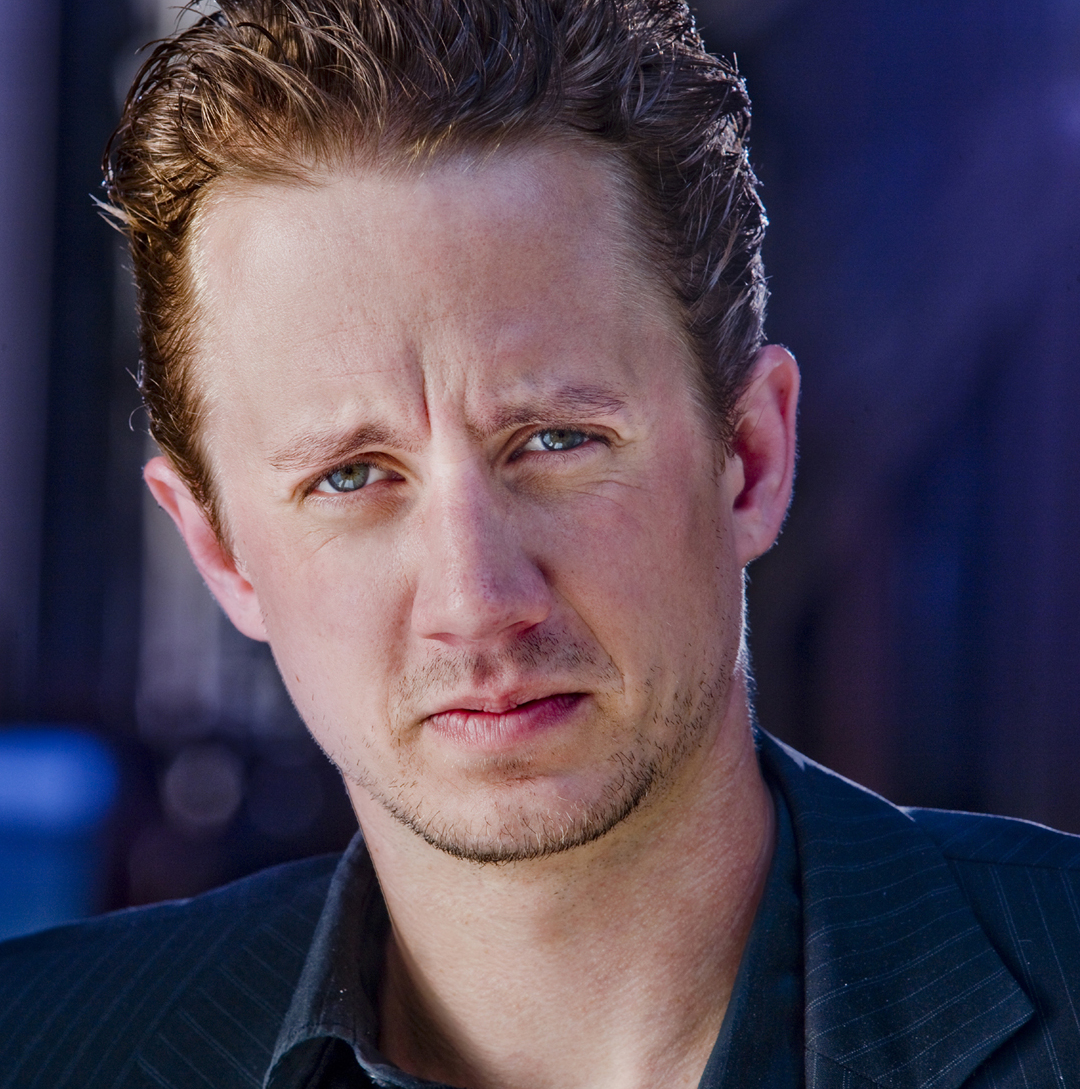
Chad Lindberg was cast as Bobby Rich.

Katharine Isabelle, who portrayed Lisa Baiocchi, was the daughter of Graeme Murray, the production designer for The X-Files. Kate Robbins, who played Lisa's aunt Linda, had previously appeared in the third season episode "D.P.O." Chad Lindberg was cast as Bobby Rich, and when the episode was being edited, there was worry that his delivery was not pronounced enough, so many of his lines were later dubbed in a studio. David Duchovny, too, was required to overdub a line: during the scene in which Mulder tells Scully Bobby's nickname, Duchovny originally said "Dickweed". Fox's standards and practices department objected to the term and made the show change the name to "Dorkweed".

=== Set and score ===
While much of "Schizogeny" was filmed on a real orchard named Hazelgrove Farms near Fort Langley, British Columbia, the sinking mud scenes were shot on a soundstage at Lion's Gate Studios that was fitted with over 200 hazelnut trees. The mud pit was made out of a large tank filled with soil, Sphagnum moss, and water. The mixture was heated so that the actors would not be cold while filming. The shot that called for Karin Matthews' lifeless body to sink into the mud required a stunt woman to be slowly lowered into the pit, which necessitated the crew supplying her with oxygen, given how deep the tank was. Toby Lindala and his art department created all of the props used in the episode, including the moving tree roots and the corpse of Karin Matthews' father.

Several of the shooting locations were chosen because of their proximity to large trees. Lisa's house, for instance, was next to a large willow, which was fitted with a fake tree limb twenty feet long to give it a more menacing feel. The tree limb that attacks Mulder's car was a branch from a tree that had broken off and fallen on government land. The producers secured permission from the Canadian government to retrieve the branch, and then hoisted it into the air before dropping it onto a retired police car. After the stunt, Nigel Habgood, the series' car coordinator, refurbished the car and it was later re-used in the episode "Kill Switch."

Mark Snow, composer for the series, was particularly proud of the music he wrote for the episode, which he felt "complement[ed]" the "dark ... wonderful aura" of the episode. He credits the ominous feel of his final soundtrack to his use of synthesized woodwind instruments.

== Broadcast and reception ==
"Schizogeny" premiered on the Fox network on January 11, 1998. This episode earned a Nielsen rating of 12.9, with a 19 share, meaning that roughly 12.9 percent of all television-equipped households, and 19 percent of households watching television, were tuned in to the episode. It was viewed by 21.37 million viewers.

The episode received mixed to negative reviews from critics, with several reviewers dubbing it one of the worst episodes of the series. Francis Dass of the New Straits Times Press referred to it as "one of the weaker episodes" of the fifth season. The A.V. Club reviewer Emily St. James gave "Schizogeny" a D−, and wrote that it "just might be the very worst episode of The X-Files", noting that "the tone [of the episode] is off." Furthermore, St. James felt that "the more Scott and Wollaeger try to continue explaining this and tie it into the idea of child abuse, the less it attains any of the power or tragedy they want it to have." Starpulse, in a run-down of the best and worst episodes and villains of the series, named the killer trees the worst monster-of-the-week and wrote, "[Schizogeny] proved that even the X-Files' writers can come up completely dry on their scary creeps sometimes."

Robert Shearman and Lars Pearson, in their book Wanting to Believe: A Critical Guide to The X-Files, Millennium & The Lone Gunmen, rated the episode three-and-a-half stars out of five. The two wrote positively of the first part of the episode, noting that "director Ralph Hemecker [brings] the eeriness to the fore, and [makes] this a more honest-to-truth scary slice of X-File than has been offered in ages." Shearman and Pearson, however, argued that the episode's references to Psycho and its "lack of explanation" result in the episode approaching "nonsense." Paula Vitaris from Cinefantastique gave the episode a mixed review and awarded it two stars out of four. She wrote, "The plot of 'Schizogeny' is more tangled than the episode's paranormal root system, but underneath lies some powerful themes."

== Bibliography ==
- Gradnitzer, Louisa; Pittson, Todd (1999). X marks the spot: on location with the X-files. Arsenal Pulp Press. ISBN 1-55152-066-4.
- Meisler, Andy (1999), Resist or Serve: The Official Guide to The X-Files, Vol. 4, London: HarperCollins, ISBN 0-00-257133-1, OCLC 42005360
