= Christmas Carol (The X-Files) =

- The X-Files episode
- Melissa and Dana Scully open presents on Christmas in a flashback. Gillian Anderson's younger sister Zoë was chosen to play Scully in the sequence.
- Episode no.: Season 5 Episode 6
- Directed by: Peter Markle
- Written by: Vince Gilligan; John Shiban; Frank Spotnitz
- Production code: 5X05
- Original air date: December 7, 1997
- Running time: 45 minutes

Guest appearances
- Pat Skipper as Bill Scully Jr.; Sheila Larken as Margaret Scully; Karri Turner as Tara Scully; John Pyper-Ferguson as Detective Kresge; Rob Freeman as Marshall Sim; Lauren Diewold as Emily Sim; Melinda McGraw as Melissa Scully; Joey Shea as Dana Scully (1968); Ryan de Boer as Bill Scully Jr. (1968); Zoë Anderson as Dana Scully (1976); Rebecca Codling as Melissa Scully (1976); Gerard Plunkett as Dr. Ernest Calderon; Patricia Dahlquist as Susan Chambliss; Walter Marsh as Pathologist; Jo-Anne Fernandez as Forensic Technician; Dan Shea as Deputy; Gregor Sneddon as FBI Courier; Eric Breker as Dark Suited Man #1; Stephen Mendel as Dark Suited Man #2

Episode chronology
← Previous "The Post-Modern Prometheus"	Next → "Emily"
- The X-Files season 5

"Christmas Carol" is the sixth episode of the fifth season of American science fiction television series The X-Files. It was written by Vince Gilligan, John Shiban and Frank Spotnitz and directed by Peter Markle. The episode explores the series' overarching mythology. The episode premiered in the United States on December 7, 1997, on the Fox network, earning a Nielsen household rating of 12.8 and being watched by 20.91 million people in its initial broadcast. It received moderately positive reviews from television critics, with many complimenting Gillian Anderson's performance.

The show centers on FBI Special Agents Fox Mulder (David Duchovny) and Dana Scully (Gillian Anderson) who work on cases linked to the paranormal, called X-Files. Mulder is a believer in the paranormal, while the skeptical Scully has been assigned to debunk his work. In this episode, Scully, on Christmas vacation with her family, receives a mysterious phone call that leads her to a case involving a little girl that she believes to be the daughter of her dead sister, Melissa.

"Christmas Carol" is the first of a two-part story that concludes with episode seven, "Emily". The episode was inspired by the 1951 British film Scrooge, starring Alastair Sim. The young actress who originally played Emily was terrified of the hospital setting in the episode's sequel "Emily", and as a result the producers had to recast the role and reshoot all footage featuring her in this episode. Gillian Anderson's younger sister, Zoe, was chosen to play Scully in a flashback sequence.

== Plot ==
Around Christmas time, Dana Scully (Gillian Anderson) and her mother visit her brother Bill and his wife, Tara, who is expecting. Scully answers the phone, and the person on the other end, who sounds just like her dead sister, Melissa, tells her that someone needs her help. Scully traces the call to a nearby home in San Diego, where local police are investigating the suicide of a woman, Roberta Sim. Kresge, the lead detective on the case, tells Scully that it was impossible for Roberta to have dialed, as she died before the telephone call was made.

That night, after dinner, Scully reveals to her mother that, due to her abduction and cancer, she is unable to bear children. Scully flashes back to when, as a child, she hid her pet rabbit from her brother in a lunchbox, only for it to suffocate and die.

Scully receives another telephone call from the same person, which was once again made from the Sim home. Roberta's husband, Marshall, is meeting with two men in black inside his house, and has no desire to listen to and help Scully figure out what is going on.

Scully visits Kresge, to look further into Roberta Sim's death, despite the fact that the police think it is a simple suicide. She finds a striking resemblance between the Sims' daughter, Emily, and her sister, Melissa, from when Melissa was that age. Scully flashes back to a funeral she attended when she was a little girl, but imagines Marshall Sim holding her hand.

Scully insists on performing an autopsy on Roberta, thinking that Roberta was murdered. She finds a needle puncture in Roberta's foot, causing her to believe that Roberta was anesthetized and her suicide was staged. The police search the Sim's house and find a used hypodermic needle, which Marshall claims was for daily injections for Emily's anemia. Scully spots the men in black watching from a nearby car.

Scully receives DNA test results on Melissa, and, matching it up to Emily's DNA results, finds them nearly identical, causing Scully to believe that Melissa is Emily's mother. Scully believes that Melissa gave birth to Emily while on the West Coast, then gave her up for adoption, without ever telling the rest of the family. Scully flashes back to when she and Melissa were teenagers and were given cross necklaces from their mother for Christmas.

Kresge tells Scully that the Sims received several large payments from a pharmaceutical company, Prangen Industries. The two visit Dr. Calderon, who tells them that Emily was part of clinical trials, and that Roberta was paid the money to keep her from pulling Emily from the program. Marshall Sim is arrested for the murder of his wife. Scully gives Emily her cross necklace. Marshall soon confesses, but is found dead in his cell after being visited by the two dark-suited men.

Bill shows Scully a photo of Melissa, who is clearly not pregnant, shortly before Emily was born, which he thinks proves that Melissa isn't Emily's mother.

Scully meets with someone from an adoptive agency, because she wants to adopt Emily. The woman is very hesitant, considering Scully's job and the fact that Emily is a special needs child. Scully flashes back to talking with Melissa around Christmas time, shortly before she joined the FBI.

On Christmas morning, Scully receives the results of an RFLP test that she requested from the FBI. The test results prove that Scully, not Melissa, is Emily's mother.

== Production ==
=== Writing ===
During the second week of October 1997, David Duchovny was unable to film, as he was busy promoting his film Playing God (1997), so the producers decided to spend this week filming a Scully-centric episode. Given that this episode was slated to air in December of that year, writers Vince Gilligan, John Shiban, and Frank Spotnitz initially tried writing a Christmas episode similar to the 1951 film Scrooge, with Dana Scully in place of Alastair Sim's Scrooge. However, the three were unable to develop any more ideas, and so they decided to instead feature Scully being visited by "earlier versions of her family members herself", resulting in the flashback sequences that pepper the episode.

=== Filming ===
The young actress who had originally been cast to play Emily had severe nosocomephobia, which was triggered during the filming of "Emily". Because the actress could not be calmed down, the show's producers were forced to recast the role and reshoot all footage featuring Emily in "Christmas Carol". The show's casting crew eventually replaced her with Lauren Diewold, who had previously appeared on an episode of Millennium. Due to the season's hectic shooting schedule, Anderson's double was used in re-shot scenes. Casting director Corrine Mays had difficulty casting Scully's 1976 self before executive producer Robert Goodwin proposed using Gillian Anderson's fourteen-year-old sister Zoë for the role.

Props specialist Ken Hawryliw claimed the biggest challenge in producing the episode was finding Christmas paper from the 1980s for the flashback sequences. After production wrapped, Gillian Anderson was unsatisfied with her acting, stating: "I felt in the end that I was a little low energy, a little too melancholy. It was hard to find the right attitude for Scully in dealing with a child that's apparently hers; to find the right flavor of relationship to her and this disease she's going through, all mixed up with the aspect of the paranormal." Anderson also admitted that another issue she had was that Scully "had no history with" Emily so she was unable to "play the kind of attachment I would feel if my own daughter, Piper, were going through the same thing.

== Reception ==
"Christmas Carol" premiered on the Fox network on December 7, 1997. This episode earned a Nielsen rating of 12.8, with a 19 share, meaning that roughly 12.8 percent of all television-equipped households, and 19 percent of households watching television, were tuned in to the episode. It was viewed by 20.91 million viewers.

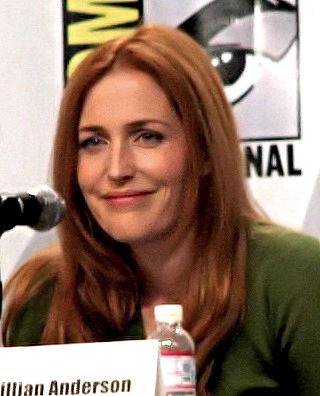
Several critics complimented Gillian Anderson's performance in the episode.

The episode received moderately positive reviews from television critics. Zack Handlen from The A.V. Club gave the episode an A and called it "generally a terrific episode". Handlen wrote that he was "delighted to get another Scully-centric episode [especially] one that doesn't end up with her looking pale and deathly in a hospital bed." Despite his approval of the script, he slightly criticized the series for writing Scully-centric episodes based solely on the idea that "something is being done to her" as opposed to against or with her.

Robert Shearman and Lars Pearson, in their book Wanting to Believe: A Critical Guide to The X-Files, Millennium & The Lone Gunmen, rated the episode four-and-a-half stars out of five. The two wrote that the script was "really sharp" and features "natural dialogue" that disguises the stumbles in the character study. Shearman and Pearson also praised Anderson's performance, calling it "terrific" and noted that her acting "hint[ed] years before it happens to the relationship Anderson will enjoy with Robert Patrick", the actor who would go on to portray agent John Doggett. Matt Hurwtiz and Chris Knowles, in their book The Complete X-Files called the episode "a showcase for Gillian Anderson's startling acting chops."

Paula Vitaris from Cinefantastique, on the other hand, gave the episode a negative review and awarded it one-and-a-half stars out of four. She described the episode as "one [where] disbelief isn't suspended so much as hung by the neck until dead". She heavily derided the episode's "overnight DNA tests", "helpful couriers that deliver the results at Christmas", and the fact that Scully fills out an adoption paper and is visited by a Social Service agent on Christmas Eve.

== Bibliography ==
- Hurwitz, Matt; Knowles, Chris (2008). The Complete X-Files: Behind the Series the Myths and the Movies. New York, US: Insight Editions. ISBN 978-1-933784-72-4.
- Meisler, Andy (1999), Resist or Serve: The Official Guide to The X-Files, Vol. 4, London: HarperCollins, ISBN 0-00-257133-1
- Shearman, Robert; Pearson, Lars (2009). Wanting to Believe: A Critical Guide to The X-Files, Millennium & The Lone Gunmen. Mad Norwegian Press. ISBN 978-0-9759446-9-1.
