= Little Green Men (The X-Files) =

- The X-Files episode
- An alien appears before Fox Mulder. "Little Green Men" was the first episode of The X-Files to actually show a live extraterrestrial.
- Episode no.: Season 2 Episode 1
- Directed by: David Nutter
- Written by: Glen Morgan; James Wong
- Production code: 2X01
- Original air date: September 16, 1994
- Running time: 45 minutes

Guest appearances
- Mitch Pileggi as Walter Skinner; Mike Gomez as Jorge Concepción; Vanessa Morley as Samantha Mulder; Raymond J. Barry as Richard Matheson; William B. Davis as The Smoking Man

Episode chronology
← Previous "The Erlenmeyer Flask"	Next → "The Host"
- The X-Files season 2

"Little Green Men" is the first episode of the second season of the science fiction television series The X-Files, premiering on the Fox network on September 16, 1994, in the United States and on BBC Two in the United Kingdom on August 28, 1995. The episode was written by Glen Morgan and James Wong, and directed by David Nutter. The episode helped explore the series' overarching mythology. "Little Green Men" earned a Nielsen household rating of 10.3, being watched by 9.8 million households in its initial broadcast. The episode received largely positive reviews from critics.

The show centers on FBI special agents Fox Mulder (David Duchovny) and Dana Scully (Gillian Anderson) who work on cases linked to the paranormal, called X-Files. Mulder is a believer in the paranormal, while the skeptical Scully has been assigned to debunk his work. In the episode, Mulder goes to the Arecibo Observatory in Puerto Rico to continue his search for proof on extraterrestrial life. Meanwhile, Scully attempts to aid him after being separated following the closure of the X-Files.

"Little Green Men" was written specifically as a way for Mulder to question his belief in aliens. The episode features the first appearance of an extraterrestrial, because series creator Chris Carter felt it was time to unveil one. In addition, the episode introduces the character of Senator Richard Matheson. Matheson was named after the sci-fi/horror writer Richard Matheson, who wrote many episodes of The Twilight Zone.

== Plot ==
In the episode's prologue, Fox Mulder narrates a history of NASA's Voyager program and the now-defunct High Resolution Microwave Survey, which sought to contact extraterrestrial life in outer space. At the Survey's abandoned observatory in Arecibo, Puerto Rico, the equipment inside suddenly activates, indicating a response from an alien intelligence.

Since the closure of the X-Files, the FBI has reassigned Mulder to a low-level wiretap while his former partner, Dana Scully, has returned to teaching at the FBI Academy. The two have a discreet meeting at the parking lot of the Watergate Hotel, where Mulder admits that he has been doubting his belief in the paranormal since Deep Throat's assassination. Mulder flashes back to the night when his sister, Samantha, was abducted.

Mulder is summoned to a meeting with Richard Matheson, a U.S. senator who is a patron for his work. Matheson directs Mulder to Arecibo, assuring the agent that he will try to hold off a Blue Beret UFO retrieval team said to be headed there in twenty-four hours. Arriving at the Survey station, Mulder discovers a frightened Puerto Rican man, Jorge, who cannot speak English but draws a picture of an alien he claims to have seen. Meanwhile, Scully, unaware of Mulder's whereabouts, goes to his apartment looking for him. Reviewing a list of flights from Washington, Scully recognizes one of Mulder's personal heroes' names and tracks him down to Puerto Rico.

Mulder discovers a signal, possibly originating from an extraterrestrial intelligence. During a storm, Jorge panics and runs outside; Mulder finds him dead of fright. When Scully goes to an airport to fly to Puerto Rico, she realizes she's being tracked by a couple but manages to lose them. Meanwhile, as Mulder examines Jorge's corpse, the room shakes. The door opens and the shadowy figure of an alien appears; Mulder tries to shoot it, but his gun malfunctions and he passes out. Scully wakes Mulder up the next morning, finding him excited about the readouts and tapes of the signals—the proof of aliens he has sought for so long. However, the Blue Beret team arrives, forcing them to flee with only a tape reel.

Upon his return to Washington, Mulder is admonished by Assistant Director Walter Skinner and the Smoking Man for his actions. Mulder claims he still has enough evidence with the days missed to prosecute the subject of his assigned wiretap, and that his own phone calls were being monitored. Skinner then demands that the Smoking Man leave the room, and decides to not discipline Mulder. Investigating the tape reel, Mulder finds it blank due to a power surge during the storm, but vows to continue his work regardless.

== Production ==
=== Writing and casting ===
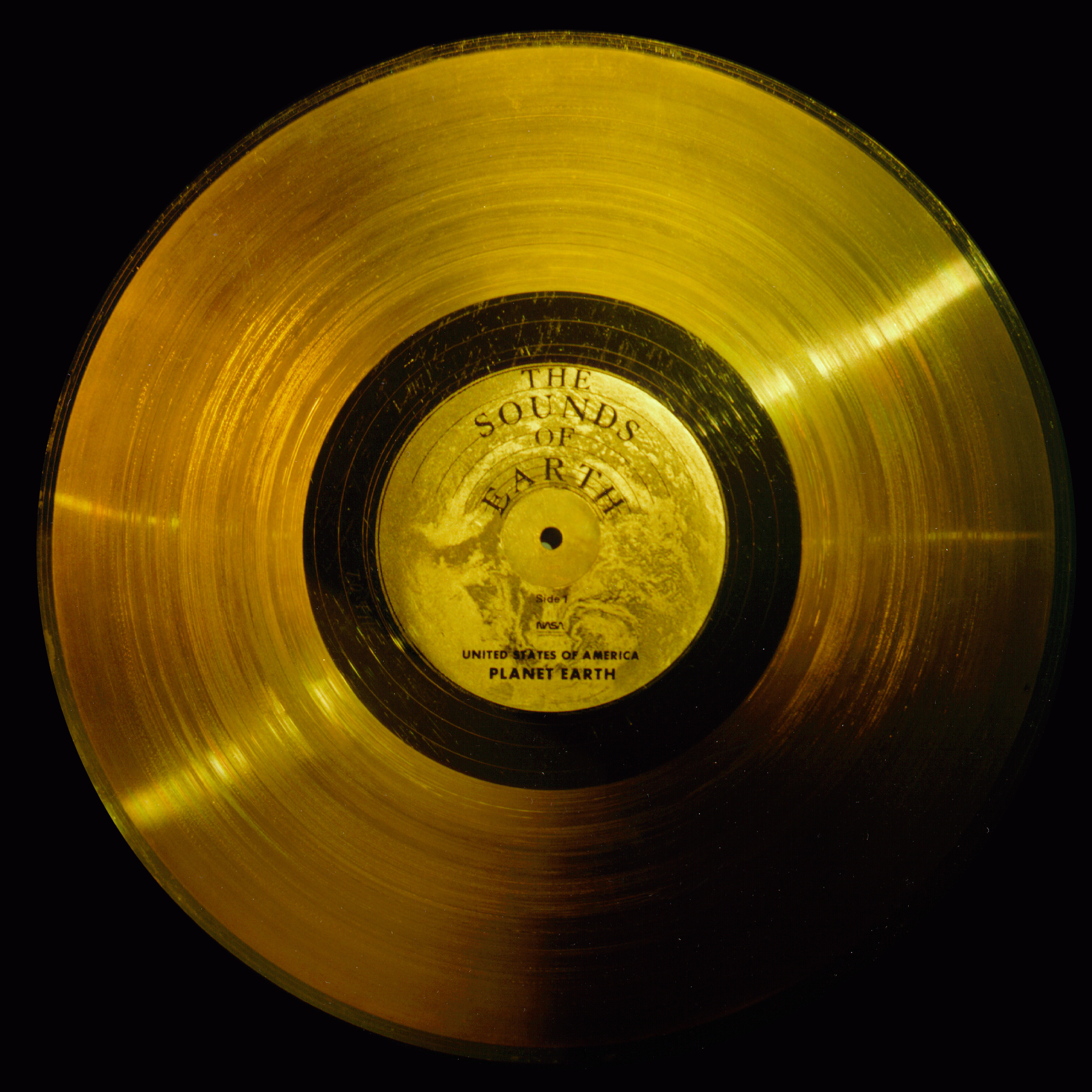
The episode contains numerous references to the Voyager program and, more specifically, the Voyager Golden Record.

This episode was written by Glen Morgan and James Wong, and directed by David Nutter. Originally, the season two premiere was supposed to be written by series creator Chris Carter. In the rough draft of this version, Mulder would have been sent to Moscow. Carter, however, assigned the episode to Morgan and Wong, and the story changed accordingly. Before working on the series, Morgan had written a script with the same name as this episode about a man who goes to a telescope located in Chile. The script was never turned into a finished product, but Morgan liked various elements of it, so he cannibalized parts for "Little Green Men". The episode was specifically written for Mulder to question himself and his beliefs, and according to Morgan and Wong, one of the main themes of the episode is "the idea that we all have to fight our own little green men and carry on."

Senator Matheson was named after the sci-fi/horror writer Richard Matheson, who wrote many episodes of The Twilight Zone. Matheson was originally to recite the episode's opening monologue. Darren McGavin, the former star of Kolchak: The Night Stalker, was the casting directors' first choice for the role, but they were unable to cast him. (McGavin was later sought out to play Mulder's father William, but he again eluded the staff. In the end, McGavin finally agreed to appear on the show during its fifth season; he was first introduced in the episode "Travelers" as Arthur Dales, the agent who founded the X-Files.) Matheson was then played by Raymond J. Barry.

=== Filming ===
During filming, the Plaza of Nations doubled for Miami Airport. At the airport, Scully pretends to read the fictional Miami Post Tribune but closer inspection reveals that she is actually reading the "Facts And Arguments" page from The Globe and Mail, a Canadian newspaper. The flight manifest that Scully scans in searching for Mulder is a list of X-Files fans. The Puerto Rican scenes were filmed at the Seymour Demonstration Forest in North Vancouver District. According to producer J. P. Finn, it was a struggle for the show to make the Greater Vancouver area resemble the tropical island of Puerto Rico, and that "if you look closely you'll see pine trees in the back[ground]." Gillian Anderson revealed on Late Night with Conan O'Brien that when she and Duchovny were filming the final scene escaping the Blue Berets, the actors portraying the soldiers had to pretend to shoot their guns and made their own sound effects, which caused the cast and crew to laugh "hysterically".

The episode marks the first visualization of Samantha's abduction by aliens. Although there are discrepancies between the depiction of her abduction in this episode and Mulder's description of it in both "Pilot" and "Conduit", Carter has attributed this to the unreliability of Mulder's hypnosis-induced memories. The episode also features the first appearance of extraterrestrials, as Carter thought it would be a good moment to reveal them. The image of the alien was stretched in post-production to make it look taller and skinnier. The writers for the episode researched various abductee reports and conspiracy theories in order to get the right feel for the episode and make the aliens appear realistic and not too "fanciful".

The episode makes several mentions to the Voyager program and the Voyager Golden Record; for instance, while in Senator Matheson's office, Mulder and Matheson listen to Brandenburg Concerto No. 2 in F. First Movement, which is the first piece of music on the Voyager record. In addition, the episode relies heavily on mentions of the Search for Extraterrestrial Intelligence (SETI) program, the collective name for a scientific surveys undertaken to search for intelligent extraterrestrial life. Morgan later explained, "I always wanted to do something with the SETI background. Hope that kids at school check out SETI, because it was factual as to what exists."

== Broadcast and reception ==
"Little Green Men" premiered on the Fox network on September 16, 1994. This episode earned a Nielsen rating of 10.3, with a 19 share, meaning that roughly 10.3 percent of all television-equipped households, and nineteen percent of households watching television, were tuned in to the episode. It was viewed by 9.8 million households. In addition, the episode won its time period among the "advertiser-friendly" 18-49 age ratings group.

The episode garnered a largely positive reception from critics. Entertainment Weekly wrote that the episode "Powerfully depicts both Mulder's gnawing sense of defeat and his bond with Scully, strangely growing stronger with separation" before concluding that the episode was "fairly standard." The site ultimately gave the episode a B. Reviewer Zack Handlen of The A.V. Club positively compared and contrasted the episode to the cartoon Scooby Doo, Where Are You? writing that, "I used to be a huge "Scooby Doo" fan. [...] Of course, none of [the villains] were really monsters. [...] The X-Files exploited a simple truth: we all want to believe. We might be afraid of what's lurking in the dark, but isn't there always a bit of wishing inside that fear? A hope that what we think we know isn't everything there is to know. That just once it might be nice to reach for a zipper and instead find nothing but cool scales." Handlen ultimately called the episode "Essential."

Bob Curtright, writing for the Los Angeles Daily News, called the episode "an engrossing chiller about potential contact from outer space." He compared the episode positively to Close Encounters of the Third Kind and noted that the episode was "both scary and wondrous" and "offer[ed] no pat answers that might tend to blow the credibility." Robert Shearman, in his book Wanting to Believe: A Critical Guide to The X-Files, Millennium & The Lone Gunmen, rated the episode five stars out of five, writing that the episode was not "what the fans were expecting, and its reputation isn't great. But I think this clever and claustrophobic little take, which does so much not only to refresh the show but to analyze what it's actually about, is one of the very best."

== See also ==
- List of unmade episodes of The X-Files

== Bibliography ==
- Edwards, Ted (1996). X-Files Confidential. Little, Brown and Company. ISBN 0-316-21808-1.
- Gradnitzer, Louisa; Todd Pittson (1999). X Marks the Spot: On Location with The X-Files. Arsenal Pulp. ISBN 1-55152-066-4.
- Hurwitz, Matt & Knowles, Chris (2008). The Complete X-Files: Behind the Series the Myths and the Movies. New York, US: Insight Editions. ISBN 978-1-933784-72-4.
- Lowry, Brian (1995). The Truth is Out There: The Official Guide to the X-Files. Harper Prism. ISBN 0-06-105330-9.
- Shearman, Robert (2009). Wanting to Believe: A Critical Guide to The X-Files, Millennium & The Lone Gunmen. Mad Norwegian Press. ISBN 978-0-9759446-9-1.
