= Emily (The X-Files) =

- The X-Files episode
- Episode no.: Season 5 Episode 7
- Directed by: Kim Manners
- Written by: Vince Gilligan; John Shiban; Frank Spotnitz
- Production code: 5X07
- Original air date: December 14, 1997
- Running time: 45 minutes

Guest appearances
- Pat Skipper as Bill Scully Jr.; Sheila Larken as Margaret Scully; Karri Turner as Tara Scully; Lauren Diewold as Emily Scully; Patricia Dahlquist as Susan Chambliss; Gerard Plunkett as Dr. Ernest Calderon; Tom Braidwood as Melvin Frohike; John Pyper-Ferguson as Detective Kresge; David Abbott as Judge Maibaum; Bob Morrisey as Dr. Vinet; Sheila Patterson as Anna Fugazzi; Eric Breker as Dark Suited Man #1; Stephen Mendel as Dark Suited Man #2; Mia Ingimundsen as Nurse; Tanya Huse as Medical Technician; Donny Lucas as Hyperbaric Oxygen Chamber Technician

Episode chronology
← Previous "Christmas Carol"	Next → "Kitsunegari"
- The X-Files season 5

"Emily" is the seventh episode of the fifth season of American science fiction television series The X-Files. It was written by Vince Gilligan, John Shiban and Frank Spotnitz and directed by Kim Manners. The episode explores the series' overarching mythology. The episode premiered in the United States on December 14, 1997, on the Fox network, earning a Nielsen household rating of 12.4 and being watched by 20.94 million people in its initial broadcast. It received mixed reviews from television critics.

The show centers on FBI Special Agents Fox Mulder (David Duchovny) and Dana Scully (Gillian Anderson) who work on cases linked to the paranormal, called X-Files. Mulder is a believer in the paranormal, while the skeptical Scully has been assigned to debunk his work. In this episode, Scully fights to protect her daughter’s life, while Mulder discovers her true origins. It is eventually discovered that Emily was created during Scully's abduction. Emily suffers from a tumorous infection and subsequently dies.

"Emily" is the second of a two-part story that began with episode six, "Christmas Carol". The young actress who originally played Emily was terrified of the hospital setting in "Emily", and as a result the producers had to recast the role and reshoot all footage featuring her. Filming for the episode was also disrupted when angry demonstrators protested at one of the show's filming sites.

== Plot ==
In a dream-like sequence, Dana Scully (Gillian Anderson) walks through a desert and picks up a gold cross necklace on the ground.

Continuing from the previous episode, agent Fox Mulder (David Duchovny) arrives at San Diego County Children's Center, where Scully introduces him to Emily. Mulder tells Scully that Emily's surrogate mother is named Anna Fugazzi, but that fugazzi is slang for fake, and there are no true records of how Emily came into the world.

Mulder is interviewed by a judge, regarding Scully adopting Emily. Mulder explains that Emily was conceived from Scully's ova, which were taken from her during her abduction; the judge is skeptical. Later, Scully and Mulder find that Emily has a fever, and they discover a green cyst on the back of her neck. In a hospital, a nurse pierces the cyst with a needle, and green liquid oozes from the wound. The nurse collapses from exposure to the liquid, but Emily appears unaffected. Mulder believes that Emily has the same body chemistry that they have seen before with alien-human hybrids.

At Prangen Pharmaceuticals, Mulder tries to get Dr. Calderon, Emily's doctor, to grant access to Emily's medical records; Calderon refuses. Mulder beats him up and threatens him with a gun. Calderon hurriedly leaves the building; Mulder follows, surreptitiously. Scully has imaging tests conducted on Emily.

Calderon goes to a large house to see the two Dark Suited Men, one of whom kills him by stabbing him in the back of the neck with an alien stiletto. Calderon's wound bleeds the same green liquid. Both men then morph into Calderon look-alikes. Mulder follows one of the look-alikes as he leaves the house. The results of Emily's tests show her to be suffering from a rapidly-growing neoplastic mass in her central nervous system. The second Calderon look-alike injects Emily with an unknown dark green substance, then escapes by changing his appearance again. Scully believes that Calderon is continuing the treatments, and that the Sims were murdered because they were trying to stop him. Mulder returns to the large house, which turns out to be a nursing home. There, he stumbles upon the real Anna Fugazzi, an innocent elderly lady.

The hospital doctor tells Scully that Emily is getting worse. A woman from the adoption agency wants to stop Scully from making decisions for Emily. Mulder connects the names of the women in the nursing home to recent births and finds that Dr. Calderon was treating them. Emily reacts badly to being placed in a hyperbaric oxygen chamber. Mulder finds medical records with Scully's name on them at the nursing home, along with a live fetus in a refrigerated chamber. Mulder finds Calderon entering soon after, and Detective Kresge arrives as well. Mulder and Kresge confront Calderon, who attacks Kresge. Despite Mulder's warning, Kresge shoots Calderon, whose wounds cause him to spew green blood which incapacitates Kresge. Mulder quickly leaves the building to avoid being affected by the blood. Calderon morphs into Kresge, deceives Mulder, and escapes.

Mulder returns to the hospital, where Emily has gone into a coma. Days later Emily dies. Mulder visits Scully at the funeral chapel, telling her that Kresge is recovering and all evidence at the nursing home and Prangen is gone. The only evidence left is Emily's body, but the agents instead find sand bags in her coffin along with Scully's cross necklace, which she had previously given to Emily.

== Production ==
The young actress who had originally been cast to play Emily had severe nosocomephobia, which necessitated the show's producers recasting the role and reshooting all footage featuring Emily in the previous episode "Christmas Carol". Director Kim Manners recalls, "I called Bob Goodwin and said, 'We're dead in the water here, pal. This little actress is not cooperating at all'. We recast that role and started up again the next day." The show's casting crew eventually replaced her with Lauren Diewold, who had previously appeared on an episode of Millennium.

The building used for the nursing home in this episode was occupied by squatters "a few days before shooting" in protest, as the building was slated to be converted into a condominium high-rise. While these squatters eventually left, anti-redevelopment protesters soon arrived and began picketing. The producers of The X-Files did not want to let the activists know they were filming, so they kept a "low profile" by removing any information from their clothing that would indicate that they worked on The X-Files. Although the crew hoped that the activists would disperse on their own, a few were still protesting when production on this episode began, resulting in the police getting involved.

== Reception ==
"Emily" premiered on the Fox network on December 14, 1997. This episode earned a Nielsen rating of 12.4, with a 19 share, meaning that roughly 12.4 percent of all television-equipped households, and 19 percent of households watching television, were tuned in to the episode. It was viewed by 20.94 million viewers.

The episode received mixed reviews from television critics; many were more critical of the episode than "Christmas Carol". Emily St. James from The A.V. Club gave the episode a B and wrote that she did not "totally buy “Emily” […] even though I like large portions of" the episode. St. James wrote positively of "most of the Scully scenes", noting that Anderson "found some of the raw sense of hope and loss" that the shots required. However, she was critical of the episode's plot, arguing that it only "goes through the motions" and "is about everybody getting really worked up over a little girl we’ve just met." She concluded that "two-parter is strongest when it grabs hold of this notion. But it’s at its weakest when it turns into just another episode of The X-Files."

Other reviews were decidedly more mixed to negative. Robert Shearman and Lars Pearson, in their book Wanting to Believe: A Critical Guide to The X-Files, Millennium & The Lone Gunmen, rated the episode three stars out of five. The two wrote that "Mulder catches up with the store and immediately this all becomes a little more formulaic." The two praised the episode's teaser, referring to it as "deathless prose", but were more critical of the plot, arguing that the episode "feels too soon to see yet more sequences of people standing around emoting as they watch the dying in the hospital", a reference to the show's earlier arc involving Scully's cancer. Shearman and Pearson, however, did compliment the performance of both Diewold and Anderson, and called the finale scene "wonderful". Paula Vitaris from Cinefantastique, on the other hand, gave the episode a negative review and awarded it one star out of four. She heavily criticized the episode's characterization, noting that the episode's opening sequence was "ludicrous" and its revelations were "out of the blue". Vitaris reasoned that, because Scully had spent time with her mother, remembered fondly her sister, and reconnected her faith in God in "Redux II", "this development just doesn't track." Vitaris also criticized Mulder's antics, calling him a "thug" for beating up "an unarmed man and kicking him while he's down."

== Bibliography ==
- Hurwitz, Matt; Knowles, Chris (2008). The Complete X-Files: Behind the Series the Myths and the Movies. New York, US: Insight Editions. ISBN 978-1933784724.
- Meisler, Andy (1999), Resist or Serve: The Official Guide to The X-Files, Vol. 4, London: HarperCollins, ISBN 0-00-257133-1
- Shearman, Robert; Pearson, Lars (2009). Wanting to Believe: A Critical Guide to The X-Files, Millennium & The Lone Gunmen. Mad Norwegian Press. ISBN 978-0975944691.
