= Bob Dawson (actor) =

Canadian radio broadcaster

- Born: 1955
- Died: November 7, 2001 (aged 45–46); Vancouver, BC
- Occupation: Radio broadcaster
- Years active: 1970s—1990s

Bob Dawson (c. 1955 – November 7, 2001) was a Canadian radio broadcaster and actor based in Vancouver, British Columbia. Dawson was a fixture on the local radio circuit during the late 1970s and 80s, holding various on-air and promotional positions at radio stations such CJOR (a holding at the time of Canadian businessman Jimmy Pattison's The Jim Pattison Group), CJJC and CKXY. Dawson was also the voice of Santa Claus on "The Rafe Mair Show" on CKNW radio, where he took the calls of children just prior to each Christmas.

Dawson moved into TV and movie work in the 1990s, during the period when Vancouver became known as Hollywood North. Dawson appeared in many locally produced television series, including The X-Files, Highlander and Stargate. Perhaps his most prominent film appearance was opposite former Seattle Seahawks linebacker turned actor Brian Bosworth in the 2000 feature film The Operative.

Bob Dawson died on November 7, 2001, in Vancouver, British Columbia, at the age of 46. The cause of death hasn't been disclosed to the public.
