= Travelers (The X-Files) =

- The X-Files episode
- An alien-spider emerges from Edward Skur's mouth and attacks Hayes Michel. The scene was created with a special facial appliance that allowed the creature to crawl out of Skur's mouth.
- Episode no.: Season 5 Episode 15
- Directed by: William A. Graham
- Written by: John Shiban; Frank Spotnitz
- Production code: 5X15
- Original air date: March 29, 1998
- Running time: 45 minutes

Guest appearances
- Fredric Lehne as young Arthur Dales; Garret Dillahunt as Edward Skur; Brian Leckner as Hayes Michel; David Moreland as Roy Cohn; Eileen Pedde as Mrs Skur; Dean Aylesworth as young Bill Mulder; David Fredericks as FBI Director; Mitchell Kosterman as Sheriff; Roger Haskett as Coroner; Jane Perry as Dorothy Bahnsen; J. Douglas Stewart as Landlord; Cory Dagg as Bartender; Eric W. Gilder as old Edward Skur; Darren McGavin as Arthur Dales

Episode chronology
| ← Previous "The Red and the Black" | Next → "Mind's Eye" |
- The X-Files season 5

"Travelers" is the fifteenth episode of the fifth season of American science fiction television series The X-Files, and the 111th episode of the series overall. It was written by John Shiban and Frank Spotnitz, directed by William A. Graham and aired in the United States on March 29, 1998, on the Fox network. The episode earned a Nielsen household rating of 9.9, being watched by 15.06 million people in its initial broadcast. The episode received mixed reviews from television critics.

The show centers on FBI special agents Fox Mulder (David Duchovny) and Dana Scully (Gillian Anderson) who work on cases linked to the paranormal, called X-Files. Mulder is a believer in the paranormal, while the skeptical Scully has been assigned to debunk his work. In this flashback episode, a young Fox Mulder visits retired FBI Agent Arthur Dales (Darren McGavin), who tells him about one of the first X-Files, a case that Mulder's father, Bill, was involved in.

"Travelers" was written as a tribute to Howard Dimsdale, a screenwriter who was victimized by Hollywood blacklist in the 1950s and explored the idea that "the witch-hunt [of the 1950s] was actually a smoke screen to conceal something else". Noted actor Darren McGavin appears as Arthur Dales. McGavin was requested for the part especially by Chris Carter and had been approached to play various characters on the series before. In order to create a "convincing period movie", various special effects were used, including a special facial appliance that allowed the "alien spider" to crawl out of Skur's mouth and into his victim, and a bleaching job for the final film to give it an aged feel.

== Plot ==
In 1990 in Caledonia, Wisconsin, a man named Edward Skur is shot by a police officer during an eviction and the last word he speaks is "Mulder". Fox Mulder (David Duchovny), at this point working with the FBI's Behavioral Science Unit, believes that the man may have had some connection to his father, Bill. Mulder discovers that Skur was reported to have died in 1952. He seeks out Arthur Dales (Darren McGavin), a retired FBI agent who investigated Skur in the 1950s. At first, Dales is reluctant to discuss the case and warns Mulder away. However, Mulder's threat of a subpoena persuades Dales to tell his story.

In a flashback to the 1950s, Dales (Fredric Lehne) and his partner Hayes Michel are sent to arrest Skur (Garret Dillahunt) for being a communist. When Dales is told that Skur hanged himself while in custody, he feels guilty and returns to Skur's house to apologize to his wife. While there, he sees Skur alive and tries to recapture him. In the following struggle, an appendage emerges from Skur's mouth. Skur is forced to flee when a neighbor interrupts the fight. Both Michel and Roy Cohn warn Dales to change his report about the attack. He does so, but feels guilty about it.

Later, Dales and Michel are called to investigate the death of a German doctor in Chevy Chase, Maryland. The local police deny calling them, and Dales finds a coaster for a bar with the words "come alone" written on the back. At the bar, Dales meets Bill Mulder, an agent from the State Department. Bill tells him that Skur was experimented on along with two other men, who later killed themselves; that Skur killed the German doctor in revenge for what was done to him and that he will kill Dales and Michel too because Skur believes they are part of the plot. Dales tries to warn Michel by telephone but is unable to prevent his murder. Dales tries to investigate his partner's death but Cohn covers it up.

A secretary at the FBI office, Dorothy Bahnsen (Jane Perry), helps Dales find a file that mentions Gissing, one of the two test subjects. Gissing's body is still in the morgue and Dales convinces the technician to cut open his body, where they find a strange creature has been sewn into Gissing's chest. Dales goes to Skur's wife and tells her what was done to her husband and that he wants to expose the experiments. Skur's wife goes down into the backyard bomb shelter to tell Skur, but he is overcome by his parasite and kills her.

Cohn brings Dales before FBI Director J. Edgar Hoover, who convinces him to help bring in Skur. They take Dales back to the bar to meet Skur, who attacks Dales. Bill and the other agent wait outside until they think Dales is dead before rushing in to find that he has handcuffed Skur and is still alive.

In 1990, Fox Mulder is dismayed to hear what his father was involved in. He asks Dales how Skur escaped and Dales speculates that someone might have helped him, hoping that the truth of what was done to him may one day be revealed. The episode ends with a final flashback of Bill Mulder driving down a road with Skur and giving Skur the keys to the car and walking away.

== Production ==
=== Writing and casting ===
The episode was inspired by the story of Howard Dimsdale, a screenwriter who had been negatively affected by the Hollywood blacklist in the 1950s. Dimsdale wrote several movies under the pseudonym "Arthur Dales"—a name which eventually made its way into this episode. For many years, Dimsdale was an instructor at the American Film Institute in Los Angeles, where he taught executive producer Frank Spotnitz and co-producer John Shiban. While developing this episode, the two decided to combine many of Dimsdale's stories of "paranoia, treachery, and double-dealing" with the idea that "the witch-hunt was actually a smoke screen to conceal something else". The writers soon realized that by setting the episode in the past, they would also be able to "trace the roots of both Fox Mulder and the X-Files".

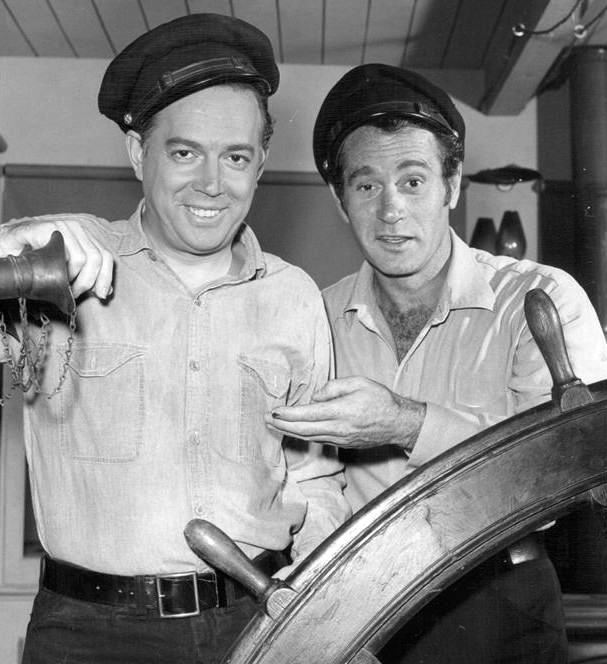
Darren McGavin (right; promo photo from Riverboat) makes his first appearance as Arthur Dales in the episode.

Scully did not appear in this episode, as Gillian Anderson was busy filming final parts of Fight the Future. Noted actor Darren McGavin appears as Arthur Dales. He was requested for the part especially by Chris Carter. Casting director Rick Millikan noted, "McGavin was Chris's inspiration for writing this series. He always had Darren in mind to use somewhere, and that was really his doing. He said 'I want Darren McGavin for this,' and he happened to be available, and we got him." McGavin had originally been casting directors' first choice for the role of Senator Matheson for the second season opener "Little Green Men". McGavin was later sought out to be Mulder's dad, but he again eluded the staff. In the end, McGavin finally agreed to appear on the show playing Dales.

=== Filming ===
Because the show's fifth season was filmed under a number of financial and time restraints, production for "Travelers" was somewhat rushed. Costume designer Jenni Gullet was forced to "frantically" rent or create the vintage clothing featured in the episode, and art director Gary Allen did extensive research to make J. Edgar Hoover's office look realistic. Allen also constructed the bomb shelter, because his father was a contractor who had actually built several. Special effects supervisor Toby Lindala created the "alien spider" as well as a special facial appliance that Garret Dillahunt wore. The final film was slightly bleached in post-production to give it a "vintage appearance". The production staff was pleased with the final product, noting that it "does justice" to both "the painful controversies of the 1950s" and The X-Files as a "contemporary TV series".

The episode contains several in-jokes. The song playing in the German doctor's house is the popular song "Lili Marleen", of which a new recording was made specifically for this episode. The record sleeve attributes the track to "Paula Rabwini", a reference to one of the series' producers, Paul Rabwin. Agent Hayes Michel was named after the fiancé of series creator Chris Carter's executive assistant, Mary Astadourian.

=== Continuity ===
In several shots, Mulder wears a wedding band. This was David Duchovny's idea; he explained "That was just me, you know, fooling around. I had recently gotten married, and I wanted to wear it." While series creator Chris Carter felt that Duchovny's action created a continuity problem, Duchovny reassured Carter by pointing out that there were not very many episodes, if any, that had been planned to take place seven years prior to the events in this episode. The inclusion of the detail caused an "Internet frenzy" and the minor detail was never resolved on screen.

== Reception ==
=== Ratings ===
"Travelers" premiered in the US on the Fox network on March 19, 1998, and in the United Kingdom on February 3, 1999. This episode earned a Nielsen rating of 9.9, with a 15 share, meaning that roughly 9.9 percent of all television-equipped households, and 15 percent of households watching television, were tuned in to the episode. It was viewed by 15.06 million viewers.

=== Reviews ===
"Travelers" received mixed reviews from critics. In a 2000 review of season five for the New Straits Times, Francis Dass noted that the episode possessed a "nice retro feel throughout". Dass was also complimentary towards the fact that "Mulder senior is shown in action" during the episode. Emily VanDerWerff from The A.V. Club gave the episode a B and wrote positively of it, noting that, although the entry was designed as a "stall", it felt like a "weird backdoor pilot for [a show] that never happened." She noted that the episode "isn’t as good as it could have been" but argued that the story was "still a mostly fun episode". In addition, VanDerWerff wrote positively of McGavin's guest starring role and was complimentary towards the "alien spider thing", describing it as "wonderfully gross".

Robert Shearman, in his book Wanting to Believe: A Critical Guide to The X-Files, Millennium & The Lone Gunmen, rated the episode four stars out of five and called it "fresh and urgent". He wrote that, while the episode was a stopgap, it "cannot be better placed." Shearman further argued that "Travelers"'s use of the "Communist witch hunt" conceit and its idea that "serving" means being a patriot, whereas "resisting" means being a traitor —a reference to the previous episode's tagline—themes were well-played. Shearman further praised McGavin's acting, noting that he was "the series' spiritual father". In his "Politics of the X-Files" column at The Companion, A.J. Black observed that "‘Travelers" skirts the edges of what would be considered a ‘mytharc’ storyline, tethered to the alien mythology, by attempting to transform the fear of Communism directly into a fear of the extra-terrestrial, without ever using the word."

Other reviews were more critical. Paula Vitaris from Cinefantastique gave the episode a largely negative review and awarded it one star out of four. She noted that the episode, much like the earlier season five entry "Unusual Suspects" was "filler", but that, unlike the earlier episode, "Travelers" was "not particularly entertaining." Vitaris criticized the character of Arthur Dales and wrote that he was "not an intriguing character". However, she did praise the visuals, describing them as "outstanding".

== Bibliography ==
- Hurwitz, Matt & Knowles, Chris (2008). The Complete X-Files: Behind the Series the Myths and the Movies. New York, US: Insight Editions. ISBN 978-1933784724.
- Lowry, Brian (1995). The Truth is Out There: The Official Guide to the X-Files. Harper Prism. ISBN 0061053309.
- Meisler, Andy (1999), Resist or Serve: The Official Guide to The X-Files, Vol. 4, London: HarperCollins, ISBN 0-00-257133-1
- Shearman, Robert (2009). Wanting to Believe: A Critical Guide to The X-Files, Millennium & The Lone Gunmen. Mad Norwegian Press. ISBN 978-0975944691.
