= The X-Files season 5 =

Season of television series

The X-Files
- Season 5
- DVD cover
- Starring: David Duchovny; Gillian Anderson
- No. of episodes: 20

Release
- Original network: Fox
- Original release: November 2, 1997 – May 17, 1998

Season chronology
- ← Previous; Season 4 Next → Season 6

The fifth season of the science fiction television series The X-Files commenced airing on the Fox network in the United States on November 2, 1997, concluding on the same channel on May 17, 1998, and contained 20 episodes. The season was the last in Vancouver, British Columbia, Canada; subsequent episodes would be shot in Los Angeles, California. In addition, this was the first season of the show where the course of the story was planned, due to the 1998 The X-Files feature film being filmed before it, but scheduled to be released after it aired.

The fifth season of the series focused heavily on FBI federal agents Fox Mulder's (David Duchovny) loss of faith in the existence of extraterrestrials and his partner, Dana Scully's (Gillian Anderson), resurgence of health following her bout with cancer. New characters were also introduced, including agents Jeffrey Spender (Chris Owens) and Diana Fowley (Mimi Rogers) and the psychic Gibson Praise (Jeff Gulka). The finale, "The End", led up to both the 1998 film and the sixth season premiere "The Beginning".

Debuting with high viewing figures and ranking as the eleventh most watched television series during the 1997–98 television year in the United States, the season was a success, with figures averaging around 20 million viewers an episode. This made it the year's highest-rated Fox program as well as the highest rated season of The X-Files to air. Critical reception from television critics was generally positive.

== Plot overview ==
The show centers on FBI special agents Fox Mulder (David Duchovny) and Dana Scully (Gillian Anderson) who work on cases linked to the paranormal, called X-Files. At the end of the fourth season, Scully is dying of cancer. Mulder is convinced that her condition is a result of her earlier abduction, and is prepared to make a deal with the Syndicate to find a cure. While being pursued by an assassin responsible for a hoax alien corpse discovered on a mountaintop, Mulder fakes his own suicide, mutilating the assassin's face to provide a decoy body. In the fifth season opener "Redux", he uses the distraction to infiltrate The Pentagon to find a cure for Scully's cancer, while Scully is able to uncover and reveal a Syndicate connection within the FBI. Due to the information he learns from Michael Kritschgau (John Finn), Mulder loses his belief in extraterrestrials.

Later, as a rebel alien race secretly attacks several groups of former alien abductees, the agents meet Cassandra Spender (Veronica Cartwright), a woman who claims to be a multiple abductee and wants to deliver a positive message about aliens. Eventually, Mulder has Scully put under hypnosis to learn the truth about her abduction after Cassandra goes missing and her son, Jeffrey Spender (Chris Owens), angrily attempts to push his way up in the FBI. The Syndicate, meanwhile, quicken their tests for the black oil vaccine, sacrificing their own to do so. Later, the assassination of a chess grandmaster leads Mulder and Scully into an investigation that they soon discover strikes at the heart of the X-Files; they learn that the real target was a telepathic boy named Gibson Praise (Jeff Gulka).

== Production ==
=== Writing ===
Due to the pending release of The X-Files feature film, this was the first season where the course of the season was planned in advance, as it had to set up for the film. Originally, the season was supposed to be the show's last. In this manner, the finale was originally supposed to have segued the television series into a movie franchise. David Duchovny explained, "we were saying, 'Okay, we're going to do five. We'll get out of here at five.' And then five came around, and no one was going anywhere." The series proved to be so lucrative for Fox that two additional seasons were ordered. Thus, the season was created in a way to segue into the 1998 film, as well as the sixth season premiere, "The Beginning".

=== Filming ===
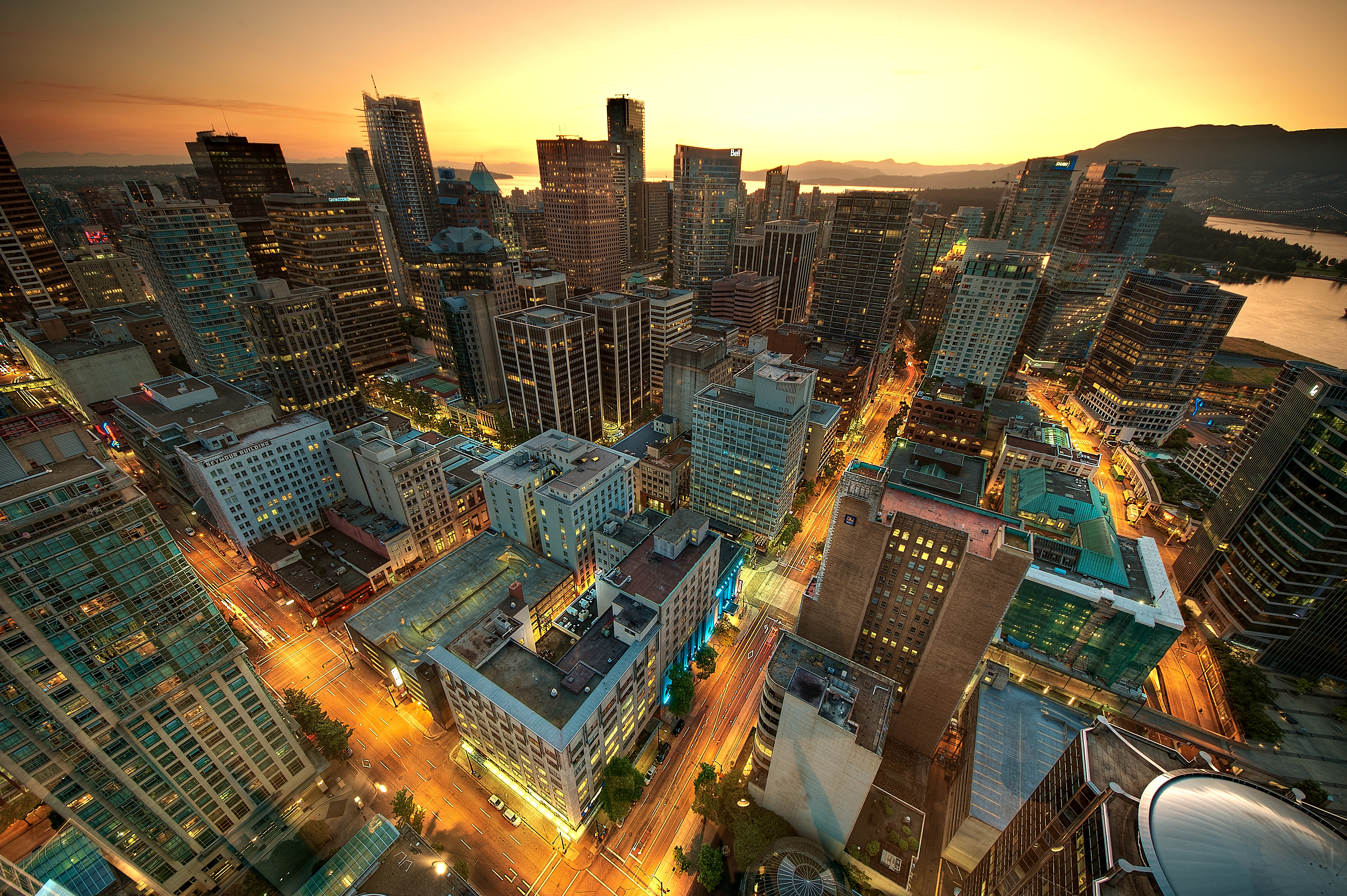
Season 5 was the last of the original 9-season run to be filmed in Vancouver

Due to the necessity of filming reshoots for the upcoming movie, both Gillian Anderson and David Duchovny are absent in places throughout the season of 20 episodes. For instance, the episodes "Unusual Suspects" and "Travelers"—both of which being flashback episodes—do not feature Anderson's character Dana Scully at all. In fact, the former was written entirely as a stop-gap episode when the show's producers were forced to start production of the fifth season in the last week of August in Vancouver, but still needed series stars Duchovny and Anderson for the filming of The X-Files movie in Los Angeles. The producers decided to create an episode dedicated to The Lone Gunmen, and writing duties were assigned to Vince Gilligan. Other episodes such as "Chinga" and "Christmas Carol" feature minimal appearances by Duchovny's character Fox Mulder.

The season's fifth episode, "The Post-Modern Prometheus", written and directed by Carter, was filmed entirely in black-and-white—in homage to James Whale's 1931 film version of Frankenstein. The director of photography, Joel Ransom, had to spend longer than usual lighting each scene because of the grayscale. The stormy skies in the episode, added to emulate the atmosphere of old Frankenstein movies, were a visual effect. Carter also used a wide-angle camera lens throughout the episode, which forced the actors to act directly to the camera, rather than to each other. According to Carter, it also enabled him to give scenes in the episode a more surreal staging than was usual for the show.

This season finale, "The End", was the last episode of the series to be filmed in Vancouver, British Columbia, Canada prior to production moving to Los Angeles, although the second film in the franchise, The X-Files: I Want to Believe, released in 2008, was once more filmed in Vancouver. The move was influenced in part by Duchovny, who after five years of filming wanted to be closer to his wife. The audience at the chess match was made up of local fans as a "thank you" to the city for hosting the production during its first five years. The chess match was filmed at Rogers Arena—then known as GM Place—the home of the Vancouver Canucks as well as the Vancouver Grizzlies at the time. While the producers expected five thousand people to show up, twelve thousand appeared. Instructions were given to the crowd by director R. W. Goodwin using giant video screens attached to the scoreboard. During breaks between shooting concession stands, music and videos were made available to the attendees. Actors Duchovny and Anderson also answered questions for the audience and over $20,000 worth of equipment was raffled off. Series creator Chris Carter directed the second unit filming for the episode in order to be with the show's Canadian crew members.

=== Crew ===
Carter served as executive producer and showrunner and wrote seven episodes. Frank Spotnitz and John Shiban were both promoted to co-executive producer and wrote seven and five episodes, respectively. Vince Gilligan was promoted to supervising producer and contributed six scripts. Tim Minear joined the series for his only season on the series as an executive story editor and wrote two episodes. Writing team Billy Brown and Dan Angel joined the series as story editors for this season only and provided the story for one episode. Writing team Jessica Scott and Mike Wollaeger wrote one freelance episode. Special guest writers for this season included author Stephen King, who co-wrote one episode with creator Chris Carter, and cyberpunk novelists William Gibson and Tom Maddox, who wrote their first of two episodes for the series. Other producers included producer Joseph Patrick Finn, producer Paul Rabwin, and co-producer Lori Jo Nemhauser who previously served as post-production supervisor.

Producing-director Kim Manners directed the most episodes of the season, directing seven. Producer Rob Bowman, executive producer R. W. Goodwin, and series creator Chris Carter, each directed two episodes. The rest of the episodes were directed by Brett Dowler, Peter Markle, Daniel Sackheim, Ralph Hemecker, Cliff Bole, William A. Graham and Allen Coulter, who each directed one episode.

== Cast ==
=== Main cast ===
==== Starring ====
- David Duchovny as Special Agent Fox Mulder
- Gillian Anderson as Special Agent Dana Scully (Note: Anderson does not appear in "Unusual Suspects" and "Travelers".)

==== Also starring ====
- Mitch Pileggi as Deputy Director Walter Skinner
- William B. Davis as Cigarette Smoking Man
- Nicholas Lea as Alex Krycek

=== Recurring cast ===
- Tom Braidwood as Melvin Frohike
- Bruce Harwood as John Fitzgerald Byers
- Dean Haglund as Richard Langly
- Chris Owens as Jeffrey Spender
- John Neville as Well-Manicured Man
- Don S. Williams as First Elder
- John Moore as Third Elder
- Sheila Larken as Margaret Scully
- Pat Skipper as Bill Scully

=== Guest cast ===
- Laurie Holden as Marita Covarrubias
- Veronica Cartwright as Cassandra Spender
- John Finn as Michael Kritschgau
- George Murdock as Second Elder
- Charles Cioffi as Scott Blevins
- Steven Williams as X
- Mimi Rogers as Diana Fowley
- Brian Thompson as Alien Bounty Hunter
- Dean Aylesworth as Young Bill Mulder
- Jeff Gulka as Gibson Praise

== Episodes ==
Episodes marked with a double dagger (‡) are episodes in the series' Alien Mythology arc. (Note: The episodes were included in the DVD collections The X-Files Mythology, Volume 2 – Black Oil and The X-Files Mythology, Volume 3 – Colonization, released by Fox.)

No. overall	No. in season	Title	Directed by	Written by	Original release date	Prod. code	U.S. viewers (millions)
98	1	"Redux"‡	R. W. Goodwin	Chris Carter	November 2, 1997	5X02	27.34
Scully helps Mulder fake his death, but comes under intense scrutiny; Skinner is suspected as the traitor inside the FBI; and Mulder breaks into the Department of Defense in a desperate bid to save Scully, but while doing so he finds himself facing the truth about the aliens he has been chasing.
99	2	"Redux II"‡	Kim Manners	Chris Carter	November 9, 1997	5X03	24.84
While Scully lies on her deathbed; Cigarette Smoking Man makes an important decision in helping Mulder. But even as events come to a climax, Mulder finds his belief in his crusade has all but collapsed.
100	3	"Unusual Suspects"	Kim Manners	Vince Gilligan	November 16, 1997	5X01	21.72
The origins of the Lone Gunmen are explored. In 1989, two salesmen and a federal employee join forces when they meet Susanne Modeski, a woman who claims that she is being pursued by her violent ex-boyfriend, an FBI agent named Fox Mulder. We learn how agent Mulder came to meet three friendly and familiar faces.
101	4	"Detour"	Brett Dowler	Frank Spotnitz	November 23, 1997	5X04	22.88
On the way to an FBI convention in Florida, Mulder and Scully stop to help in the investigation of the mysterious disappearance of three people in the woods, where a pair of invisible humanoids lurk.
102	5	"The Post-Modern Prometheus"	Chris Carter	Chris Carter	November 30, 1997	5X06	18.68
Filmed in black-and-white, Mulder and Scully investigate a letter from a single mother that leads them to a small town where a modern-day version of Frankenstein's monster lurks, Jerry Springer is an obsession, and Cher plays a significant part.
103	6	"Christmas Carol"‡	Peter Markle	Vince Gilligan & John Shiban & Frank Spotnitz	December 7, 1997	5X05	20.91
Home for the holidays, Scully is haunted by dreams which hint at a strange connection to a dead woman's daughter.
104	7	"Emily"‡	Kim Manners	Vince Gilligan & John Shiban & Frank Spotnitz	December 14, 1997	5X07	20.94
Scully fights to protect her daughter's life, while Mulder discovers her true origins.
105	8	"Kitsunegari"	Daniel Sackheim	Vince Gilligan & Tim Minear	January 4, 1998	5X08	19.75
When 'Pusher' Modell escapes from prison, Mulder and Scully race to catch him before he can take revenge against his favorite target – Agent Mulder.
106	9	"Schizogeny"	Ralph Hemecker	Jessica Scott & Mike Wollaeger	January 11, 1998	5X09	21.37
When a teenager is suspected of murdering his stepfather, Mulder and Scully become convinced that a greater evil may be lurking in the community.
107	10	"Chinga"	Kim Manners	Stephen King & Chris Carter	February 8, 1998	5X10	21.33
Scully takes a vacation to Maine, where she encounters a bizarre case where the victims appear to have inflicted wounds upon themselves – apparently at the behest of a strange young girl.
108	11	"Kill Switch"	Rob Bowman	William Gibson & Tom Maddox	February 15, 1998	5X11	18.04
While investigating the strange circumstances of the death of a reclusive computer genius rumored to have been researching artificial intelligence, Mulder and Scully become targets of an unlikely killer capable of the worst kind of torture.
109	12	"Bad Blood"	Cliff Bole	Vince Gilligan	February 22, 1998	5X12	19.25
While investigating bizarre exsanguinations in Texas, Mulder kills a teenage boy whom he "mistakes" for a vampire. Awaiting a meeting with Skinner, Mulder and Scully attempt to get their stories "straight" by relating to each other their differing versions of what happened during their investigation.
110	13	"Patient X"‡	Kim Manners	Chris Carter & Frank Spotnitz	March 1, 1998	5X13	20.21
Scully forms a bond with Cassandra Spender, a woman who claims to have been abducted by aliens. While Mulder's disbelief in the alien conspiracy is now questioned, he finds himself with more personal threats at the FBI.
111	14	"The Red and the Black"‡	Chris Carter	Chris Carter & Frank Spotnitz	March 8, 1998	5X14	19.98
With Cassandra Spender missing, and her son Jeffrey angrily attempting to push his way up in the FBI, Mulder has Scully put under hypnosis to learn the truth. The Syndicate, meanwhile, quicken their tests for the alien vaccine, sacrificing their own to do so.
112	15	"Travelers"	William A. Graham	John Shiban & Frank Spotnitz	March 29, 1998	5X15	15.06
In 1990, a bizarre murder leads young agent Fox Mulder to question a former FBI Agent who investigated one of the first X-Files dating back to the 1950s – a case which may have involved Mulder's father.
113	16	"Mind's Eye"	Kim Manners	Tim Minear	April 19, 1998	5X16	16.53
Agents Mulder and Scully investigate a murder that seems to have been committed by a blind woman, but Mulder suspects that her involvement is not what it seems.
114	17	"All Souls"	Allen Coulter	Story by : Billy Brown & Dan Angel; Teleplay by : Frank Spotnitz & John Shiban	April 26, 1998	5X17	13.44
The unexplained death of a young handicapped girl prompts Father McCue to ask Scully for her help, but her investigation leads her to a mystery she's afraid to understand.
115	18	"The Pine Bluff Variant"	Rob Bowman	John Shiban	May 3, 1998	5X18	18.24
Scully begins to grow suspicious of Mulder, whose increasingly strange behavior suggests he may be serving another agenda.
116	19	"Folie à Deux"	Kim Manners	Vince Gilligan	May 10, 1998	5X19	17.63
Mulder and Scully encounter a delusional man who believes his boss may be a monster – and is willing to pay any price to prove it.
117	20	"The End"‡	R. W. Goodwin	Chris Carter	May 17, 1998	5X20	18.76
Investigating the murder of a chess player, Mulder and Scully meet a boy who may be the embodiment of everything in the X-Files. This episode marks the first appearance of Diana Fowley.

== Reception ==
=== Ratings ===
The fifth season of The X-Files debuted with "Redux I" on November 2, 1997. This episode earned a Nielsen rating of 16.1, with a 22 share, meaning that roughly 16.1 percent of all television-equipped households, and 22 percent of households watching television, were tuned in to the episode. The episode was viewed by 27.34 million people, a marked increase from the fourth season's finale, "Gethsemane", which was viewed by 19.85 million viewers. "Redux I" also marked a drastic increase from the fourth season debut, "Herrenvolk", which garnered 21.11 million viewers. As the season continued, however, ratings began to drop slightly, stabilizing around approximately 20 million viewers-per-episode. The season hit a low with the seventeenth episode, "All Souls", which was viewed by 13.44 million viewers. The season finale, "The End", earned a Nielsen rating of 11.9, with an 18 share, and was viewed by 18.76 viewers, marking a 31.4 percent drop in viewers when compared to the season premiere, (Note: "The End" was viewed by 18.76 million viewers whereas "Redux I" was viewed by 27.34 million viewers. Subtracting the two figures and then dividing them by 27.34 million, which represents the largest possible audience, yields a percent decrease of 31.4 percent.) and a 5.5 percent drop in viewers when compared to the previous season finale. (Note: "The End" was viewed by 18.76 million viewers whereas "Gethsemane" was viewed by 19.85 million viewers. Subtracting the two figures and then dividing them by 19.85 million, which represents the largest possible audience, yields a percent decrease of 5.5 percent.) The season ranked as the eleventh most watched television series during the 1997–98 year, with an average of 19.8 million viewers. This made it the highest-rated season of The X-Files to air as well as the highest rated Fox program for the 1997–98 season.

=== Reviews ===
Michael Sauter of Entertainment Weekly gave the season an "A−", writing that it "proves the show was—even then—still at its creative peak (if only for another year or so) and full of surprises". He praised the new additions to the series' mythology and concluded that "many stand-alone episodes now look like classics". Francis Dass, writing for the New Straits Times, noted that the season was "very interesting" and possessed "some [...] truly inspiring and hilarious" episodes." Not all seasonal reviews were glowing. Paula Vitaris from Cinefantastique called the season "a mixed bag of episodes".

The episodes themselves received varied responses from critics. Several were culled out as highlights of the series. "The Post-Modern Prometheus" was heralded as a classic by several reviewers and was called the finest stand-alone episode produced by the series by another. The episode "Bad Blood" was praised by critics for its mix of horror and comedy. Dass called the episode "an absolute gem" and "the most hilarious X-Files episode I have ever seen." The episode has also appeared on various "Best-Of" lists of The X-Files. Other episodes fared worse. "Schizogeny" was derided by critics: The A.V. Club reviewer Emily VanDerWerff noted that the episode "might be the very worst episode of The X-Files" "Chinga", written by Stephen King, was criticized for having a poor story. Vitaris called the entry "a major disappointment" and wrote that it "isn't scary in the least".

=== Accolades ===
The fifth season earned the series a record of sixteen Primetime Emmy Award nominations, the most a single season of The X-Files received. It won two of the awards it was nominated for–Outstanding Art Direction for a Series for "The Post-Modern Prometheus" and Outstanding Single Camera Picture Editing for a Series for "Kill Switch". The series received its fourth consecutive nomination for Outstanding Drama Series. David Duchovny received his second consecutive nomination for Outstanding Lead Actor in a Drama Series, while Gillian Anderson received her third nomination for Outstanding Lead Actress in a Drama Series, which she won the previous year. Lili Taylor and Veronica Cartwright both received nominations for Outstanding Guest Actress in a Drama Series. The episode "The Post-Modern Prometheus" received multiple nominations, with the exception of its single win, it was also nominated for Outstanding Directing for a Drama Series (Chris Carter), Outstanding Writing for a Drama Series (Chris Carter), Outstanding Cinematography for a Series (Joel Ransom), Outstanding Music Composition for a Series (Mark Snow), Outstanding Single Camera Picture Editing for a Series (Lynne Willingham), and Outstanding Makeup for a Series. Other nominations were for Outstanding Single Camera Picture Editing for a Series for "Mind's Eye", and Outstanding Sound Editing for a Series and Outstanding Sound Mixing for a Drama Series for "The Red and the Black". The series also won its third and final Golden Globe Award for Best Television Series – Drama, while Gillian Anderson and David Duchovny received nominations in the television series drama acting categories.

== DVD release ==
The X-Files – The Complete Fifth Season
Set details		Special features
20 episodes; 6-disc set; 1.78:1 aspect ratio; Subtitles: English, Spanish; English (Dolby Digital 2.0 Surround)		"The Truth About Season Five" Documentary; Audio Commentaries (Dolby Digital 2.0 Stereo); "The Post-Modern Prometheus" – Chris Carter; "The Pine Bluff Variant" – John Shiban; 8 special effects clips; 6 deleted scenes; 11 "Behind the Truth" F/X spots
Release dates
Region 1	Region 2	Region 3
May 14, 2002	December 27, 2004	November 11, 2002

== Bibliography ==
- Hurwitz, Matt; Knowles, Chris (2008). The Complete X-Files. Insight Editions. ISBN 978-1-933784-80-9.
- Kessenich, Tom (2002). Examination: An Unauthorized Look at Seasons 6–9 of the X-Files. Trafford Publishing. ISBN 978-1-55369-812-8.
- Meisler, Andy (1998). I Want to Believe: The Official Guide to the X-Files. Vol. 3. Harper Prism.
- Meisler, Andy (1999). Resist or Serve: The Official Guide to The X-Files. Vol. 4. London: HarperCollins. ISBN 978-0-00-257133-3.
