= Kitsunegari =

- The X-Files episode
- The body of Nathan Bowman, covered in blue paint. The scene was created by drenching an in-house dummy with the correct shade of paint. One critic referred to the sequence as "striking".
- Episode no.: Season 5 Episode 8
- Directed by: Daniel Sackheim
- Written by: Vince Gilligan; Tim Minear
- Production code: 5X08
- Original air date: January 4, 1998
- Running time: 45 minutes

Guest appearances
- Mitch Pileggi as Walter Skinner; Michael Dobson as US Marshall; Kurt Evans as Todd; Michelle Hart as Trace Agent; Jill Krop as Reporter; Richard Leacock as Second Officer; Stuart O'Connell as First Officer; Ty Olsson as Young Orderly; Scott Oughterson as Old Orderly; Diana Scarwid as Linda Bowman; Collen Winton as Therapist; Robert Wisden as Robert Patrick Modell; Donna Yamamoto as Female Agent

Episode chronology
← Previous "Emily"	Next → "Schizogeny"
- The X-Files season 5

"Kitsunegari" is the eighth episode of the fifth season of American science fiction television series The X-Files. It was written by Vince Gilligan and Tim Minear, and directed by Daniel Sackheim. It aired in the United States on January 4, 1998 on the Fox network. "Kitsunegari" earned a Nielsen household rating of 11.6, being watched by 19.75 million people in its initial broadcast. The episode received mixed reviews from television critics.

The X-Files centers on FBI Special Agents Fox Mulder (David Duchovny) and Dana Scully (Gillian Anderson) who work on cases linked to the paranormal, called X-Files. Mulder is a believer in the paranormal, while the skeptical Scully has been assigned to debunk his work. In this episode, Mulder and Scully search for the infamous killer Robert "Pusher" Modell (Robert Wisden)—a human with the ability to force his will onto others—after he escapes from prison. The agents soon discover that he is not their only concern: Modell has a sister, and she is just as capable of mind-control as he is.

"Kitsunegari", the title of which means "fox hunt" in Japanese, serves as a sequel to the third-season episode "Pusher". Minear's original story for the episode was one where a convicted criminal who happened to be an atheist would have heard the voice of God, commanding him to kill a truly evil man. Frequent series writer Frank Spotnitz suggested that Minear should use fan favorite Robert Modell.

== Plot ==
In Lorton, Virginia, Robert Patrick "Pusher" Modell—a self-proclaimed "ronin" who possesses psychokinetic abilities—uses his powers of mental persuasion to escape from a prison hospital. Later, Walter Skinner (Mitch Pileggi), Dana Scully (Gillian Anderson), and Fox Mulder (David Duchovny) arrive and learn that Modell suddenly awoke from the coma caused when Mulder shot him six months earlier. Mulder takes the lead on the investigation, against the protestation of Scully, who worries that her partner, by getting involved, is deliberately playing Modell's game again. While Mulder and Scully are visiting the prison, Modell calls and tries to talk to Mulder, but Mulder refuses to listen.

The agents are then called to the scene of a murder, where a dead man has been found covered in cerulean blue paint. The victim is Nathan Bowman, the prosecutor at Modell's trial. "Kitsunegari" (the Japanese term for "fox hunt") is written on the walls in blue paint. After discovering a photograph of a woman at the scene of the crime, the agents are introduced to Nathan's wife, Linda, a realtor. Mulder, confused that the killing does not fit Modell’s previous modus operandi, searches a nearby building and encounters Modell, who eventually breaks down Mulder's resistance and gets him to listen.

Mulder later tells Scully and Skinner that he no longer believes Modell is on another killing spree; instead, due to an odd interview he had had with Linda, he suspects that she is the killer and that she possesses Modell's powers. Worried that the case is going to the agent's head, Skinner suspends Mulder, but Mulder vows to prove his theory. He first tries meeting with Modell's physical therapist to gain answers. But as he tries to show her a picture of Linda, the therapist gets a phone call. After answering the call and saying she is with Mulder, the therapist sticks her hand into a fuse box and is fatally electrocuted. Mulder reports the incident to Scully and urges her to keep Linda away from a phone.

Meanwhile, Skinner takes Linda to an FBI safe house, but Modell soon arrives in a police car and enters Linda's room, locking the door. Skinner kicks down the locked door and finds Modell and Linda inside. Modell calmly says he has a gun, and Skinner shoots him when he sees one in Modell's hand. Once Modell falls, however, Skinner realizes his hand was merely curled into the shape of a gun. Later, as Modell is being taken away on a stretcher, Mulder arrives and concludes that Modell deliberately forced Skinner to shoot him to protect Linda. When Scully says Linda has been taken home, Mulder goes to Modell's hospital room. A nurse asks him to leave while she changes Modell’s bandages, but she is actually Linda wearing a piece of paper with "Nurse" written on it. Linda talks Modell's heart into stopping and escapes. Mulder returns to find Modell dead and notices that the paper has "214 Channel Avenue" written on the back.

That night, Mulder visits the address and finds what appears to be Scully pointing a gun at him, claiming Linda is controlling her. She then kills herself. Linda appears behind Mulder, but she reveals personal information about him, proving that she is actually Scully despite what Mulder sees. She fires at a figure behind him, breaking the illusion: Mulder now sees Scully in front of him and a wounded Linda behind him. Later, in Skinner's office, a brain scan reveals that Linda has an advanced temporal lobe tumor, just like her fraternal twin, Robert Modell. The two had been separated at birth. Troubled by how close he came to killing Scully, Mulder feels that he ultimately lost Linda's game.

== Production ==
The episode was written by Tim Minear and Vince Gilligan, and directed by Daniel Sackheim. Minear's original idea for the episode involved a convicted criminal who happened to be an atheist. While in prison, he would have heard the "voice of God" commanding him to kill a truly evil man. The prisoner would have then escaped, with only Mulder believing that he was working for the greater good. Minear noted that "I pitched it and I was going to do it, eventually, until we found ourselves at a point in the year where we needed a script really fast." Executive producer Frank Spotnitz suggested that the "convicted atheist" be replaced with Robert Modell from the third season episode "Pusher". Minear thus put aside the "Word of God" story (as it was called), and worked with Gilligan to write the final script.

Robert Wisden, who had played Modell in the original episode, was re-hired for this episode, and Diana Scarwid was chosen to play Modell's sister. The scenes taking place at the Lorton Penitentiary cafeteria were actually filmed at a former hospital storage facility. In order to dress the set, the structure had to be cleared of aged detritus and garbage; this required the destruction of several large sump pumps, which were "jackhammered into smithereens". The body of Nathan Bowman, Linda's husband, was created by drenching an in-house dummy with the correct shade of paint. The episode's title, "Kitsunegari" (狐狩り) is a Japanese term meaning "fox hunting". The series hired two Japanese translators to produce the proper Japanese translation of the phrase and its associated Kanji glyph, due to the fact that "fox hunting" is not a pre-existing term in the Japanese language.

== Reception ==
"Kitsunegari" premiered on the Fox network in the United States on January 4, 1998. This episode earned a Nielsen rating of 11.6, with a 17 share, meaning that roughly 11.6 percent of all television-equipped households, and 17 percent of households watching television, were tuned in to the episode. It was viewed by 19.75 million viewers.

The episode received mixed reviews from television critics. Robert Shearman and Lars Pearson, in their book Wanting to Believe: A Critical Guide to The X-Files, Millennium & The Lone Gunmen, rated the episode three-and-a-half stars out of five. The two wrote that, while "it lacks Vince Gilligan's trademark wit", the episode takes the plot threads started in "Pusher" to their "logical conclusions". Shearman and Pearson explained that the episode's acting, most notably that of Robert Wisden and Diana Scarwid, "helps raise 'Kitsunegari' above the average." Zack Handlen from The A.V. Club gave the episode a mixed review and awarded it a C+. He wrote that, despite his love for "Pusher", "'Kitsunegari' isn't anywhere near as good as its predecessor". Handlen cited the change in Modell's personality, his lack of a desire to kill, and Scully's portrayal as a "humorless scold who only sees the truth when required to for narrative convenience" as reasons why the episode was weak. He concluded that "Kitsunegari" was "not very well put together".

Paula Vitaris from Cinefantastique gave the episode a mixed review and awarded it two stars out of four. She called the entry "tame" compared to its original, although she understood the show's desire to write a sequel. Vitaris also criticized the fact that Modell never murdered anyone and called the episode's basic plot "cheesy". She did, however, compliment several of the episode's set pieces, such as "Nathan Bowman covered in cerulean blue paint"—which she called "striking"—and the scene wherein "Linda stops the heart of the suffering Modell", calling the latter "sensately performed."

Critic A.J. Black compared the fate of Modell to that of writer Vince Gilligan's later characters, Walter White and Saul Goodman from Breaking Bad and Better Call Saul. Black argues that, in this episode, Gilligan and Minear's writing evokes the same zero-sum sense of sadness that would eventually run throughout Breaking Bad and Better Call Saul.

== See also ==
- List of unmade episodes of The X-Files

== Bibliography ==
- Hurwitz, Matt; Knowles, Chris (2008). The Complete X-Files: Behind the Series the Myths and the Movies. New York, US: Insight Editions. ISBN 978-1933784724.
- Meisler, Andy (1999), Resist or Serve: The Official Guide to The X-Files, Vol. 4, London: HarperCollins, ISBN 0-00-257133-1
- Shearman, Robert; Pearson, Lars (2009). Wanting to Believe: A Critical Guide to The X-Files, Millennium & The Lone Gunmen. Mad Norwegian Press. ISBN 978-0975944691.
