= Pusher (The X-Files) =

- The X-Files episode
- Episode no.: Season 3 Episode 17
- Directed by: Rob Bowman
- Written by: Vince Gilligan
- Production code: 3X17
- Original air date: February 23, 1996
- Running time: 44 minutes

Guest appearances
- Mitch Pileggi as Walter Skinner; Robert Wisden as Robert Patrick Modell; Vic Polizos as Agent Frank Burst; Roger Cross as SWAT team member; Steve Bacic as Agent Collins; Don Mackay as Judge; Brent J.D. Sheppard as Prosecutor; D. Neil Mark as Deputy Scott Kerber; Julia Arkos as Holly; Meridith Bain-Woodward as Defense Attorney; Ernie Foort as Lobby Guard; Darren Lucas as Lead SWAT Cop; Dave Grohl as Background Character (uncredited); Jennifer Youngblood as Background Character (uncredited)

Episode chronology
← Previous "Apocrypha"	Next → "Teso Dos Bichos"
- The X-Files season 3

"Pusher" is the seventeenth episode of the third season of the American science fiction television series The X-Files. It originally aired on the Fox network on February 23, 1996, and was written by Vince Gilligan and directed by Rob Bowman. The episode is a "Monster-of-the-Week" story, unconnected to the series' wider mythology, or overarching fictional history of The X-Files. "Pusher" earned a Nielsen household rating of 10.8, being watched by 16.2 million viewers in its initial broadcast. "Pusher" received overwhelmingly positive reviews from television critics.

The show centers on FBI special agents Fox Mulder (David Duchovny) and Dana Scully (Gillian Anderson) who work on cases linked to the paranormal, called X-Files. In this episode, Mulder and Scully's assistance is requested for a case involving a man, who goes by the pseudonym "Pusher", seemingly capable of bending people to his will. The suspect uses his mysterious abilities to manipulate Mulder into a dangerous end game.

"Pusher" was crafted by Gilligan with the intention to feature a tense cat and mouse game between Mulder and Pusher. The final scene, featuring a game of Russian roulette, was met with some resistance from the network. The standards and practices department argued that, because the game had never been featured on a television series before, it was unsuitable for broadcast. Several actors were considered for the role of Modell, including Lance Henriksen, who went on to play the lead role in Millennium, but Robert Wisden was eventually selected for the role.

== Plot ==
Robert Patrick Modell (Robert Wisden) walks through a supermarket, buying a large supply of protein supplement beverages. Before he can leave, Modell is surrounded and arrested by FBI agents led by Frank Burst (Vic Polizos). While being escorted away in a police car, he repeatedly talks about the color cerulean blue, repeatedly stating "Cerulean blue is a gentle breeze." Modell's talking seemingly causes the driver to not see an approaching semi-trailer truck of that color, causing a collision. Modell escapes after the driver unlocks his handcuffs before dying.

Burst, the only surviving agent of the crash, tells Fox Mulder (David Duchovny) and Dana Scully (Gillian Anderson) about his pursuit of Modell—nicknamed "Pusher"—who has committed a series of contract killings over the past two years, making the acts appear to be suicide. Mulder spots the word "ronin" written at the crime scene, and tracks down Modell's classified advertisement in a mercenary magazine. Mulder believes that Modell has the psychic ability to "push" people to do his will. Using the phone number in the ad, the agents track down Modell to a golf course in Falls Church, Virginia, where he makes a SWAT agent pour gasoline on himself and then set himself on fire. Mulder finds Modell exhausted in a car nearby, arresting him.

During his arraignment, Modell uses his ability to make the judge let him go. The agents look into Modell's past and find that he failed to enter the FBI after a psychological examination deemed him to be grossly egocentric and sociopathic. Meanwhile, after writing the word "pass" on a piece of paper and putting it in his lapel, Modell is able to pass security and enter FBI headquarters. He "pushes" a government worker, Holly (Julia Arkos), into pulling up Mulder's file for him. When Walter Skinner (Mitch Pileggi) intervenes, Modell convinces Holly that he was a man who mugged her, causing her to spray Skinner with mace and beat him. Scully is unable to explain how Modell has his power, but now agrees with Mulder's theory that he can push people into doing whatever he wants.

Agents raid Modell's apartment, but find it empty. They find cans of protein drinks in the refrigerator and medicine for epilepsy. Mulder suspects that a brain tumor has given Modell his psychokinetic ability, but that using his power is physically exhausting, forcing him to constantly consume the protein supplements. Mulder believes that he is dying and wants to go out in a blaze of glory. Modell makes a taunting phone call to Agent Burst and causes him to have a fatal heart attack while they try to trace him. The agents track Modell down to a hospital, where he has compelled a guard to shoot an MRI technician and kill himself. Mulder ventures inside the hospital and is captured by Modell.

Scully finds the two sitting at a table with the dead guard's revolver. Modell forces Mulder to play Russian roulette with him. Despite Scully's pleading, Mulder pulls the trigger first at Modell and then himself, the hammer falling on an empty chamber both times. Modell then makes him aim the gun at Scully. At the last instant, Scully sees a fire alarm in a mirror and pulls it, breaking Modell's concentration. Mulder instantly switches his aim to Modell and pulls the trigger. The bullet is fired and Modell is severely wounded.

Later, Mulder and Scully visit Modell in the hospital, where he is lying in a coma from which Scully predicts he will not awaken before his brain tumor kills him. Mulder surprises her by revealing that Modell's brain tumor was operable at all times, but he refused to have it removed, even as his health deteriorated. Scully asks why, and Mulder repeats her earlier assessment of Modell — that he was always a "little man", and his psychic ability made him feel big.

== Production ==
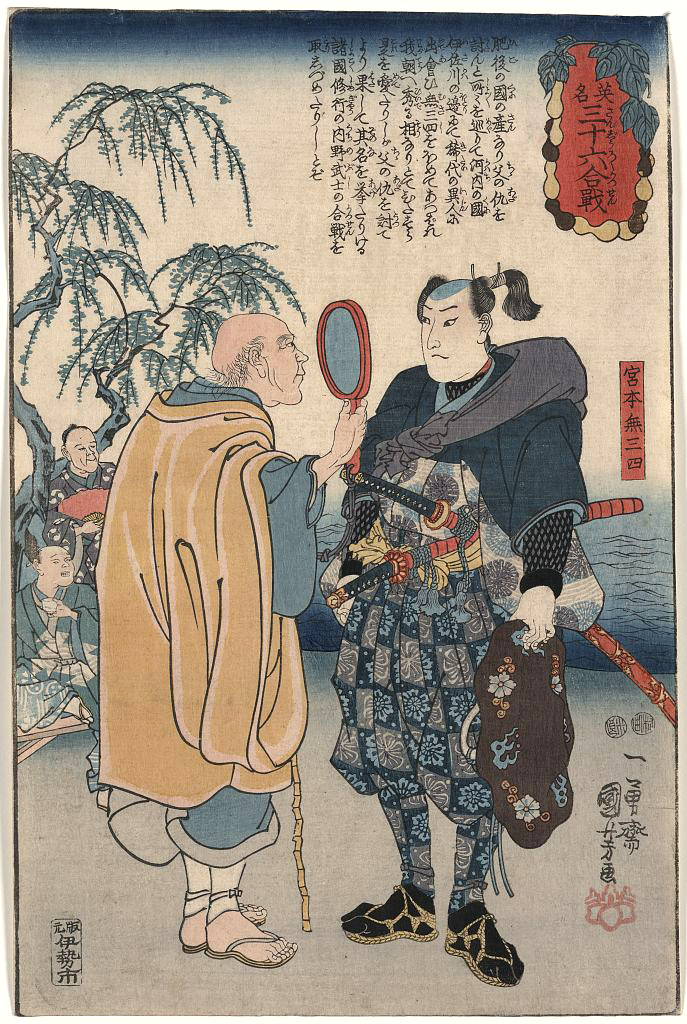
In the episode, Modell advertises himself as a rōnin—a samurai with no lord or master (famous rōnin Miyamoto Musashi pictured).

=== Writing ===
"Pusher" was written by Vince Gilligan and directed by Rob Bowman. Gilligan wanted the episode to be a "tense cat and mouse game between Mulder and Modell", and he later explained, "the only conscious thing I wanted to do from the start was get them together as much as I could". When Gilligan turned in his script, he told series creator Chris Carter that the episode was "the best work I'm ever gonna do for you." Carter retorted that the show's writers should try to out-do their last effort. Modell would later return in the fifth-season episode "Kitsunegari".

The final scene, featuring a game of Russian roulette, was met with resistance from Fox's standards and practices department, which argued that because the game had never been seen in a television series before it was unsuitable for broadcast. The department also claimed that the scene could be harmful to impressionable young children. After a series of tense negotiations, the producers refused to concede and the scene was included in the episode largely uncut; Gilligan later noted that he could not "believe we got away with it".

The episode contains several inside jokes: The Flukeman from the second-season episode "The Host" appears on a tabloid in the opening scene. The tabloid that featured the Flukeman also had a small image of props master Ken Hawryliw and the American Ronin magazine that Mulder flips through contained a "blink-and-you'll miss-it" shot of production assistant Danielle Faith. When Mulder is being fitted for a camera, the script originally had him ask if the device received the Discovery Channel. Duchovny, knowing that his character had an interest in pornography, changed the line to "the Playboy Channel".

=== Casting ===
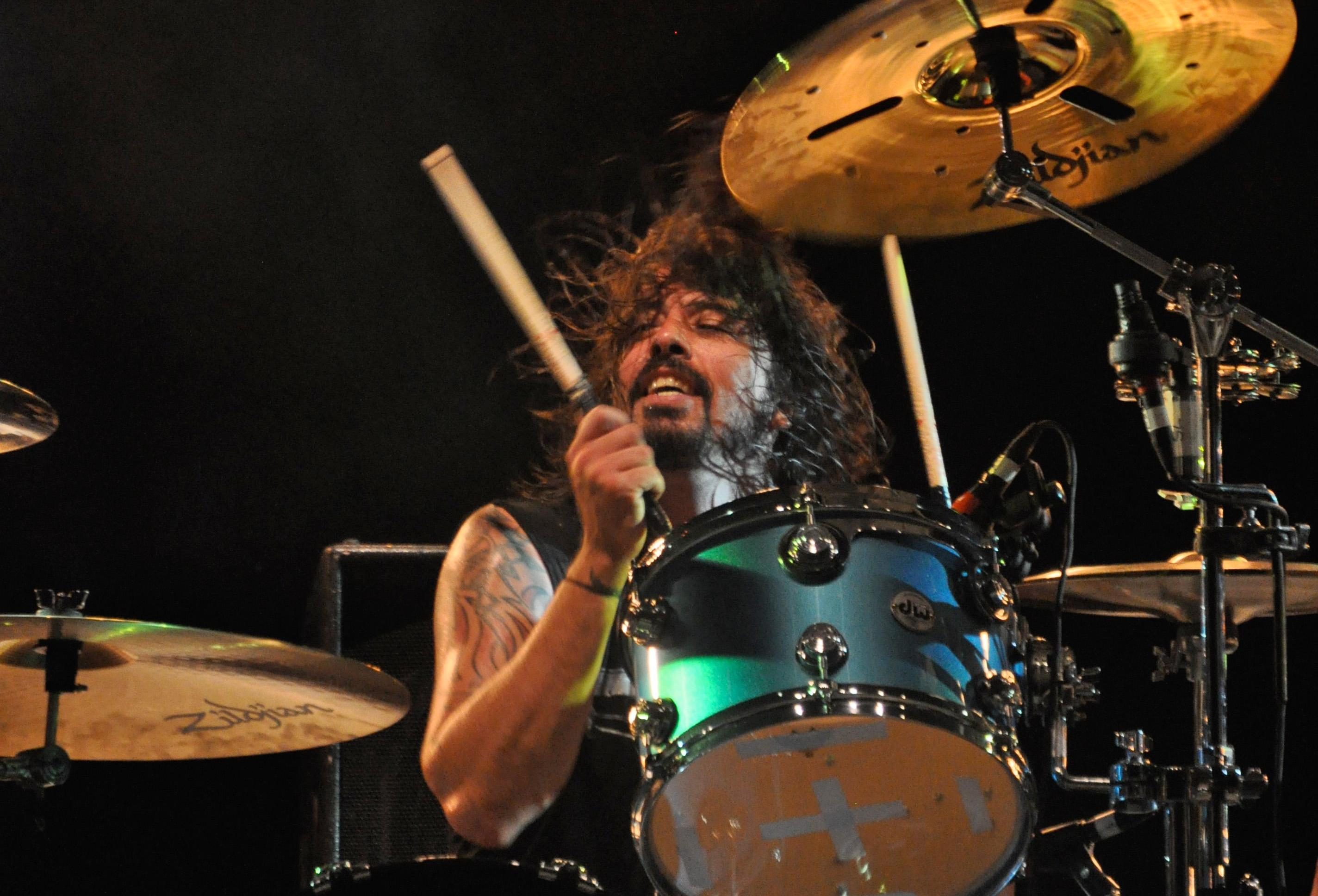
Musician Dave Grohl made a cameo appearance in the episode.

Several actors were considered for the role of Robert Modell, even Lance Henriksen, who went on to play the lead role in Millennium. Initially, Gilligan considered Harvey Fierstein for the role of Modell, but Robert Wisden read the script and "blew us away". Rob Bowman was pleased with Wisden's performance and said, "I thought Robert Wisden was great as Pusher. He is a very energized kind of confident actor with lots of ideas of his own. It took me about a day and a half to get him into it, and then I never had to speak to him again, because he had that look in his eyes. I would walk up to talk to him about the scene and I could see that he was already there.

Mitch Pileggi was disappointed in the fact that the episode featured his character, Walter Skinner, getting beat up, something which had occurred in multiple episodes already by this point: "I was feeling a little uncomfortable with him getting his ass kicked so much, and I think the fans were, too." Dave Grohl, the lead singer and guitarist of Foo Fighters and former drummer for Nirvana, made a cameo, along with his then-wife Jennifer Youngblood, in the episode during the scene wherein Modell sneaks into the FBI building. Grohl, who has an active interest in UFO lore, called the episode "his acting debut".

== Themes ==
Robert Shearman, in his book Wanting to Believe: A Critical Guide to The X-Files, Millennium & The Lone Gunmen, wrote that the episode helps to illustrate the idea that "evil [is] a mundane and human and somewhat pathetic thing", a concept that they note is rooted in many third season episodes of The X-Files. The critic reasons that, despite Modell's ability, he is ultimately, "something of a loser" who wishes to "be special" rather than be cured of his brain disease. Furthermore, Shearman argues that Modell's boasting of being a samurai "is just a fantasy" that he plays up; he really is a "little man" who yearns "to be big". Critic A.J. Black notes that the character of Modell can be compared to the main characters in Gilligan's later shows, Breaking Bad and Better Call Saul: This sociopathic strain is clear in all of Gilligan's male monsters and such traits certainly bleed later into Walt and Saul/Jimmy. They are both underachievers who ‘break bad’ to prove something to themselves, let alone the world. Pusher is no different [...] Crucially, in the most acute parallel with Walter White, Modell is dying. “And he wants to go out in a blaze of glory,” Scully suggests. He won't be the last Gilligan monster to commit extreme acts while close to the end."

== Broadcast and reception ==
"Pusher" premiered on the Fox network in the United States on February 23, 1996. The episode earned a Nielsen household rating of 10.8, with an 18 share, meaning that roughly 10.8 percent of all television-equipped households, and 18 percent of households watching television, were tuned in to the episode. The episode was watched by a total of 16.2 million viewers.

"Pusher" received overwhelmingly positive reviews from television critics. Zack Handlen of The A.V. Club gave it an A−, describing it as "smart, well-paced, and exciting, and Modell is memorable for being a very human monster who manages to be both well-drawn and unsympathetic". Though he praised Modell and the climax, he felt that Holly was a stereotype and "the implication that Modell is able to get through to her because of her fear walks that weird line between plausible and not entirely necessary". Handlen also felt that it was "an excellent starting point" for someone who wanted to get into the series. Entertainment Weekly gave "Pusher" a B+, writing, "Much inscrutable warmth between Mulder and Scully parallels some inscrutable detective work. But the climactic mental tug-of-war between Mulder and Pusher makes up for any lapses in logic". Robert Shearman gave the episode a glowing review and rated it five stars out of five. The writer called Gilligan's script "witty and clever" and noted that it was "a triumph". Furthermore, Shearman praised Wisden's performance as Robert Modell, calling his portrayal "spot on". Paula Vitaris of Cinefantastique gave the episode a positive review and awarded it a rare four stars out of four. She called it an "intense nail biter" that "ranks with the best of The X-Files".

Since its airing, many reviewers list the episode as one of the best episodes of The X-Files. IGN named it the third best standalone episode of The X-Files, writing "[t]hough the episode is loaded with memorable scenes of terror [...] it's the emotional bond between our two leads that really resonates." Den of Geek listed "Pusher" as their seventh best episode of the series, and called it "a good game of cat and mouse". Xposé magazine named the Russian roulette scene one of the "20 Coolest Moments in The X-Files", ranking it at number eight; the magazine called the sequence "completely gripping".

In an interview with The X-Files Lexicon, Vince Gilligan, who wrote the episode, said: "That was a fun one to work on. I enjoyed that one."

== Bibliography ==
- Edwards, Ted (1996). X-Files Confidential. Little, Brown and Company. ISBN 0316218081.
- Hurwitz, Matt & Knowles, Chris (2008). The Complete X-Files: Behind the Series the Myths and the Movies. New York, US: Insight Editions. ISBN 978-1933784724.
- Lovece, Frank (1996). The X-Files Declassified. Citadel Press. ISBN 080651745X.
- Lowry, Brian (1996). Trust No One: The Official Guide to the X-Files. Harper Prism. ISBN 0061053538.
- Meisler, Andy (1999). Resist or Serve: The Official Guide to The X-Files, Vol. 4. London: HarperCollins. ISBN 0-00-257133-1.
- Shearman, Robert (2009). Wanting to Believe: A Critical Guide to The X-Files, Millennium & The Lone Gunmen. Mad Norwegian Press. ISBN 978-0-9759446-9-1.
