= Nosocomephobia =

Excessive fear of hospitals

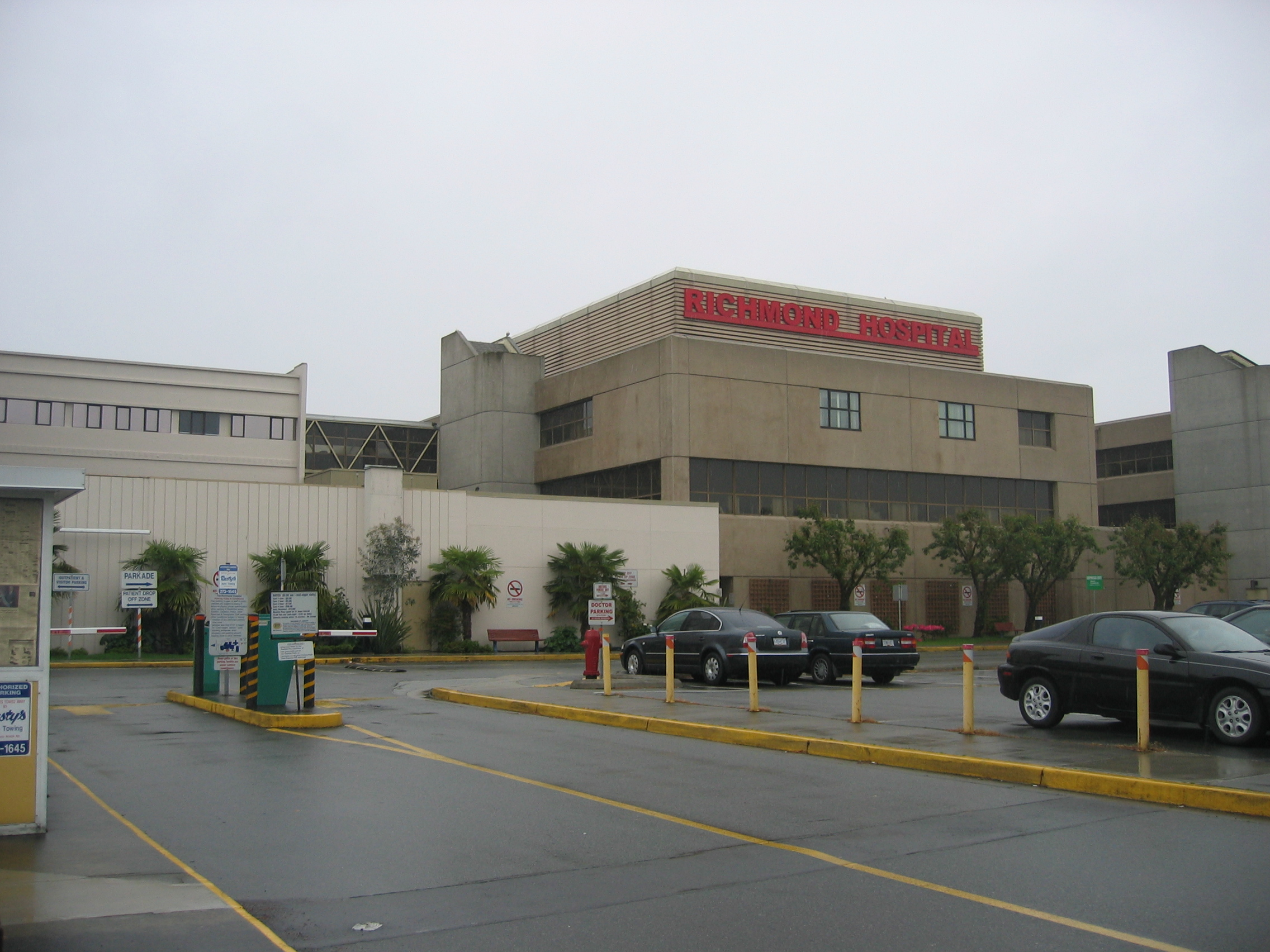
- Richmond Hospital, located in Richmond, British Columbia, Canada
- Specialty: Psychology

Nosocomephobia is defined as the excessive fear of hospitals.

Dr. Marc Siegel, a physician and clinical professor at New York University Medical Center says, "It's perfectly understandable why many people feel the way they do about a hospital stay," and continues, "You have control of your life ... up until you're admitted to a hospital."

Former U.S. President Richard Nixon allegedly had an irrational fear of hospitals, even purportedly refusing to get a treatment for a blood clot in 1974, saying, "if I go into the hospital, I'll never come out alive."

Nosocomephobia comes from the Greek νοσοκομεῖον (nosokomeion), "hospital" and φόβος (phobos), "fear".

== See also ==
- Nosophobia
- List of phobias
