= The X-Files Mythology, Volume 2 – Black Oil =

- Season 2
- Region 1 DVD cover
- No. of episodes: 15

Season chronology
- ← Previous; Volume 1 – Abduction Next → Volume 3 – Colonization

Volume 2 of The X-Files Mythology collection is the second DVD release containing selected episodes from the third to the fifth seasons of the American science fiction television series The X-Files. The episodes collected in the release form the middle of the series' mythology, and are centered on the discovery of a mind-altering extraterrestrial "black oil".

The collection contains five episodes from the third season, eight from the fourth season, and two from the fifth. The episodes follow the investigations of paranormal-related cases, or X-Files, by FBI Special Agents Fox Mulder (David Duchovny) and Dana Scully (Gillian Anderson). Mulder is a believer in the paranormal, while the skeptical Scully has been assigned to debunk his work. Events covered in the episodes include the assassination of a secretive informant, Scully's diagnosis with cancer and Mulder's apparent suicide.

Production for many of the episodes included in the collection required extensive effects. The titular black oil's on-screen appearance was achieved through visual effects; the shimmering oil effect was digitally placed over the actors' corneas in post-production. Steven Williams, William B. Davis, Mitch Pileggi and Laurie Holden all play supporting roles in the collection. Released on August 2, 2005, the collection received mostly positive reviews from critics.

== Plot summary ==
The collection opens with the two-part episodes "Nisei" and "731". Investigating evidence of an alien autopsy, FBI special agent Fox Mulder (David Duchovny) infiltrates a secretive government train carriage carrying an alien-human hybrid. Mulder is almost killed by a Syndicate operative guarding the hybrid, but is saved by his informant X (Steven Williams). X had been tipped off about Mulder's activities by the agent's partner Dana Scully (Gillian Anderson). Scully, meanwhile, meets a group of women with abduction experiences similar to her own, and meets another member of the Syndicate known as the First Elder (Don S. Williams), who claims during her abduction she was placed on a similar train car and experimented upon by the Japanese scientists.

The crew of a French salvage ship trying to raise a World War II–era submarine from the sea floor are stricken with massive radiation burns—except for one, who has been infected with a parasitic black oil discovered on the submarine. The oil, controlling the crewman's body, passes into the crewman's wife and travels to Hong Kong in pursuit of a middleman selling government secrets, who Mulder has also been pursuing. After Mulder catches Alex Krycek (Nicholas Lea) in Hong Kong, the oil passes itself to Krycek. Scully finds that the submarine had been involved in discovering the oil on the sea floor during World War II, under the guise of finding a sunken fighter plane. The infected Krycek makes his way to a missile silo used to hide a UFO, and the oil escapes his body to board the craft. Meanwhile, Scully has tracked down Luis Cardinal, the man responsible for killing her sister.

When the Syndicate suspect that one of their members is passing information to Mulder and Scully, they organise a canary trap to find the leak, using information about the safety of Mulder's mother as bait. X's role as an informant is discovered, and he is shot dead, although he is able to pass along the name of another informant who can be of use to Mulder—Marita Covarrubias (Laurie Holden), the Special Representative to the Secretary-General of the United Nations. Covarrubias' aid is sought when Mulder attempts to reach Tunguska in Russia to investigate the source of a further black oil contamination. Whilst there, Mulder is held in a gulag and used as a successful test subject for a black oil vaccine. He escapes and is able to return to America, having found that Krycek is working with the Russians.

Having been diagnosed with cancer, Scully is unsure of her future with the FBI. Mulder is convinced that her condition is a result of her earlier abduction, and is prepared to make a deal with the Syndicate to find a cure. He is dissuaded by Walter Skinner (Mitch Pileggi), who secretly makes such a deal instead. While being pursued by an assassin responsible for a hoax alien corpse discovered on a mountaintop, Mulder fakes his own suicide, mutilating the assassin's face to provide a decoy body. He uses the distraction this offers to infiltrate The Pentagon to find a cure for Scully's cancer, while Scully is able to uncover and reveal a Syndicate connection within the FBI.

== Background ==
During the third season the black oil was introduced, an alien entity that invaded bodies and made them into living hosts. The black oil was able to enter through a victim's mouth, eyes or nose; it would leave a victim's body to revert to its original form or find a new host. The oil is revealed to be a tool used by the Colonists, brought to Earth by meteorites to create hosts of the human population living there. The fourth season episodes "Tunguska" and "Terma" were conceived by the writers when they were trying to conceive a "big and fun canvas" to tell stories. They decided to create a story which had connections to the Russian gulags, which led to the "natural" idea that the Russians were experimenting separately from the Syndicate to create a vaccine for the black oil. Writer John Shiban felt it was natural creating an arms race-like story between the United States and Russia, being that the Cold War had ended a few years earlier. The inspiration for the oil-containing rocks was NASA's announcement of possible evidence of extraterrestrial life in the Allan Hills 84001 meteorite; while the gulag scenes were based on Aleksandr Solzhenitsyn's books The Gulag Archipelago and One Day in the Life of Ivan Denisovich

The on-screen appearance of the black oil was achieved through visual effects; the shimmering oil effect was digitally placed over the actors' corneas in post-production. The crew went through various iterations to find the two "right" types of fluids. According to physical effects crewman David Gauthier, they used a mix of oil and acetone, which he believed gave the substance a more globular look. During the filming of "Apocrypha", Nicholas Lea was fitted with a mask with tubes for the scene where the alien black oil leaves his body. Lea said filming the scene was horrible, and the scene ended up having to be filmed again a few days later. A similar scene from the start of the episode with the submarine captain was accomplished using a dummy head.

The decision to have the character of X killed off in "Herrenvolk" was made at the end of the third season. The writers felt that they could only do so much with the character and decided that they would either make him a bigger character in the series, or have him pay the price for collaborating with Mulder. The show's producers decided to give Gillian Anderson's character Dana Scully cancer early in the fourth season. Carter initially discussed giving Scully's mother cancer but decided to have Scully suffer from it instead. Carter felt the move would give the show an interesting platform on which to discuss things such as faith, science, health care and a certain element of the paranormal. Some of the writing staff felt that the decision was a poor one to make, citing it as "a cheap TV thing". However, Frank Spotnitz felt that, given the appearances of cancer-stricken abductees in previous episodes, it was an "obligatory" move to have Scully follow suit.

== Reception ==
Released on August 2, 2005, the collection has received generally positive reviews from critics. Slant Magazine's Keith Uhlich rated it three-and-a-half stars out of five, noting that there is "an unabashed confidence to these episodes", although this "comes with something of a price as the thrill and surprise of season two mythology stories like "Colony" and "End Game" are replaced by a nagging suspicion that the writers are starting to tread water". Uhlich singles out "Talitha Cumi" as the collection's highlight, calling it "an overall mindblower". Writing for DVD Talk, Jeffrey Robinson was impressed with the collection, calling it "highly recommended". However, he felt that the cohesion between the episodes was lacking somewhat, and that the two-part episodes "Tempus Fugit" and "Max" did not add much to the overall storyline. Exclaim!'s Monica S. Kuebler, on the other hand, felt negatively about the collection. She too felt that the interrupted nature of the episodes caused a lack of "believable" pacing, and noted that the release "feels like a blatant cash grab by Fox to milk an old franchise while they still can".

== Episodes ==
No. in set	No. in series	Title	Directed by	Written by	Original release date	Prod. code
1	58	"Nisei"	David Nutter	Chris Carter & Howard Gordon & Frank Spotnitz	November 24, 1995	3X09
While investigating a videotape of an alleged alien autopsy, the agents uncover possible proof of the government making contact with extraterrestrials.
2	59	"731"	Rob Bowman	Frank Spotnitz	December 1, 1995	3X10
Mulder is trapped on a speeding train with a government assassin, a bomb about to go off and a virus that could kill everyone aboard.
3	64	"Piper Maru"	Rob Bowman	Frank Spotnitz & Chris Carter	February 9, 1996	3X15
The agents face an old foe while dealing with a radioactive entity unleashed from a sunken World War II submarine.
4	65	"Apocrypha"	Kim Manners	Frank Spotnitz & Chris Carter	February 16, 1996	3X16
Scully learns more about her sister's murder while Mulder goes after the alien entity possessing Krycek.
5	73	"Talitha Cumi"	R. W. Goodwin	Chris Carter	May 17, 1996	3X24
A supernatural being with the power to heal gives the agents clues to a mysterious alien conspiracy only referred to as "the project".
6	74	"Herrenvolk"	R. W. Goodwin	Chris Carter	October 4, 1996	4X01
In order to save his dying mother, Mulder must protect the extraterrestrial healer, Jeremiah Smith, from the alien bounty hunter.
7	81	"Tunguska"	Kim Manners	Chris Carter & Frank Spotnitz	November 24, 1996	4X08
The agents must determine the origin of a strange rock where they discover a deadly, vicious organism inside.
8	82	"Terma"	Rob Bowman	Chris Carter & Frank Spotnitz	December 1, 1996	4X09
To prove that the organism inside the rock is an alien lifeform, Mulder teams up with Krycek and learns the shocking depths of his deception.
9	87	"Memento Mori"	Rob Bowman	Chris Carter & Vince Gilligan & John Shiban & Frank Spotnitz	February 9, 1997	4X14
Scully tries to live with her cancer, while Mulder and the Lone Gunmen break into a high-security research lab to find a possible cure.
10	90	"Tempus Fugit"	Rob Bowman	Chris Carter & Frank Spotnitz	March 16, 1997	4X17
The agents investigate an unexplained crash of a commercial airliner, and their search for answers leads them to the bottom of a desolate lake and a startling discovery.
11	91	"Max"	Kim Manners	Chris Carter & Frank Spotnitz	March 23, 1997	4X18
Mulder and Scully attempt to prove that the military deliberately sacrificed the passengers of the doomed airliner for stolen alien technology.
12	94	"Zero Sum"	Kim Manners	Howard Gordon & Frank Spotnitz	April 27, 1997	4X21
As part of a deal to save Scully's life, Skinner is forced to help the Cigarette Smoking Man destroy evidence of a fatal bee attack, but finds that he's being framed for murder.
13	97	"Gethsemane"	R. W. Goodwin	Chris Carter	May 18, 1997	4X24
Mulder tries to prove that a discovery frozen in the mountains of Canada is proof of extraterrestrial life, but his quest for the truth only leads to more lies ... and an unthinkable conclusion.
14	98	"Redux"	R. W. Goodwin	Chris Carter	November 2, 1997	5X01
To find a possible cure for Scully's cancer, Mulder sneaks into a secret research facility where he discovers the startling origins of his partner's illness.
15	99	"Redux II"	Kim Manners	Chris Carter	November 9, 1997	5X02
With Scully lying comatose in a hospital bed, Mulder receives crucial information from the Cigarette Smoking Man that could mean life or death for her.

== Special features ==
The X-Files Mythology, Volume 2 – Black Oil
Set Details		Special Features	
15 Episodes; 4-Disc Set; 1.78:1 Aspect Ratio; Subtitles: English; English (Dolby Digital 5.1 Surround)		Audio Commentaries (Dolby Digital 2.0 Stereo); Commentary by director R.W. Goodwin on "Talitha Cumi"; Commentary by director Rob Bowman on "Memento Mori"; Commentary by director Kim Manners on "Max"; Threads of Mythology; Mythology Timeline	
Release Dates
United States; Canada	Australia	Japan	United Kingdom
August 2, 2005	TBA	TBA	TBA
