= Patient X (The X-Files) =

- The X-Files episode
- Dmitri, a young Kazakh, is infected by the black oil.
- Episode no.: Season 5 Episode 13
- Directed by: Kim Manners
- Written by: Chris Carter; Frank Spotnitz
- Production code: 5X13
- Original air date: March 1, 1998
- Running time: 45 minutes

Guest appearances
- Nicholas Lea as Alex Krycek; Laurie Holden as Marita Covarrubias; Don S. Williams as First Elder; John Moore as Third Elder; Brian Thompson as Bounty Hunter; John Neville as Well-Manicured Man; Chris Owens as Jeffrey Spender; Veronica Cartwright as Cassandra Spender; Willy Ross as Quiet Willy; Jim Jansen as Heitz Werber; Alex Shostak Jr. as Dmitri; Ron Halder as Dr. Floyd Fazio; Kurt Max Bunte as Ranger; Raoul Ganeev as Guard; Max Wyman as Dr. Lagerqvist; Barbara Dyke as Dr. Alepin; Bruno Verdoni as UN Officer; Andrew Star as Dmitri's Friend; Anatol Rezmeritsa as Commandant; Oleg Feoktistov as Doctor; Chapelle Jaffe as Syndicate Doctor; Allen Franz as Man in VW Van

Episode chronology
← Previous "Bad Blood"	Next → "The Red and the Black"
- The X-Files season 5

"Patient X" is the thirteenth episode of the fifth season of American science fiction television series The X-Files. It was written by series creator Chris Carter and Frank Spotnitz, directed by Kim Manners and aired in the United States on March 1, 1998, on the Fox network. The episode earned a Nielsen household rating of 12.6, being watched by 20.21 million people in its initial broadcast. The episode received moderately positive reviews from critics.

The show centers on FBI special agents Fox Mulder (David Duchovny) and Dana Scully (Gillian Anderson) who work on cases linked to the paranormal, called X-Files. Mulder is a believer in the paranormal, while the skeptical Scully has been assigned to debunk his work. In this episode, as a rebel alien race secretly attacks several groups of former alien abductees, the agents meet Cassandra Spender (Veronica Cartwright), a woman who claims to be a multiple abductee and wants to deliver a positive message about aliens. Agent Mulder, now skeptical about extraterrestrial activity, is disturbed when Agent Scully forms a special bond with the woman.

"Patient X" was a story milestone for the series. It introduced several new recurring characters for the series. It was the first episode to feature Chris Owens as Jeffrey Spender and Veronica Cartwright as Cassandra Spender. It is the first of a two-part story that concludes with the following episode, "The Red and the Black". "Patient X" continued the series' mythology arc that followed the earlier episodes "Piper Maru", "Apocrypha", "Tunguska", "Terma", "Zero Sum", "Gethsemane", "Redux", and "Redux II".

== Plot ==
In Kazakhstan, two young boys see an unknown object fall from the sky. Seconds later, they witness a man being burned alive, and one of the boys is killed by an Alien Rebel who has his eyes and mouth sewn shut. The next day, Marita Covarrubias (Laurie Holden) leads an investigation of UN peacekeepers of the area. She runs into Alex Krycek (Nicholas Lea) and a unit of Russian Army soldiers who caught caught Dmitri, the other Kazakh boy. Krycek tells Marita to tell her superiors that "it is all going to hell".

Meanwhile, Fox Mulder (David Duchovny) attends a lecture at MIT, where the testimony of Cassandra Spender (Veronica Cartwright), an alien abductee, is being presented. Mulder argues against other members of the lecture over the existence of alien life, claiming that it is a lie created to cover up a program of medical experimentation on civilians run by the military industrial complex. When the lecture ends, Mulder is met by Dr. Heitz Werber, who is surprised to see that Mulder has lost his belief in alien life since the last time they met. Werber tells Mulder that he is Cassandra's doctor, and asks him to visit her.

Meanwhile, Krycek, who has beaten Dmitri into telling him what he saw, orders his Russian colleagues to infect him with the black oil. Back in the United States, Werber introduces Mulder to Cassandra, who considers him a hero of hers. She claims that the aliens are in a state of upheaval and that she will be abducted by them again. Mulder tells Cassandra there is nothing he can do for her and leaves.

In Russia, Krycek, working against the orders of his superiors, kidnaps the infected Dmitri and flees to the U.S., sewing shut the boy's eyes, nose, and mouth to keep the black oil from leaving his body. At FBI headquarters, Dana Scully (Gillian Anderson) meets Agent Jeffrey Spender (Chris Owens), Cassandra's son, who fears the damage to his reputation if his colleagues learn about his mother. He tells Scully to keep Mulder away from her.

Marita reports to the Syndicate, which expected colonization at a much later date. Krycek offers Dmitri to the Syndicate in exchange for all their research on a vaccine. Meanwhile, Scully talks to Mulder about his meeting with Cassandra. She realizes that she has much in common with Cassandra, including being abducted at Skyland Mountain and having an implant inserted in the base of her neck. Scully visits Cassandra, who immediately realizes that she's a fellow abductee. Scully tells her not to remove the implant. Cassandra assures Scully that she never will, as she looks forward to being abducted again.

A group of abductees meet at Skyland Mountain and are burned alive by more faceless Alien Rebels. Scully and Mulder visit the scene, with Mulder continuing to be very skeptical of any alien involvement. The Syndicate is shocked by the massacre. Mulder and Scully visit Cassandra again, who knew many of the people who died. They encounter Spender, who is upset about their visit with his mother. Krycek is met by Marita and it is revealed that they are secretly lovers, conspiring against the Syndicate. When Krycek returns to the cell where Dmitri is held, he finds him gone, and the Well-Manicured Man there instead.

Mulder finds that the victims of the attack had implants in their necks and all claimed to be abductees. He believes they were led there by the military, not aliens. Mulder is called by Marita, who kidnapped Dmitri. Dmitri pulls the stitches off his eyes, resulting in Marita getting infected with the black oil. Mulder calls Cassandra, looking for Scully, but Jeffrey answers and reveals that Cassandra is gone. At that moment Cassandra is with a group of abductees, including Scully and Dmitri, at the Ruskin Dam, brought there by Syndicate assassin Quiet Willy. The abductees see a UFO appear in the sky. Suddenly screams are uttered as a man is set on fire and two faceless aliens arrive.

== Production ==
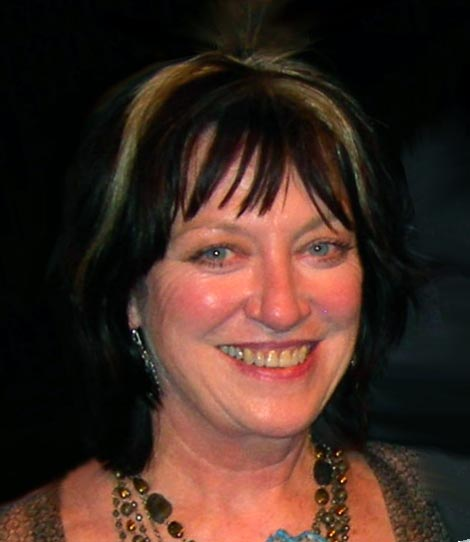
Veronica Cartwright's performance in the episode was lauded by critics and resulted in an Emmy nomination.

=== Casting ===
This episode marks the first appearance of Chris Owens as Jeffrey Spender. Owens previously appeared in earlier episodes, the first being "Musings of a Cigarette Smoking Man", in which he played the younger version of The Smoking Man. Owens later reprised this role in episode "Demons". During the fifth season of the show, Owens was cast as The Great Mutato in "The Post-Modern Prometheus". After his stint on The X-Files, Owens attempted to get a job as a waiter in Vancouver, to no avail. One day, however, he ran into series creator Chris Carter at a bar, who humorously told him, "I didn't know they served guys with two faces here", a reference to his portrayal of The Great Mutato. Carter explained that David Duchovny had "taken careful notice" of Owens' acting abilities and requested that he return to the series in some capacity. Heeding Duchovny's advice, Carter created the role of Jeffrey Spender just for him.

"Patient X" also introduced the recurring character of Cassandra Spender, played by Veronica Cartwright. Rick Millikan, the series' casting director, was very pleased with Cartwright's performance, noting, "She's got a voice that adds a little creepiness and a little mystery that I thought played really well. She was just the perfect X-Files person."

Because the script called for a number of Russian characters to appear, the show's casting scouts hired a number of Russian expatriates living in the Vancouver, British Columbia, area. Alex Shostak Jr., a teenage Ukrainian immigrant, was selected to play Dmitri. He worked 12–14 hours a day, much of which was spent applying the elaborate make-up effect that gave the appearance that his eyes and mouth had been sewed up. During filming, he was "literally" blind and guided by the crew members throughout the filming of his scenes. When it came to the dialogue, Shostak provided the Russian translation for his own lines.

Both Nicholas Lea and Laurie Holden had to learn Russian for the episode, which, according to the former "was 'not hard'." Holden and Lea worked diligently together to perfect their pronunciation, with Holden explaining, "We'd come up with these fun ways to test ourselves to know if we had really nailed it. Show tunes come to mind, but I also remember this one time my dialect coach had me call a Russian friend of his on his cell phone to see if he could understand me. I passed the test." "Patient X" was the first episode in which Lea was credited under the Also Starring tag, alongside Mitch Pileggi and William B. Davis.

=== Filming and visual effects ===
Filming the scene with the burning camp was "tricky", according to Kim Manners, as the production crew was forced to follow a number of limiting safety precautions.

To light the fires in the episode, the crew made use of propane. Manners wanted the shots to be as close to the fire as possible, so they also used fireproof cameras. According to Manners, "They used a half a million dollar camera on a crane wrapped in asbestos" and ran it through the fire. For the scene in which the alien rebels incinerate people, the production crew used a "very dangerous" stunt known as a "full burn", in which a person is set on fire with the aid of a special suit. In total, the stuntman who performed in the scene was on fire for about 30 seconds—quite a long time by filming standards. Special effects supervisor Toby Lindala supervised the creation of the faceless alien rebels, Dmitri's mutilation, and the incinerated victims of the rebels. Lindala also designed the rig used to infect Dmitri with the black oil.

The set for the Russian gulag was erected at North Shore Studios, under production designer Graeme Murray's supervision. The ship scenes were filmed at a warehouse in Vancouver. When filming the Syndicate meeting, Manners wanted Marita Covarrubias to look as strong as possible since this marked the first appearance of a woman in the Syndicate meeting room. Since very little movement occurs during these scenes, the director tried to make things visually interesting by mixing wide shots with unique camera angles.

== Reception ==
"Patient X" premiered in the United States on the Fox network on March 1, 1998. This episode earned a Nielsen rating of 12.6, with a 19 share, meaning that roughly 12.6 percent of all television-equipped households, and 19 percent of households watching television, were tuned in to the episode. It was viewed by 20.21 million viewers. Veronica Cartwright was nominated in the category "Outstanding Guest Actress in a Drama Series" in the 1998 Emmy Awards for her performance in this episode and its follow-up, "The Red and the Black". The episode was later included on The X-Files Mythology, Volume 3 – Colonization, a DVD collection that contains episodes involved with the alien Colonist's plans to take over the earth.

Critical reception to the episode was largely positive. Television Without Pity ranked "Patient X" the eighth most nightmare-inducing episode of the show, citing, in particular the abuse of Dmitri. The article noted that "If The X-Files has taught us anything, it’s that if a G-Man asks us if we know anything about anything and we foolishly say yes, our mouths and eyelids will be sewn shut and we will be brainwashed to kill on demand." The A.V. Club reviewer Emily VanDerWerff gave "Patient X" a B+, and wrote that the episode "feels epic, in a way the mythology episodes do at their best". However, VanDerWerff noted that "The problem with breaking the status quo on a TV series is that your audience is always going to know in the back of its head that the status quo isn’t really broken." She reasoned that the audience never fully believed that "Mulder could lose his belief in the all-consuming alien conspiracy" or accept the idea that "Scully could find herself dabbling with belief in [aliens]." Despite these setbacks, however, she noted that "Patient X" was the episode where the series' mythology "gets moving again, after chasing its own tail throughout much of season four and reaching a sort of climax in the opening episodes of season five." Robert Shearman and Lars Pearson, in their book Wanting to Believe: A Critical Guide to The X-Files, Millennium & The Lone Gunmen, rated the episode four stars out of five. The two described the tone of "Patient X" as "truly visceral", citing the faceless men incinerating people as well as the mutilation of the innocent Dmitri, who was "at the wrong place at the wrong time". Furthermore, Shearman and Pearson praised the episode for "shift[ing] the goalposts" and allowing Mulder and Scully to switch roles as the believer and skeptic. Paula Vitaris from Cinefantastique gave the episode a moderately positive review and awarded it two-and-a-half stars out of four. Vitaris praised the episode's premise and writing. "'Patient X' is a rare episode in that it actually advances The X-Files mythology, with the news of a vaccine to combat the black oil". However, she was critical of the episode's reliance on shock value, noting that the "camera seems to take a perverse delight in death, pain, and mutilation, with the distressing effect of numbing the viewer to the horror."

== Bibliography ==
- Fraga, Erica (2010). LAX-Files: Behind the Scenes with the Los Angeles Cast and Crew. CreateSpace. ISBN 9781451503418.
- Hurwitz, Matt & Knowles, Chris (2008). The Complete X-Files: Behind the Series the Myths and the Movies. New York, US: Insight Editions. ISBN 978-1-933784-72-4.
- Meisler, Andy (1998), I Want to Believe: The Official Guide to the X-Files, Vol. 3, Perennial Currents, ISBN 0-06-105386-4
- Meisler, Andy (1999), Resist or Serve: The Official Guide to The X-Files, Vol. 4, London: HarperCollins, ISBN 0-00-257133-1
- Shearman, Robert; Pearson, Lars (2009). Wanting to Believe: A Critical Guide to The X-Files, Millennium & The Lone Gunmen. Mad Norwegian Press. ISBN 978-0-9759446-9-1.
