= The Red and the Black (The X-Files) =

- The X-Files episode
- Episode no.: Season 5 Episode 14
- Directed by: Chris Carter
- Written by: Chris Carter; Frank Spotnitz
- Production code: 5X14
- Original air date: March 8, 1998
- Running time: 45 minutes

Guest appearances
- Mitch Pileggi as Walter Skinner; Chris Owens as Jeffrey Spender; Nicholas Lea as Alex Krycek; Veronica Cartwright as Cassandra Spender; Laurie Holden as Marita Covarrubias; William B. Davis as Cigarette Smoking Man; John Neville as Well-Manicured Man; Don S. Williams as First Elder; George Murdock as Second Elder; John Moore as Third Elder; Willy Ross as Quiet Willy; Brian Thompson as The Bounty Hunter; Alex Shostak Jr as Dmitri; Jim Jansen as Dr. Heitz Werber; Chapelle Jaffe as Dr. Paton; Miehal Suchanek as Young Jeffrey Spender; Derek Thomas Versteeg as MP; Jack Finn as Young Boy; Jenn Forgie as Nurse; Klodyne Rodney as Medic

Episode chronology
← Previous "Patient X"	Next → "Travelers"
- The X-Files season 5

"The Red and the Black" is the fourteenth episode of the fifth season of American science fiction television series The X-Files. It was written by series creator Chris Carter and Frank Spotnitz, directed by Carter and aired in the United States on March 8, 1998, on the Fox network. The episode earned a Nielsen household rating of 12.0, being watched by 19.98 million people in its initial broadcast. The episode received moderately positive reviews from critics.

The show centers on FBI special agents Fox Mulder (David Duchovny) and Dana Scully (Gillian Anderson) who work on cases linked to the paranormal, called X-Files. Mulder is a believer in the paranormal, while the skeptical Scully has been assigned to debunk his work. In this episode, Mulder has Scully put under hypnosis to learn the truth about her abduction after Cassandra Spender (Veronica Cartwright) goes missing and her son Jeffrey (Chris Owens) angrily attempts to push his way up in the FBI. The Syndicate, meanwhile, quicken their tests for the black oil vaccine, sacrificing their own to do so.

"The Red and the Black" continues from the previous episode, "Patient X" and features the return of Mulder's belief in extraterrestrials, a belief he initially lost in the season opener "Redux". "The Red and the Black" continued the series' mythology arc following the earlier episodes "Piper Maru", "Apocrypha", "Tunguska", "Terma", "Zero Sum", "Gethsemane", "Redux", "Redux II", and "Patient X". Director Rob Bowman was originally slated to direct the episode, but filming issues resulted in Carter directing it. Carter later described the episode, along with "Patient X", as being "the most challenging and logically complex projects of the season."

== Plot ==
In the mountain wilderness of Canada, someone in a cabin writes a letter addressed to "Son" and expresses hopes that they may reconcile. The envelope is addressed to the FBI, and is given to a boy courier for mailing.

Fox Mulder (David Duchovny) arrives at the Ruskin Dam and finds a number of burned corpses, including those belonging to Quiet Willy and Dmitri. Dana Scully (Gillian Anderson) is found with only minor burns, one of approximately fifty survivors who were found nearby in the woods. Jeffrey Spender arrives looking for his mother, Cassandra (Veronica Cartwright), who is missing. Mulder meets with Scully about the incident, but she does not remember anything. Jeffrey sees Mulder and warns him not to get involved with his mother, who remains missing.

The Well-Manicured Man (John Neville) and other Syndicate Elders watch as their black oil vaccine is administered to Marita Covarrubias (Laurie Holden), which has yet to work. Later, The Well-Manicured Man meets with Alex Krycek (Nicholas Lea), who is being held captive aboard a Russian freighter. The Well-Manicured Man believes that the Russians possess a functional vaccine to the black oil, or else Krycek would not have infected the boy. With a working vaccine, resistance to the alien Colonists is possible.

A spacecraft crashes at Wiekamp Air Force base in West Virginia, and the surviving Rebel passenger is captured by the military. Mulder shows Scully more photos of the victims and, having found more implants in them, believes the implant in Scully may be able to answer all of their questions. The Syndicate meets over the capture of the Rebel. The Well-Manicured Man informs them of the existence of the Russian vaccine, believing that this makes resistance to the Colonists possible. If the vaccine is ineffective he proposes avoiding handing over the Rebel and instead forming an alliance with the Rebels, but the other Syndicate members believe this would be a suicidal course of action.

Under hypnosis, Scully recalls the Rebels burning her fellow abductees, as well as a Colonist spacecraft killing the Rebels and abducting Cassandra. During a meeting with Walter Skinner, Mulder continues to insist that the events have been orchestrated by the military and not by aliens. Meanwhile, the Russian vaccine seems to have no effect on Marita. The First Elder tells the Well-Manicured Man that they have already decided to turn the Rebel over to the Colonists. Jeffrey shows Scully a video of him talking about aliens while under hypnosis while he was a child, claiming his mother had forced him to make those statements.

Krycek is released and attacks Mulder in his apartment. He claims that a war is raging between the aliens and that the Rebel immolations are meant to halt the impending colonization of Earth. He also claims that the captured Rebel is critical to their plans and must not die. Scully visits Mulder and reveals she has been reconsidering her memories of abduction, while Mulder reveals he is newly taking them seriously as a result of his encounter with Krycek. Mulder and Scully head to Wiekamp Air Force Base, where the Alien Bounty Hunter—who is disguised as Quiet Willy—has come to kill the Rebel. However, Mulder witnesses a second Rebel arriving to seemingly kill the Bounty Hunter and rescue the captured Rebel. The Well-Manicured Man watches as the Russian vaccine is revealed to have been successful on Marita. Mulder is released by the military but is confused by what he saw. At FBI Headquarters, Spender receives the letter from Canada. In Canada, the boy returns the unopened letter to the cabin and the sender is revealed to be The Smoking Man (William B. Davis).

== Production ==
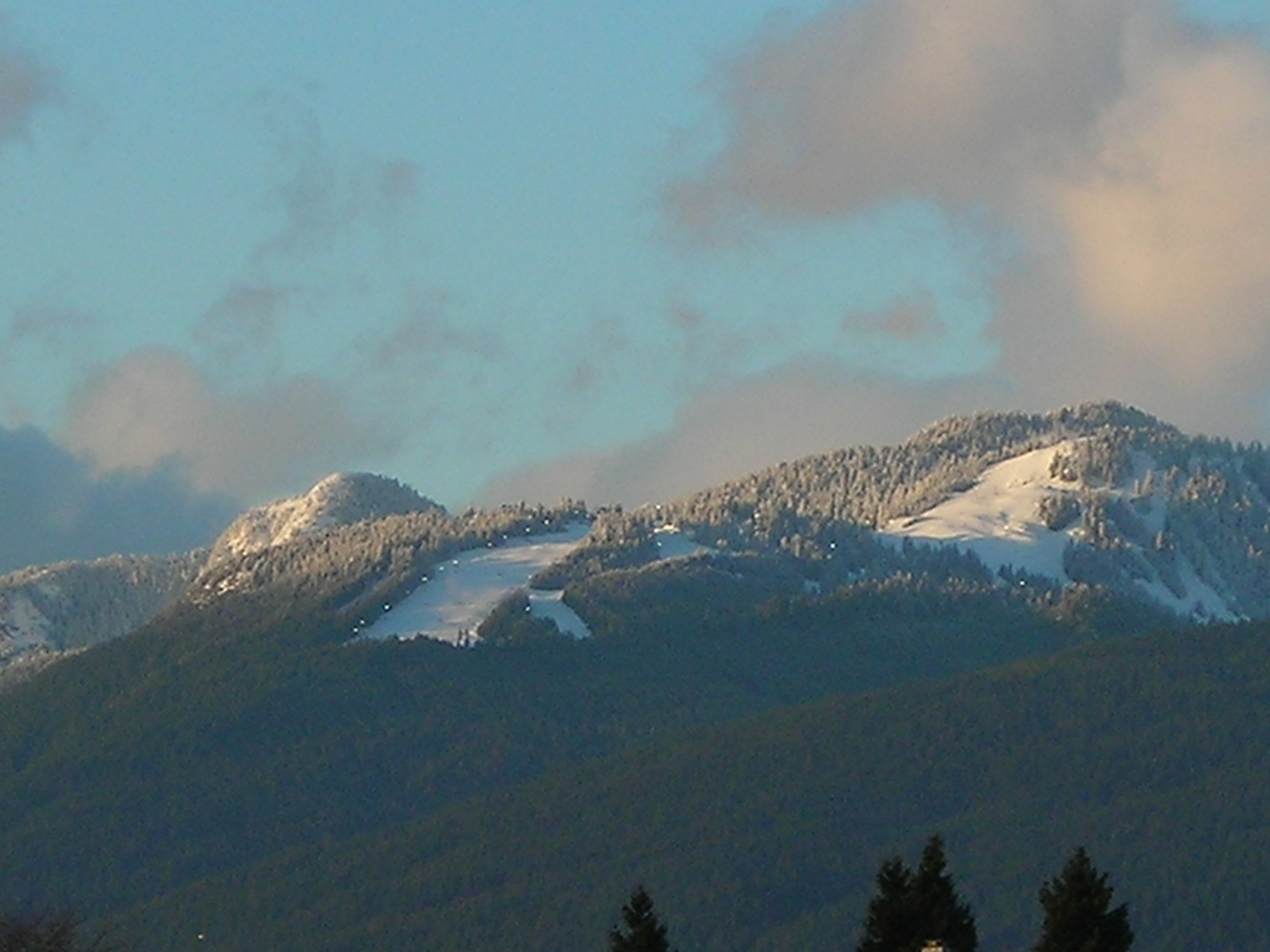
The opening of the episode was filmed at Grouse Mountain, near Vancouver.

=== Casting and filming ===
According to series creator Chris Carter, the cast list for the episode, along with "Patient X" was "longer than most cast lists you'll ever see on a TV series". This meant that the episode was substantially more expensive to film; the crew managed to talk Fox into allocating the money by arguing that the plot of the two episodes was "all leading up to [...] when the X-Files movie would be released." Rob Bowman originally intended to direct the episode but, due to reshoots, he was unable to do it, resulting in Carter assuming directorial duties. Bowman later recounted, "I was supposed to direct 'The Red and the Black' […] but we were prepping for the reshoots [of The X-Files movie] so I couldn't do it. […] Chris had to direct this episode. He was so mad at me." When filming the scene where Mulder and Scully go to a medic station, Carter made homage to the medical drama ER, filming it entirely with a Steadicam.

The opening scene was filmed at Grouse Mountain, north of Vancouver, British Columbia, Canada. Most of the scenes at the Ruskin Dam were shot approximately 50 miles (80 km) east of Vancouver, while the abduction sequence set at this location involved a full-scale replica of the dam being built on a soundstage. The various scenes with the Syndicate testing the black oil vaccine on Marita Covarrubias were filmed at an abandoned hospital in Vancouver. The show selected the site because, according to Carter, it had "an interesting observation space above it that we used", which in the end proved to be a difficult place to film.

=== Effects ===
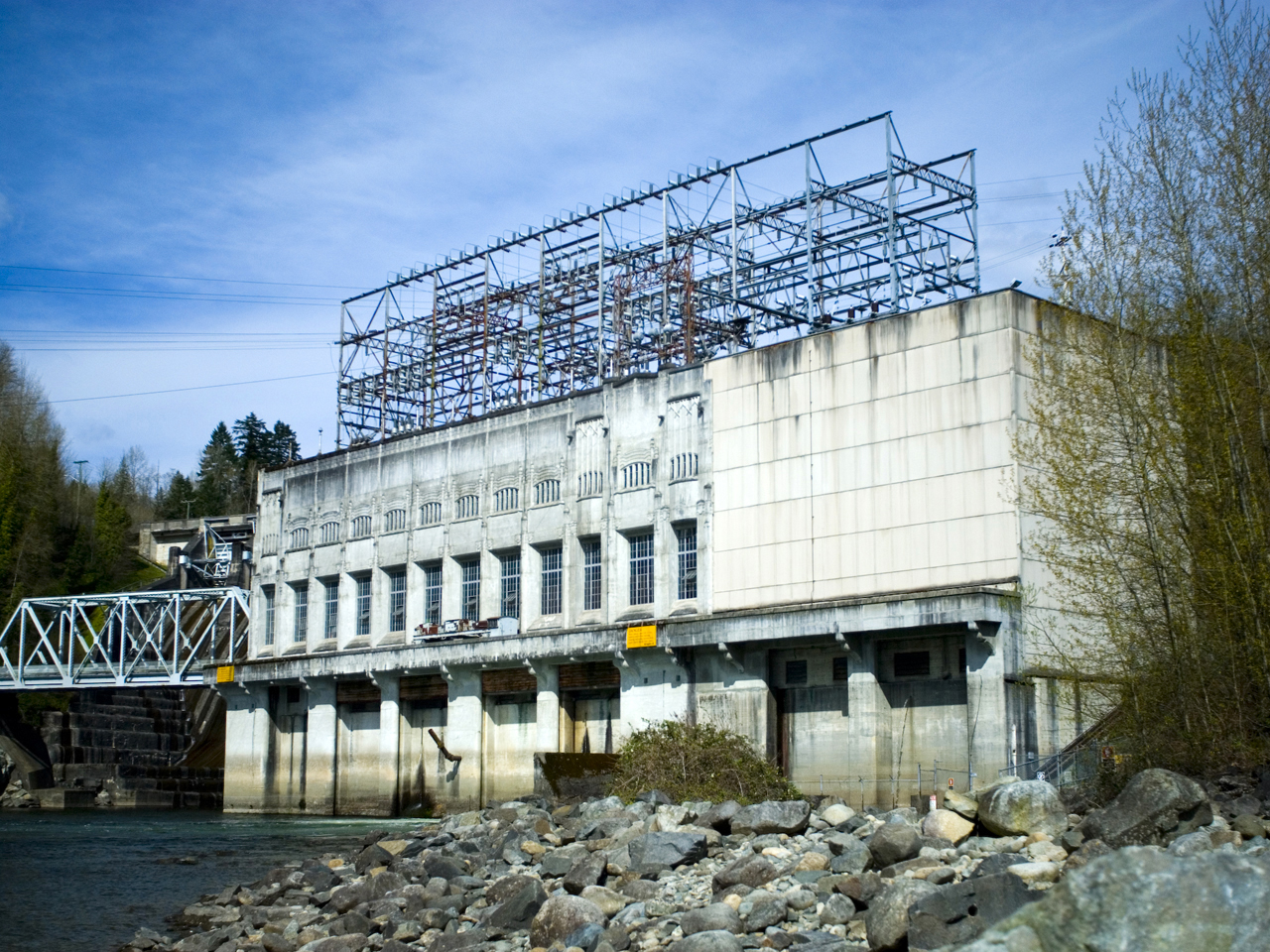
A full-scale replica of the Ruskin Dam bridge was created for the episode.

"The Red and the Black" was a technically demanding episode, which Carter later described, along with "Patient X", as "the most challenging and logically complex [project] of the season." The scene where Cassandra Spender is elevated into a colonist craft was shot by having a stuntwoman sit in a wheelchair, which was then lifted upward via a crane; the crane was then removed during post-production editing. The alien ship's lights were created with a lighting rig augmented by computer effects. The crashed alien spacecraft was sixty feet in diameter—twice the length of any other spaceship seen before on the show—and was forcibly dragged across the ground to create a deep gash in the earth. Twenty-five explosions were set off to simulate the saucer crash; the remains of the wreckage were then burned and filmed. The scene took a full night of production to shoot.

The opening scene featuring the alien rebels incinerating a group of Russian abductees was filmed without actual Russian cars. Picture car coordination Nigel Habgood noted, "I couldn't get real Russian cars, so I decided to get creative and go seriously European. We burned a couple Saabs, and a BMW 2002. I'm sorry we couldn't get any Yugos." For the scene in which Mulder discovers the charred remains of abductees, the prop and the production design departments had to create specialized fake bodies. Carter later noted that it's "harder than it looks to create a charred, dead body." The tagline for this episode is "Resist or Serve". The tagline was later used for The X-Files game, The X-Files: Resist or Serve as well as the official book covering the fifth season of the show.

== Reception ==
"The Red and the Black" premiered on the Fox network in the United States on March 8, 1998. This episode earned a Nielsen rating of 12.0, with an 18 share, meaning that roughly 12.0 percent of all television-equipped households, and 18 percent of households watching television, were tuned in to the episode. It was viewed by 19.98 million viewers. The episode was later included on The X-Files Mythology, Volume 3 – Colonization, a DVD collection that contains episodes involved with the alien Colonist's plans to take over the earth.

Critical reception to the episode was largely positive. The A.V. Club reviewer Zack Handlen gave "The Red and the Black" an A−, and wrote positively of the "galactic war" between the colonists and the rebels that is referenced in the episode, noting that it marked the point where "shit is about to get real". Despite this, Handlen criticized the series for not following through on its tale of alien war, noting that the premise "never really [took off]--at least […] I've never heard anyone refer to [the last seasons of the show] as 'the seasons when The X-Files mythology finally paid off.'" Handlen, however noted that "The Red and the Black" worked because "the performances are great as always, and because the second part of this two parter rarely feels bogged down or draggy." Robert Shearman and Lars Pearson, in their book Wanting to Believe: A Critical Guide to The X-Files, Millennium & The Lone Gunmen, rated the episode three stars out of five. The two called the episode a "typical mythology runaround" and noted that the plot was "complicated but the simpler scenes of confrontation are very well handled." Paula Vitaris from Cinefantastique gave the episode a positive review and awarded it three stars out of four. Vitaris praised the episode's premise and wrote that it represented "a second half of a two-parter that is as strong as the first half."

A variety of critics praised the hypnotism scene. Robert Shearman called the scene "gorgeous" and praised Gillian Anderson's acting abilities. Paula Vitaris was extremely impressed with the scene's blocking, calling the rendition "virtually orgasmic in intensity" and concluded that "Anderson is marvelous".

== Bibliography ==
- Hurwitz, Matt & Knowles, Chris (2008). The Complete X-Files: Behind the Series the Myths and the Movies. New York, US: Insight Editions. ISBN 978-1933784724.
- Meisler, Andy (1999), Resist or Serve: The Official Guide to The X-Files, Vol. 4, London: HarperCollins, ISBN 0-00-257133-1
- Shearman, Robert; Pearson, Lars (2009). Wanting to Believe: A Critical Guide to The X-Files, Millennium & The Lone Gunmen. Mad Norwegian Press. ISBN 978-0975944691.
