= The X-Files Mythology, Volume 3 – Colonization =

- Season 3
- Region 1 DVD cover
- No. of episodes: 16

Season chronology
- ← Previous; Volume 2 – Black Oil Next → Volume 4 – Super Soldiers

The X-Files Mythology – Volume 3 collection is the third DVD release containing selected episodes from the fifth to the eighth seasons of the American science fiction television series The X-Files. The episodes collected in the release form the middle of the series' mythology, and are centered on alien colonization efforts, the fall of the Syndicate, and Fox Mulder's (David Duchovny) abduction.

The collection contains three episodes from the fifth season, five from the sixth, six from the seventh, and two from the eighth. The episodes follow the investigations of paranormal-related cases, or X-Files, by FBI Special Agents Fox Mulder and Dana Scully (Gillian Anderson). Mulder is a believer in the paranormal, while the skeptical Scully has been assigned to debunk his work. Events covered in the episodes include the discovery of alien-human hybrid Cassandra Spender (Veronica Cartwright), the destruction of the Syndicate; the discovery of the remains of a spaceship in Africa; the fate of Mulder's sister, Samantha; and the abduction of the former, as well as the subsequent hunt for him under the direction of John Doggett (Robert Patrick).

The collection features the closure of several long-running arcs, as well as new introductions to the series' mythology. Series creator Chris Carter felt that the series' ongoing storylines were becoming too confusing, so he scrapped them and started over. Released on September 27, 2005, the collection generally received mixed to positive reviews from critics. William B. Davis, Mitch Pileggi, Nicholas Lea and Laurie Holden all play supporting roles in the collection.

== Plot summary ==
The show centers on FBI special agents Fox Mulder (David Duchovny) and Dana Scully (Gillian Anderson) who work on cases linked to the paranormal, called X-Files. Mulder is a former believer in the paranormal—having lost his belief in the fifth season opener "Redux", while the skeptical Scully has been assigned to debunk his work. As a rebel alien race secretly attacks several groups of former alien abductees, the agents meet Cassandra Spender (Veronica Cartwright), a woman who claims to be a multiple abductee and wants to deliver a positive message about aliens. Eventually, Mulder has Scully put under hypnosis to learn the truth about her abduction after Cassandra goes missing and her son, Jeffrey Spender (Chris Owens), angrily attempts to push his way up in the FBI. The Syndicate, meanwhile, quicken their tests for the black oil vaccine, sacrificing their own to do so. Later, the assassination of a chess grandmaster leads Mulder and Scully into an investigation that they soon discover strikes at the heart of the X-Files; they learn that the real target was a telepathic boy named Gibson Praise (Jeff Gulka).

In Washington, D.C., Mulder appears before an FBI panel regarding his experiences in Antarctica, but is later denied reassignment to the X-Files division: Mulder and Scully have been replaced by Spender and Diana Fowley (Mimi Rogers). Later, Skinner is mysteriously poisoned by a nanorobot infection. The culprit is revealed to be Alex Krycek (Nicholas Lea), a rogue FBI agent who formerly worked for the Syndicate, who continues to control the potentially debilitating nanotechnology in Skinner's system in order to achieve his goals. Mulder and Scully later learn of reports of rebel aliens burning doctors who were working on Cassandra. After finding her, she informs Mulder and Scully that the aliens are here to destroy all life on Earth and that she is a successful alien-human hybrid. The Smoking Man (William B. Davis) reveals everything to Diana Fowley, who agrees to help him and betray Mulder. Fowley forcibly takes Mulder, Cassandra, and Scully to a Centers for Disease Control facility at Fort Marlene. Meanwhile, the Syndicate rendezvous at a check point, preparing to be taken away by the Colonists, who are prepping for invasion. However, they are met by the alien rebels, who incinerate them all, including Cassandra—save The Smoking Man and Fowley, who escape. Jeffrey Spender is then purportedly killed by The Smoking Man.

Several months later, a metallic artifact with inscriptions is discovered on the beach of Côte d'Ivoire in Africa. After Mulder examines rubbings of the object, he falls into a dangerous coma. Hoping to find a cure for her partner, Scully rushes to Africa and discovers a massive wreck of a large spacecraft partially buried in the ocean. Skinner and Michael Kritschgau (John Finn) desperately attempt to find the truth behind the alien object. Unsuccessful, Scully returns from Africa to revisit Mulder, but instead she finds out that he has disappeared. She contacts Kritschgau and Skinner to find her partner. The Smoking Man has taken Mulder away to transplant the telepathic part of Mulder's brain into his own cranium, but the surgery is a failure.

While investigating a bizarre disappearance of a young girl from her home, Mulder soon discovers the truth about his sister's disappearance. It is revealed that his sister was taken by "walk-ins", benevolent spirit who save the souls of children doomed to live unhappy lives. Together, Mulder and Scully locate evidence that proves that Samantha was abducted by The Smoking Man, and was forced to live in a now-abandoned US Army base. Mulder eventually is reunited with the spirit of his sister, allowing him to finally let go. Mulder and Scully investigate a case of alien abduction which leads them back to Oregon, the site of their first case together. While investigating, Mulder is taken by a UFO. Scully soon meets Special Agent John Doggett (Robert Patrick), the leader of an FBI taskforce organized to conduct a search for Fox Mulder. Although the search ultimately proves unsuccessful, Doggett is assigned to the X-Files and works with Scully to look for explanations to several cases.

== Background ==
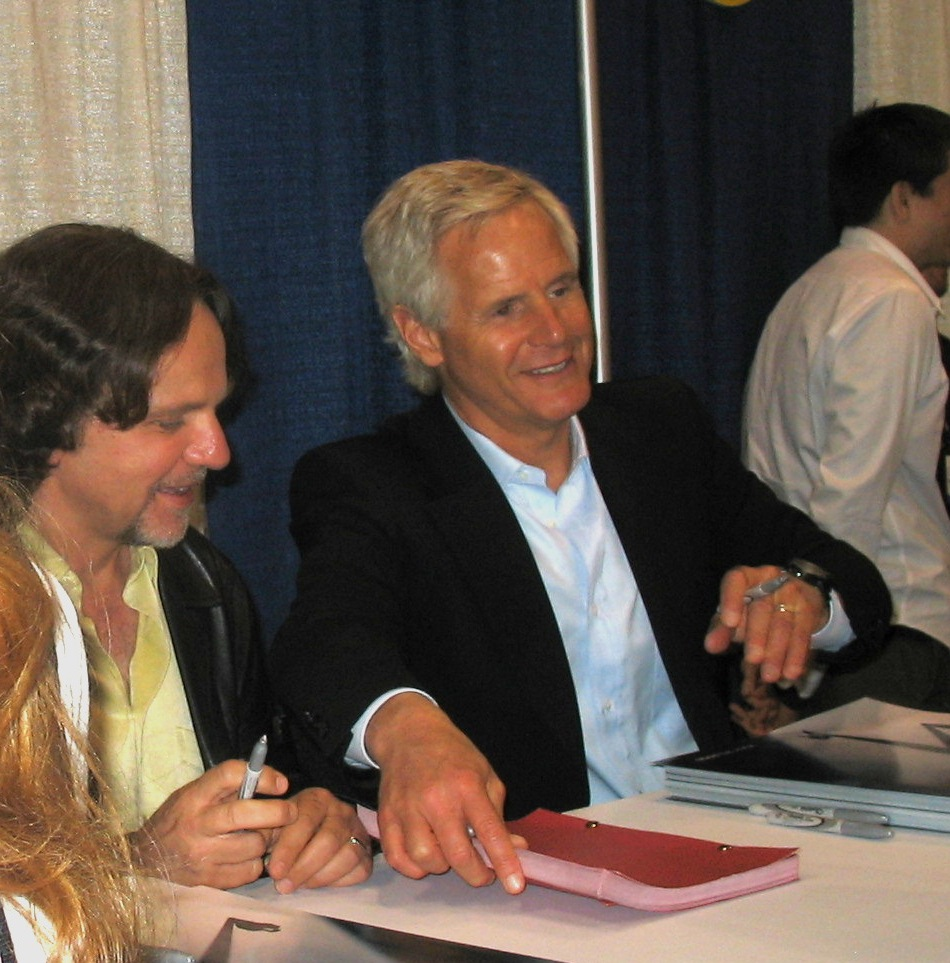
Spotnitz (left) and Carter (right), the main writers for the show's mythology episodes.

From the third season to the sixth season, the mysterious Syndicate was explored in detail. In the two part episode "Two Fathers"/"One Son", the Syndicate was destroyed. The plan to eliminate the Syndicate and relaunch the series' mythology in a new direction was originally conceived in September 1998. Director Kim Manners stated "I've said for years that the show really resolved itself, if you will, by accident. The whole storyline of the Syndicate and the bees and the aliens and the chips in the neck, they all seemed to just accidentally fall into place and create an intriguing, mysterious storyline that eventually got so mysterious and so intriguing that Chris had to blow it up, because he couldn't deal with it anymore."

The "Biogenesis"/"The Sixth Extinction"/"Amor Fati" trio of episodes started a new mythology for the series, questioning the origin of human life. Series creator Chris Carter claimed to be interested in the subject for a while, citing the possibility of extraterrestrial involvement in great extinctions that had happened millions of years ago. Carter claimed that early in the show he had met with a man who was one of the people responsible for leading the project of mapping the human genome and that he was interested enough in the subject to tie it into the show's alien mythology. The scientific basis for extraterrestrials pursued the writers to help Mulder an Scully's beliefs come together, which was furthered in the later seasons of the show. Frank Spotnitz claimed that the ideas used in this episode had been discussed between him and Carter for a few years, and had become easier to bring up after clearing away elements of the conspiracy in the episodes "Two Fathers" and "One Son".

"Closure" was written to create an end to Mulder's quest for his sister, Samantha, who had been abducted when he was a child. The idea to close the story arc received mixed reactions from various production and crew members. However, many of the show's producers realized that the time had come to answer one of the show's biggest questions. Spotnitz explained that, "I think [series star, David Duchovny] grew tired of playing the man who is missing his sister. [...] I told him, 'This is going to be the last time you're going to have to play [that part].'" Paul Rabwin noted that, "It's been seven years. I don't think any of us are going to miss Samantha Mulder. That device and motivation were very strong in the early years of the show. But as the years have gone by, the speculation kind of melted away."

"Requiem" was written as a way to potentially end the series. While filming was underway for the seventh season, many members of the crew felt that the show had entered into its final season. Executive producer Frank Spotnitz later explained, "There was a pretty strong sentiment inside and outside the show that it was time to call it a day." Eventually, it was decided that Mulder would be abducted at the end of the seventh season, leaving things open for the actor's return in 11 episodes the following year. They eventually replaced Duchovny's Mulder with Robert Patrick's John Doggett.

== Reception ==
Critical reception to the release ranged from mixed to positive. Monica S. Kuebler from Exclaim magazine noted that, while the set was "only for diehards, completists", the compilation was "the strongest of the mythology boxes thus far [released]". She went on to name the "Biogenesis"/"The Sixth Extinction"/"Amor Fati" arc the "best" of the set. Jeffrey Robinson from DVD Talk, was more critical, however. He wrote that, although the story was "interesting, intriguing, and entertaining", the selection of episodes "does not offer the same level of excitement" when compared to the previous two volumes. He concluded by commenting that there is "enough entertainment value for you to enjoy". Keith Uhlich from Slant Magazine awarded the box set three-and-a-half stars out of five. He commented on the conclusion of many of the show's long-running arcs, and noted that Mulder was often only a witness to these events, such as the destruction of the Syndicate and the death of his sister. Of the latter, Uhlich wrote that he "waver[s] back and forth on how emotionally effective it is". He did, however, award the image quality of the DVDs four stars out of five and refer to their presentation as "excellent".

== Episodes ==
No. in set	No. in series	Title	Directed by	Written by	Original release date	Prod. code
1	110	"Patient X"	Kim Manners	Chris Carter & Frank Spotnitz	March 1, 1998	5X13
Scully forms a bond with Cassandra Spender (Veronica Cartwright), a woman who claims to have been abducted by aliens. While Mulder's disbelief in the alien conspiracy is now questioned, he finds himself with more personal threats at the FBI.
2	111	"The Red and the Black"	Chris Carter	Chris Carter & Frank Spotnitz	March 8, 1998	5X14
With Cassandra Spender missing, and her son Jeffrey angrily attempting to push his way up in the FBI, Mulder has Scully put under hypnosis to learn the truth. The Syndicate, meanwhile, quicken their tests for the alien vaccine, sacrificing their own to do so.
3	117	"The End"	R. W. Goodwin	Chris Carter	May 17, 1998	5X20
Investigating the murder of a chess player, Mulder and Scully meet a boy who may be the embodiment of everything in the X-Files.
4	118	"The Beginning"	Kim Manners	Chris Carter	November 8, 1998	6ABX01
With the X-Files reopened, Mulder and Scully eagerly hunt for a deadly creature in the Arizona desert. What they find seems to support Mulder's revived belief in aliens, but is discredited when the agents are not reassigned to the X-Files, with Jeffrey Spender (Chris Owens) and Diana Fowley (Mimi Rogers) taking over instead.
5	126	"S.R. 819"	Daniel Sackheim	John Shiban	January 26, 1999	6ABX09
Assistant Director Walter Skinner (Mitch Pileggi) is poisoned. Mulder and Scully have 24 hours to save him, but in order to do so, they must determine who wants him dead, and why.
6	128	"Two Fathers"	Kim Manners	Chris Carter & Frank Spotnitz	February 7, 1999	6ABX11
When Cassandra Spender is returned, Mulder, Scully and Agent Spender find themselves facing the exposure of the conspiracy involving extraterrestrials, while the worried Syndicate take evasive measures.
7	129	"One Son"	Rob Bowman	Chris Carter & Frank Spotnitz	February 14, 1999	6ABX12
An alien rebellion leads the Syndicate to its demise as their twenty-five-year conspiracy approaches its disastrous collapse.
8	139	"Biogenesis"	Rob Bowman	Chris Carter & Frank Spotnitz	May 16, 1999	6ABX22
Mulder believes that metallic objects discovered in Africa are proof that life originated elsewhere in the universe.
9	140	"The Sixth Extinction"	Kim Manners	Chris Carter	November 7, 1999	7ABX01
While Scully tries to piece together the meaning of the symbols on the spaceship beached in Africa, Mulder is imprisoned by his own frenetic brain activity.
10	141	"The Sixth Extinction II: Amor Fati"	Michael W. Watkins	David Duchovny & Chris Carter	November 14, 1999	7ABX02
Returning to Washington to find Mulder gone, Scully joins Michael Kritschgau (John Finn) and Skinner – who is still being forced into betrayal by Alex Krycek (Nicholas Lea) – to find her partner. However, the Cigarette Smoking Man (William B. Davis) has taken Mulder to a place where all his problems are gone—or so it seems. And Diana Fowley is forced to make a choice about her loyalties.
11	149	"Sein und Zeit"	Kim Manners	Chris Carter & Frank Spotnitz	February 6, 2000	7ABX10
While investigating the bizarre disappearance of a young girl from her home, Mulder becomes obsessed with the number of children who have vanished in similar ways. Scully's fears that he is emotionally involved due to his sister's disappearance 27 years earlier are heightened when Mulder's mother dies, apparently of suicide.
12	150	"Closure"	Kim Manners	Chris Carter & Frank Spotnitz	February 13, 2000	7ABX11
After years of believing that his sister was abducted by aliens, Mulder finally learns the long-sought-after answers to her true fate with the help of a police psychic.
13	154	"En Ami"	Rob Bowman	William B. Davis	March 19, 2000	7ABX15
The Cigarette Smoking Man offers to show Scully the cure for cancer if she travels with him – and hides her trip from Mulder.
14	161	"Requiem"	Kim Manners	Chris Carter	May 21, 2000	7ABX22
Ignoring warnings to reduce their budget, Mulder and Scully research reports of alien abductions in Bellefleur, Oregon – the site of their first joint X-Files investigation.
15	162	"Within"	Kim Manners	Chris Carter	November 5, 2000	8ABX01
Newly promoted Deputy Director Alvin Kersh (James Pickens Jr.) assigns pragmatic Agent John Doggett to head up the task force searching for Mulder. Meanwhile, an increasingly defiant Skinner assists Scully as they search for the alien ship, which is systematically removing evidence of alien existence, and is next headed to the deserts of Arizona, and Gibson Praise.
16	163	"Without"	Kim Manners	Chris Carter	November 12, 2000	8ABX02
At a remote school in the Arizona desert, Doggett, Scully, Gibson and Skinner – as well as a host of students and agents – don't know whom to trust as the bounty hunter works among them and – in a spaceship close by – Mulder is tested on.

== Special features ==
The X-Files Mythology, Volume 3 – Colonization
Set Details		Special Features	
16 Episodes; 4-Disc Set; 1.78:1 Aspect Ratio; Subtitles: English; English (Dolby Digital 5.1 Surround)		Audio Commentaries (Dolby Digital 2.0 Stereo); "Patient X" – Kim Manners; "The Red and the Black" – Chris Carter; "Two Fathers" – Manners; "One Son" – Frank Spotnitz; "Closure" – Manners; "Within" – Manners & Robert Patrick; Threads of Mythology; Mythology Timeline	
Release Dates
United States; Canada	Australia	Japan	United Kingdom
September 27, 2005	TBA	TBA	TBA
