= Patient X =

Patient X may refer to:

- Patient X (film), a 2009 Filipino horror film
- "Patient X" (The X-Files), an episode from the American science fiction series The X-Files
