= The X-Files season 4 =

Season of television series

The X-Files
- Season 4
- DVD cover
- Starring: David Duchovny; Gillian Anderson
- No. of episodes: 24

Release
- Original network: Fox
- Original release: October 4, 1996 – May 18, 1997

Season chronology
- ← Previous; Season 3 Next → Season 5

The fourth season of the American science fiction television series The X-Files commenced airing on the Fox network in the United States on October 4, 1996, concluding on the same channel on May 18, 1997, and contained 24 episodes. Following the filming and airing of the season, production began on The X-Files feature film, which was released in 1998 following the show's fifth season.

The fourth season of the series focuses heavily on FBI federal agents Fox Mulder's (David Duchovny) and his partner Dana Scully's (Gillian Anderson) investigation of an alien conspiracy, which is protected by the mysterious Syndicate. Midway through the season, Scully is diagnosed with terminal cancer, a result of her previous abduction, and Mulder begins to lose his faith in the idea of extraterrestrials. Debuting with high viewing figures and ranking as the twentieth most watched television series during the 1996–97 television year in the United States, the season was a success, with figures averaging around 20 million viewers an episode. This made it, at the time, the highest rated season of The X-Files to air. The season's twelfth episode, "Leonard Betts", was chosen as the Fox lead-out program following Super Bowl XXXI, and was viewed by 29.1 million viewers, making it the highest-rated episode in the series' run. Critical reception from television critics was mostly positive.

== Plot overview ==
The show centers on FBI special agents Fox Mulder (David Duchovny) and Dana Scully (Gillian Anderson), who work on cases linked to the paranormal called X-Files. When the Syndicate suspect that one of their members is passing information to Mulder and Scully, they organize a canary trap to find the leak, using information about the safety of Mulder's mother as bait. X's (Steven Williams) role as an informant is discovered, and he is shot dead, although he is able to pass along the name of another informant who can be of use to Mulder—Marita Covarrubias (Laurie Holden), the Special Representative to the Secretary-General of the United Nations. Covarrubias' aid is sought when Mulder attempts to reach Tunguska in Russia to investigate the source of a further black oil contamination. Whilst there, Mulder is held in a gulag and used as a successful test subject for a black oil vaccine. He escapes and is able to return to America, having found that Alex Krycek (Nicholas Lea) is working with the Russians.

Having been diagnosed with cancer, Scully is unsure of her future with the FBI. Mulder is convinced that her condition is a result of her earlier abduction ("Ascension"), and is prepared to make a deal with the Syndicate to find a cure. He is dissuaded by Walter Skinner (Mitch Pileggi), who secretly makes such a deal instead. While being pursued by an assassin responsible for a hoax alien corpse discovered on a mountaintop, Mulder fakes his own suicide, mutilating the assassin's face to provide a decoy body. He uses the distraction this offers to infiltrate The Pentagon to find a cure for Scully's cancer, while Scully is able to uncover and reveal a Syndicate connection within the FBI.

== Production ==
=== Writing ===
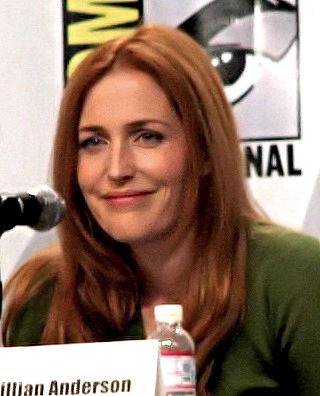
The writers for The X-Files decided to give Gillian Anderson's character cancer in season four.

The season saw drastic changes to the series' alien mythology. In the premiere episode, "Herrenvolk", Williams—the actor who played Mulder's informant X—was written out of the show. He said that, "Carter called me up personally [and said] 'Got good news, got bad news. The good news is we're gonna bring you up for another episode this week. The bad news is you're gonna take a bullet." The writers created a new character, Marita Covarrubias, to function as Mulder's informant. Carter felt it would be "more interesting for Mulder's next contact to be a woman", noting that he "wanted there to be some suspicion about whether Mulder would become involved with her romantically. "Herrenvolk" also introduced the killer bees, who would go on to play a larger part in the 1998 film. Carter described the fourth season as "maybe the most intense and difficult season of the show."

The season is notable in that it introduced a story arc about Scully developing terminal cancer, which would not be resolved until the beginning of the fifth season. The show's producers decided to give Gillian Anderson's character Dana Scully cancer early in the season. Carter initially discussed giving Scully's mother cancer but decided to have Scully suffer from it instead. Carter felt the move would give the show an interesting platform on which to discuss things such as faith, science, health care and a certain element of the paranormal. Some of the writing staff felt that the decision was a poor one to make, citing it as "a cheap TV thing". However, Frank Spotnitz felt that, given the appearances of cancer-stricken abductees in previous episodes, it was an "obligatory" move to have Scully follow suit.

Following the cancellation of the Fox television series Space: Above and Beyond, Carter called the series' creators Glen Morgan and Wong—who had previously been writers for the first two seasons of The X-Files—and asked if they wanted to rejoin the series. Morgan told Carter that the two of them would rejoin, but only for four episodes, and only if they could use members from the cast of Space: Above and Beyond, so that "the world can finally see them". Carter accepted this condition, and the two dutifully provided four of the seasons episodes.

=== Filming ===
The season finale, "Gethsemane", was notable in that an entire set created to emulate icy caverns was constructed inside a warehouse which had previously been used for cold storage; and required the use of truckloads of lumber and 10,000 square feet (930 m^{2}) of Styrofoam. The set would become one of the most expensive and elaborate built during the series' history. The set required a constant temperature of −21 °F (−29 °C) in order to maintain the real snow and ice used to decorate it. This refrigeration allowed the actors' breath to visibly fog up, and allowed the cast to "have a place that feels real" to aid their acting. The outdoor scenes for the episode were filmed around Vancouver's Mount Seymour, with weather conditions making shooting difficult enough to require an extra day of work.

Although the series' 1998 movie would take place after the events of the fifth season, the movie was actually filmed in the hiatus between the show's fourth and fifth season and re-shoots were conducted during the filming of the show's fifth season.

=== Crew ===
Series creator Chris Carter also served as executive producer and showrunner and wrote eight episodes. Howard Gordon continued as executive producer and wrote five episodes for his final season on the series. Spotnitz was promoted to co-producer and wrote seven episodes. Vince Gilligan was promoted to co-producer and wrote five episodes. Former X-Files writers Glen Morgan and James Wong returned after a one-season absence from the series as consulting producers and wrote three episodes together, with Morgan writing an additional episode solo that Wong directed. John Shiban was promoted to story editor and wrote four episodes. David Greenwalt joined mid-season as co-executive producer and wrote one episode for his only season on the series. Writing team Valerie and Vivian Mayhew wrote one freelance episode. Executive producer and frequent series director R. W. Goodwin wrote his first and only episode for the series. Other producers included producer Joseph Patrick Finn, co-producer Paul Rabwin, and consulting producer Ken Horton, who joined the series with this season.

Producing-directors for the show included Rob Bowman and Kim Manners, who directed the bulk of the episodes for the season. Manners directed eight episodes, while Bowman directed seven. Executive producer R. W. Goodwin again directed the season premiere and finale. James Charleston directed three episodes, while Tucker Gates, Michael Lange, Cliff Bole, and series writer James Wong each directed one episode.

== Cast ==
=== Main cast ===
==== Starring ====
- David Duchovny as Special Agent Fox Mulder (Note: Duchovny does not appear in "Musings of a Cigarette Smoking Man".)
- Gillian Anderson as Special Agent Dana Scully (Note: Anderson does not appear in "Zero Sum", and only appears in archival footage in "Musings of a Cigarette Smoking Man".)

==== Also starring ====
- Mitch Pileggi as Assistant Director Walter Skinner
- William B. Davis as Cigarette Smoking Man

=== Recurring cast ===
- Laurie Holden as Marita Covarrubias
- Brendan Beiser as Pendrell
- Tom Braidwood as Melvin Frohike
- Rebecca Toolan as Teena Mulder
- Morris Panych as Grey-Haired Man

=== Guest cast ===
- Don S. Williams as First Elder
- Dean Aylesworth as Young Bill Mulder
- Scott Bellis as Max Fenig
- Bruce Harwood as John Fitzgerald Byers
- Dean Haglund as Richard Langly
- Sheila Larken as Margaret Scully
- Nicholas Lea as Alex Krycek
- Greg Michaels as Scott Garrett
- John Neville as Well-Manicured Man
- Chris Owens as Young Cigarette Smoking Man
- Charles Cioffi as Scott Blevins
- John Finn as Michael Kritschgau
- Jerry Hardin as Deep Throat
- Steve Makaj as Scott Ostelhoff
- John Moore as Third Elder
- Pat Skipper as Bill Scully
- Roy Thinnes as Jeremiah Smith
- Brian Thompson as Alien Bounty Hunter
- Arnie Walters as Father McCue
- Steven Williams as X

== Episodes ==
Episodes marked with a double dagger (‡) are episodes in the Mythology of The X-Files Alien story arc. (Note: Many of the episodes were included in the DVD collection The X-Files Mythology, Volume 2 – Black Oil, released by Fox.)

No. overall	No. in season	Title	Directed by	Written by	Original release date	Prod. code	U.S. viewers (millions)
74	1	"Herrenvolk"‡	R. W. Goodwin	Chris Carter	October 4, 1996	4X01	21.11
Pursued by an Alien Bounty Hunter, Jeremiah Smith takes Mulder to a farm where he finds several girls who are clones of his sister.
75	2	"Home"	Kim Manners	Glen Morgan & James Wong	October 11, 1996	4X03	18.85
In a small, otherwise peaceful town, the agents investigate the death of an infant with disturbing birth defects, and the trail leads to a clan of inbred, genetic mutants.
76	3	"Teliko"	James Charleston	Howard Gordon	October 18, 1996	4X04	18.01
Mulder and Scully are called in to investigate the unexplained deaths of several African and African-American people whose skin color has turned white as the result of either a rare medical disorder or a bizarre curse.
77	4	"Unruhe"	Rob Bowman	Vince Gilligan	October 27, 1996	4X02	19.10
Agents Mulder and Scully investigate a group of bizarre kidnappings in which the only clues are inexplicable photographs. But when Scully is the next intended victim, Mulder must get into the killer's head.
78	5	"The Field Where I Died"	Rob Bowman	Glen Morgan & James Wong	November 3, 1996	4X05	19.85
FBI Agent Mulder's search for an informant inside a cult compound leads Scully and him to one of the cult leader's wives. What they soon discover is an unexpectedly close connection with the woman.
79	6	"Sanguinarium"	Kim Manners	Valerie Mayhew & Vivian Mayhew	November 10, 1996	4X06	18.85
Bizarre homicides in a hospital's plastic surgery unit lead Mulder and Scully to suspect a supernatural force may be responsible.
80	7	"Musings of a Cigarette Smoking Man"‡	James Wong	Glen Morgan	November 17, 1996	4X07	17.09
Mulder, Scully and Byers meet with Frohike, where he details what may have been Cigarette Smoking Man's real life.
81	8	"Tunguska"‡	Kim Manners	Frank Spotnitz & Chris Carter	November 24, 1996	4X09	18.85
A diplomatic courier carrying deadly cargo involves Agents Mulder and Scully in a dangerous web of intrigue, which leads Mulder on a trip to Russia.
82	9	"Terma"‡	Rob Bowman	Frank Spotnitz & Chris Carter	December 1, 1996	4X10	17.34
Scully and Skinner attend a suspicious Senate hearing, while Mulder and Krycek face off in a Russian gulag.
83	10	"Paper Hearts"	Rob Bowman	Vince Gilligan	December 15, 1996	4X08	16.59
Agent Mulder is haunted by an old case in which young girls were killed and hearts cut from their nightgowns. Soon Mulder becomes suspicious when the killer taunts him with the idea that one of his victims may have been Samantha.
84	11	"El Mundo Gira"	Tucker Gates	John Shiban	January 12, 1997	4X11	22.37
Deadly rain in a migrant workers camp sends Agent Mulder and Scully on the trail of a mythical beast—El Chupacabra.
85	12	"Leonard Betts"	Kim Manners	Vince Gilligan & John Shiban & Frank Spotnitz	January 26, 1997	4X14	29.15
The disappearance of a man's body from a hospital morgue leads Mulder and Scully to investigate the strange circumstances surrounding the man's death. However, for Scully it will lead to a horrifying revelation.
86	13	"Never Again"	Rob Bowman	Glen Morgan & James Wong	February 2, 1997	4X13	21.36
On a solo assignment out of town, Scully meets a man whose tattoo does not want to share him—especially not with Scully.
87	14	"Memento Mori"‡	Rob Bowman	Chris Carter & Vince Gilligan & John Shiban & Frank Spotnitz	February 9, 1997	4X15	19.10
Fear for Scully's health sends Mulder to investigate the bizarre circumstances that may explain her mysterious abduction two years ago, while Scully takes a more practical course to quell her illness.
88	15	"Kaddish"	Kim Manners	Howard Gordon	February 16, 1997	4X12	16.56
A homicide in a Jewish community leads to the deaths of the killers, forcing Mulder and Scully to determine whether vengeance or larger forces are at work.
89	16	"Unrequited"	Michael Lange	Story by : Howard Gordon; Teleplay by : Howard Gordon & Chris Carter	February 23, 1997	4X16	16.56
The mysterious assassination of a high-ranking military official has Mulder and Scully racing against the clock to stop a seemingly unstoppable—and invisible—assassin.
90	17	"Tempus Fugit"‡	Rob Bowman	Chris Carter & Frank Spotnitz	March 16, 1997	4X17	18.85
While celebrating Scully's birthday, Mulder learns of Max Fenig's death in a plane crash. What the agents soon discover is that the circumstances surrounding the crash may have been alien.
91	18	"Max"‡	Kim Manners	Chris Carter & Frank Spotnitz	March 23, 1997	4X18	18.34
The investigation continues for agents Mulder and Scully of the apparent downing of Flight 549 by a UFO. They encounter deadly opposition from the military, which continues to cover up the truth of incident.
92	19	"Synchrony"	James Charleston	Howard Gordon & David Greenwalt	April 13, 1997	4X19	18.09
Mulder and Scully investigate a homicide for which the suspect presents an incredible alibi — that the death was foretold by an old man able to see into the future.
93	20	"Small Potatoes"	Cliff Bole	Vince Gilligan	April 20, 1997	4X20	20.86
A small town is "blessed" by babies being born with tails. Mulder and Scully arrive only to encounter a suspect who proves nearly impossible to identify.
94	21	"Zero Sum"‡	Kim Manners	Howard Gordon & Frank Spotnitz	April 27, 1997	4X21	18.60
Agent Mulder launches a criminal investigation into a bizarre death which he finds has connections to A.D. Skinner. Meanwhile, Skinner makes his own deal with the devil in a desperate attempt to save Scully from the cancer that is taking over her body.
95	22	"Elegy"	James Charleston	John Shiban	May 4, 1997	4X22	17.10
Mulder and Scully track a series of homicides that lead to a home for the mentally ill and a clue that makes no sense: each victim being connected to a purported warning from the dead. However, while Mulder makes some surprising discoveries, Scully is reminded of her own mortality.
96	23	"Demons"‡	Kim Manners	R. W. Goodwin	May 11, 1997	4X23	19.10
Scully is concerned for Mulder's well-being when he suffers from a memory loss while investigating a case — and is the only suspect in a brutal double homicide.
97	24	"Gethsemane"‡	R. W. Goodwin	Chris Carter	May 18, 1997	4X24	19.85
Researchers in northern Canada discover what may finally be irrefutable proof of alien existence, Mulder believes in the discovery but an FBI syndicate assassin tries to kill Scully then tries to convince Mulder that alien existence is a cover though sinister agents begin to kill to prevent its revelation, leading to a shocking conclusion.

== Reception ==
=== Ratings ===
The fourth season of The X-Files debuted with "Herrenvolk" on October 4, 1996. This episode earned a Nielsen rating of 13.2, with a 23 share, meaning that roughly 13.2 percent of all television-equipped households, and 23 percent of households watching television, were tuned in to the episode. The episode was viewed by 21.11 million people, a marked increase from the third season's finale, "Talitha Cumi", which was viewed by 17.86 million viewers. "Herrenvolk" was, at the time, the highest-rated episode of The X-Files to air, as well as the first episode of the series to be watched by over 20 million viewers. As the season continued, however, ratings began to drop slightly, stabilizing around approximately less than 20 million viewers-per-episode. The season hit a high with its twelfth episode, "Leonard Betts", which had been chosen as the Fox lead-out program following Super Bowl XXXI. The episode was viewed by 29.1 million viewers, making it the highest-rated episode in the series' run. The season hit a low with the fifteenth and sixteenth episodes, "Kaddish" and "Unrequited", respectively, which were both viewed by 16.56 million viewers. The season finale, "Gethsemane", earned a Nielsen rating of 13.2, with a 19 share, and was viewed by 19.85 million viewers, marking a 5.9 percent drop in viewers when compared to the season premiere, (Note: "Gethsemane" was viewed by 19.85 million viewers whereas "Herrenvolk" was viewed by 21.11 million viewers. Subtracting the two figures and then dividing them by 21.11 million, which represents the largest possible audience, yields a percent decrease of 5.9 percent.) but a 10 percent increase in viewers when compared to the previous season finale. (Note: "Gethsemane" was viewed by 19.85 million viewers whereas "Talitha Cumi" was viewed by 17.86 million viewers. Subtracting the two figures and then dividing them by 19.85 million, which represents the largest possible audience, yields a percent increase of 10 percent.) The season ranked as the twelfth most watched television series during the 1996–97 year, with an average of 19.2 million viewers, making it, at the time, the highest-rated season of The X-Files to air.

=== Reviews ===
The fourth season of The X-Files received largely positive reviews from television critics, although several critics noted that the season was not as good as its predecessors. The Contra Costa Times noted that The X-Files during its fourth year was creatively good and "always fascinating even when it's frustrating." Rick Kushman Bee of the Sacramento Bee wrote that Fox' Sunday block of The Simpsons, King of the Hill and The X-Files was televisions "real 'Must See TV'". Matt Roush of USA Today wrote that the fourth season was not the series' best year, but "when good, [The X-Files is] still shockingly great". Zack Handlen of The A.V. Club gave an overall positive review of the season and wrote that many of the episodes dabbled in existentialism. However, he also contended that many of the mythology episodes—especially the season finale—began to have "a ring of familiarity to" them and that "the repetition is getting old".

Episodic reviews were diverse. Some episodes were praised. Robert Shearman and Lars Pearson, in their book Wanting to Believe: A Critical Guide to The X-Files, Millennium & The Lone Gunmen, rated the episodes "Home", "Unruhe", "Musings of a Cigarette Smoking Man", "Paper Hearts", and "Small Potatoes" five stars out of five. Paula Vitaris of Cinefantastique also awarded "Musings of a Cigarette Smoking Man", "Paper Hearts", and "Small Potatoes" perfect scores of four out of four. Tom Kessenich named "Memento Mori" the fourth best episode of the series, writing that it was the definitive example of Mulder and Scully's devotion for each other.". He also wrote highly of "Home", "Paper Hearts", Small Potatoes", and "Never Again", ranking them as the fifth, eleventh, sixteenth, and twenty-fourth best episodes of The X-Files, respectively. Other episodes were derided. Shearman and Pearson called "El Mundo Gira" an "aching unambitious take on Latin American culture" and "rubbish". Vitaris summaried "Unrequited" as a "slight story that collapses under the weight of its message".

"Gethsemane" created intense media speculation about whether or not Mulder was actually dead. An article in the Wall Street Journal discussed fan theories behind Mulder's madness while a cartoon ran in The New Yorker a few weeks later surrounding Mulder's "death". Series creator Chris Carter noted that "the whole plot line of 'Gethsemane' revolved around a hoax, but there are actually huge revelations in this show. And it's an amazing thing that we could get people to believe that Mulder could actually kill himself because his belief system was stolen from him". UGO Networks listed the episode at number 21 in a countdown of "TV's Best Season Finales", noting that it "rocked the core of the series' entire mythology".

In 2018 and 2019, in a ranking of all eleven seasons, the fourth season received critical acclaim and was named the second-best season by both Consequence of Sound and Screen Rant. The episode, "Memento Mori", was singled out as one of the best episodes of the series by Screen Rant.

=== Accolades ===
The fourth season earned the series twelve Primetime Emmy Award nominations, with three wins. Anderson won for Outstanding Lead Actress in a Drama Series, after being nominated the previous year. The episodes "Memento Mori" and "Tempus Fugit" won for Outstanding Art Direction for a Series and Outstanding Sound Editing for a Series, respectively. Notable nominations included its third consecutive nomination for Outstanding Drama Series, Duchovny's first nomination for Outstanding Lead Actor in a Drama Series, James Wong nominated for Outstanding Directing for a Drama Series for "Musings of a Cigarette Smoking Man", and Carter, Gilligan, Shiban, and Spotnitz being nominated for Outstanding Writing for a Drama Series for "Memento Mori". Other nominations were Jim Gross and Heather MacDougall each being nominated for Outstanding Editing for a Series – Single Camera Production for the episodes "Tempus Fugit" and "Terma", respectively; Outstanding Makeup for a Series for "Leonard Betts"; Outstanding Sound Mixing for a Drama Series for "Tempus Fugit"; and Mark Snow being nominated for Outstanding Music Composition for a Series (Dramatic Underscore) for "Paper Hearts". The series also won its second Golden Globe Award for Best Television Series – Drama, while Gillian Anderson and David Duchovny won in the television series drama acting categories.

== DVD release ==
The X-Files – The Complete Fourth Season
Set details	Special features
24 episodes; 7-disc set; 1.33:1 aspect ratio; Subtitles: English, Spanish; English (Dolby Digital 2.0 Surround)	"The Truth About Season Four" Documentary; Interviews on specific episodes; "Herrenvolk" and "Tunguska" – Chris Carter; "Unruhe" and "Paper Hearts" – Vince Gilligan; "Home" – James Wong; Audio Commentaries (Dolby Digital 2.0 Stereo); "Memento Mori" – Frank Spotnitz; "Small Potatoes" – Vince Gilligan; 8 special effects clips; 9 deleted scenes; 13 "Behind the Truth" F/X spots
Release dates
Region 1	Region 2
November 13, 2001	April 22, 2002

== Bibliography ==
- Kessenich, Tom (2002). Examination: An Unauthorized Look at Seasons 6–9 of the X-Files. Trafford Publishing. ISBN 1-55369-812-6.
- Lowry, Brian (1996). Trust No One: The Official Guide to the X-Files. Harper Prism. ISBN 0-06-105353-8.
- Meisler, Andy (1998). I Want to Believe: The Official Guide to the X-Files Volume 3. Harper Prism. ISBN 0-06-105386-4.
- Meisler, Andy (1999). Resist or Serve: The Official Guide to The X-Files, Vol. 4. London: HarperCollins. ISBN 0-00-257133-1.
