= Gethsemane (The X-Files) =

- The X-Files episode
- Episode no.: Season 4 Episode 24
- Directed by: R. W. Goodwin
- Written by: Chris Carter
- Production code: 4X24
- Original air date: May 18, 1997
- Running time: 44 minutes

Guest appearances
- Charles Cioffi as Scott Blevins; Sheila Larken as Margaret Scully; Pat Skipper as Bill Scully; Matthew Walker as Arlinsky; James Sutorius as Babcock; John Finn as Michael Kritschgau; Steve Makaj as Scott Ostelhoff; John Oliver as Rolston; Nancy Kerr as Agent Hedin; Barry W. Levy as Vitagliano; Arnie Walters as Father McCue; Rob Freeman as Detective Rempulski; Craig Brunanski as Saw Operator

Episode chronology
← Previous "Demons"	Next → "Redux"
- The X-Files season 4

"Gethsemane" is the twenty-fourth and final episode of the fourth season of the American science fiction television series The X-Files. It premiered on the Fox network on May 18, 1997. It was directed by R.W. Goodwin, and written by series creator Chris Carter. "Gethsemane" featured guest appearances by Charles Cioffi, Sheila Larken and Pat Skipper, and introduced John Finn as recurring character Michael Kritschgau. The episode helped to explore the overarching mythology, or fictional history of The X-Files. "Gethsemane" continued the series' black oil mythology, following the earlier episodes "Piper Maru", "Apocrypha", "Tunguska", "Terma", and "Zero Sum". "Gethsemane" earned a Nielsen household rating of 13.2, being watched by 19.85 million people in its initial broadcast.

The show centers on FBI special agents Fox Mulder (David Duchovny) and Dana Scully (Gillian Anderson) who work on cases linked to the paranormal, called X-Files. In the episode, Mulder is shown evidence of alien life which may actually be part of a huge government hoax designed to deflect attention from secret military programs. Meanwhile, Scully struggles with her cancer in the face of hostility from her brother, who believes she should no longer be working.

"Gethsemane" was filmed on one of the series' most elaborate and costly sets, replicating an icy mountaintop inside a refrigerated building using real snow and ice. Shooting for exterior scenes took place on Vancouver's Mount Seymour, occurring just a week before Duchovny's wedding. The episode, which has been described by Carter as pondering "the existence of God", has received mixed responses from critics, with its cliffhanger ending frequently being cited as its main failing.

== Plot ==
The episode opens in medias res to police investigating a dead body in the apartment of FBI agent Fox Mulder (David Duchovny). Dana Scully (Gillian Anderson) confirms the unseen body's identity and leaves. She subsequently appears before an FBI panel led by Section Chief Scott Blevins (Charles Cioffi), reviewing her work with Mulder on the X-Files.

In Canada's Saint Elias Mountains, a frozen extraterrestrial body is discovered by an expedition team. Professor Arlinsky, the team's leader, sends ice core samples containing presumably alien DNA to Mulder. Scully has the samples tested and confirms the DNA's non-terrestrial origin, but is attacked by a man who steals the samples. Scully learns that her attacker is Michael Kritschgau (John Finn), a Defense Department employee. When she tracks down Kritschgau and holds him at gunpoint, he reveals that he might be killed.

Meanwhile, Arlinsky returns to the mountains with Mulder, but they find that most of the expedition members have been shot dead. The sole survivor is a man named Babcock, who reveals that he has saved the alien corpse from theft by burying it. Together, the three men bring the corpse to the United States. There, Mulder and Arlinsky perform an autopsy on the corpse, believing it belongs to a genuine extraterrestrial. After Mulder leaves to meet with Scully, a mysterious assassin, Scott Ostelhoff, arrives and kills both Babcock and Arlinsky.

Scully introduces Mulder to Kritschgau, who claims that everything Mulder thinks he knows about aliens is a lie. He tells him that his sister's abduction was fabricated, that all evidence of alien biology are merely scientific anomalies, and that the alien body he has just examined was fake. Kritschgau claims that the entire alien mythos is a hoax perpetrated by the U.S. government as a cover for the activities of the military–industrial complex. Mulder dismisses these claims.

Mulder finds Arlinsky and Babcock dead, with the alien body missing. Scully tells him Kritschgau told her that she was given cancer to make him believe. Mulder, distraught, sits in his apartment watching a conference about extraterrestrial life on television. The narrative returns to the present, where Scully reveals to the panel that Mulder died the previous night of an apparent self-inflicted gunshot wound to the head.

== Production ==
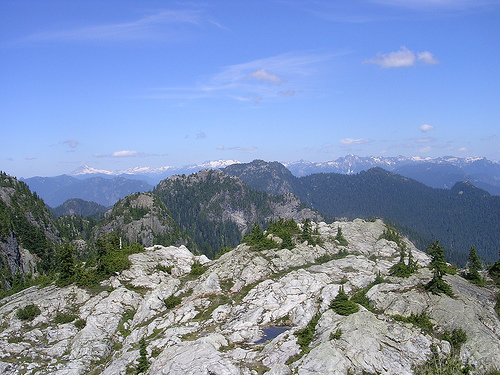
Exterior shots in the episode were filmed on Vancouver's Mount Seymour.

The icy caverns featured in the episode were constructed inside a warehouse which had previously been used for cold storage, and required the use of truckloads of lumber and 10,000 square feet (930 m^{2}) of Styrofoam. The set would become one of the most expensive and elaborate built during the series' history. It required a constant temperature of −21 °F (−29 °C) in order to maintain the real snow and ice used to decorate it. This refrigeration allowed the actors' breath to visibly fog up, as well as the cast to "have a place that feels real" to aid their acting.

The outdoor scenes were filmed around Vancouver's Mount Seymour, with weather conditions making shooting difficult enough to require an extra day of work. The episode's production took place just a week before David Duchovny's wedding, with his fiancée Téa Leoni visiting the set during filming. The first cut of the episode was twelve minutes too long, resulting in some of the scenes in the mountains being removed. Series creator Chris Carter re-edited the entire episode two days before it aired.

Carter has described "Gethsemane" as a "big ideas episode", noting that its main concern is debating "the existence of God". The title of the episode is an allusion to the biblical garden of Gethsemane where Jesus was betrayed by Judas Iscariot. The character Michael Kritschgau was named after a former drama teacher of Gillian Anderson. The tagline for this episode is "Believe the lie", changed from the usual "The truth is out there". This episode marks the first appearance of one of Scully's brothers since a flashback in the season two episode "One Breath". Section Chief Scott Blevins makes his first appearance since the fourth episode of the first season, "Conduit".

== Reception ==
"As far back as Deep Throat, Mulder was asked why he stubbornly clung to his beliefs in the wake of so much proof to the contrary, and he answered it was because such proof was never convincing enough. Nor is it here."

— Robert Shearman, on the episode's transparency.

=== Ratings ===
"Gethsemane" premiered on the Fox network on May 18, 1997. The episode earned a Nielsen household rating of 12.7 with a 19 share, meaning that roughly 12.7 percent of all television-equipped households, and 19 percent of households watching television, were tuned in to the episode. A total of 19.85 million viewers watched this episode during its original airing.

=== Reviews ===
"Gethsemane" received mixed to positive reviews from critics. Lon Grahnke of Chicago Sun-Times reacted positively toward the episode, calling it a "stunning" season finale. Paula Vitaris, writing for Cinefantastique, rated "Gethsemane" two stars out of four, noting that it "withholds so much information that it barely qualifies as a complete episode". Vitaris felt that the large degree of ambiguity in the episode's script left the actors' performances "curiously neutral", adding that the cast "struggle manfully" with the material. Writing for The A.V. Club, Zack Handlen rated the episode a B+, noting that "everything here has a ring of familiarity to it". Handlen felt that the episode's premise and ending were poorly executed, as "trying to balance possible truths while maintaining the plausibility of both is incredibly difficult to pull off on a long-running show", adding that the episode "comes down on the only side of the fence it really could" given that "there've been too many scenes of shape-changing bounty hunters and mystical alien healers to really let this idea play out know [sic] in any real way". Robert Shearman, in his book Wanting to Believe: A Critical Guide to The X-Files, Millennium & The Lone Gunmen, rated the episode four stars out of five, noting that while it "attempts to do too much", it "has a passion behind it which makes it gripping". Shearman felt that the episode's cliffhanger ending, centering on the apparent death of Mulder, was too unbelievable, noting that it would be out of character for him to grow so disillusioned as to take his own life. In the 1999 FX Thanksgiving Marathon, containing fan-selected episodes, "Gethsemane" (along with "Redux" and "Redux II") was presented as the "Best Mythology Episode".

The episode created speculation about whether or not Mulder was actually dead. An article in the Wall Street Journal discussed fan theories behind Mulder's madness while a cartoon ran in The New Yorker a few weeks later surrounding Mulder's "death". Series creator Chris Carter noted that "the whole plot line of 'Gethsemane' revolved around a hoax, but there are actually huge revelations in this show. And it's an amazing thing that we could get people to believe that Mulder could actually kill himself because his belief system was stolen from him". UGO Networks listed the episode at number 21 in a countdown of "TV's Best Season Finales", noting that it "rocked the core of the series' entire mythology". Den of Geek's John Moore felt that the episode was "one of the finest season-enders" of the series, noting that it "ended by completely pulling the carpet out from under the fans". Moore listed the character of Michael Kritschgau as the seventh-best villain of the series, adding that he shook "what we knew about the show to its core" by "provid[ing] nourishment to a seed of doubt that had been playing on Mulder's mind for the entire season".

== Bibliography ==
- Meisler, Andy (1998). I Want to Believe: The Official Guide to the X-Files Volume 3. Harper Prism. ISBN 0061053864.
- Shearman, Robert (2009). Wanting to Believe: A Critical Guide to The X-Files, Millennium & The Lone Gunmen. Mad Norwegian Press. ISBN 978-0975944691.
