= X (The X-Files) =

Fictional character in The X-Files

- The X-Files character
- First appearance: "The Host"
- Last appearance: "The Truth"
- Created by: Chris Carter
- Portrayed by: Steven Williams; Natalija Nogulich (deleted scenes)

In-universe information
- Gender: Male
- Occupation: Unknown
- Affiliated with: Men in Black; Federal Bureau of Investigation, The X-Files
- Duration: 1994–1996, 2002

X, sometimes referred to as Mr. X, is a fictional character on the American science fiction television series The X-Files. He serves as an informant, leaking information to FBI Special Agents Fox Mulder and Dana Scully to aid their investigation of paranormal cases, dubbed X-Files. The character serves as a replacement for Deep Throat, who had been killed off in the first season finale, "The Erlenmeyer Flask". X himself would be killed off after appearing in several seasons, eventually being replaced by Marita Covarrubias.

X is portrayed in the series by Steven Williams, and made his debut in the second season episode "The Host", although the character would not appear on-screen until "Sleepless", two episodes later. The role had originally been conceived as female, with Natalija Nogulich cast in the role; however, her initial scenes were deemed unsatisfactory by the producers, leading to her replacement. Williams' portrayal of X was intended to introduce a personality completely different from the character's predecessor, Deep Throat, and was positively received by critics and fans.

== Conceptual history ==
The character of X was originally intended to be a woman, and Natalija Nogulich had been cast in the role. However, Nogulich was replaced by Steven Williams after shooting her first scene, as the writing staff felt Nogulich was not able to create the "right chemistry" with her co-stars. Williams had previous experience with writers Glen Morgan and James Wong, although it was series creator Chris Carter who suggested him for the part.

Williams' portrayal of the role was intended to act as a counterpoint to Jerry Hardin's portrayal of X's predecessor, Deep Throat. Whereas Deep Throat had been a selfless character, X was written and performed as a scared, selfish character. Prior to the episode "One Breath", Glen Morgan had felt that the character of X was not "going over too well" with fans of the series, as he seemed to simply be a copy of Deep Throat. Believing Williams to be an actor worth having as a series regular, he included in the episode a scene in which X murders witnesses who have seen him speaking to Fox Mulder. Morgan felt that such a scene reflected X's paranoia and the difference between him and his predecessor, noting that "Deep Throat was a guy willing to lose his life for letting out the secret, whereas X is a guy who's still scared". Williams has stated that he has never attempted to rationalize the character's motives or imagine a backstory for him, preferring to play the role with as little background as possible; he once stated "the less I know about him, the more interesting he becomes."

Williams' background in fight choreography, stemming from his role in Missing in Action 2: The Beginning (1985), allowed him to prepare for, and to help create, the character's action scenes, including choreographing the character's brawl with Mitch Pileggi's character Walter Skinner in the episode "End Game". Williams has also stated that his portrayal of the role is based in part on Avery Brooks' character Hawk on the series Spenser: For Hire.

== Character arc ==
X was introduced on the series via a phone call made to Fox Mulder (David Duchovny) in the second season episode "The Host", telling Mulder that he had "a friend in the FBI". However, the character did not appear on-screen until "Sleepless", two episodes later, aiding Mulder in an investigation by leaking information on a secret military project from the Vietnam War. While X's loyalties and his own agenda were often unclear, he proved more than once that he at least does not want Mulder dead. In the episode "End Game", he is approached by Dana Scully (Gillian Anderson), who pleads that she needs to know where Mulder is, believing his life to be in danger. Initially X refuses, and is subsequently confronted by Walter Skinner (Mitch Pileggi), who seemed to recognize X. He relinquishes Mulder's location, though not until after a brief but intense scuffle with Skinner. In the episode "731", X's loyalty to Mulder is further confirmed. Trapped on a train car equipped with a time bomb, Mulder, about to escape, is attacked brutally by the Red Haired Man, a Men in Black assassin. X fatally shoots the Red Haired Man as he is about to step off the car, then boards the car with only enough time left to save either Mulder or the alien-human hybrid the car was transporting. He opts to save Mulder, and carries him off to safety just as the car explodes.

In the season 4 opener "Herrenvolk", X's position as an informant is discovered by the Syndicate. When suspicion arises after the finding of photographs that were taken of The Smoking Man (William B. Davis) by X, false information is planted at the First Elder's behest, in order to root out the leak. Attempting to relay the information to Mulder, X goes to his apartment and is surprised by fellow Men in Black operative, the Gray Haired Man, who fatally shoots him. With his last strength, X crawls to Mulder's doorstep and writes in his own blood "SRSG", meaning "Special Representative to the Secretary General" of the United Nations, and thus, this clue leads Mulder to Marita Covarrubias (Laurie Holden). After his death, X appears two more times—in The Lone Gunmen origin story "Unusual Suspects," set before his death, and as a ghost in the season 9 finale, "The Truth".

== Reception ==
If Deep Throat was a cheat code to the quest for truth, X is a [sic] walkthrough written by somebody who doesn't want to share his secrets, doesn't like you, and might not even be playing the same game.

— The A.V. Club's Zack Handlen on the series' informants.

The character of X has been well-received by critics. Entertainment Weekly included the character in the list of the top 20 Black Sci-Fi Icons in 2009, at number 17. Emily VanDerWerff, writing for The A.V. Club, has praised the "gravitas" of Williams' acting, adding that she wished that the writers "had figured out a way to have him around more often than they did". VanDerWerff's fellow writer Zack Handlen felt that the character's assassination in "Herrenvolk" was "appropriately shocking", calling the scene "one of the most memorable deaths in the series", although he felt that the immediate introduction of the character's successor, Marita Covarrubias, "deflates the importance of X's loss" in the episode. Handlen has also called X "the best of Mulder's informants", explaining that this is "because he's always pissed off, he's always reluctant to provide information, and you can't ever be sure what play he's really running". Series writer Frank Spotnitz has called X "the meanest, nastiest, most lethal killer on the planet".

Steven Williams has noted that he feels the episodes "Nisei" and "731" were chiefly responsible for the character's popularity with fans. In 1997, Williams was nominated for a Screen Actors Guild Award for Outstanding Performance by an Ensemble in a Drama Series for his work as X, alongside Gillian Anderson, William B. Davis, David Duchovny and Mitch Pileggi.
