= Marita Covarrubias =

Fictional character from the X-Files

- The X-Files character
- Covarrubias addressing a meeting of the Syndicate
- First appearance: "Herrenvolk"
- Last appearance: "The Truth"
- Created by: Chris Carter
- Portrayed by: Laurie Holden

In-universe information
- Gender: Female
- Occupation: Assistant to the Special Representative to the Secretary-General of the United Nations
- Affiliated with: United Nations; The Syndicate; Alex Krycek; The X-Files
- Duration: 1996-2000, 2002
- Appearances: "Herrenvolk" "Teliko" "Tunguska" "Unrequited" "Zero Sum" "Patient X" "The Red and the Black" "One Son" "Requiem" "The Truth"

Marita Covarrubias is a fictional character on the American science fiction television series The X-Files. She was initially introduced as an informant, leaking diplomatic information to FBI Special Agent Fox Mulder to aid his investigation of paranormal cases, dubbed X-Files. However, she was revealed to be an agent of the secretive Syndicate, although ultimately betraying that organization on several occasions. Introduced in the fourth season opener "Herrenvolk", the character remained a recurring presence until the series' finale, "The Truth".

The character of Marita Covarrubias was portrayed by Laurie Holden in all her appearances. She was introduced as a replacement for Steven Williams' character X, after the latter was killed by a Syndicate assassin. The character has received mixed criticism, being compared unfavorably to similar characters from the series.

== Conceptual history ==
The X-Files' creator Chris Carter felt it would be "more interesting for Mulder's next contact to be a woman", noting that he "wanted there to be some suspicion about whether Mulder would become involved with her romantically. X, the character who had previously filled Covarrubias' role as an informant in the series, had originally been cast as a female character. However Natalija Nogulich, the actress cast in that role, was replaced by Steven Williams after shooting her first scene.

When auditioning for the role of Marita Covarrubias, Laurie Holden was not allowed access to an episode script, instead simply being told that her character worked for the United Nations and had an air of "intelligent seriousness". The actress had never seen the series before she auditioned for the part, and was required to audition using only three pages of scripted material from what would be her debut episode. Holden was required to learn Russian for the episode "Patient X", and commented that roughly fifteen seconds of screen-time took hours to rehearse. The voice coach responsible for instructing Holden and Nicholas Lea in their Russian dialogue tested their proficiency by asking them to speak to Russian-speaking friends of his over the telephone. Holden felt that the two-part episode "Two Fathers" and "One Son" offered her "cold, emotionless, private" character a chance to come across as "vulnerable, exposed and raw".

== Character arc ==
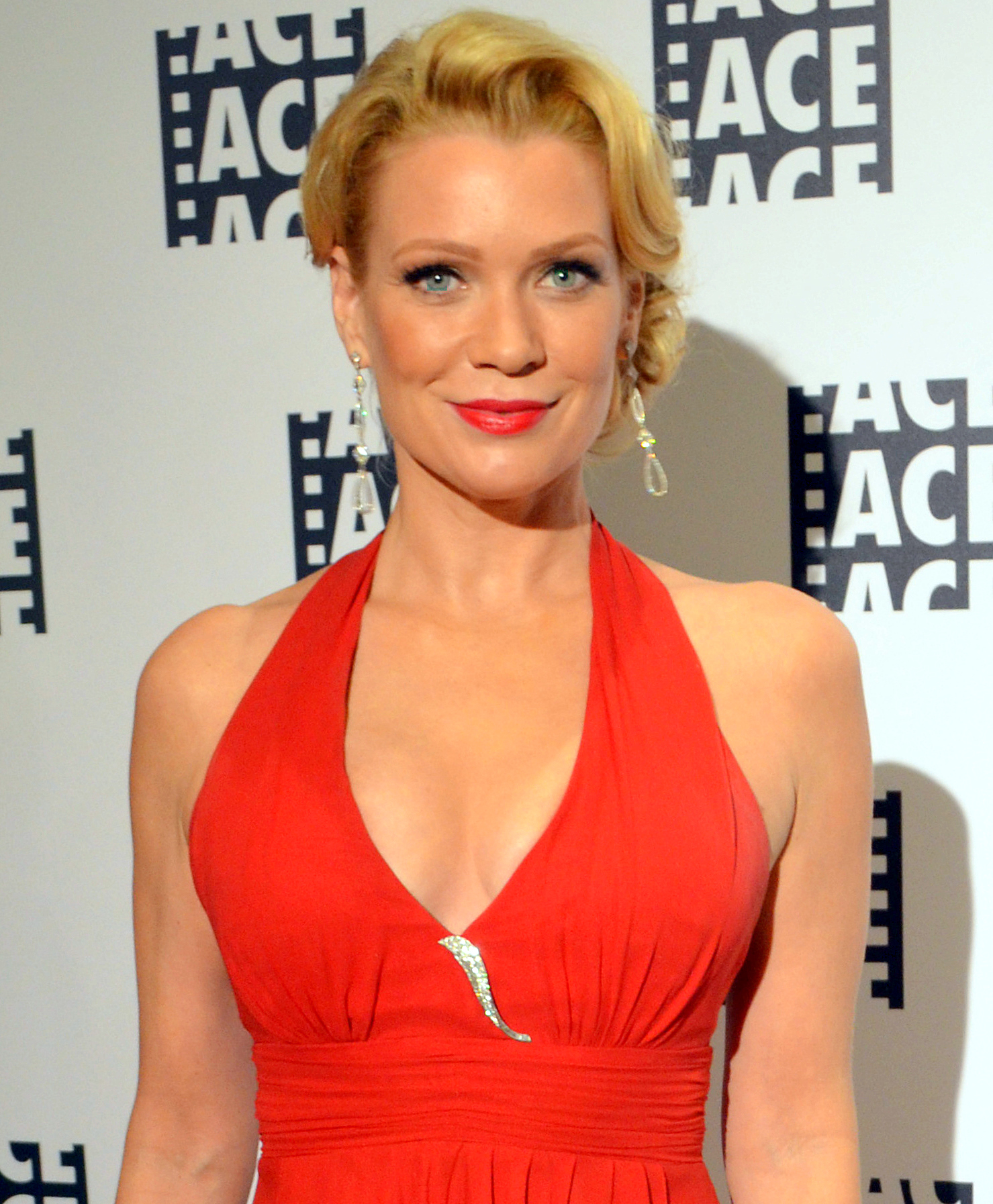
Laurie Holden portrayed Covarrubias in all of the character's appearances.

Marita Covarrubias is introduced as an informant to Fox Mulder (David Duchovny) after the death of his former source, X (Steven Williams). X scrawls the letters "SRSG" in his own blood as he dies, leading Mulder to the Special Representative to the Secretary-General of the United Nations, where he meets his new contact, the SRSG's assistant, Covarrubias; she uses her diplomatic connections to help Mulder infiltrate the Russian province of Krasnoyarsk, allowing him to reach the site of the Tunguska event. However, it is later seen that Covarrubias is working for The Smoking Man (William B. Davis) and the Syndicate.

During the fifth season, the Syndicate discovered that Covarrubias had betrayed them and was providing information to Mulder. Covarrubias was infected with black oil during her betrayal of the Syndicate, and Syndicate scientists used her to test a vaccine they had been working to create. While the Syndicate-developed vaccine proves ineffective, Covarrubias' infection is ultimately cured by an effective vaccine stolen from a Russian shadow-government group by Alex Krycek (Nicholas Lea).

In the following season, Mulder and Scully, alongside Cassandra Spender, are apprehended by a CDC quarantine team and sent to a decontamination centre, where Covarrubias makes her presence known to Mulder, and describes having been used as a test subject for the Syndicate's vaccine. Later, Covarrubias is discovered by FBI agent Jeffrey Spender (Chris Owens) when looking for his mother. Knowing she is being abandoned at the facility as everyone related to the Syndicate's research is departing, she begs him to help her escape the facility, addressing him by name as well as giving him information about the whereabouts of his mother, Cassandra. Spender's credentials to leave with a patient are not recognised; Alex Krycek, a former Syndicate agent now acting alone, is also present at the facility, and discovers the rebels have taken the alien embryo. Krycek declines to help them, and leaves Covarrubias for dead.

Covarrubias returns in the seventh season finale "Requiem", restored to health. She makes contact with Krycek at the behest of The Smoking Man, who wishes to resume the work of the now-eradicated Syndicate. Having been given the location of a downed UFO, she and Krycek betray The Smoking Man, instead going to FBI assistant director Walter Skinner and Mulder to inform them about the craft. They later turn on The Smoking Man, pushing him down a flight of stairs and leaving him for dead.

In the series finale "The Truth", Skinner seeks Covarrubias as a witness in Mulder's trial for murder. After Skinner fails to track her down, the ghost of X hands Mulder a scrap of paper with her new address on it. She is called upon to testify, and speaks about her involvement with the Syndicate to some extent. However, when pressed for further information about the continuation of the conspiracy she clams up, and at Mulder's request is dismissed from the stand for fear that if she divulges certain knowledge, she would be killed.

== Reception ==
The character of Marita Covarrubias has been met with generally negative criticism. Robert Shearman and Lars Pearson, in their book Wanting to Believe: A Critical Guide to The X-Files, Millennium & The Lone Gunmen, felt that the character was "used so perfunctorily since her introduction" that her appearances added little to the episodes she featured in, describing her as a "bad parody" of the earlier characters Deep Throat and X. Debra Warlick, writing for Cinefantastique, felt that Holden's acting in "One Son" was "heart breaking [sic]", but found that she had "unfortunately" been used simply to convey a plot point to other characters. Also writing for Cinefantastique, Paula Vitaris noted that Covarrubias "is a problematic character", adding that "she never breaks out of her function as a plot device". Zack Handlen, writing for The A.V. Club, felt that Covarrubias's introduction in "Herrenvolk" was ill-timed, noting that it "deflates the importance" of X's death in the episode.

Writer Frank Spotnitz has described Covarrubias, along with Alex Krycek, as "young, attractive, vital [and] dangerous" compared to the other, older, characters working for the Syndicate. Holden has compared the character to Mata Hari, adding that "you can't really read what she's saying or what her intentions are". During the initial broadcast run of the series, fans referred to Covarrubias as "UNblonde", a reference to her United Nations posting and her dyed hair.

== Footnotes ==
=== References ===
- Edwards, Ted (1996). X-Files Confidential. Little, Brown and Company. ISBN 0316218081.
- Fraga, Erica (2010). LAX-Files: Behind the Scenes with the Los Angeles Cast and Crew. CreateSpace. ISBN 9781451503418.
- Meisler, Andy (1998). I Want to Believe: The Official Guide to the X-Files Volume 3. Harper Prism. ISBN 0061053864.
- Meisler, Andy (1999). Resist or Serve: The Official Guide to the X-Files Volume 4. Harper Prism. ISBN 0061073091.
- Meisler, Andy (2000). The End and the Beginning: The Official Guide to the X-Files Volume 5. Harper Prism. ISBN 0061075957.
- Shearman, Robert; Pearson, Lars (2009). Wanting to Believe: A Critical Guide to The X-Files, Millennium & The Lone Gunmen. Mad Norwegian Press. ISBN 978-0975944691.
