= Zero Sum (The X-Files) =

- The X-Files episode
- Episode no.: Season 4 Episode 21
- Directed by: Kim Manners
- Written by: Frank Spotnitz; Howard Gordon
- Production code: 4X21
- Original air date: April 27, 1997
- Running time: 44 minutes

Guest appearances
- Mitch Pileggi as Walter Skinner; William B. Davis as Cigarette Smoking Man; Laurie Holden as Marita Covarrubias; Don S. Williams as First Elder; John Moore as Third Elder; Morris Panych as Gray-Haired Man; Nicolle Nattrass as Misty Nagata; Paul McLean as Special Agent Kautz; Fred Keating as Detective Ray Thomas; Allan Gray as Dr. Peter Valdespino; Addison Ridge as Bespectacled Boy; Lisa Stewart as Jane Brody; Barry Greene as E.R. Doctor; Christopher J. Newton as Photo Technician; Oscar Goncalves as Night Attendant; Jason Anthony Griffith as Uniformed Officer; Julia Body as Supervisor

Episode chronology
← Previous "Small Potatoes"	Next → "Elegy"
- The X-Files season 4

"Zero Sum" is the twenty-first episode of the fourth season of the American science fiction television series The X-Files. It premiered on the Fox network on April 27, 1997. It was directed by Kim Manners, and written by Frank Spotnitz and Howard Gordon. "Zero Sum" included appearances by William B. Davis, Laurie Holden and Morris Panych. The episode helped to explore the overarching mythology, or fictional history of The X-Files. "Zero Sum" earned a Nielsen household rating of 11.7, being watched by 18.6 million people in its initial broadcast. The episode has received mixed to positive responses from critics. "Zero Sum" continued the series' black oil mythology, following earlier episodes "Piper Maru", "Apocrypha", "Tunguska", and "Terma".

The show centers on FBI special agents Fox Mulder (David Duchovny) and Dana Scully (Gillian Anderson) who work on cases linked to the paranormal, called X-Files. In this episode, a case Mulder is asked to investigate is covered up by the agents' boss Walter Skinner (Mitch Pileggi), who has made a sinister bargain with The Smoking Man (Davis).

The decision to center another episode around Skinner—following the third season episode "Avatar"—was made when Gillian Anderson took a week off to shoot the film The Mighty. Rather than have Duchovny carry the additional workload, the writing staff decided to focus the episode on supporting cast members. "Zero Sum" was the final appearance in the series by Morris Panych. In addition, the episode saw the return of the virus-carrying bees from the season-opener "Herrenvolk" and would later return in the 1998 feature film.

== Plot ==
At a postal routing center in Desmond, Virginia, a woman is killed by a swarm of bees in the bathroom while taking a cigarette break. Assistant Director Walter Skinner (Mitch Pileggi), working for The Smoking Man (William B. Davis), covers up the death by deleting the file on the case from agent Fox Mulder's (David Duchovny) computer, cleaning up all the evidence at the scene, burning the woman's body in an incinerator and replacing the police's blood sample for the case by impersonating Mulder. As he leaves the police station, Skinner is chased down by Detective Ray Thomas, who believes he is Mulder. Skinner tells him there is nothing on the case warranting his involvement, and leaves.

Shortly after Skinner arrives home he is met by Mulder, who tells him about the case and the fact that someone is going to great lengths to cover it up. Mulder reveals that Detective Thomas was killed, which shocks Skinner. Mulder tells Skinner that Scully is undergoing tests regarding her cancer. Later that night Skinner meets with The Smoking Man, who is accompanied by Thomas' murderer, the Gray Haired Man (Morris Panych). Skinner is angry that Thomas was killed and wants to end their arrangement, which The Smoking Man refuses to allow. Mulder calls Skinner, telling him about the woman's body being burned and the blood evidence being tampered with. Mulder tells Skinner that he is trying to match the bullet that killed Thomas to a gun issued to a federal agent or local officer. Skinner searches his drawer and realizes that his gun was missing and must have been the one used for the murder. Skinner, realizing he has been set up, calls The Smoking Man, who confirms that Thomas was killed with Skinner's gun and that by going to the police Skinner would end up implicating himself in the murder. The Smoking Man refuses to provide any details on what he is covering up.

Skinner returns to the routing center where he tears a hole in the bathroom wall and finds a large honeycomb of dead bees. He visits an entomologist to look at one of the bees and is told that Mulder visited him six months ago about a similar subject. Skinner finds Mulder's file on the matter, copying down the contact information for Marita Covarrubias (Laurie Holden). Mulder tells Skinner that a bank near the police station took a picture of the detective, which shows him with Skinner, but the picture is too obscured for Mulder to identify him. Skinner calls Covarrubias, who does not have any evidence to provide him at this time. The entomologist is killed by a swarm of bees. The next day, Mulder and Skinner look at his body, which is infected with smallpox transmitted by the bees. Skinner visits the co-worker of the postal worker who died, who tells him she was pressured to not say anything about what happened by men who demanded a damaged package. At the photo lab Mulder analyzes the photo, which reveals Skinner's identity.

The Smoking Man meets with the Syndicate, who are responsible for the bees. Soon afterward a swarm of bees attacks a school in Peyson, South Carolina, and one of the teachers and several of the students die. Skinner heads to the hospital, where he is met by Covarrubias. She demands to know what he knows about the matter. He tells her he believes that the bees are being used as a carrier for some sort of experiment. Skinner returns home where he is confronted by Mulder, who now suspects that Skinner has been working against him all this time. Skinner is able to convince Mulder that he would not have forced his own drawer lock open and hence could not have been the murderer. Convinced of Skinner's evidence, Mulder turns in the gun with the serial number filed off so Skinner is not blamed for the murder. That night Skinner confronts The Smoking Man in his apartment, angry that nothing has been done for Scully. The Smoking Man convinces him that Scully will die if he kills him and Skinner leaves without killing him, but not before firing warning shots. Shortly afterwards Covarrubias calls The Smoking Man, who tells her to tell Mulder what he wants to hear while an unknown man is shown behind her listening on another phone.

== Production ==
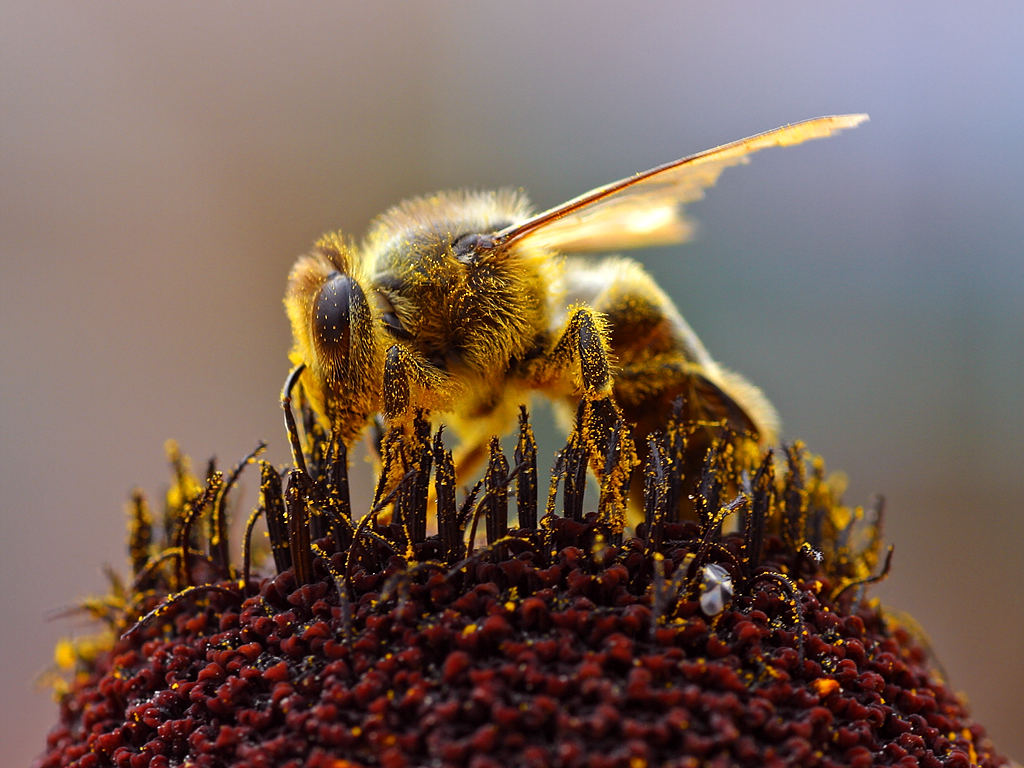
"Zero Sum" brought back the virus-carrying bees from "Herrenvolk"; they would also appear in 1998's The X-Files.

Co-writer Frank Spotnitz described the episode as a "fortunate accident". Late in the fourth season of the show Gillian Anderson left the show for a week to film her part in the film The Mighty. The producers, knowing that they would have to write an episode without Dana Scully, decided it was not fair to have David Duchovny carry the same workload as in a normal episode considering her absence. As such, a story was devised in which his involvement would be light. This resulted in the decision to write, for the second year in a row, an episode focused on Assistant Director Walter Skinner (Mitch Pileggi). Howard Gordon, having written the previous Skinner-centric episode, "Avatar", joined Spotnitz and the two wrote the episode over a weekend while another Gordon-written episode, "Synchrony", was in production. The writers felt that this was the perfect time to bring in Skinner's deal with The Smoking Man (William B. Davis) to cure Scully's cancer, made in the episode "Memento Mori". Frank Spotnitz said of Skinner's deal, "The hard thing for Skinner was that we had to keep him in the middle. We had him tell Mulder not to bargain with The Smoking Man in order to save Scully's life. And then he himself struck a Faustian bargain with the Cigarette Smoking Man and was in his debt for some kind."

The writing staff felt that "Zero Sum" was a logical place to bring back the bees that were used in the season premiere, "Herrenvolk", feeling it was important to not have something paranormal happen to Skinner in this episode considering that had been done in the previous season. Live bees were used for filming, but showed up poorly in the footage; visual effects technician Laurie Kallsen-George then spent nine days digitally enhancing the footage to improve upon this. The virus-carrying bees would later form a central plot point in the series' 1998 feature film adaptation.

Director Kim Manners noted that the episode "was a really good show for me, because I had not got a chance to work with Mitch. And they wrote a great script, you know? It was really something he could sink his teeth into and he just did a great job. Bill Davis was fabulous in that show too". This was the second episode of the series to not feature Scully, the first being the second season episode "3". Guest actor Morris Panych, portraying the Syndicate assassin The Grey-Haired Man, makes his last appearance in the series in this episode. Panych had previously appeared in "Piper Maru", "Avatar", "Herrenvolk" and "Memento Mori".

== Broadcast and reception ==
"Zero Sum" premiered on the Fox network on April 27, 1997. The episode earned a Nielsen household rating of 11.7 with a 17 share, meaning that roughly 11.7 percent of all television-equipped households, and 17 percent of households watching television, were tuned in to the episode. A total of 18.6 million viewers watched this episode during its original airing.

The episode has received mixed to positive responses from critics. Zack Handlen, writing for The A.V. Club, rated the episode an A, calling it "utterly bad-ass". Handlen felt that the episode effectively toyed with the series' usual narrative structure, making lead character Fox Mulder seem "nearly as much of an antagonist" as The Smoking Man; Handlen also felt that "Zero Sum" gave significant insight into the character of Walter Skinner. Paula Vitaris, writing for Cinefantastique, rated "Zero Sum" one-and-a-half stars out of four, noting that its "pacing and tone are off". Vitaris felt that "Duchovny and Pileggi give good performances", despite Pileggi seeming "unintentionally comic" at times; though she noted that "an episode without Scully feels pretty empty". Robert Shearman, in his book Wanting to Believe: A Critical Guide to The X-Files, Millennium & The Lone Gunmen, rated the episode four stars out of five, noting that "Pileggi looks much more comfortable here than he did in last year's showcase ['Avatar']". Shearman felt that the episode's attempts to tie into the wider storylines—the appearance of Marita Covarrubias in particular—are where it "really stumbles", stating that its success lies "in the shock value of seeing a deliberately familiar story through the fractured view of another character".

== Bibliography ==
- Lowry, Brian (1996). Trust No One: The Official Guide to the X-Files. Harper Prism. ISBN 0061053538.
- Hurwitz, Matt; Knowles, Chris (2008). The Complete X-Files. Insight Editions. ISBN 978-1933784809.
- Meisler, Andy (1998). I Want to Believe: The Official Guide to the X-Files Volume 3. Harper Prism. ISBN 0061053864.
- Shearman, Robert (2009). Wanting to Believe: A Critical Guide to The X-Files, Millennium & The Lone Gunmen. Mad Norwegian Press. ISBN 978-0975944691.
