= Herrenvolk (The X-Files) =

- The X-Files episode
- X naming Fox Mulder's next informant. The death of X was called "shocking" by one reviewer.
- Episode no.: Season 4 Episode 1
- Directed by: R. W. Goodwin
- Written by: Chris Carter
- Production code: 4X01
- Original air date: October 4, 1996
- Running time: 44 minutes

Guest appearances
- Mitch Pileggi as Walter Skinner; William B. Davis as The Smoking Man; Roy Thinnes as Jeremiah Smith; Brian Thompson as Alien bounty hunter; Steven Williams as X; Laurie Holden as Marita Covarrubias; Rebecca Toolan as Teena Mulder; Vanessa Morley as Samantha Mulder; Don S. Williams as First Elder; Morris Panych as Gray-Haired Man; Brendan Beiser as Pendrell; Michael David Sims as Senior Agent; Ken Camroux as Second Senior Agent; Casey Murphy as Young Blond Boy; Sean Murphy as Young Blond Boy; Garvin Cross as Repairman; Liza Huget as Nurse

Episode chronology
← Previous "Talitha Cumi"	Next → "Home"
- The X-Files season 4

"Herrenvolk" is the fourth season premiere of the American science fiction television series The X-Files. It premiered on the Fox network on October 4, 1996. It was directed by R.W. Goodwin, and written by series creator Chris Carter. "Herrenvolk" featured guest appearances by Roy Thinnes and Brian Thompson, and introduced Laurie Holden as recurring character Marita Covarrubias. The episode helped to explore the overarching mythology, or fictional history of The X-Files. "Herrenvolk" earned a Nielsen household rating of 13.2, being watched by 21.11 million people in its initial broadcast.

FBI special agent Fox Mulder (David Duchovny) is shown more evidence of his sister's abduction by the mysterious Jeremiah Smith (Thinnes) and makes a desperate attempt to rescue her, whilst being pursued by the Alien Bounty Hunter. Mulder's informant X is found out by those he has betrayed—with fatal consequences. "Herrenvolk" is the second part of a two-part episode, continuing the plot from the third season finale, "Talitha Cumi".

"Herrenvolk" saw the death of Steven Williams' character X, and featured another appearance of Mulder's sister Samantha, a character described by Carter as the "lifeblood" of the series, who last appeared in the second season double episode, "Colony" and "End Game". The episode featured scenes filmed using swarms of bees, which caused problems due to the difficulty of taming and directing the animals. Other special effects in the episode were achieved through motion control photography.

== Plot ==
In rural Alberta, Canada, a telephone lineman is stung by a bee as he works at the top of a pole. Five identical boys approach and watch as the lineman adversely reacts to the sting, causing him to fall to the ground and die. The boys look down at his body, then walk off silently.

At a remote industrial site, Fox Mulder (David Duchovny), Dana Scully (Gillian Anderson) and Jeremiah Smith (Roy Thinnes) are approached by the Alien Bounty Hunter (Brian Thompson). Mulder and Smith flee with both Scully and the Bounty Hunter in pursuit, eventually reaching a waterfront. Mulder sneaks up on the Bounty Hunter and stabs him in the neck with the alien stiletto. Both he and Jeremiah escape on a boat, leaving Scully alone with the seemingly dead Bounty Hunter. When she approaches the body, the Bounty Hunter wakes up and chokes her, demanding to know where Mulder and Smith are heading. He releases her after realizing she has no such knowledge.

On the boat, Mulder and Smith debate whether they should save Mulder's mother Teena, despite the risk of Men in Black awaiting them. Mulder ultimately agrees that it would be too dangerous to visit her. Instead, they head towards Canada in a stolen car, where Smith says Mulder will find his sister, Samantha. Meanwhile, the First Elder (Don S. Williams) meets with The Smoking Man (William B. Davis) in Teena's hospital room, confronting him with photos of his prior meeting with her, taken by X (Steven Williams). They realize that there is a leak, and plan to smoke out its source by releasing false information about Teena being in danger.

The Bounty Hunter learns of Mulder's whereabouts by listening in on a phone call between him and a captive Scully, leaving her to pursue him and Smith while Scully informs Mulder that the Bounty Hunter is still after them. In Washington, Scully reports to Walter Skinner (Mitch Pileggi), who informs her that the other Jeremiah Smiths have all disappeared. Scully and Agent Pendrell investigate the data that the Smiths were compiling, trying to decipher the encrypted files. Scully contacts X, who tells her that it is related to the government's long-running smallpox eradication program. X also tells her that he believes Teena's life is in danger.

Meanwhile, in Canada, Smith and Mulder's car runs out of gas. Walking the last few miles on foot, they come across the body of the electrician, grossly decomposed and covered in ants. Smith takes Mulder to a mysterious field where they find a group of identical children; the girls all resemble Samantha at the age when she was abducted. Smith tells Mulder that the cloned children are drones, workers used to tend the fields, incapable of speaking. After retrieving a gasoline can, Mulder tries to take one of the female clones with him, against Smith's wishes. However, the Bounty Hunter arrives and chases them. As he corners them in a large bee hive, the Bounty Hunter is crushed and stung repeatedly in a trap set up by the trio.

Scully and Pendrell report to Skinner and the Office of Professional Responsibility on the data being tracked by the Smiths, which appears to be a cataloging of human beings. Meanwhile, the Bounty Hunter catches up to Mulder, Smith and the clone, plowing into their car with a van. After knocking Mulder unconscious, the Bounty Hunter pursues a fleeing Smith. Mulder returns to the hospital to see Teena, resigned to the fact that he cannot save her. The Syndicate leads X to a trap at Mulder's apartment, where he is shot by the Grey-Haired Man. X crawls into the apartment and writes the letters "SRSG" in his blood before dying.

The letters lead Mulder to Marita Covarrubias (Laurie Holden), the assistant to the Special Representative of the Secretary General of the United Nations. Covarrubias tells Mulder that the fields in Canada have been abandoned but shows him a picture of the drone children tending to the shrubs. At the hospital, the Smoking Man directs the Bounty Hunter to heal Teena, telling him that the fiercest enemy is the one with nothing to lose.

== Production ==
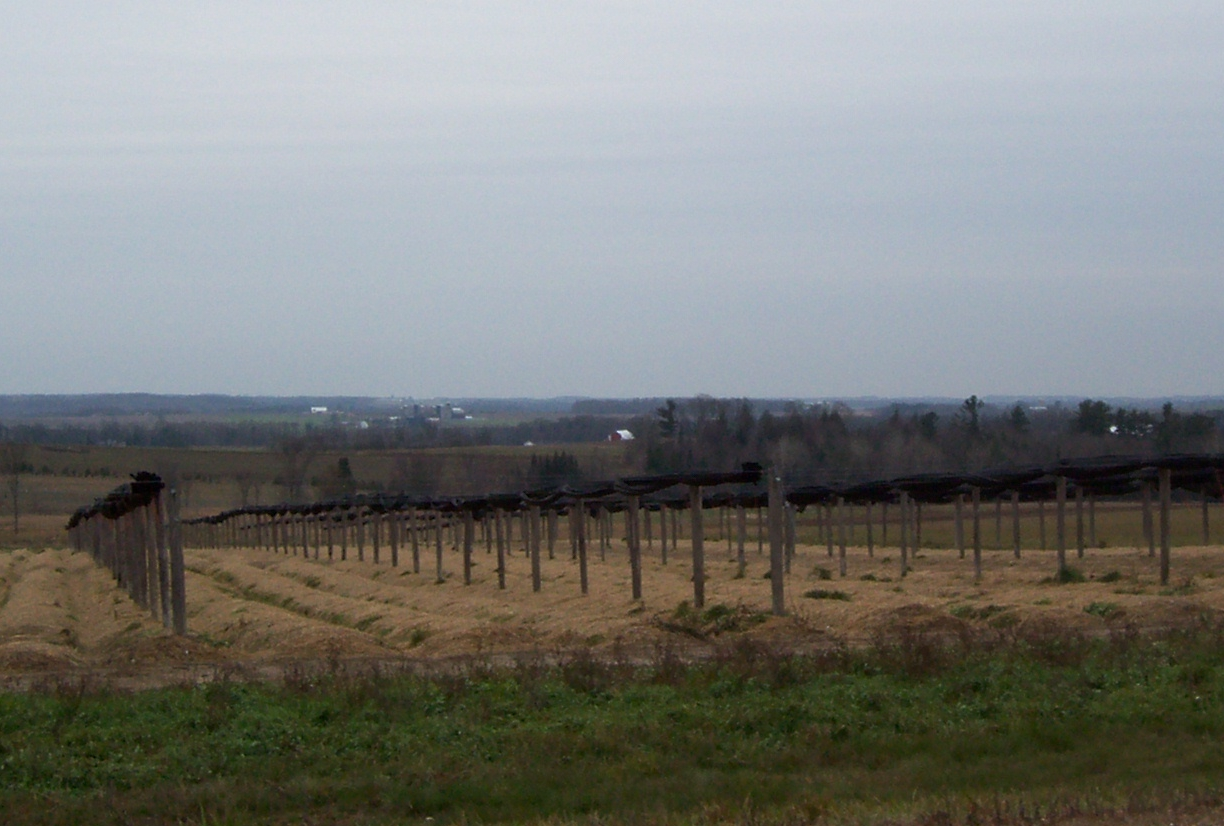
Scenes in the episode were filmed in a ginseng field in Kamloops, British Columbia (Wisconsin pictured).

The appearance of Samantha Mulder, this time as a clone of her from when she was still a little girl, was due to series creator Chris Carter's desire to bring her back. Carter felt Samantha was an important element of the show, referring to her as being part of the lifeblood of the series. The decision to kill the character X was made at the end of the third season. The writers felt that they could only do so much with the character and decided that they would either make him a bigger player on the show, or have him pay the price for collaborating with Fox Mulder. Ultimately they decided on the latter. This led to the introduction of Marita Covarrubias at the end of the episode, Mulder's latest informant.

The exterior shots of the crop fields in the episodes were filmed in ginseng fields, which writer Frank Spotnitz felt had an "otherworldly" quality to them. These fields were located near the city of Kamloops, which is approximately a three-and-a-half-hour drive from Vancouver; a location from which the production had rarely strayed during its first five seasons. The hair, makeup and wardrobe truck ended up getting lost while driving there. A fiberglass composite lattice used by the aircraft industry was used to create the honeycombs through which the alien bounty hunter chases Mulder.

The death of X was a prominent scene in the episode, and it took several takes to complete the final scene; with Spotnitz feeling that "it was a good way to send him off". Director R. W. Goodwin has noted that he is responsible for directing the episodes that featured the deaths of X, Deep Throat, Mulder's father, and Scully's sister.

Thousands of live bees were used during production, with the understanding that the bees would not sting without a queen present. However, this theory proved incorrect, and Vanessa Morley, who played the Samantha Mulder clones, was stung during filming. She kept quiet and did not react until the scene had finished filming, leading Spotnitz to call her "a trooper". The cold open for the episode, with multiple cloned boys, was achieved with motion control photography, allowing for two children to play all five of the clones; multiple takes were recorded with the boys in different positions, and with the camera controlled by a computer to follow exactly the same motions for each take, these could be seamlessly composited together.

The episode title comes from the German word for "master race". The tagline for this episode is "Everything Dies" instead of the usual "The Truth is Out There". This phrase is uttered by the bounty hunter to Mulder during the episode. During the production of "Herrenvolk", Carter had already begun the pre-production phases of the series' feature film adaptation, which would be released in 1998.

== Broadcast and reception ==
This is the sort of mythology episode that would ultimately give the show a bad name, as it adjusts and shifts established elements, gives us a few token new pieces of information, but makes sure to tie up any loose end that could potentially change the show's dynamic too aggressively.

— The A.V. Club's Zack Handlen on the episode's plotting.

"Herrenvolk" premiered on the Fox network on October 4, 1996. The episode earned a Nielsen household rating of 13.2 with a 23 share, meaning that roughly 13.2 percent of all television-equipped households, and 23 percent of households watching television, were tuned in to the episode. A total of 21.11 million viewers watched this episode during its original airing, making it the first episode of The X-Files watched by more than 20 million people.

In an overview of the fourth season in Entertainment Weekly, "Herrenvolk" was rated an A−. It was noted that the episode "makes good use of locations", and the ambiguous resolution to Jeremiah Smith's plot arc was seen as a positive, as it "opens the door to all sorts of provocative potentialities". Writing for The A.V. Club, Zack Handlen rated the episode a B+, though he felt it suffered from "treading-water plotting". Handlen also described the episode as being tense on its own, but suffering from "stagnation" when held as part of the series' ongoing mythology. He cited the death of X as an example of this, feeling that the scene was "appropriately shocking" and perhaps "one of the most memorable deaths in the series"—however, the almost immediate introduction of a successor character, Marita Covarrubias, was seen as "deflat[ing] the importance" of the events.

== Bibliography ==
- Edwards, Ted (1996). X-Files Confidential. Little, Brown and Company. ISBN 0-316-21808-1.
- Meisler, Andy (1998). I Want to Believe: The Official Guide to the X-Files Volume 3. Harper Prism. ISBN 0-06-105386-4.
