= R. W. Goodwin =

American screenwriter

Robert W. Goodwin (born 1943), billed as R. W. Goodwin, is an Australian-born American television producer and director best known for his work as senior executive producer of The X-Files. He lives in Bellingham, Washington.

He also directed and produced the 2009 low-budget independent feature Alien Trespass.

== Work on the X-Files ==
Goodwin worked as Co-Executive Producer for the X-Files from 1993 through 1998. He had first met series creator Chris Carter when the two were working on separate series for NBC in the 1980s. Goodwin watched the pilot episode, met with Chris Carter, and shortly afterwards was hired as Co-Executive Producer. As Co-Executive Producer, Goodwin was chiefly responsible for all aspects of physical production on the show. He also directed a few episodes per season, usually the first and last episodes of the season.

Goodwin's work on the series ended at the end of season five when the show moved production from Vancouver to Los Angeles.

== Personal life ==
Goodwin was born in Australia, and spent most of his life in Los Angeles, before he started producing television series in Vancouver. In L.A. he performed comedy with the Credibility Gap. He later moved his family to Bellingham, Washington to be closer by. Goodwin is married to actress Sheila Larken, who played Scully's mother on the X-Files. They have two sons.

== Partial filmography ==
Producer High Risk, with James Brolin and Anthony Quinn.

- The X-Files (1993) TV Series
  - episode 1.24 The Erlenmeyer Flask (Director)
  - episode 2.08 One Breath (Director)
  - episode 2.25 Anasazi (Director)
  - episode 3.01 The Blessing Way (Director)
  - episode 3.24 Talitha Cumi (Director)
  - episode 4.01 Herrenvolk (Director)
  - episode 4.24 Gethsemane (Director)
  - episode 5.01 Redux (Director)
  - episode 5.20 The End (Director)
