= Alex Krycek =

- The X-Files character
- Nicholas Lea as Alex Krycek
- First appearance: "Sleepless"
- Last appearance: "The Truth"
- Created by: Howard Gordon; Chris Carter
- Portrayed by: Nicholas Lea

In-universe information
- Gender: Male
- Occupation: Russian conspiracy member Men in Black member FBI Special Agent
- Affiliated with: Syndicate
- Duration: 1994–2002

Alex Krycek is a fictional character in the Fox science fiction-supernatural television series The X-Files. Alex Krycek is played by Nicholas Lea. He is initially introduced in the second season as a partner for FBI Special Agent Fox Mulder in the absence of his previous partner, Dana Scully. As the show progressed, Krycek grew to become one of the show's primary antagonists, appearing subsequently in every season until Season 9. Krycek's machinations frequently pitted him against Mulder, with whom he shared a complicated relationship. He was variously seen as either a henchman or enemy of the show's primary antagonist, The Smoking Man, changing his allegiance when the situation suited him best.

== Character arc ==
Krycek is a Russian-American, the son of Cold War immigrants, who makes his first appearance in the season two episode "Sleepless", where as a young FBI Special Agent, he is assigned as a temporary investigation partner to Fox Mulder. Krycek proceeds to work with Mulder and attempts to gain his trust.

It later becomes evident, however, that Krycek is actually an undercover agent working for The Smoking Man. Krycek plays an important part in several events that are harmful to Mulder and Dana Scully: he assists in Scully's abduction, and murders Mulder's father, William "Bill" Mulder. Krycek also assaults Assistant Director Walter Skinner and acquires a secret tape from him which reveals a US government coverup regarding alien visits to Earth. After a botched attempt on Scully's life results in the death of her sister, The Smoking Man attempts to kill Krycek with a car bomb, but Krycek escapes. Krycek is later found in Hong Kong, where Mulder discovers that he has been selling information from the digital tape containing the MJ documents. Under the influence of the black oil, Krycek returns the tape to The Smoking Man, in return for knowledge of the location of an alien ship. The black oil-controlled Krycek goes to the ship, which has been moved to an abandoned missile silo in North Dakota. The black oil extracts itself from Krycek, leaving him locked indefinitely in the silo with the ship.

Krycek is next found during an FBI raid, and taken into custody by Mulder and Scully. They learn that Krycek was recruited by an extremist militia group on a salvage hunt from the silo in North Dakota, and he informs the agents they must track the source of an extraterrestrial rock, brought to America by a foreign diplomat, to a gulag in Russia. The hunt leads Krycek and Mulder to Tunguska, where they are held captive until Krycek maneuvers his own release. Mulder attempts his own escape, taking an unconscious Krycek with him. When he awakes, Krycek separates into the woods only to encounter a strange group of Russians, all of whom have missing left arms. The men amputate Krycek's arm as well, to keep him from being used in black oil experiments. Eventually, Krycek graduates into a more powerful role within this group. He uses any knowledge he has to gain leverage with the syndicate. He even has had romantic ties to their secretary, Marita Covarrubias (who apparently was using Krycek for her own means in assisting Mulder). Due to this double-crossing, Krycek is temporarily held captive by the Well Manicured Man. Krycek later appears to Mulder as a friendly messenger to tell him that a war has begun, and that Mulder must "resist or serve".

Later in the series, Krycek can be seen switching sides as it suits him, occasionally helping Mulder, the Cigarette Smoking Man and other people. He attempted to blackmail Skinner with infectious nanotechnology, but ended up being thrown into a Tunisian prison by the Cigarette Smoking Man. In the season seven finale, "Requiem", Krycek apparently kills the now wheelchair-using Cigarette Smoking Man by pushing him down a flight of stairs. Later, when Mulder was abducted by aliens and returned in a deathlike state, Krycek attempts to again blackmail Skinner, offering the means to save Mulder's life in exchange for Scully's baby. Skinner refuses, and Krycek has a violent confrontation with John Doggett before escaping. In the season eight finale, "Existence", Krycek is shot dead by Skinner, during an unsuccessful attempt to kill Mulder. Krycek's ghost briefly showed up to help Mulder escape a military base in the series finale.

== Conceptual history ==
Originally, the role of Krycek was offered to Callum Keith Rennie, who rejected it, but later made two guest appearances on the show. Krycek does not appear in the first season, but Nicholas Lea did have a small part in the Monster-of-the-Week episode, "Gender Bender". In the episode, he played a club goer named "Michel". When Lea appeared as Krycek, the producers felt that they could kill him off if the portraying actor didn't do a good enough job. Krycek, who was initially created by writer Howard Gordon to temporarily replace Scully as Mulder's partner for three episodes, eventually grew into a character that lasted eight seasons on the show. The character appears in 22 episodes between seasons two and nine.

== Appearances in episodes ==
- Season 2: "Sleepless", "Duane Barry", "Ascension", "Anasazi"
- Season 3: "The Blessing Way", "Paper Clip", "Piper Maru", "Apocrypha"
- Season 4: "Tunguska", "Terma"
- Season 5: "Patient X", "The Red and the Black", "The End"
- Season 6: "S.R. 819", "Two Fathers", "One Son", "Biogenesis"
- Season 7: "The Sixth Extinction II: Amor Fati", "Requiem"
- Season 8: "Deadalive", "Essence", "Existence"
- Season 9: "The Truth"
