= Terma (The X-Files) =

- The X-Files episode
- Episode no.: Season 4 Episode 9
- Directed by: Rob Bowman
- Written by: Chris Carter; Frank Spotnitz
- Production code: 4X10
- Original air date: December 1, 1996
- Running time: 44 minutes

Guest appearances
- Mitch Pileggi as Walter Skinner; William B. Davis as The Smoking Man; Nicholas Lea as Alex Krycek; John Neville as the Well-Manicured Man; Jessica Schreier as Dr. Bonita Charne-Sayre; Stefan Arngrim as a Prisoner; Brendan Beiser as Agent Pendrell; Campbell Lane as the Committee Chairman; Pamela MacDonald as a Nurse; Brenda McDonald as Auntie Janet; Igor Morozov as a Russian Horseman; Robin Mossley as Dr. Kingsley Looker; Eileen Pedde as Angie; Jan Rubeš as Vasily Peskow; Brent Stait as Terry Edward Mayhew; Malcolm Stewart as Dr. Sacks; Fritz Weaver as Senator Sorenson

Episode chronology
← Previous "Tunguska"	Next → "Paper Hearts"
- The X-Files season 4

"Terma" is the ninth episode of the fourth season of the American science fiction television series The X-Files. It premiered on the Fox network on December 1, 1996. It was directed by Rob Bowman, and written by Frank Spotnitz and series creator Chris Carter. "Terma" featured guest appearances by John Neville, Nicholas Lea and Fritz Weaver. The episode helped explore the series' overarching mythology. "Terma" earned a Nielsen household rating of 10.3, being watched by 17.34 million viewers during its original airing.

FBI special agent Dana Scully (Gillian Anderson) and assistant director Walter Skinner (Mitch Pileggi) attend a United States Senate hearing, while Fox Mulder (David Duchovny) attempts to escape from a Russian gulag. "Terma" is the second part of a two-part episode, continuing the plot from the previous episode, "Tunguska". "Terma" served as a continuation of the series' black oil mythology, following the earlier episodes "Piper Maru", "Apocrypha", and "Tunguska".

Several scenes in "Terma" were inspired by the novels of Aleksandr Solzhenitsyn, while its tagline—changed to "E pur si muove" from the usual "The truth is out there"—is a reference to Galileo Galilei's investigation by the Roman Inquisition. "Terma" features a climactic explosion at an oil refinery wellhead which required the physical effects staff to ignite a 300 feet (91 m) plume of flammable liquids.

== Plot ==
While imprisoned in a gulag in Krasnoyarsk, Fox Mulder (David Duchovny) learns that Alex Krycek (Nicholas Lea) is a double agent working for the Russian taskmasters and that all prisoners have been subjected to a black oil vaccine. In his dungeon, Mulder is given a sharp object by another prisoner, who had made it to commit suicide. When all the prisoners are taken out and are arranged in a line, Mulder sees Krycek talking to one of the captors and runs toward them, tackling them. Mulder then steals a truck and flees with an unconscious Krycek in the back of it; a pursuit by his captors ensues. As Mulder drives the truck, Krycek awakes and jumps off the truck. Mulder, having been unable to stop the truck due to its faulty brakes, runs the truck off the road and it crashes. Mulder quickly makes his way out of the truck and hides under the dry leaves, while Krycek is found by a group of men whose left arms have all been amputated and has his arm forcibly severed to prevent his involvement in black oil vaccination tests.

Meanwhile, Vasily Peskow (Jan Rubeš), a former KGB agent, has come out of retirement and traveled to the United States where he assassinates Bonita Charne-Sayre, a doctor who is developing a black oil vaccine for the Syndicate. He then tracks down Charne-Sayre's test subjects and tests the Russian vaccine on them before killing them to cover his tracks.

Mulder is found by a group of Russian peasants (one of whom owns the truck that Mulder stole), who help him return to the United States, and rejoins his partner Dana Scully (Gillian Anderson). Scully and assistant director Walter Skinner (Mitch Pileggi) had been detained by a United States Senate committee seeking to uncover Mulder's whereabouts when they cannot reveal his current location, but the committee was adjourned upon Mulder's arrival. The agents attempt to track down Peskow, following a trail of murders in Boca Raton, Florida, as well as locating a stolen truck. However, the assassin is able to outwit the agents, and destroys the last of the oil-containing rocks seen in the previous episode in an oil-well explosion after Mulder fails to remove the bomb. He returns to Russia, where it is revealed that he had been hired for this task by Krycek.

== Production ==
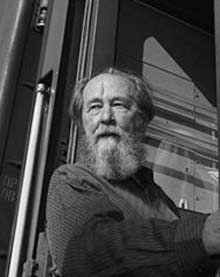
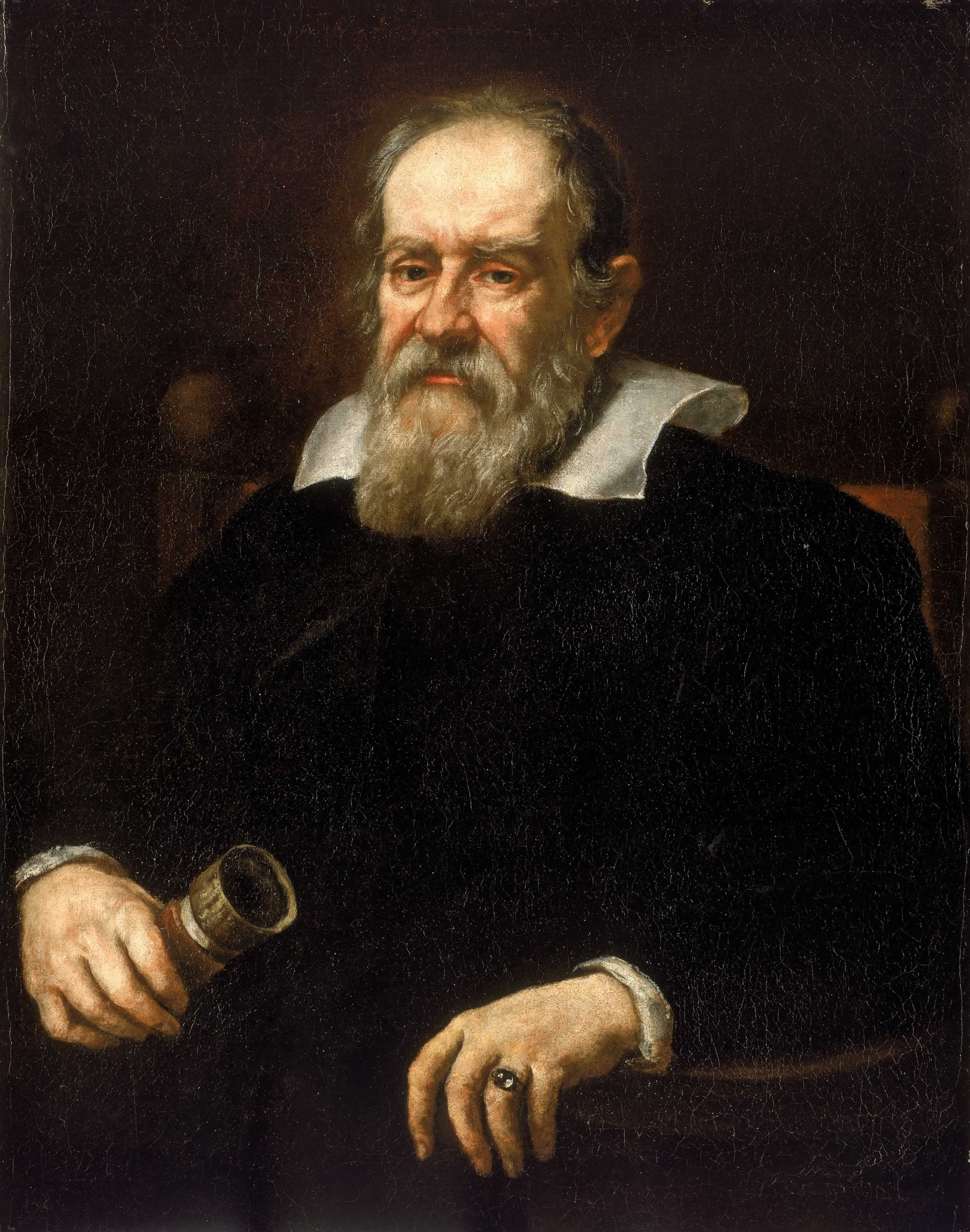
The episode's gulag scenes were inspired by Aleksandr Solzhenitsyn (left), while its tagline is a reference to Galileo Galilei (right)

The episode's title refers to terma, a set of Buddhist teachings hidden from the world. Series creator Chris Carter felt these represented the secrets kept by the Syndicate. The opening credits of the episode saw the series' usual tagline of "The truth is out there" replaced with "E pur si muove". The phrase is Italian for "and yet, it moves", and is attributed to the astronomer Galileo Galilei, when forced by the Roman Inquisition to denounce his belief in heliocentrism. The episode's gulag scenes were inspired by Aleksandr Solzhenitsyn's works The Gulag Archipelago (1973) and One Day in the Life of Ivan Denisovich (1963).

Shots of the oil refinery seen in the episode were filmed at a thermal energy station situated in Port Moody, British Columbia. The climactic oil-well explosion was achieved through physical effects, with crew member Dave Gauthier building a replica wellhead in a disused rock quarry, through which liquid was piped at pressures of 250 pounds per square inch (1,700,000 Pa) to create a plume 300 feet (91 m) high. This wellhead was rigged to spray oil-colored water for shots of the plume itself, which was switched with a remote control to a stream of kerosene and liquid propane for the shots involving the oil catching fire.

Actor Nicholas Lea, who plays recurring character Alex Krycek, worked with a Russian-speaking vocal coach to ensure that his dialogue was delivered with the correct accent and stresses. Malcolm Stewart, who portrayed NASA scientist Dr. Sacks in the episode, had previously appeared in several earlier episodes of the series, including "Pilot", the second season episode "3", and the third season's "Avatar". Carter has called "Terma", along with its companion piece "Tunguska", "an action piece from beginning to end".

== Reception ==
"Terma" premiered on the Fox network on December 1, 1996. The episode earned a Nielsen household rating of 10.6 with a 15 share, meaning that roughly 10.6 percent of all television-equipped households, and 15 percent of households watching television, were tuned in to the episode. A total of 17.34 million viewers watched this episode during its original airing.

Writing for The A.V. Club, Zack Handlen rated the episode a B−, finding that it contained too much "vamping for time", without enough focus on any of the individual plot threads. Handlen felt that the plot thread based on the murder of the Well-Manicured Man's doctor friend should have been the episode's focus, and derided the "pomposity" of the dialogue elsewhere in the episode. Based on an advance viewing of the episode's script, Entertainment Weekly rated "Terma" an A−, praising the "arms race" plotline. Robert Shearman, in his book Wanting to Believe: A Critical Guide to The X-Files, Millennium & The Lone Gunmen, rated "Terma" one star out of five, comparing it unfavorably with the previous episode. Shearman described the episode as "awful", noting that there "is virtually no structure to it at all". The author also critique the episode's dialogue as "dreadful, boring and facile", with its long, clumsy lines becoming "ever more complex and ever less interesting".

== Bibliography ==
- Edwards, Ted (1996). X-Files Confidential. Little, Brown and Company. ISBN 0-316-21808-1.
- Meisler, Andy (1998). I Want to Believe: The Official Guide to the X-Files Volume 3. Harper Prism. ISBN 0-06-105386-4.
- Shearman, Robert (2009). Wanting to Believe: A Critical Guide to The X-Files, Millennium & The Lone Gunmen. Mad Norwegian Press. ISBN 978-0-9759446-9-1.
