= Mythology of The X-Files =

The mythology of The X-Files, sometimes referred to as its "mytharc" by the show's staff and fans, follows the quest of FBI Special Agents Fox Mulder (David Duchovny), a believer in supernatural phenomena, and Dana Scully (Gillian Anderson), his skeptical partner. Their boss, FBI Assistant Director Walter Skinner, was also often involved. Beginning with season 8, John Doggett, another skeptic, and Monica Reyes, a believer like Mulder, were introduced. The overarching story, which spans events as early as the 1940s, is built around a government conspiracy to hide the truth about alien existence and their doomsday plan. Not all episodes advanced the mythology plot, but those that did were often set up by Mulder or Scully via an opening monologue.

Most mythological elements in The X-Files relate to extraterrestrial beings, referred to by the writers as "Colonists", whose primary goal is to colonize Earth. Late in the series, this was revealed to have been planned for the year 2012.

== Episodes ==
This list of mythology episodes was originally taken from official sources, The X-Files Mythology range of DVDs, and the book The Complete X-Files: Behind the Series, the Myths and the Movies.

# In Season	Title	Original Air Date	Notes
Season 1
1	Pilot	September 10, 1993	
2	Deep Throat	September 17, 1993	
10	Fallen Angel	November 19, 1993	
17	E.B.E.	February 18, 1994	
24	The Erlenmeyer Flask	May 13, 1994	
Season 2
1	Little Green Men	September 16, 1994	
5	Duane Barry	October 14, 1994	
6	Ascension	October 21, 1994	
8	One Breath	November 11, 1994	DVD only
10	Red Museum	December 9, 1994	
16	Colony	February 10, 1995	
17	End Game	February 17, 1995	
25	Anasazi	May 19, 1995	
Season 3
1	The Blessing Way	September 22, 1995	
2	Paper Clip	September 29, 1995	
9	Nisei	November 24, 1995	
10	731	December 1, 1995	
15	Piper Maru	February 9, 1996	
16	Apocrypha	February 16, 1996	
24	Talitha Cumi	May 17, 1996	
Season 4
1	Herrenvolk	October 4, 1996	
7	Musings of a Cigarette Smoking Man	November 17, 1996	
8	Tunguska	November 24, 1996	
9	Terma	December 1, 1996	
14	Memento Mori	February 9, 1997	
17	Tempus Fugit	March 16, 1997	
18	Max	March 23, 1997	
21	Zero Sum	April 27, 1997	
23	Demons	May 11, 1997	Book only
24	Gethsemane	May 18, 1997	
Season 5
1	Redux	November 2, 1997	
2	Redux II	November 9, 1997	
6	Christmas Carol	December 7, 1997	Book only
7	Emily	December 14, 1997	Book only
13	Patient X	March 1, 1998	
14	The Red and the Black	March 8, 1998	
20	The End	May 17, 1998	
The X-Files: Fight the Future (feature-length film set between Seasons 5 and 6)
Season 6
1	The Beginning	November 8, 1998	
9	S.R. 819	January 17, 1999	
11	Two Fathers	February 7, 1999	
12	One Son	February 14, 1999	
22	Biogenesis	May 16, 1999	
Season 7
1	The Sixth Extinction	November 7, 1999	
2	The Sixth Extinction II: Amor Fati	November 14, 1999	
10	Sein Und Zeit	February 6, 2000	
11	Closure	February 13, 2000	DVD only
15	En Ami	March 19, 2000	
22	Requiem	May 21, 2000	DVD only
Season 8
1	Within	November 5, 2000	
2	Without	November 12, 2000	
11	The Gift	February 4, 2001	Book only
13	Per Manum	February 18, 2001	
14	This Is Not Happening	February 25, 2001	
15	DeadAlive	April 1, 2001	
16	Three Words	April 8, 2001	
18	Vienen	April 29, 2001	
20	Essence	May 13, 2001	
21	Existence	May 20, 2001	
Season 9
1	Nothing Important Happened Today	November 11, 2001	
2	Nothing Important Happened Today II	November 18, 2001	
6	Trust No 1	January 6, 2002	
9	Provenance	March 3, 2002	
10	Providence	March 10, 2002	DVD only
16	William	April 28, 2002	
19 20	The Truth	May 19, 2002	
Season 10
1	My Struggle	January 24, 2016	
6	My Struggle II	February 22, 2016	
Season 11
1	My Struggle III	January 3, 2018	
5	Ghouli	January 31, 2018	
10	My Struggle IV	March 21, 2018	

== Chronology ==
=== Season 1 ===
FBI Special Agent Fox Mulder (David Duchovny) has made a name for himself, "Spooky Mulder," working on X-Files—unexplained cases which may be paranormal in origin. He is appointed a partner in these investigations—Dana Scully (Gillian Anderson)—with his superiors hoping that she will be able to debunk and discredit his work. Their first case together is the investigation of possible abductions in Oregon, which falters when their evidence is destroyed in a fire. A later case, involving the disappearance of a United States Air Force test pilot, sees the introduction of secretive informant Deep Throat (Jerry Hardin), who continues to provide the agents sensitive information. This help is supplemented by conspiracy theorist group The Lone Gunmen, who are contacted for help in a further abduction case. Deep Throat is killed, however, when he helps the agents uncover details of a government human cloning program, and the X-Files unit is closed shortly thereafter.

=== Season 2 ===
Unable to continue his work with Scully, Mulder obtains information about possible extraterrestrial contact in Puerto Rico, finding that the SETI program at the Arecibo Observatory is being forcibly closed. Although the pair are allowed to resume their work, Scully is later kidnapped by an unhinged multiple alien abductee, Duane Barry. Barry takes Scully to a hilltop where she is then abducted, presumably by aliens. She is found comatose at a later date, having mysteriously arrived at a hospital, and recovers several days later. Mulder receives a call from his father, who informs him that his sister Samantha (Megan Leitch), who had been abducted as a child, has returned. Samantha is being pursued by a shapeshifting bounty hunter, who is assassinating human clones. Samantha is killed, although it is revealed that she was simply one of a number of clones, produced using alien tissue to create an alien-human hybrid.

The Lone Gunmen contact Mulder and Scully about a successful attempt by a friend of theirs to hack the United States Department of Defense computer system. The hacker, Kenneth Soona (Bernie Coulson), is able to give Mulder the downloaded information on a digital cassette. Soona is subsequently assassinated, and the downloaded files are found to be written in Navajo. Contacting Albert Hosteen (Floyd Red Crow Westerman)—a Navajo man capable of translating the files—Mulder is shown a box-car full of what appear to be alien corpses. He is trapped in the box-car by the series' antagonist, The Smoking Man (William B. Davis), and left for dead after it is destroyed.

=== Season 3 ===
Mulder is later found and nursed back to health by Hosteen. Meanwhile, Scully investigates the possible involvement of the smallpox eradication program in human genetic experimentation, discovering that a Nazi scientist who defected during Operation Paperclip has been conducting human experimentation to create alien-human hybrids. Dana's sister Melissa (Melinda McGraw) is shot by assassins who mistake her for Dana, and dies in the hospital. Investigating evidence of an alien autopsy, Mulder infiltrates a secretive government train carriage carrying an alien-human hybrid being experimented on by Japanese scientists. Mulder is almost killed by a Syndicate operative guarding the hybrid, but is saved by his informant X (Steven Williams). X had been tipped off about Mulder's activities by Scully. Scully, meanwhile, meets a group of women with abduction experiences similar to her own, and meets another member of the Syndicate known as the First Elder (Don S. Williams). The First Elder claims that during Scully's abduction she was placed on a similar train car and experimented upon by the Japanese scientists.

The crew of a French salvage ship trying to raise a World War II-era submarine from the sea floor are stricken with massive radiation burns—except for one man, who has been infected with a parasitic black oil discovered on the submarine. The black oil, controlling the crewman's body, passes into the crewman's wife and uses her to travel to Hong Kong in pursuit of a middleman selling government secrets. Mulder is after the same man. After Mulder catches Alex Krycek (Nicholas Lea) in Hong Kong, the black oil passes itself to Krycek. Scully determines that the submarine had been involved in discovering the black oil on the sea floor during World War II, under the guise of finding a sunken fighter plane. The infected Krycek makes his way to a missile silo used to hide a UFO, and the black oil escapes his body to board the craft. Meanwhile, Scully has tracked down Luis Cardinal, the man responsible for killing her sister.

=== Season 4 ===
When the Syndicate suspect that a member is passing information to Mulder and Scully, they organise a canary trap to find the leak, using information about the safety of Mulder's mother as bait. X's role as an informant is discovered, and he is shot dead, although he is able to pass along the name of another informant who can be of use to Mulder—Marita Covarrubias (Laurie Holden), the Special Representative to the Secretary-General of the United Nations. Mulder seeks Covarrubias' aid when he attempts to reach the site of the Tunguska event, in Russia, to investigate the source of a further black oil contamination. While there, Mulder is held in a gulag and used—successfully—as a test subject for a black-oil vaccine. He escapes and is able to return to America, having found out that Krycek is working with the Russians. Scully, who has been diagnosed with cancer, is unsure of her future with the FBI. Mulder is convinced that her condition is a result of her earlier abduction, and is prepared to make a deal with the Syndicate to find a cure. He is dissuaded by Walter Skinner (Mitch Pileggi), who secretly makes such a deal himself.

=== Season 5 ===
While being pursued by an assassin responsible for a hoax alien corpse discovered on a mountaintop, Mulder fakes his own suicide, mutilating the assassin's face to provide a decoy body. He uses the distraction to infiltrate The Pentagon in search of a cure for Scully's cancer. Meanwhile, Scully is able to uncover and reveal a Syndicate connection within the FBI.

While a rebel alien race secretly attacks several groups of former alien abductees, the agents meet Cassandra Spender (Veronica Cartwright), a woman who claims to be a multiple abductee and wants to deliver a positive message about aliens. After Cassandra goes missing and her son, Jeffrey Spender (Chris Owens), angrily attempts to push his way into the FBI, Mulder has Scully put under hypnosis to learn the truth about her abduction. The Syndicate, meanwhile, speed up their tests of the black oil vaccine, sacrificing their own to do so. Later, the assassination of a chess grandmaster leads Mulder and Scully into an investigation that strikes at the heart of the X-Files: They learn that the assassin's real target was a telepathic boy named Gibson Praise (Jeff Gulka).

=== The X-Files: Fight the Future (feature film) ===
The X-Files have been shut down again, and Mulder and Scully are sent on a mission to deal with a terrorist bomb threat. However, after a government building is destroyed, Mulder is approached by a mysterious doctor, Alvin Kurtzweil (Martin Landau), who reveals that a new strain of the black oil has been discovered in North Texas. The new strain allows an extraterrestrial to gestate inside the host within 96 hours. Kurtzweil argues that the conspiracy deliberately placed the bomb within the government to hide the evidence. After Scully is stung by a black-oil-infected bee and abducted, the Well-Manicured Man gives Mulder her location and a weak vaccine, developed by the Syndicate. The Well-Manicured Man is killed by a car bomb, but his information leads Mulder to Antarctica, where he discovers a massive alien spaceship buried. Inside the ship, he finds Scully and administers the vaccine, which heals her.

=== Season 6 ===
In Washington, D.C., Mulder appears before an FBI panel regarding his experiences in Antarctica, but is later denied reassignment to the X-Files division: Mulder and Scully have been replaced by Spender and Diana Fowley (Mimi Rogers). After a scientist working for the Syndicate accidentally comes into contact with the black oil and gestates an alien, Mulder and Scully attempt to track the creature down in Phoenix, Arizona before the Syndicate can capture it. Skinner is mysteriously poisoned by a nanorobot infection. The culprit is Krycek, who continues to control the potentially debilitating nanotechnology in Skinner's system in order to achieve his goals.

Mulder and Scully learn of reports of rebel aliens burning doctors who were working on Cassandra. After they locate her, she informs them that the aliens are here to destroy all life on Earth and that she is a successful alien-human hybrid. The Smoking Man reveals everything to Diana Fowley, who agrees to help him and betray Mulder. Fowley forces Mulder, Cassandra, and Scully to go to a CDC facility at Fort Marlene. Meanwhile, the Syndicate meets at a check point, expecting to be taken away by the Colonists, who are preparing for invasion. They are met, instead, by the alien rebels, who incinerate them all, including Cassandra. The Smoking Man and Fowley manage to escape. Jeffrey Spender is then purportedly killed by The Smoking Man. Several months later, an inscribed metallic artifact is found on a beach on Africa's Côte d'Ivoire. Mulder examines rubbings of the object and falls into a dangerous coma. Hoping to find a cure for her partner, Scully rushes to Africa and discovers a massive wrecked spacecraft partially buried in the ocean.

=== Season 7 ===
Skinner and Michael Kritschgau (John Finn) try desperately to learn the truth about the alien object. Unsuccessful, Scully returns from Africa to see Mulder, but she is told that he has disappeared. She contacts Kritschgau and Skinner, trying to find her partner. In fact, The Smoking Man has taken Mulder away to transplant the telepathic part of Mulder's brain into his own cranium. The surgery is a failure. Mulder develops an inoperable, terminal brain tumor after the surgery; he keeps the news from Scully.

While investigating the bizarre disappearance of a young girl from her home, Mulder soon discovers the truth about his sister's abduction. He and Scully find evidence proving that Samantha was abducted by The Smoking Man, who forced her to live in a now-abandoned US Army base and experimented on her. Mulder also learns that his sister was taken by a "walk-in," a benevolent spirit who saves the souls of children doomed to die in suffering. Mulder is eventually reunited with the spirit of his sister, allowing him to finally let her go. Mulder and Scully investigate a case of alien abduction which leads them back to Oregon, the site of their first case together where Mulder is taken by a UFO.

=== Season 8 ===
Scully soon meets Special Agent John Doggett (Robert Patrick), the leader of an FBI taskforce organized to search for Mulder. Although the search proves unsuccessful, Doggett is assigned to the X-Files, and he works with Scully to search for explanations for several cases. When Scully learns that several women have reportedly been abducted and impregnated with alien babies, she begins to question her own pregnancy.

Doggett introduces Scully to Monica Reyes (Annabeth Gish), an FBI specialist in ritualistic crime, shortly before Mulder's dead body suddenly appears in a forest at night. Following Mulder's funeral, Assistant Director Skinner is threatened by Krycek, who tells him that he must kill Scully's baby before it is born. Billy Miles, a multiple abductee who disappeared on the same night as Mulder, is returned as a corpse, but his dead body is resurrected and restored to full health. Mulder also returns from death, with Scully supervising his recovery. Fully rejuvenated and healed of his earlier brain tumor, Mulder investigates several X-Files, against orders, and he is soon fired, leaving Doggett in charge of the cases. Mulder continues to provide input in an unofficial capacity.

Reluctantly accepting Krycek's assistance, Mulder, Doggett and Skinner learn that an alien virus recently created in secret by members of the United States government has replaced several humans, including Billy Miles and several high-ranking FBI personnel, with so-called alien "Super Soldiers". Krycek claims that the soldiers are virtually unstoppable aliens who want to make sure that humans will not survive the colonization of Earth. They have learned that Scully's baby is a miraculously special child and are afraid that it may be more powerful than they are.

When Miles arrives at the FBI Headquarters, Mulder, Doggett, Skinner and Krycek help Scully to escape along with Reyes, who drives her to a remote farm. Shortly after, Skinner kills Krycek, and Scully delivers an apparently normal baby while the alien "Super Soldiers" surround her. Without explanation, the aliens leave the area when Mulder arrives. While Doggett and Reyes report to the FBI Headquarters, Mulder takes Scully and their newborn son, William, back to her apartment.

=== Season 9 ===
Mulder goes into hiding, Scully is reassigned to the FBI Academy, and Reyes becomes Doggett's new partner at the X-Files. Doggett, Scully, and Reyes discover a conspiracy to place chloramine in the nation's water, causing mutations and creating "Super Soldiers." This leads them to a clandestine laboratory where a secret experiment connected to Scully's child, William, is underway. The X-Files' investigation is hampered by Deputy Director Alvin Kersh (James Pickens, Jr.) and Assistant Director Brad Follmer (Cary Elwes). Scully is hopeful about reuniting with Mulder after a stranger, "Shadow Man" (Terry O'Quinn), offers to drive Mulder out of hiding. She accepts his offer, but she and Mulder are nearly killed: The man is a Super Soldier. Later on, Scully, Doggett and Reyes find evidence of a dangerous UFO cult that has found a spacecraft similar to the one Scully studied in Africa two years ago. The cult kidnaps William, but is destroyed when the baby's crying activates the ship and kills everyone while leaving William unharmed.

Doggett finds a strange, disfigured man in the X-Files office. At first he believes the man is Mulder, but it is actually Jeffrey Spender, Mulder's half-brother. Spender sticks a needle into William. The other agents believe the injection to be a virus of some kind, but it is actually a cure for William's powers. Mulder comes out of hiding to look for classified information at an army base and, after allegedly killing a supposedly indestructible "Super Soldier" Knowle Rohrer (Adam Baldwin), he is placed on trial to defend the X-Files and himself. With the help of Kersh, Scully, Reyes, Doggett, Spender, and Gibson Praise (Jeff Gulka), Mulder escapes. Mulder and Scully then travel to New Mexico to find an old "wise man", later revealed to be The Smoking Man, who tells them that the aliens will arrive in 2012. Doggett and Reyes are confronted by Knowle Rohrer, who is killed by magnetite (the only known vulnerability of the "Super Soldiers"). The four agents then escape from a pair of black helicopters that kill The Smoking Man with missile fire. Scully and Mulder are last seen together in a motel room, facing an uncertain future.

=== Season 10 ===
Fourteen years since leaving the X-Files, Mulder and Scully are contacted by media host Tad O'Malley who has uncovered possible evidence of the alien abductions being fabricated by the government to cover up their experiments on humans, and Mulder has a theory that everything that he and Scully were led to believe on the X-Files was made up by a conspiracy of men. Mulder and Scully find themselves being enlisted back to the FBI and working on the now reopened X-Files unit, which brings the attention of the alive Smoking Man.

Six weeks later a mass contagion, the Spartan Virus, begins to break out, causing people's immune systems to break down; all but those with alien DNA in their system. This is part of a scheme by The Smoking Man, something which has been put into motion since 2012 (the year the supposed alien invasion was meant to take place). Scully works to try and find a cure by using her alien DNA and Mulder disappears and confronts the Smoking Man in an attempt to stop his plans. Scully finds out that The Smoking Man enlisted former FBI agent Monica Reyes as an assistant to his schemes.

Mulder begins to succumb to the virus, but refuses the Smoking Man's chance of a "seat at the table." Mulder is eventually rescued by fellow agent Miller and reunited with Scully on a bridge in Washington, where she reveals Mulder needs a stem cell transplant that only their son can give them. As America is thrown into chaos, a UFO looms over Mulder, Scully and Miller on the bridge.

=== Season 11 ===
The episode "My Struggle II" is revealed to be a premonition of Scully, foreseeing the end of humanity which leads to trying to find a way to prevent it by finding her and Mulder's son. Whilst the Smoking Man looks to depopulate most of humanity, there is another group looking to kill him and prevent it from happening, also is part of their own motives which allegedly involves space colonization with a select few, something which they feel can't be done if the Smoking Man's plans succeed. The two groups are also after Scully's son William, with the revelation that the Smoking Man is his father.

It is mentioned by former Syndicate member Mr. Y (who is on the side opposing the Smoking Man) that the colonization hasn't taken place as the aliens abandoned their plans due to global warming on earth.

=== The X-Files comic book series ===
Although published in 2013, prior to the broadcast of Season 10, the comic book series is considered non-canon with the television series taking precedence in the mythology arc. In this comic book series, which is "Executive Produced" by Chris Carter, Mulder and Scully are visited by Deputy Director Skinner who informs them that someone has hacked into the FBI's files and discovered information regarding the X-Files. Scully has later gone missing and Mulder tracks down the Lone Gunmen, who had faked their deaths several years earlier, in order to help him find Scully.

FBI Agent John Doggett investigates a pipeline that mysteriously explodes and is later revealed to possess magnetite. FBI Agent Monica Reyes finds out that William's adoptive parents are dead. Mulder is also visited by the believed-to-be dead Cigarette Smoking Man. Scully, after many encounters with mysterious aliens, reports to an FBI review board that people with connections to the X-Files division are systematically being targeted by an unknown group. As a result, Mulder and Scully are reinstated as federal agents as a countermeasure.

== Production ==
=== Conception and early work ===
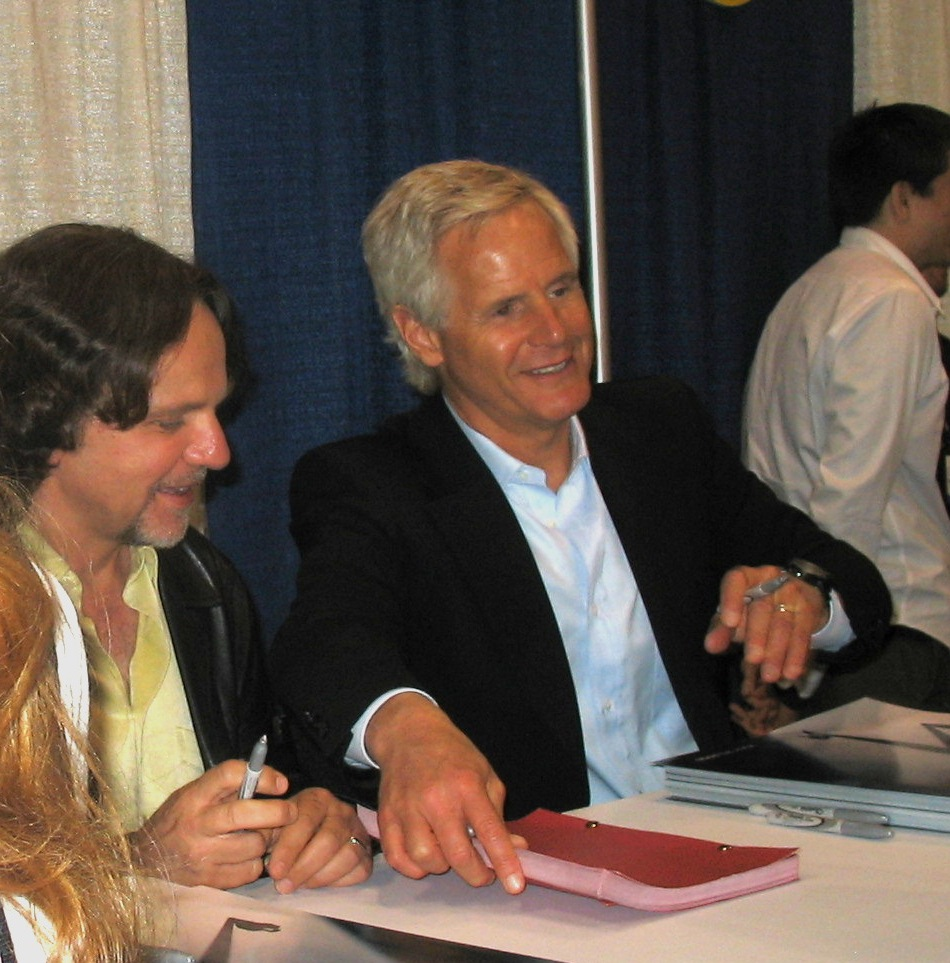
Spotnitz and Carter, the main writers for the show's mythology episodes.

At the beginning, Chris Carter did not think of creating a "mythology" for the episodes focusing on extraterrestrial life, because "they were just stories we wanted to tell," which involved Fox Mulder (David Duchovny) on his personal quest joined by his partner, Dana Scully (Gillian Anderson). Eventually, the writers saw that the most "personal" episodes were the ones centering on the government conspiracy. Another reason for the development of the mythology was that the producers were afraid of not creating a thread between the episodes centering on the conspiracy, being that they felt it would be pretentious if they did not do it.

According to Carter, the mythology "sprung from" the pilot episode and its follow up, "Deep Throat", which set up the idea that aliens had been around for many years. Carter sees the final scene of "Deep Throat" as the "launching moment for the entire mythology". The main theme for the show starts with these episodes, being Mulder's quest to find "the truth" about his sister, Samantha Mulder. Mulder's quest for the truth helped build the mythology, since his investigation took him into cases about the paranormal.

After a series of stand-alone episodes featuring UFOs and extraterrestrials early in the first season, the show's mythology developed largely based on the pregnancy of actress Gillian Anderson, who became pregnant midway through the first season. Executive producer Frank Spotnitz described it as "the best thing that ever happened to the series.", also saying "This mythology really ended up running through the life of the series, all because Gillian Anderson became pregnant". Although there were initially second thoughts about Scully (Anderson) giving birth to an alien baby, ultimately the writers decided to work around Anderson's pregnancy. The writers decided on closing the X-Files at the end of the season to separate Mulder and Scully from one another, and have Scully abducted, who would later reappear in a coma.

In addition to the creation of the storyline concerning Scully's abduction, Anderson's reduced role in the first half of the second season permitted the writers to develop some of the other characters in the show including Assistant Director Walter Skinner (Mitch Pileggi), The Smoking Man (William B. Davis) and X (Steven Williams), and resulted in the introduction of the character Alex Krycek (Nicholas Lea). Krycek, who was initially created by writer Howard Gordon to temporarily replace Scully as Mulder's partner for three episodes eventually grew into a character that lasted seven seasons on the show.

=== Creation of mythology and early seasons ===
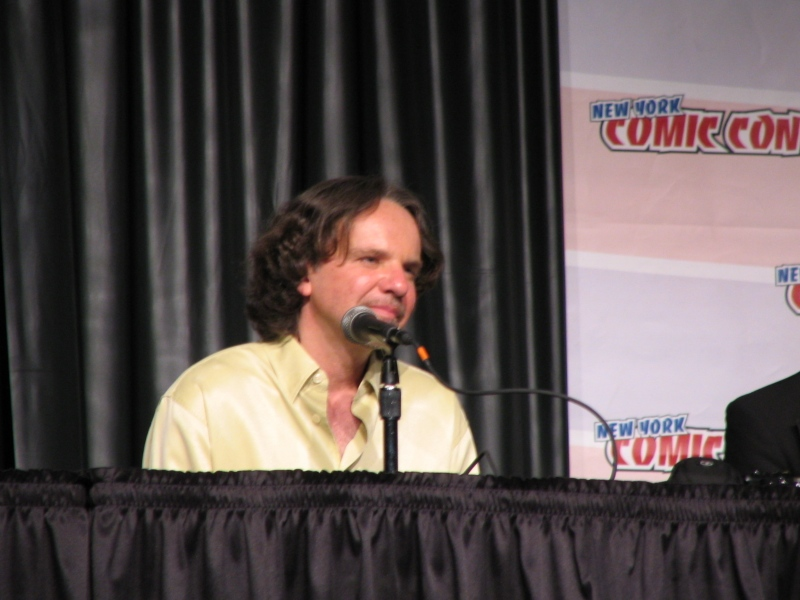
Spotnitz at the April 2008 New York Comic Con

Prior to the season two episode, "One Breath" the "Cigarette Smoking Man" mostly "lurked around in the shadows" and smoked cigarettes. The Smoking Man uttered only four audible words in the entire first season of the show, all of them being in "Tooms". R.W. Goodwin did not trust William B. Davis to take on the part as arch-nemesis to Fox Mulder. It was later revealed to the producers that Davis was running an acting school, and teaching such actors as Lucy Lawless, who would make an appearance in the ninth season.

In the two-part episodes "Colony" and "End Game", Chris Carter and Frank Spotnitz along with some help from David Duchovny created what would become a recurring character named the Alien Bounty Hunter. According to Carter, Duchovny came to him and said "Wouldn't it be great if we had like an alien bounty hunter?" Carter was positive towards the idea. The actor, Brian Thompson, auditioned for the role in a casting session, where he was competing with another actor. Spotnitz and Carter did not have much time to cast this character, but they knew this casting would be important since he was going to be a recurring character.

Thompson was chosen according to Spotnitz because he had a very "distinctive look" about him, most notably his face and mouth. After casting him, they told Thompson's agent that he needed a hair cut, because he was originally envisioned as a US Air Force pilot who had been shot down. When Thompson came to Vancouver, British Columbia, Canada there had been some "misunderstanding" between them, and he had not been told of the hair cut. So the hairstyle seen in this and every episode since was a "compromise between Thompson and the producers."

=== Mythology development in seasons 3–5 ===
"What's great about that idea is that it touches on something that everybody's done, everybody's been forced to do since we were children, get inoculated for something or other, for smallpox in this case, and to turn that into something scary is brilliant, I think, because that really means you can't trust anyone."

— John Shiban talking about the new storyline introduced with "Paper Clip".

Chris Carter admits that David Duchovny was very involved in shaping the show's mythology. His first notable efforts were "End Game" and "Anasazi". After writing the episode, Carter met with a Fox Network executive who wanted the show to explain the paranormal phenomena in each episode. Carter responded that: "the interesting part about this for me was going to be telling stories where you left people wondering at the end, with the possibility that it could be real, but never ever stating that this is in fact the truth." "Anasazi" was the first episode of a three-parter where the writers introduced the government conspiracy arc following the Syndicate. "Paper Clip" introduced the idea of genetic material that was taken through inoculations.

In season three the black oil was introduced, which was an alien creature which invaded bodies and made them into living hosts. The Black oil was able to enter through a victim's mouth, eyes or nose; it would leave a victim's body to get back to its original form or get a new host. Later on in the show's mythology, it is discovered that the Black oil is the Colonists' lifeform; the oil was brought to Earth by meteorites to create hosts of the human population living there. The season four two-parters "Tunguska" and "Terma" hit the writers when they were trying to conceive a big and fun canvas to tell stories. So they decided to create a story which had connections to the Russian gulags, which led to a "natural" idea that the Russians were experimenting separately from the Syndicate to create a vaccine for the Black oil. Shiban felt it was natural creating an arms race-like story between the United States and Russia, being that the Cold War had ended a few years earlier.

With the season five episodes "Patient X" and "The Red and the Black", the mythology became too hard for some viewers to follow. These two episodes marked the introduction of the Alien rebels who were fighting against the Colonists for their plan to colonize the known universe. These Alien rebels were of the same race as the Alien Bounty Hunters. Cassandra (Veronica Cartwright) and Jeffrey Spender (Chris Owens) would make their first appearances in these two episodes. Two other characters, Diana Fowley (Mimi Rogers) and Gibson Praise (Jeff Gulka) were introduced to the series mythology in the season five finale, "The End".

=== The X-Files feature film and seasons 6–7 ===
From the third season to the sixth season, the mysterious Syndicate was explored in detail. In the two part episode "Two Fathers"/"One Son", the Syndicate was destroyed. The plan to eliminate the Syndicate and relaunch the series' mythology in a new direction was originally conceived in September 1998. Director Kim Manners stated "I've said for years that the show really resolved itself, if you will, by accident. The whole story line of the Syndicate and the bees and the aliens and the chips in the neck, they all seemed to just accidentally fall into place and create an intriguing, mysterious storyline that eventually got so mysterious and so intriguing that Chris had to blow it up, because he couldn't deal with it anymore."

The "Biogenesis"/"The Sixth Extinction"/"Amor Fati" trio of episodes started a new mythology for the series, questioning the origin of human life. Series creator Chris Carter claimed to be interested in the subject for a while, citing the possibility of extraterrestrial involvement in great extinctions that had happened millions of years ago. Carter claimed that early in the show he had met with a man who was one of the people responsible for leading the project of mapping the human genome and that he was interested enough in the subject to tie it into the show's alien mythology. The scientific basis for extraterrestrials pursued the writers to help Mulder and Scully's beliefs come together, which was furthered in the later seasons of the show. Frank Spotnitz claimed that the ideas used in this episode had been discussed between him and Carter for a few years, and had become easier to bring up after clearing away elements of the conspiracy in the episodes "Two Fathers" and "One Son".

"Closure" was written to create an end to Mulder's quest for his sister, Samantha, who had been abducted when he was a child. The idea to close the story arc received mixed reactions from various production and crew members. However, many of the show's producers realized that the time had come to answer one of the show's biggest questions. Spotnitz explained that, "I think [series star, David Duchovny] grew tired of playing the man who is missing his sister. [...] I told him, 'This is going to be the last time you're going to have to play [that part].'" Paul Rabwin noted that, "It's been seven years. I don't think any of us are going to miss Samantha Mulder. That device and motivation were very strong in the early years of the show. But as the years have gone by, the speculation kind of melted away."

"Requiem" was written as a way to potentially end the series. While filming was underway for the seventh season, many members of the crew felt that the show had entered into its final season. Executive producer Frank Spotnitz later explained, "There was a pretty strong sentiment inside and outside the show that it was time to call it a day." Eventually, it was decided that Mulder would be abducted at the end of the seventh season, leaving things open for the actor's return in 11 episodes the following year. They eventually replaced Duchovny's Mulder with Robert Patrick's John Doggett.

=== Season eight and "The New X-Files" ===
"I figured that the best way to introduce the character was exactly the way they did it, in a mythology episode. And I think it was important for Chris and Frank and my director, Kim Manners, to really establish who this guy was, John Doggett, and what he was supposed to be doing."

— Robert Patrick talking about his introduction.

The season eight premiere, "Within", started the storyline following the Super Soldiers and the search for Mulder. As Carter always believed the only way to get the audience to keep watching the show was to give them answers. So when they cast Robert Patrick as John Doggett a new lead character, since Duchovny had sued the Fox Network and Carter for more money, while wanting to leave, the court said he must appear in 12 episodes in the eighth season and then leave.

When introducing Doggett into the series, they wanted to give him an enemy, this eventually led to the Super Soldiers, who rose up in "Within" to take on the role as the new government conspirators. The reason for creating a new enemy was to make sure not to just create a "new Mulder". The original idea for the Super Soldiers was that the United States Defense Department was developing genetically modified human beings, this was the non-alien explanation, while these characters eventually became the new aliens. Dana Scully took Mulder's role as a "believer" and handed her previous role as a "skeptic" to Doggett.

"In the course of a 24 episode season, you'd have 6 or 7 or 8 episodes that really told the story that promised more and more, that answered itself as it went along but then asked even more questions, and that kind of twisted back on itself. I mean, sometimes perhaps one time too many, but it turned out to be a story that captured a lot of people's imagination and that sustained for a remarkably long time."

— Howard Gordon talking about the mythology episodes.

Carter himself has admitted that the mythology became "complex" and a bit "too difficult to" follow, and even more difficult for the writers to "add more layers on to it". While saying it got "more interesting" in some ways but at the same time less interesting in some other ways, he said he understood why long-time fans of the show were discontent at seeing a "Mulderless" season, but at the same time said the new characters introduced new fans to the show who reacted positively to the changes.

Annabeth Gish's character Monica Reyes, who would become a main character in season nine, made her first appearance in "This Is Not Happening". When creating the character for the episode, they wanted to give the character a personality who had much in common with both Mulder and Scully. Her first shot was four in the morning and her first scene in the episode was to run down a hill to discover a former abductee. Reyes, along with Skinner, were elevated to main character status in the ninth season.

The original plan for season nine was to exit both Mulder, Scully and baby William out of the storyline in the following season. A proposed Season 10 would follow a storyline where the aliens were not the central focus of the mythology, since many of the writers, most notably Frank Spotnitz, felt that the alien-conspiracy storyline had gone on long enough "and played itself out." The story arc would instead focus on what happened to Doggett's son, Luke, and the character of Reyes.

=== Revamped mythology (revival series) ===
For the tenth season of the show (which marked the revival of the series after fourteen years), a new mythology was introduced, and the Super-Soldier arc was ignored as was the supposed alien colonization, which didn't appear to happen in December 2012.

The new mythology involved a conspiracy of men who were planning to invade and takeover America, something which was put in motion since 2012 (when the colonization was supposed to take place). The Cigarette Smoking Man was reintroduced after his apparent death at the end of the original series, appearing as one of the masterminds behind the plot. The new arc appears to contradict claims in previous seasons, and makes out that aliens are not involved in the invasion plans, rather the conspiracy of men utilizing alien technology to be used in their master plans.

For the eleventh season, it was decided to tone down on the alien mythology, and instead focus on a story arc involving Mulder and Scully attempting to track down their son William.

== Reception ==
Jay Anderson, writing for What Culture, described the mythology entries as "some of the best of the series, featuring many superb acting performances, well-crafted scripts, and nail-biting endings". Anderson added that the mythology "really held the show together". Andrew Payne of Starpulse named the "original" mytharc of seasons 1–6 a "37-way-tie" for the fifth best episode of the series, explaining that it "was the thing that made The X-Files the best show on television during its first six seasons". However, he commented that it "went awry during the inscrutable sixth season finale". IGN's Dan Iverson wrote, "I loved the X-Files from the moment I started watching it, due in no small part to the mythology that Chris Carter created. Even though we all loved the 'monster of the week' episodes, these less ostentatious gems kept us interested in what could come in the long run. The overall story arc may have eventually fizzled out, but the questioning, open-ended nature of the stories nevertheless kept us at the edge of our seats."

For the first five seasons, critics praised the development in the mythology episodes. The first-season episode "Deep Throat" was cited as beginning to "set the stage for the central conflicts" of the series. IGN's Dan Iverson felt that the episode served to "open the door to the possibilities of this series"; while Tor.com's Meghan Deans noted that "although the pilot introduced the idea of government conspiracy, it's 'Deep Throat' that kicks out the edges of the canvas". Nina Sordi of Den of Geek noted that the plotline in the second-season finale "Anasazi" laid "the groundwork for the mythology arc for the rest of the series", adding that it "brought much more significance to what is to come".

Emily St. James of The A.V. Club called the third season The X-Files' "best season and maybe one of the greatest TV seasons of all time", noting it was consistent and "[swung] from strength to strength" between mythology and stand-alone episodes. Michael Sauter of Entertainment Weekly praised the new additions to the series' mythology during the series' fifth year. As the show increased in popularity, the mythology episodes even started causing media speculation. For instance, the fourth-season episode "Gethsemane" caused newspapers to run articles on whether or not Mulder had actually died. An article in the Wall Street Journal discussed fan theories behind Mulder's madness while a cartoon ran in The New Yorker a few weeks later surrounding Mulder's "death".

After the 1998 film, the show's mythology began to receive increasingly critical reviews. Some fans felt there was no coherent plan to the main storyline and that Carter was "making it all up as he goes along." The sixth season entries "Two Fathers" and "One Son"—which are considered to be the end to the Syndicate arc—were well-received for delivering answers and closure. Earl Cressey from DVD Talk named both episodes as "highlights of season six." Joyce Millman from Salon magazine said the episodes were some "of the most coherent, [...] almost unbearably tense, hours in the series' run". Likewise, "Closure", which concluded the Samantha story-arc, was met with mixed to positive reviews; although many felt that the episode hit the right emotional notes, some felt it did not conclude the way it should have.

Many critics considered that the introduction of John Doggett and the search for Mulder in season eight helped to revitalize the series. However, once the series entered into its ninth season, most critics panned the mythology. The A.V. Club called the episodes "clumsy", noting that they were "new serialized storylines about so-called 'super soldiers'". The series finale, title "The Truth", received mixed reviews from critics. The main reason for criticism was that, instead of creating a conclusion, the episode created new questions for the audience. Robert Shearman and Lars Pearson, in their book Wanting to Believe: A Critical Guide to The X-Files, Millennium & The Lone Gunmen, gave the episode a scathing review and awarded it one star out of five. The two, despite calling the opening "promising", derided the episode's ending—especially the revelation of alien colonization of December 22, 2012—writing, "is this really what the series was about?" Furthermore, Shearman and Pearson concluded that the problem with the episode was that the show decided "to define itself in the summing up" with the episode, which did not answer very many questions. Tom Kessenich, in his book Examinations, noted that the episode "told us nothing of significance" regarding the "big picture" mythology story arc.

== See also ==
- List of The X-Files episodes, with mythology episodes marked
