= Paper Clip =

- The X-Files episode
- Mulder below an alien spaceship.
- Episode no.: Season 3 Episode 2
- Directed by: Rob Bowman
- Written by: Chris Carter
- Production code: 3X02
- Original air date: September 29, 1995
- Running time: 45 minutes

Guest appearances
- Mitch Pileggi as Walter Skinner; Walter Gotell as Victor Klemper; Melinda McGraw as Melissa Scully; Sheila Larken as Margaret Scully; Nicholas Lea as Alex Krycek; William B. Davis as The Smoking Man; John Neville as the Well-Manicured Man; Tom Braidwood as Melvin Frohike; Dean Haglund as Richard Langly; Bruce Harwood as John Fitzgerald Byers; Rebecca Toolan as Teena Mulder; Don S. Williams as the First Elder; Lenno Britos as Luis Cardinal; Floyd Westerman as Albert Hosteen

Episode chronology
← Previous "The Blessing Way"	Next → "D.P.O."
- The X-Files season 3

"Paper Clip" is the second episode of the third season of the American science fiction television series The X-Files. It premiered on the Fox network on September 29, 1995. It was directed by Rob Bowman, and written by series creator Chris Carter. "Paper Clip" featured guest appearances by Sheila Larken, Melinda McGraw and Nicholas Lea. The episode is one of those that explored the overarching mythology, or fictional history of The X-Files. "Paper Clip" earned a Nielsen household rating of 11.1, being watched by 17.2 million people in its initial broadcast. "Paper Clip" has received highly positive reviews from critics; it is generally considered by both critics and cast/crew as being among the best episodes of the series.

The show centers on FBI special agents Fox Mulder (David Duchovny) and Dana Scully (Gillian Anderson), who work on cases linked to the paranormal, called X-Files. In this episode, Mulder and Scully investigate information gleaned from secret government records, finding that a Nazi scientist working as part of Operation Paperclip may have been responsible for creating a race of human-alien hybrids. "Paper Clip" concludes a three-episode storyline, carrying on from the second season finale "Anasazi" and the third-season premiere "The Blessing Way".

The creators of the series likened themes of the episode to the Star Wars trilogy, referring to the revelations about Mulder's father, and Sophie's Choice, referring to how William Mulder was forced to choose Fox or Samantha to be taken.

== Plot ==
Continuing from the previous episode, Dana Scully (Gillian Anderson) and Walter Skinner (Mitch Pileggi) hold each other at gunpoint. Fox Mulder (David Duchovny), the person lingering outside his apartment, bursts in and forces Skinner to put his gun down. He also demands that Skinner surrender the digital tape. Skinner insists on keeping the tape, saying it is their only leverage in exposing the conspiracy.

The agents visit The Lone Gunmen, showing them an old photo featuring Bill Mulder, The Smoking Man, Deep Throat and other members of the Syndicate. The Lone Gunmen also recognize Victor Klemper, a notorious Nazi scientist who was brought to the United States under Operation Paperclip. Melvin Frohike informs Scully of her sister Melissa's condition. Mulder persuades Scully not to visit Melissa at the hospital, since she could be targeted there.

Furious that the wrong person was murdered, the Syndicate demands that the Smoking Man produce the tape. The Smoking Man promises to do so the following day. Meanwhile, Mulder and Scully visit Klemper, who says that the photo was taken at Strughold Mining Facility, a former mine in West Virginia. After the agents leave, Klemper calls the Well-Manicured Man and informs him that Mulder is alive. The news causes the Syndicate to further mistrust the Smoking Man. Meanwhile, at the hospital, Albert Hosteen visits Melissa while a suited man loiters nearby.

Mulder and Scully arrive at the mining facility and, using the code for Napier's constant given to them by Klemper, unlock one of the reinforced doors inside. They discover a large complex of filing cabinets containing smallpox vaccination records and tissue samples. Mulder finds his sister Samantha's file and finds that it was originally meant for him. Meanwhile, Skinner tells the Smoking Man that he may have found the digital tape. The Smoking Man is agitated at this, insisting that he will not make a deal with Skinner and tacitly threatening his life.

Hearing a noise, Mulder heads outside and witnesses a UFO flying overhead; inside, small beings run past Scully. Cars full of armed soldiers arrive, forcing the agents to flee. They meet with Skinner at a diner in rural Maryland. Skinner wants to turn over the tape in exchange for their reinstatement and safety. After initially objecting, Mulder agrees. Skinner heads to see Melissa in the hospital and is told by Hosteen of the suited man outside. Skinner chases the man into a stairwell, where he is attacked by Alex Krycek and Luis Cardinal, who beat him unconscious and steal the tape.

Krycek narrowly escapes an attempt on his life when his car explodes. He subsequently phones the Smoking Man, telling him that he has the tape and will make its contents public should anyone come after him. The Smoking Man lies to the rest of the Syndicate, telling them that Scully's would-be assassin was killed in the car bombing and that the tape has been destroyed with him. Mulder and Scully return to Klemper's greenhouse, finding the Well-Manicured Man there. He admits to knowing Mulder's father and states that he helped gather genetic data for post-apocalyptic identification, data Klemper used to work on alien-human hybrids. Samantha was taken to ensure Bill Mulder's silence after he learned of the experiments.

Mulder confronts his mother, who tells him that his father chose that Samantha be taken. At FBI headquarters, Skinner once again meets with the Smoking Man about the tape. The Smoking Man calls Skinner's bluff, knowing he no longer has the tape, but Skinner reveals that Hosteen and twenty other Navajo have memorized its contents and are ready to reveal it if either Mulder or Scully are harmed. Mulder meets with Scully at the hospital, who reveals that her sister died a few hours before. Mulder tells Scully that he believes that the truth is still in the X-Files. Scully tells him that she's heard the truth, and now what she wants are the answers.

== Themes ==
Jan Delasara, in the book PopLit, PopCult and The X-Files argues that episodes like "Paper Clip", or the later episodes like "Nisei" and "731", show scientists "rework[ing] the fabric of life", which is causing the public's faith in science to fade drastically. Moreover, she notes that almost all of the scientists portrayed in The X-Files are depicted with a "connection to ancient evil", with the lone exception being Agent Scully. In "Paper Clip" one of the main scientists is an ex-Nazi. As the episode proceeds, his scientific pursuits soon begin to paint him as the archetypal scientist who "goes too far", a serious factor Delasara argues "'alienates' [the public] further from science and its practitioners".

== Production ==
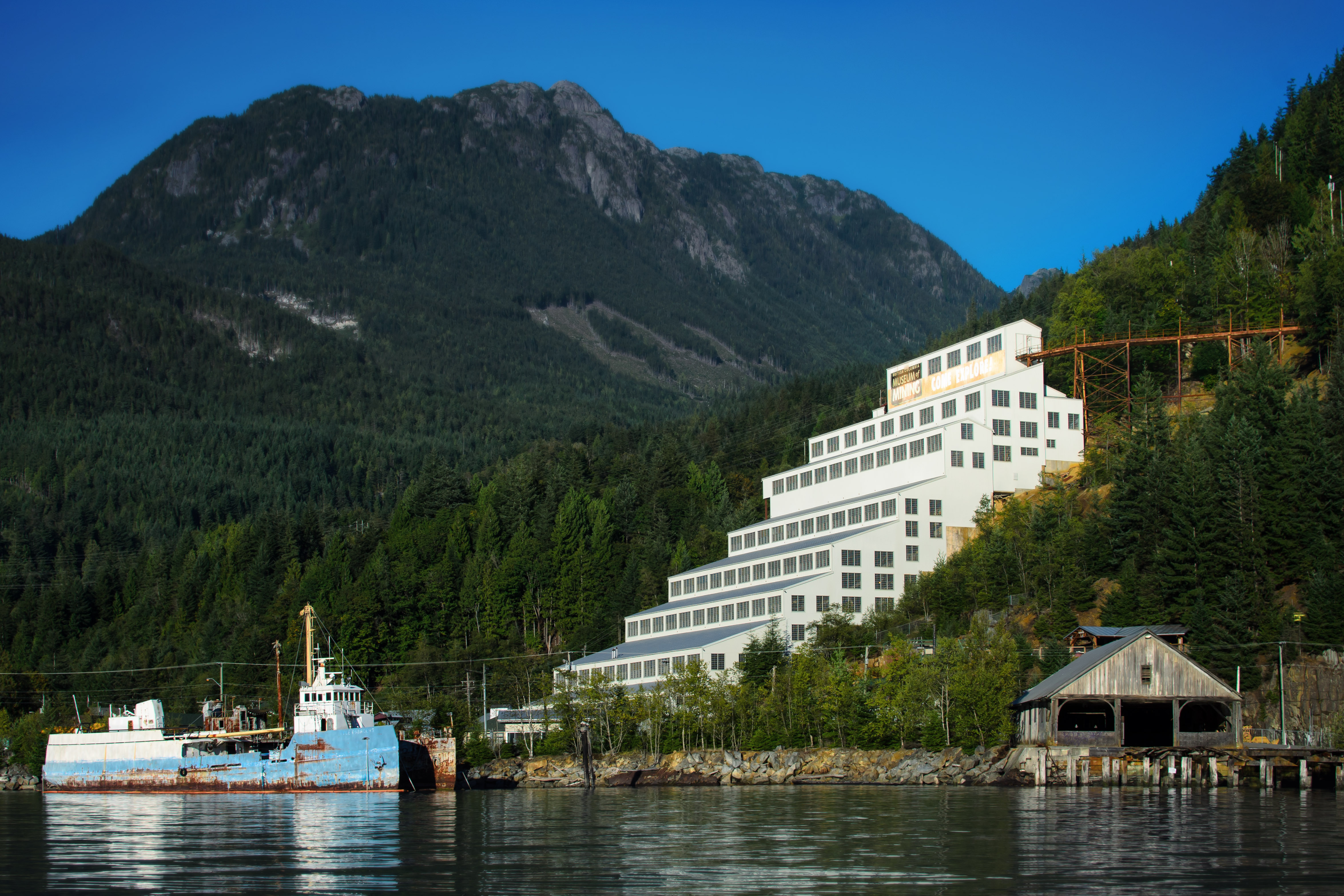
The Britannia Mine Museum, in Britannia Beach, British Columbia, Canada, stood in for the Strughold Mining Facility.

The aliens in this episode who run past Scully in the mining facility were portrayed by children aged eight and nine. The spacecraft spotted by Mulder was achieved by using a crane to lift lights over the building Mulder was outside. Napier's constant is used as a code to access the mining facility in the episode, though the code used is in error. Scully and Mulder use the code "27828" to unlock the door when in fact the first five digits of Napier's Constant are 27182. The mining facility is named for Dr. Hubertus Strughold, a real-life German scientist who was employed by the United States after World War II. The fictional Victor Klemper is based on Strughold, who was accused of conducting similar experiments on humans. The name is almost identical to a Victor Klemperer who was a German Jew that escaped persecution during World War II by fleeing to American-controlled territory. The Britannia Mine Museum, in Britannia Beach, British Columbia, Canada, stood in as the Strughold Mining Facility. This episode was dedicated in memoriam to Mario Mark Kennedy, an internet fan of the show who had died in a car accident in 1995.

Story editor Frank Spotnitz said of the episode, "I love 'Paper Clip'. I was thrilled with the plot. I know it moved very fast for some people, but I actually think that for some of these shows you don't need to understand everything. I think it is more exciting to go at rocket speed. Everybody was on the mark in that one; David and Gillian's performances, Rob Bowman's direction, Chris Carter's writing—everything was just terrific in that show". Bowman, too, felt that the episode was a standout, and he actively wondered how any of his third-season efforts would be able to "top" it. In 1996 Mitch Pileggi called the episode one of the show's finest, particularly enjoying the line where he tells The Smoking Man to "pucker up and kiss my ass". Pileggi claims that is one of his favorite lines. The scene was used frequently to introduce him at X-Files conventions.

The creators likened themes of the episode to the Star Wars trilogy, referring to the revelations about Fox Mulder's father, and Sophie's Choice, referring to how the Mulders were forced to choose Fox or Samantha to be taken. Carter included the motif of the white buffalo after reading a news story about the birth of a white buffalo calf, feeling that the image was so potent he did not mind that it did not entirely fit with the Navajo beliefs used elsewhere in the episode.

== Broadcast and reception ==
"Paper Clip" is one of the defining episodes of The X-Files because it simultaneously expands the conspiracy into the kind of giant you can never hope to fight and brings it down to a more prosaic level. The Cigarette Smoking Man is a multi-tentacled monster with his hands in everything that's out there, but he can also be defeated by a resourceful FBI director and a bunch of guys with top-notch memorization skills.

— The A.V. Club's Emily VanDerWerff on the episode's scope.

"Paper Clip" premiered on the Fox network on September 29, 1995. The episode earned a Nielsen household rating of 11.1 with a 20 share, meaning that roughly 11.1 percent of all television-equipped households, and 20 percent of households watching television, were tuned in to the episode. A total of 17.2 million viewers watched this episode during its original airing.

"Paper Clip" has received highly positive reviews from critics, who generally consider it among the best of the series. In an overview of the third season in Entertainment Weekly, "Paper Clip" was rated as A−. It was called an "outstanding episode", although Scully's unwillingness to accept the paranormal after making contact was seen as "exacerbat[ing] a maddening trend". The episode, along with both other parts of the story arc, were listed concurrently as the second-best episode of the series by Den of Geek's Nina Sordi. Sordi noted that the plotline "laid the groundwork for the mythology arc for the rest of the series", adding that it "brought much more significance to what is to come".

Writing for The A.V. Club, Emily VanDerWerff rated the episode an A+. She felt that its strengths came from its parallels with real world history, such as its handling of Operation Paperclip and the actions of the West during the Cold War, noting that "the compromises the United States and other Western nations made to survive the onslaught of communism in the Cold War were ones that should have made more of those nations' citizens take pause, stop to think about the cost of living free, but they almost never did".

== Bibliography ==
- Delasara, Jan (2000). PopLit, PopCult and The X-Files: A Critical Exploration. McFarland & Company. ISBN 0-7864-0789-1.
- Edwards, Ted (1996). X-Files Confidential. Little, Brown and Company. ISBN 0-316-21808-1.
- Lovece, Frank (1996). The X-Files Declassified. Citadel Press. ISBN 0-8065-1745-X.
- Lowry, Brian (1995). The Truth is Out There: The Official Guide to the X-Files. Harper Prism. ISBN 0-06-105330-9.
- Lowry, Brian (1996). Trust No One: The Official Guide to the X-Files. Harper Prism. ISBN 0-06-105353-8.
