= Anasazi (The X-Files) =

- The X-Files episode
- A burnt alien corpse, found in a deserted boxcar.
- Episode no.: Season 2 Episode 25
- Directed by: R. W. Goodwin
- Story by: David Duchovny; Chris Carter
- Teleplay by: Chris Carter
- Production code: 2X25
- Original air date: May 19, 1995
- Running time: 45 minutes

Guest appearances
- Peter Donat as William Mulder; Floyd "Red Crow" Westerman as Albert Hosteen; Nicholas Lea as Alex Krycek; William B. Davis as The Smoking Man; Bernie Coulson as Kenneth Soona / The Thinker; Bruce Harwood as John Fitzgerald Byers; Dean Haglund as Richard Langly; Tom Braidwood as Melvin Frohike; Mitch Pileggi as Walter Skinner

Episode chronology
← Previous "Our Town"	Next → "The Blessing Way"
- The X-Files season 2

"Anasazi" is the twenty-fifth episode and season finale of the second season of the American science fiction television series The X-Files. It premiered on the Fox network on May 19, 1995. It was written by series creator Chris Carter based on a story he developed with lead actor David Duchovny. The episode was directed by R. W. Goodwin, and featured guest appearances by Peter Donat, Nicholas Lea, Mitch Pileggi and Floyd Red Crow Westerman. The episode helped explore the overarching mythology, or fictional history of The X-Files. "Anasazi" earned a Nielsen household rating of 10.1, being watched by 9.6 million households in its initial broadcast; and received positive reviews from critics.

The show centers on FBI special agents Fox Mulder (David Duchovny) and Dana Scully (Gillian Anderson) who work on cases linked to the paranormal, called X-Files. In this episode, Mulder and Scully come into possession of a tape containing classified government files, and attempt to decipher its contents. Meanwhile, Mulder's mental health begins to deteriorate, and a mysterious corpse is discovered on a New Mexico reservation. "Anasazi" is part of a three-episode storyline, with the plot carrying on in the third season episodes "The Blessing Way" and "Paper Clip".

Series creator Chris Carter worked closely with series star David Duchovny, who shares a story credit with Carter for the episode. Because the series was filmed in Vancouver, the producers painted a disused quarry in Vancouver with 1,600 US gallons (6,100 L) of red paint and also composited in images shot in New Mexico and a blue sky in order to make the New Mexico rock quarry featured in the episode.

== Plot ==
In the desert on a Navajo Indian reservation in New Mexico, a teenage boy comes across a boxcar buried in the ground. He retrieves the corpse of an alien-like figure from the boxcar, which he takes back to the reservation and presents to the residents, including a Navajo elder named Albert Hosteen.

Shortly afterward, Kenneth Soona, a computer hacker known as "The Thinker", breaks into the Defense Department database and downloads secret files related to extraterrestrial life, putting them onto a digital tape. When the Syndicate, a secretive group of government officials, learns of the breach, the Smoking Man tells them that he has already resolved the matter, although this is a lie. The Lone Gunmen visit Mulder and inform him that Soona wants to meet with him, but are interrupted by the sound of a gunshot. When Mulder goes out to his apartment hallway to investigate, he finds that one of his neighbors has shot her husband.

Soona gives the digital tape to Mulder at a discreet meeting in a park. An excited Mulder returns to FBI headquarters, only to find that the tape is encrypted. Scully believes the encryption is based on the Navajo language and takes the tape in order to investigate. When Skinner calls Mulder to his office to question him about the tape, Mulder voices his disdain for recent case assignments and his personal belief he has recently been used to “do the government’s dirty work”. The confrontation escalates to the point where Mulder assaults Skinner. Scully is brought before an FBI panel led by Skinner and is questioned about Mulder's actions. Scully is told that Mulder faces dismissal from the FBI, and that she will suffer a similar punishment if she has lied to them.

On Martha's Vineyard, the Smoking Man visits Mulder's father, Bill, and informs him of his son's likely possession of the tape. Scully meets with a Navajo translator, who refers her to a code talker. Mulder is called away to see Bill; when Scully arrives at his apartment, she is grazed by a bullet shot through his window. When Mulder arrives at Bill's residence, his father prepares to reveal the truth about everything, but is shot and mortally wounded by Alex Krycek. When Mulder contacts Scully, she tells him to flee the scene. After Mulder arrives at her apartment, Scully takes his gun from him while he sleeps.

Scully brings the gun to the FBI for comparison against the bullet that killed Bill. When Mulder awakens, he becomes angry and suspicious towards Scully. Returning to Mulder's apartment, Scully finds his water is contaminated. As Mulder enters his building, he spots Krycek, whom he disarms and prepares to kill. Scully shoots him to prevent him from doing so, allowing Krycek to escape. Scully brings an unconscious Mulder to New Mexico. When Mulder awakens, Scully reveals that his behavior was caused by a drug placed in his water supply. She shot him because if he had killed Krycek, it would have been harder to prove his innocence in his father's death. She introduces him to Hosteen, who has been translating the files on the tape.

Scully reveals that the tape contains information on both her and Duane Barry. Hosteen introduces Mulder to his grandson, who drives him to the buried boxcar. Just before Mulder heads in, he is called by the Smoking Man, who is able to trace Mulder's location through the call. Mulder heads inside the boxcar and finds a pile of the dead creatures, each with smallpox vaccination scars on their arms. The Smoking Man arrives by helicopter with eight armed commandos and, not finding Mulder inside, orders the boxcar to be burned.

== Production ==
Series creator Chris Carter noted that the episode's creation "was the culmination of a lot of ideas. Generally, when we pitch stories to the staff everyone comments on them, and Darin Morgan called this the kitchen sink episode, because it had so much in it, he didn't know how we would pull it off. But I'm very proud of the script. David Duchovny and I worked quite closely on the story and he had a lot of input, and then I sat down and wrote the script". He felt that the episode ended the season in the best manner possible, asking more questions than it answered. The episode tried to make similar cliffhangers as the previous season finale, with revelations such as Mulder's father being part of the conspiracy and later killed to "prove anything could happen in The X-Files". "Anasazi" was the second of two second-season episodes for which David Duchovny received story credit.

To create the New Mexico rock quarry in this episode, the producers painted a disused quarry in Vancouver with 1,600 US gallons (6,100 L) of red paint, and also composited images shot in New Mexico and a blue sky to make it look more authentic. The painting of the quarry was achieved with a series of cranes, and required the permission of local environmental groups. When early seasons of the show were re-released in 16:9 widescreen for home video and streaming services in 2016, this practical effect became noticeable as sections of gray, unpainted quarry were visible at the edges of the frame which would not have been viewable on 4:3 televisions at the time of the original broadcast.

To create the impression of a buried train carriage, a depression had to be blown into the ground and thirty-two dump trucks worth of debris removed. Series creator Chris Carter makes a cameo appearance in this episode as one of the senior FBI agents questioning Scully. The tagline for this episode is Éí 'Aaníígóó 'Áhoot'é, which means "The Truth is Out There" in Navajo.

== Reception ==
It's possible to sense here, at this moment, that this as far we're going to get in terms of making sense. Mulder and Scully will keep finding new sources of information, other people will get shot, indeterminate menace will ensue, but we're never going to have this end in the way it really needs to. The outward growth here is very entertaining, but it's also a bad sign, because it's not going to stop.

— The A.V. Club's Zack Handlen on the eventual growth of the series' mythology.

"Anasazi" premiered on the Fox network on May 19, 1995. This episode earned a Nielsen rating of 10.1, with an 18 share, meaning that roughly 10.1 percent of all television-equipped households, and 18 percent of households watching television, were tuned in to the episode. It was viewed by 9.6 million households.

Chris Carter said of the episode, "I'm proud of the way it came together, what it did for the series, and the overwhelmingly positive response it has gotten. I'm very pleased beginning season three with where this episode put us—which is that it posed more questions than it answered." He later said in 2005 that the episode brought a lot of interest to the show due to the apparent death of agent Mulder.

In a retrospective of the second season in Entertainment Weekly, "Anasazi" was rated an A, being described as "mind-blowing if frustrating", with it being noted that the episode "made fans want to fast-forward through summer." Writing for The A.V. Club, Zack Handlen rated the episode an A−, noting that the episode "has a lot of really strong moments" and praising Duchovny's acting. However, he felt that the episode marked the point at which the series' overarching mythology would begin to lose focus, explaining that "it's troubling that instead of answering any big issues here ... the show only gives us new directions". The episode, along with both other parts of the story arc, were listed concurrently as the second-best episode of the series by Den of Geek's Nina Sordi. Sordi noted that the plotline "laid the groundwork for the mythology arc for the rest of the series", adding that it "brought much more significance to what is to come".

Reviewers have critiqued the treatment of indigenous peoples and culture in the episode. While writing a largely positive review of the episode, Jess Camacho of Multiversity Comics argued that "Anasazi" is "awful when it comes to dealing with Native American people, specifically their very valid conflicts with the U.S. government. It has really fallen back on some stereotypes and doesn't do very well in handling things." Likewise, Eleanor Hersey, in an article published in the Journal of Popular Film & Television argues that "The X-Files is certainly guilty of romanticizing and stereotyping the Navajo" in the episode.

Conversely, Caroline M. Woidat, in her journal article "The Truth Is on the Reservation: American Indians and Conspiracy Culture", argues that "a shared passion for revealing the government’s lies and secrets forges a common bond between Mulder and Hosteen [and this] pairing allows for pointed social critique: 'One of the most compelling aspects of the "Anasazi" arc is its representation of X-Files mythology and Navajo mythology as alternatives to the national narrative in which all traces of government misconduct and cultural genocide are always erased'."
