= The Blessing Way (The X-Files) =

- The X-Files episode
- Episode no.: Season 3 Episode 1
- Directed by: R. W. Goodwin
- Written by: Chris Carter
- Production code: 3X01
- Original air date: September 22, 1995
- Running time: 45 minutes

Guest appearances
- Mitch Pileggi as Walter Skinner; Peter Donat as William Mulder; Floyd Westerman as Albert Hosteen; Melinda McGraw as Melissa Scully; Sheila Larken as Margaret Scully; Nicholas Lea as Alex Krycek; William B. Davis as The Smoking Man; John Neville as the Well-Manicured Man; Tom Braidwood as Melvin Frohike; Rebecca Toolan as Teena Mulder; Don S. Williams as the First Elder; Lenno Britos as Luis Cardinal; Jerry Hardin as Deep Throat

Episode chronology
← Previous "Anasazi"	Next → "Paper Clip"
- The X-Files season 3

"The Blessing Way" is the first episode of the third season of the American science fiction television series The X-Files. It premiered on the Fox network on September 22, 1995. It was directed by R.W. Goodwin, and written by series creator Chris Carter. "The Blessing Way" featured guest appearances by Floyd Red Crow Westerman, Peter Donat and Jerry Hardin, and introduced John Neville as the Well-Manicured Man. The episode helped explore the overarching mythology, or fictional history of The X-Files. "The Blessing Way" earned a Nielsen household rating of 12.3, being watched by 19.94 million people in its initial broadcast. The episode received mixed-to-positive reviews from critics.

The show centers on FBI special agents Fox Mulder (David Duchovny) and Dana Scully (Gillian Anderson) who work on cases linked to the paranormal, called X-Files. In this episode, Mulder is found near death on the Navajo Reservation, and is nursed back to health by the tribe, led by Albert Hosteen (Westerman). Meanwhile, Scully investigates an implant found in her neck, and fears that her life—and those of her family—may be in danger. "The Blessing Way" is part of a three-episode story arc, carrying on from the second season finale, "Anasazi", and continuing in the next episode, "Paper Clip". The title of the episode refers to the Navajo ceremony of the Blessing Way.

Series creator Chris Carter, who called the episode one of his favorite episodes to write, created the episode as a way to explore how the character of Fox Mulder would react to the death of his father. The episode contained several elaborate special effects; effects producer Mat Beck considered the sequence where Mulder has a vision of his father and Deep Throat to be one of the most difficult of the season.

== Plot ==
In Two Grey Hills, New Mexico, Albert Hosteen (Floyd Red Crow Westerman) and his family are beaten by the Men in Black as they search for the whereabouts of Fox Mulder (David Duchovny). Dana Scully (Gillian Anderson) is pursued by a black helicopter before soldiers retrieve her printed copies of Albert's translations of the digital tape, but they cannot find the original. Scully denies having the original tape, saying it is in Mulder's possession. Upon returning to Washington, the FBI puts Scully on mandatory leave and forces her to turn in her badge and gun. Upon entering Mulder's office, she finds the tape missing.

Meanwhile, in New York City, The Smoking Man (William B. Davis) appears before the Syndicate, who question him over the whereabouts of the tape. Mulder, alive but severely wounded, is found buried under some rocks near the buried boxcar. Hosteen has Mulder taken to a Navajo sweat lodge to be healed during a "Blessing Way" ritual. During the ritual, Mulder has ghostly visions of Deep Throat and his father, who urge him to recover and continue his search for the truth.

Melvin Frohike visits Scully's apartment and shows her a newspaper article about Kenneth Soona's murder. When she returns to FBI headquarters, the metal detector curiously goes off. Scully presents Skinner with the newspaper article, thinking that the data from Soona's death can clear Mulder in his father's murder. Skinner, however, refuses to do any follow-up on it. After Scully leaves, it is revealed that the Smoking Man was waiting in an adjacent room to question Skinner about the exchange. Leaving the building, Scully has a hunch upon seeing the metal detector again that leads to locating metal in the back of her neck. Scully sees a doctor, who removes a small metal implant.

Scully's sister Melissa urges her to see a hypnotherapist to recover lost memories of her abduction. Scully does so, but becomes scared and stops the session. Returning home, she finds Skinner leaving her apartment; he later denies being there. Mulder, recovered from the ritual, is told by Hosteen that he cannot bathe or change clothes for four days. Scully attends Bill's funeral in Boston, where she introduces herself to Mulder's mother, Teena. At the cemetery, Scully is approached by a Syndicate member known as the Well-Manicured Man, who warns her that she is about to be killed, either by a pair of assassins or by someone she knows. Mulder goes to Massachusetts and questions Teena about an old photo of his father standing with the other members of the Syndicate in front of a mysterious building.

Melissa calls Scully and tells her she is coming over. After receiving a call from someone who immediately hangs up, Scully leaves her apartment and tells Melissa that she'll head to her home instead. As she leaves, Skinner pulls up in his car, telling her they need to speak in private. Melissa shows up soon afterwards and is mistakenly shot by Luis Cardinal, who is hiding there with Alex Krycek. Realizing they shot the wrong person, the two flee. Meanwhile, after taking Skinner to Mulder's apartment, Scully holds him at gunpoint, believing he is the traitor the Well-Manicured Man spoke of. Skinner tells Scully that he is in possession of the digital tape. Just then, someone steps outside the door. This distracts Scully enough for Skinner to pull his gun on her.

== Production ==
Series creator Chris Carter felt this was one of his favorite episodes to write, as he found it interesting to explore how the character of Fox Mulder would react to the death of his father. Carter had recently lost a parent himself when he began work on the episode.

Frank Spotnitz said of the episode "The expectations were very high coming after a summer's worth of anticipation to see how Mulder got out of the boxcar. We knew we had to answer that question and still leave an intriguing enough dilemma at the end of the show to bring viewers back for the third and final part. I also thought it was a big gamble to do all that Indian mysticism stuff. I thought a lot of people would not necessarily respond to that. So I was nervous about that, but very excited about the Scully storyline and the way all of that played out with Mulder and Skinner."

Carter attended Navajo chants and rituals to ensure the accuracy of the events in this episode, after being alerted to inaccuracies in the previous episode by Navajo scholars. A sand painter was brought in to create the two sand paintings for the Blessing Way sequence, which took an entire day to create. The scenes set in New Mexico were filmed in the same Vancouver quarry that had been used as a stand-in in the previous episode, "Anasazi", the repainting of which required only minor touch-ups.

Visual effects producer Mat Beck considered the sequence where Fox Mulder has a vision of Deep Throat and his father the most difficult of the season. The end of the episode reads "In Memoriam, Larry Wells, 1946 - 1995." Wells was a costume designer on the show. Mark Snow slightly changed the piano melody from the opening theme music (and the corresponding shortened theme in the credits) from the first two seasons in this episode. The music would remain unchanged for several years. This is the first episode where Mitch Pileggi is credited under Also Starring in the opening credits.

== Reception ==
=== Ratings ===
"The Blessing Way" premiered on the Fox network on September 22, 1995 The episode earned a Nielsen household rating of 12.3 with a 22 share, meaning that roughly 12.3 percent of all television-equipped households, and 22 percent of households watching television, were tuned in to the episode. A total of 19.94 million viewers watched this episode during its original airing, making it the most viewed episode of the third season.

=== Reviews ===
"The Blessing Way" received mixed reviews from critics. The episode, along with both other parts of the story arc, were listed concurrently as the second-best episode of the series by Den of Geek's Nina Sordi. Sordi noted that the plotline "laid the groundwork for the mythology arc for the rest of the series", adding that it "brought much more significance to what is to come". John Keegan, writing for Critical Myth, gave the episode a largely positive review and rated it a 10 out of 10. Keegan described it as the "perfect counterpoint to Anasazi" and a "strong beginning to the third season". Other reviews were more mixed. In an overview of the third season in Entertainment Weekly, "The Blessing Way" was rated a B+. The episode was derided for its "corny dream sequence and high-flown cosmic hooey", although the introduction of the Well-Manicured Man and Mitch Pileggi's portrayal of Walter Skinner were seen as highlights. Writing for The A.V. Club, Emily VanDerWerff panned the episode's "pseudo-mystical bullshit", rating the episode a B−. She felt that the resolution of the cliffhanger from the previous episode "Anasazi"—that of Mulder's apparent death—was poorly handled, and that the character of Albert Hosteen was perhaps the worst in the series. However, the introduction of plot threads such as Scully's implant and the alien–human hybrids were deemed positive factors.

David Duchovny was somewhat disappointed with the episode, hoping he would have had a chance to do more in an episode that was primarily a symbolic journey for him rather than a real one. The actor said "I like the psychology, and I like the thinking that went into the episode as a viewer. As an actor, I felt like an opportunity passed me by. If I had to do any episode over again, it would be that one." The actor called the episode in 1995 the greatest missed opportunity they had. Chris Carter disagreed, stating that Fox Mulder's role in the episode was the right way to do it, and that the dramatic weight for the episode had to shift from Mulder to Dana Scully.

== Bibliography ==
- Edwards, Ted (1996). X-Files Confidential. Little, Brown and Company. ISBN 0-316-21808-1.
- Gradnitzer, Louisa; Pittson, Todd (1999). X Marks the Spot: On Location with The X-Files. Arsenal Pulp Press. ISBN 1-55152-066-4.
- Lovece, Frank (1996). The X-Files Declassified. Citadel Press. ISBN 0-8065-1745-X.
- Lowry, Brian (1995). The Truth is Out There: The Official Guide to the X-Files. Harper Prism. ISBN 0-06-105330-9.
- Lowry, Brian (1996). Trust No One: The Official Guide to the X-Files. Harper Prism. ISBN 0-06-105353-8.
