= The X-Files: Original Motion Picture Score =

Soundtrack album by Mark Snow
- Released: June 2, 1998
- Genre: Soundtrack
- Label: Elektra

The X-Files: Original Motion Picture Score is the score by Mark Snow released in conjunction with the 1998 movie The X-Files.

== Track listing ==
1. "Threnody in 'X'" (contains parts of "The X-Files Theme")
2. "B.C. Blood"
3. "Goop"
4. "Soda Pop"
5. "Already Dead"
6. "Cave Base"
7. "Remnants"
8. "Fossil Swings"
9. "Plague"
10. "Goodbye Bronschweig"
11. "Call to Arms"
12. "Crossroads"
13. "Corn Hives"
14. "Corn Copters"
15. "Out of Luck"
16. "Stung Kissing/Cargo Hold"
17. "Come and Gone"
18. "Trust No One"
19. "Ice Base"
20. "Mind Games"
21. "Nightmare"
22. "Pod Monster Suite"
23. "Facts"
24. "Crater Hug"

== 2014 limited edition re-release ==
A revised, limited-edition score was released by La-La Land Records on July 29, 2014. This release featured improved sound and contained some previously unreleased pieces. Also, the incorrectly reversed stereo channels on the original soundtrack release were corrected. It was produced by Mark Snow and Nick Redman, and mastered by Mike Matessino. A total of 3000 units of this release were produced.

The tracks on the release appear in the order they were heard in the film, excepting the last two, which are alternate versions. The tracks are:

1. "Threnody in 'X'"
2. "B.C. Blood"
3. "Goop"
4. "Soda Pop"
5. "Quitting" (previously unreleased)
6. "Already Dead"
7. "Cave Base"
8. "Remnants"
9. "Plague"
10. "Fossil Swings"
11. "Goodbye Bronschweig"
12. "A Call to Arms"
13. "Elders / Crossroads" (previously unreleased)
14. "Corn Hives"
15. "Corn Copters"
16. "Out of Luck"
17. "Stung Kissing / Cargo Hold"
18. "Come and Gone"
19. "Trust No One"
20. "Ice Base"
21. "Space Hole" (previously unreleased)
22. "Mind Games"
23. "Nightmare"
24. "Pod Monster Suite"
25. "Crater Hug"
26. "Facts"
27. "Plague" (alternate segment, previously unreleased)
28. "Crossroads" (album version)

== Unreleased tracks ==
While the 2014 re-release was being produced, some additional never-released tracks were discovered. However, they were not included as part of that release. Those tracks are:

1. "Roadside Memorial"
2. "Man in the Shadows"
3. "Rooftops"
4. "Hole in the Wall"
5. "Bee Collar"
6. "Smoking Telegram"

"Roadside Memorial" and "Man in the Shadows" were never used in the film. "Smoking Telegram," the cue used in the final scene of the film, is widely considered by fans as the best piece of music in the film. One poster on the Film Score Monthly forum comments, "My understanding is that this cue was done at the very last second (as I recall the scene in question was added to the film at the last minute, I could be wrong) and Mark just knocked it out at his studio and sent it over to the dub stage and that DAT or D-88 has vanished in the last 16 years. He didn't have a copy in his archive either. It happens." Another poster writes, "Initially there was NO music in that scene. Last minute, Carter asked Snow to compose something so they can slap it in the film. He went to his piano and hammered something out and sent it in. That story comes directly from Mr. Snow himself during a conversation I had with him many months ago. Of all people who is bummed it can't be found it's him. Maybe one day it will turn up, but after spending nearly 2 years looking for it (even going through each of his personal DATS dated within a year of the film and tv scores) we had to end the search."

"Smoking Telegram" was eventually released as a track on La-La Land Records' fourth volume of music from the X-Files television series.
