= Well-Manicured Man =

Fictional character from the X-Files franchise

- The X-Files character
- First appearance: "The Blessing Way"
- Last appearance: The X-Files
- Created by: Chris Carter
- Portrayed by: John Neville
- Duration: 1995—98

In-universe information
- Gender: Male
- Nationality: British
- Affiliated with: The Syndicate
- Status: Deceased

The Well-Manicured Man is a fictional character in the American science fiction television series The X-Files. He serves as an antagonist to FBI special agents Fox Mulder (David Duchovny) and Dana Scully (Gillian Anderson), being a member of the sinister Syndicate the agents seek to foil. Introduced in the third season, the Well-Manicured Man served to highlight discord within the ranks of the Syndicate, and ultimately betrayed them by leaking information to Mulder before committing suicide in the series' first feature film.

The Well-Manicured Man was portrayed by John Neville in all of the character's appearances (eight episodes, and the feature film). According to the series' writers, the character represents a non-violent "voice of reason" amongst the series' antagonists. Neville's portrayal of the Well-Manicured Man has been positively received by critics, who have noted his "moral ambivalence" and "unnervingly genteel" manner.

== Character arc ==
Introduced at the beginning of the third season, the Well-Manicured Man is a British member of the Syndicate, a shadow organization within the United States government that exists to hide from the public the fact that aliens are planning to colonize the Earth. He is an important member of the Syndicate, along with The Smoking Man (William B. Davis) and The Elder, and was a friend of William Mulder earlier in his life.

The Well-Manicured Man prefers subtlety to brute force, and will attempt to manipulate those in his way before using physical violence. Although the Syndicate's goals are opposed to those of Fox Mulder (David Duchovny) and Dana Scully (Gillian Anderson), the Well-Manicured Man will, at times, aid them with clues or information, believing that letting out a certain amount of information would help to keep the two close, and consequently allow for them to be controlled. The Well-Manicured Man openly despises The Smoking Man, seeing him as impulsive and unprofessional. The two maintain a bitter relationship within the Syndicate throughout the series. The Well-Manicured Man is instrumental in the Syndicate's secondary agenda, to develop a vaccination against the black oil used by the aliens as a means of mind control. To this end, he works with Russian double agent Alex Krycek (Nicholas Lea) to develop a vaccine, eventually testing it—successfully—on a Syndicate mole, Marita Covarrubias (Laurie Holden).

In the 1998 feature film The X-Files, when Scully is infected with the black oil and taken to Antarctica, it is the Well-Manicured Man who, having grown disillusioned with the Syndicate, gives Mulder the coordinates needed to find her and a sample of the vaccine needed to cure Scully. The colonists had kept secret a secondary characteristic of the black oil—that those infected with it for prolonged periods would gestate a new colonist lifeform, killing the host. Upon discovering this, the Syndicate vowed to work more closely with the colonists in the hope of being spared this fate, while only the Well-Manicured Man wished to continue working on a vaccination for resistance. This rejection led to his betrayal of the Syndicate, and to him committing suicide by car bomb before his duplicity was discovered.

== Conceptual history ==
John Neville has stated that he was originally hired for just two episodes of the series, but that his character "was regularly brought back, because the audience simply doesn't know if he stands for good or evil". Series creator Chris Carter has described the character in terms of his relationship with the Cigarette Smoking Man, noting that the two characters can be seen as "differing in approach, differing in philosophy and differing in personality". Writer Frank Spotnitz has described the Well-Manicured Man as "sort of the white knight to the Cigarette-Smoking Man's black knight in this chess game that we were playing".

The character has also been described by Carter and Spotnitz as the "voice of reason" within the Syndicate, who "believes that violence is the wrong way to protect the secret" which they guard. The Well-Manicured Man's suicide scene in the series' film adaptation went through several conceptual iterations, with outcomes being considered including an imploding car or suicide by concussion grenade, although ultimately a car bomb scene was decided upon.

== Reception ==
The character of the Well-Manicured Man has been positively received by critics. MTV's Tami Katzoff has called him a "legendary TV character", noting his "moral ambivalence about the work of his shadow organization" and his ability to show "empathy for Mulder and Scully". Writing for The A.V. Club, Sean O'Neal praised the character's "unnervingly genteel" manner, noting that he represented the polar opposite of the Cigarette Smoking Man. Fellow A.V. Club writer Emily VanDerWerff has also been positive towards the Well-Manicured Man, feeling that the series would have benefited from making more use of the character. The San Francisco Chronicle's Bob Graham has praised Neville's portrayal of the character in the feature film, calling his expository monologue "a Wagnerian demonstration of the art of declamation". Writing for the Los Angeles Daily News, Michael Liedtke and George Avalos described the character as "white-haired, urbane, genteel[—]and dangerous", noting that he was "equally at ease in Virginia's horse country, the tony rooms of Manhattan's Upper West Side and the antiseptic halls of facilities that house bizarre medical experiments". Den of Geek's countdown of "The Top 10 X-Files Baddies" described the Well-Manicured Man as a "super-smooth, super-creep Brit", noting that he served as "a 'boss' of sorts" for the Smoking Man. Speaking of how the role eclipsed his other acting work, Neville has been quoted as saying "It's OK, though. [The X-Files] gave me a kind of profile that I didn't have before, and one shouldn't grumble about that".
