= Cigarette Smoking Man =

Character in The X-Files

Carl Gerhard Busch "Cigarette Smoking Man"
- The X-Files character
- William B. Davis as the Cigarette Smoking Man
- First appearance: "Pilot" (September 10, 1993)
- Last appearance: "My Struggle IV" (March 21, 2018)
- Created by: Chris Carter
- Portrayed by: William B. Davis; Chris Owens (younger); Craig Warkentin (younger)

In-universe information
- Occupation: Department of Defense; Syndicate member; Men in Black Case Officer; Assassin
- Family: Cassandra (ex-wife); Jeffrey Spender (son); Fox Mulder (son)
- Alias: C.G.B. Spender
- Affiliated with: Colonists; Central Intelligence Agency; National Security Agency; Federal Bureau of Investigation, The X-Files; The Syndicate
- Duration: 1993–2000, 2002, 2016–2018
- Films: The X-Files

The Cigarette Smoking Man (abbreviated CSM or C-Man; sometimes referred to as Cancer Man or the Smoking Man) is a fictional character and one of the primary antagonists of the American science fiction drama television series The X-Files. He serves as the arch-nemesis of FBI Special Agent Fox Mulder. In the show's sixth season, his name is said to be C.G.B. Spender, but Dana Scully suggests this is one of "hundreds of aliases"; the show's characters and fans continue to refer to him by variations of "the Smoking Man" because he is almost always seen chain-smoking Morley cigarettes, and because he was credited in the pilot episode and other episodes (such as the season 1 finale) as "Smoking Man". In the eleventh season, his soliloquy reveals his full birth name to be Carl Gerhard Busch, though whether he has any meaningful "real" identity in his later life outside of the Smoking Man persona is unclear.

Although he utters only four audible words in the entire first season of the show, the Smoking Man eventually develops into the series' primary antagonist. In his early appearances, he is seen in the offices of Section Chief Scott Blevins and Assistant Director Walter Skinner, Mulder and his partner Dana Scully's supervisors. An influential man working for the powers that be, he is a key member in a government-conspiracy unit known only as the Syndicate, who are hiding the truth of alien existence and their plan to colonize Earth. His power and influence remain strong, even after most of the Syndicate is destroyed.

The Smoking Man is portrayed by Canadian actor William B. Davis. When Davis first took the role, the character was written as an extra for the pilot episode. He returned for small cameo appearances during the first season, making increasingly more appearances in the seasons that followed. Davis never received an award for his portrayal alone, but he was nominated for ensemble awards.

TV Guide included him in their 2013 list of The 60 Nastiest Villains of All Time.

== Character arc ==
=== Backstory ===
The birth date, birthplace, and most of the history of the Smoking Man are never categorically confirmed. One possible version of his past is provided during the fourth-season episode "Musings of a Cigarette Smoking Man", in which the conspiracy theorists known as The Lone Gunmen claim Smoking Man was first documented in Baton Rouge, Louisiana, on August 20, 1940. His father was an ardent communist activist and a spy for the Soviet NKVD who was executed under the Espionage Act of 1917 "before his boy could walk". His mother was a cigarette smoker who died from lung cancer, also when he was an infant. Since he had no surviving family, he became a ward of the state and was sent to various orphanages in the Midwestern United States. He made no friends and spent most of his time reading. This episode contradicts the season 3 episode "Apocrypha" where young Smoking Man was seen in 1953 with Bill Mulder (Fox Mulder's father) as already a shadowy agent and smoking. "Musings of a Cigarette Smoking Man" has the Smoking Man still a young man and not part of the Syndicate in 1963, and he does not smoke yet.

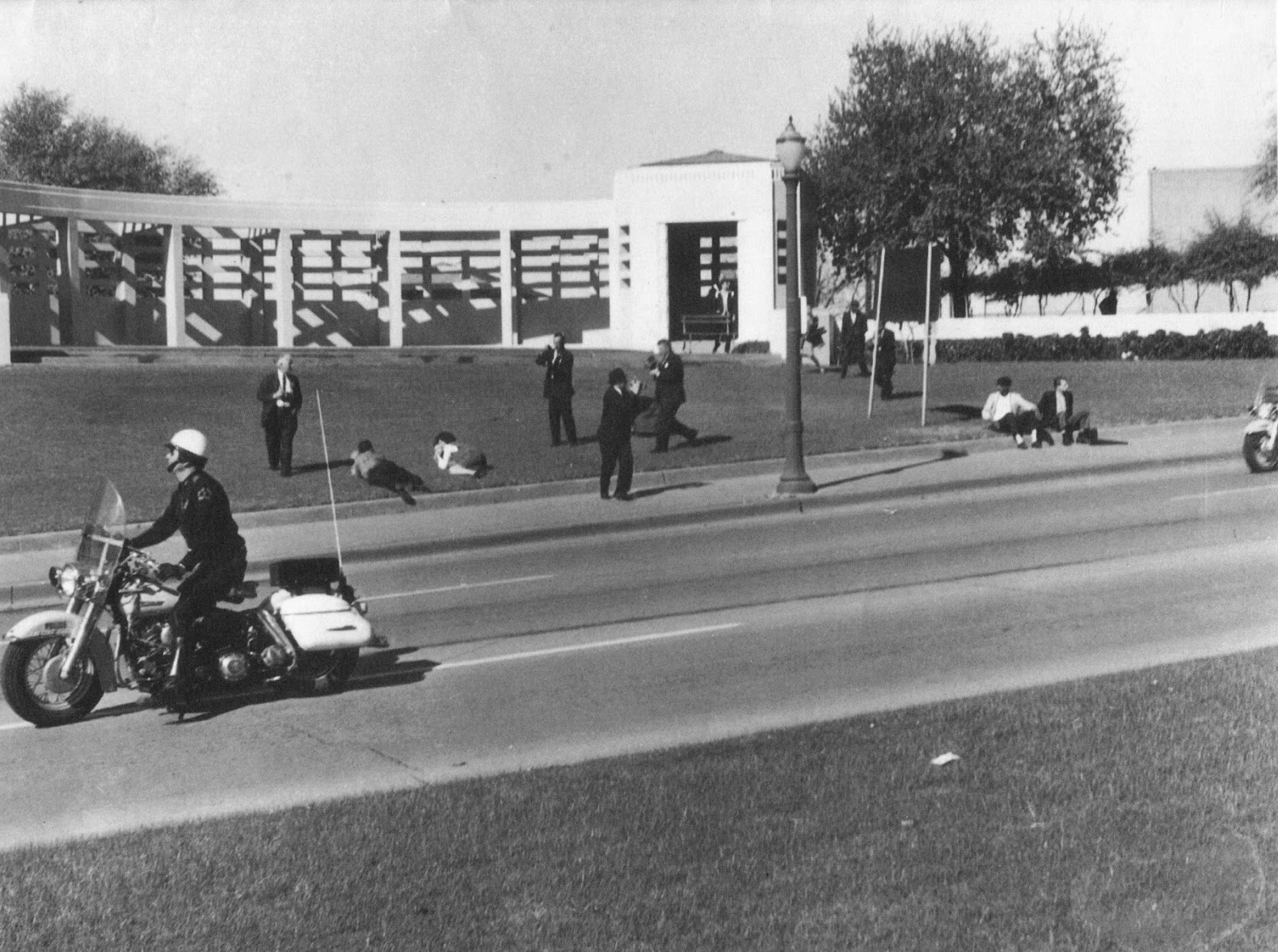
The episode portrays the Smoking Man shooting John F. Kennedy after being signaled by the "Umbrella man" (sitting on the right side).

The same episode reveals that by the early 1960s he was a United States Army Special Forces captain involved in black operations and intelligence, and that he served alongside Bill Mulder. The Smoking Man was already involved in the assassinations of Patrice Lumumba and Rafael Trujillo along with the CIA-backed failed invasion of Cuba before being enlisted by a secret cabal to assassinate President John F. Kennedy in Dallas, Texas. The assassination was motivated by Kennedy's mishandling of the Bay of Pigs Invasion and the subsequent Cuban Missile Crisis. As part of the mission, the Smoking Man told the designated patsy, Lee Harvey Oswald, to bring the curtain rods as a way to frame him for the murder. By 1968, the Smoking Man had progressed enough in the hierarchy to push himself for the assassination of Martin Luther King Jr., concerned that King was "talking like a Maoist" and a threat to the American war effort in Vietnam. He did the deed himself because he had "too much respect for the man," and chose to frame a white man because of his own sympathy for the American civil rights movement.

At the same time, the Smoking Man was an aspiring writer of espionage (and later, science fiction) novels starring a fictional version of himself called Jack Colquitt, based on his own secret activities, but all his drafts were rejected or altered by publishers who found them unrealistic and poorly written. This left him no choice but to continue working for the United States government. By 1991, the Smoking Man's power was pretty much absolute. He was in direct talks with Saddam Hussein and involved in one way or another on the Anita Hill–Clarence Thomas controversy, moving the Rodney King trial to Simi Valley, California, keeping the United States government from interfering in the independence of Bosnia and Herzegovina, the Academy Awards nominations, keeping the Buffalo Bills from ever winning the Super Bowl, drugging the Soviet goalkeeper Vladislav Tretiak before the Miracle on Ice, and executing extraterrestrials that survived landing on American soil.

Nevertheless, X-Files writer Frank Spotnitz stated that this version of events is only one possibility and is not accepted canon.

In the eleventh-season episode "My Struggle III," the Cigarette-Smoking Man reveals his name to be Carl Gerhard Busch (the name of series creator Chris Carter's grandfather). In this backstory, he is shown to have been active back sometime after the Roswell incident and oversaw an experiment on a grey alien. These events preceded the Syndicate, with this new origin retconning the original series run by claiming that the Smoking Man was in fact playing against the Syndicate, despite having previously being seen taking orders from them. He is also confirmed to be the real killer of John F. Kennedy and is seen being present during the faking of the Moon Landing in 1969.

=== Main arc ===
In his first appearance in the series in the Pilot, he oversees FBI agent Dana Scully's (Gillian Anderson) briefing and debriefing, and later disposes of evidence Fox Mulder (David Duchovny) and Scully had brought back from their investigation of an alien abduction. With the Smoking Man hiding truth from the public, Mulder seeks to reveal it to the public and the truth about the disappearance of his sister, Samantha. This leads to a rivalry that lasts until the end of the series.

In later seasons, it is revealed that he is a member of a group known as the Syndicate, a shadowy organization within the United States government. The episode "Two Fathers" reveals his birth name or alias as C.G.B. Spender, and that he was formerly married to Cassandra Spender, with whom he had a son, Jeffrey Spender. He recruits FBI Special Agent Diana Fowley to be a subordinate of his because she has a close relationship with Mulder. In "One Son", Jeffrey finds out that his father, the Smoking Man, forced his mother Cassandra to undergo medical treatments that led to several nervous breakdowns during his childhood years. When the Smoking Man finds out, he seemingly kills Jeffrey. Knowing of the colonization plan, the Alien rebels return to Earth to try to persuade the Syndicate to join their side against their war with the Colonists. Not believing in the strength of the Alien rebels, the Syndicate members meet at El Rico Air Base to be transported to a spaceship to survive the colonization. However, the rebels appear instead of the Colonists and kill all remaining chief members of the Syndicate. Together with Fowley, the Smoking Man escapes the destruction of the Syndicate. Later in the sixth season, there is more evidence that suggested that the Smoking Man is Mulder's biological father. Eventually in "The Sixth Extinction II: Amor Fati", Smoking Man tells Mulder, "I am your father," while Mulder has a flashback to his childhood of walking on the beach with his parents. Fowley comes in disagreement with him. Because of his plans to kill Mulder, Fowley helps Scully in her investigation to locate Mulder, which leads to her death. After the destruction of the Syndicate, the Smoking Man starts to operate as he wishes. However, his cancer resurfaces, and he begins using a wheelchair and has a tracheotomy. In the end, Alex Krycek and Marita Covarrubias betray him in the episode "Requiem", throwing him down a flight of stairs, where they presume him to be dead.

The Smoking Man is revealed to be alive in the ninth season episode "William", where it is also learned that his attempted murder of his son failed, which led him to subject his son to terrible experiments. In the series finale, "The Truth", Mulder and Scully travel through remote New Mexico and reach a pueblo where a "wise man" reputedly lives: he is, in fact, the Smoking Man. His condition has worsened since his disappearance, and he lives a primitive life in hiding from the "New" Syndicate. After taunting Mulder and Scully, he reveals to Scully what Mulder already knew, that the alien re-colonization of Earth is set for December 22, 2012. Shortly after, Smoking Man is again apparently killed by a rocket shot from a helicopter ordered by Knowle Rohrer.

For the next 14 years, he is presumed dead. However, he appears again alive, but seriously burned and disfigured at the end of "My Struggle" (2016), the first episode of the X-Files miniseries, stating that the X-Files have been reopened. In the season finale, "My Struggle II", the Smoking Man puts into motion the conspiracy he had been working on all these years, releasing chemtrails into the atmosphere which trigger immune system breakdowns throughout the American population, which had been infected by the Spartan virus through mandatory flu vaccinations. Out of fondness for Mulder, he offers him the cure to the disease, but is rebuffed. The United States is thrown into chaos as the Syndicate plan for depopulation gets underway. However, in "My Struggle III", this is shown to be a vision experienced by Scully. It is revealed that the Smoking Man is trying to find Scully's son William in order to fulfill his plans, and that he is in conflict with a group led by two other surviving Syndicate members, who want the Smoking Man dead in order to carry out their own agenda. The Smoking Man approaches Walter Skinner to make him a deal, and offers him a chance to survive the end of humanity in exchange for Skinner helping him find William. The Smoking Man also reveals he was responsible for the creation of William, as he impregnated Scully with the use of alien technology.

In the season 11 finale "My Struggle IV", the Smoking Man and Reyes follow Mulder, Scully and Skinner to an abandoned factory where they are chasing down William. Skinner points a gun at them and shoots Reyes dead, and the Smoking Man runs Skinner over in his car. The Smoking Man confronts "Mulder" (who is actually William in disguise) by a waterfront, and during the standoff shoots him in the head and causes him to fall into the water. The real Mulder appears and shoots the Smoking Man, who realizes that he has killed William, and he falls off the edge and into the water, with his body then carried away by the current.

== Appearances in episodes ==
- Season 1: "Pilot", "Young at Heart", "Tooms", "The Erlenmeyer Flask"
- Season 2: "Little Green Men", "Sleepless", "Ascension", "One Breath", "F. Emasculata", "Anasazi"
- Season 3: "The Blessing Way", "Paper Clip", "731", "Apocrypha", "Avatar", "Wetwired", "Talitha Cumi"
- Season 4: "Herrenvolk", "Musings of a Cigarette Smoking Man", "Tunguska", "Terma", "Memento Mori", "Zero Sum"
- Season 5: "Redux", "Patient X", "The Red and the Black", "The End"
- Season 6: "The Beginning", "S.R. 819", "Two Fathers", "One Son", "Biogenesis"
- Season 7: "The Sixth Extinction II: Amor Fati", "Closure", "En Ami", "Requiem"
- Season 8: No appearances
- Season 9: "The Truth"
- Season 10: "My Struggle", "My Struggle II"
- Season 11: "My Struggle III", "Ghouli", "My Struggle IV"

== Spin-off media ==
Prior to the tenth televised series of The X-Files in 2016, Chris Carter worked with IDW Publishing in 2013 to produce a comic-book continuation of the show. It hints that the Smoking Man is alive and indirectly feeding information to both Mulder and The Lone Gunmen. Carter later said that the story from these comics would be disregarded in future television productions. A variation of the comic-book continuation was made canonical with The X-Files: Cold Cases, an Audible adaptation of the series set between the events of the ninth and tenth seasons of The X-Files, in which the Smoking Man presented in the series is revealed to be a shape-shifting alien imitating him.

== Characterization ==
Kim Manners, a director of several X-Files episodes, said that the Smoking Man was the show's version of Darth Vader. Some X-Files fans have categorized the Smoking Man as evil, making him out to be the villain. Series creator Chris Carter once called him "the devil", producing a mixed reaction among fans.

The Smoking Man is involved in the Syndicate, a shadow organization which includes members of the United States government that exists to hide from the public the fact that aliens are planning to colonize Earth. The Smoking Man often ruthlessly protects the secrets of the conspiracy, and serves as the main antagonist to Mulder, who has an equally consuming devotion to reveal the truth in the first seven seasons. His stated justification is a desire to prevent the alien colonization for as long as possible; in the episode "One Breath", he tells Mulder that he is in the conspiracy (which he calls "the game") because he believes that the secrets he keeps could, if publicly revealed, threaten the social order that preserves society: "If people were to know of the things that I know... it would all fall apart". He is at times shown working towards that goal, particularly in connection with developing a vaccine to protect people from the "black oil", a parasitic agent which the alien Colonists use to propagate themselves.

== Development ==
"I tried to put myself in the character's shoes and see the world from his point of view. After all, many villains don't think they are villains".
— William B. Davis talking about his character.

When first cast for the role, portraying actor William B. Davis thought a show about the paranormal would not last for long. Before joining The X-Files cast, Davis had not smoked a cigarette in twenty years. For the first two episodes he appeared in, he smoked "real" cigarettes, but later changed to herbal cigarettes, giving the reason that smoking was dangerous for his health. In at least one early script draft from the "Pilot", a Special Agent named Lake Drazen is present at the meeting near the start of the episode, having chosen Scully for an assignment to evaluate the validity of Mulder's work on the X-Files. The scene was eventually deleted and replaced, and several crew members have hinted that Agent Drazen became the Smoking Man.

Kim Manners said that it seemed all the prominent pieces created for The X-Files were created by "accident". According to Manners, Davis was nothing more than an extra leaning on a shelf. At the start, the producers of the show were not sure about making the Smoking Man the main antagonist. Paul Rabwin commented once that he did not know if Davis could handle the role, because he was not sure if he was a "good enough" actor for the role. Manners later commented that Davis knew that the Smoking Man had two different characters, the first being the one played by Davis and the second was the cigarettes. He further stated that the cigarette smoke could tell a "whole story" by itself, thanks to Davis's talent.

Fans of the series were active in debating if the Smoking Man was actually dead after the events of the season five premiere "Redux". In his first response, Chris Carter said he had left clues in the episode, and he later officially announced that the character would appear in the X-Files movie. In one of his last comments on the matter, he said, "Not that we haven't brought deceased characters back before, in flashbacks or more paranormal ways. The great thing about The X-Files is that anything can happen."

The Smoking Man is the only character in the series, in addition to Mulder and Scully, to appear in both the first episode, "Pilot" and the original series finale, "The Truth". Portraying actor William B. Davis was listed as CIA Agent in the first season episode"Young at Heart", instead of his usual character, the Smoking Man. Chris Owens for a time portrayed the Smoking Man as a young man in flashbacks. He later plays his son, Jeffrey Spender. Young Cigarette Smoking Man was first played by Craig Warkentin, with Davis' voice dubbed over in "Apocrypha".

The character was partly inspired by E. Howard Hunt (1918 - 2007), a CIA operative who was allegedly involved in a range of major conspiracies during the mid-20th century, and who also published a series of espionage novels under multiple pen names.

The Smoking Man may have inspired the portrayal of the video game series Half-Life's overarching antagonist, the G-Man. Similarities between the two have been pointed out, such as the mysterious, enigmatic nature they share, the references to smoking present in Half-Life: Alyx, and spoken lines themselves, G-Man's infamous line "Prepare for unforeseen consequences" bearing a slight resemblance to the Smoking Man's line "There have been unforeseen events".

== Reception ==
While not being nominated for any of his work alone on The X-Files, William B. Davis and several other cast members were nominated in the category "Outstanding Performance by an Ensemble in a Drama Series" by the Screen Actors Guild Awards in 1997, 1998 and 1999, but did not win. The character was regularly voted "The Nastiest Villain" on television polls during the '90s. TV Guide listed Cigarette Smoking Man 20th in their "25 Greatest TV Villains" list. According to the portraying actor, the character had garnered protest from "pro-smokers". Entertainment Weekly writer Jennifer Armstrong cited the character as an example of the old tradition of having only "bad guys" smoking on television.

Davis was included in Entertainment Weekly's list of the 50 Biggest Emmy Snubs, the list's author saying that the presence of the "Cigarette Smoking Man" was as important as "black oil, alien implants, and Scully's skepticism". The Malaysian newspaper the New Straits Times called the Smoking Man one of the most "intriguing" characters of the show. However, Christianity Today said that the mystery behind the Smoking Man had evaporated by the late season episodes. Likewise, Ken Tucker from Entertainment Weekly felt that "the monotonous evil of Cancer Man" had "become actively annoying" in later seasons of the show, being that his lurking presence did not seem as mysterious anymore. Salon reviewer Jeff Stark felt the show was at its best when you "didn't exactly know the motivations of the Smoking Man".

The character was parodied/pastiched as an alien in the final episode of the Babylon 5 spinoff Crusade, "Visitors From Down the Street"; as similar alien pastiches of Scully and Mulder are taken away on an elevator, the Scully character shouts "The truth is out...!" The CM character ends with "of fashion.", and lights a cigarette with a smile.
