= William B. Davis =

Canadian actor (born 1938)

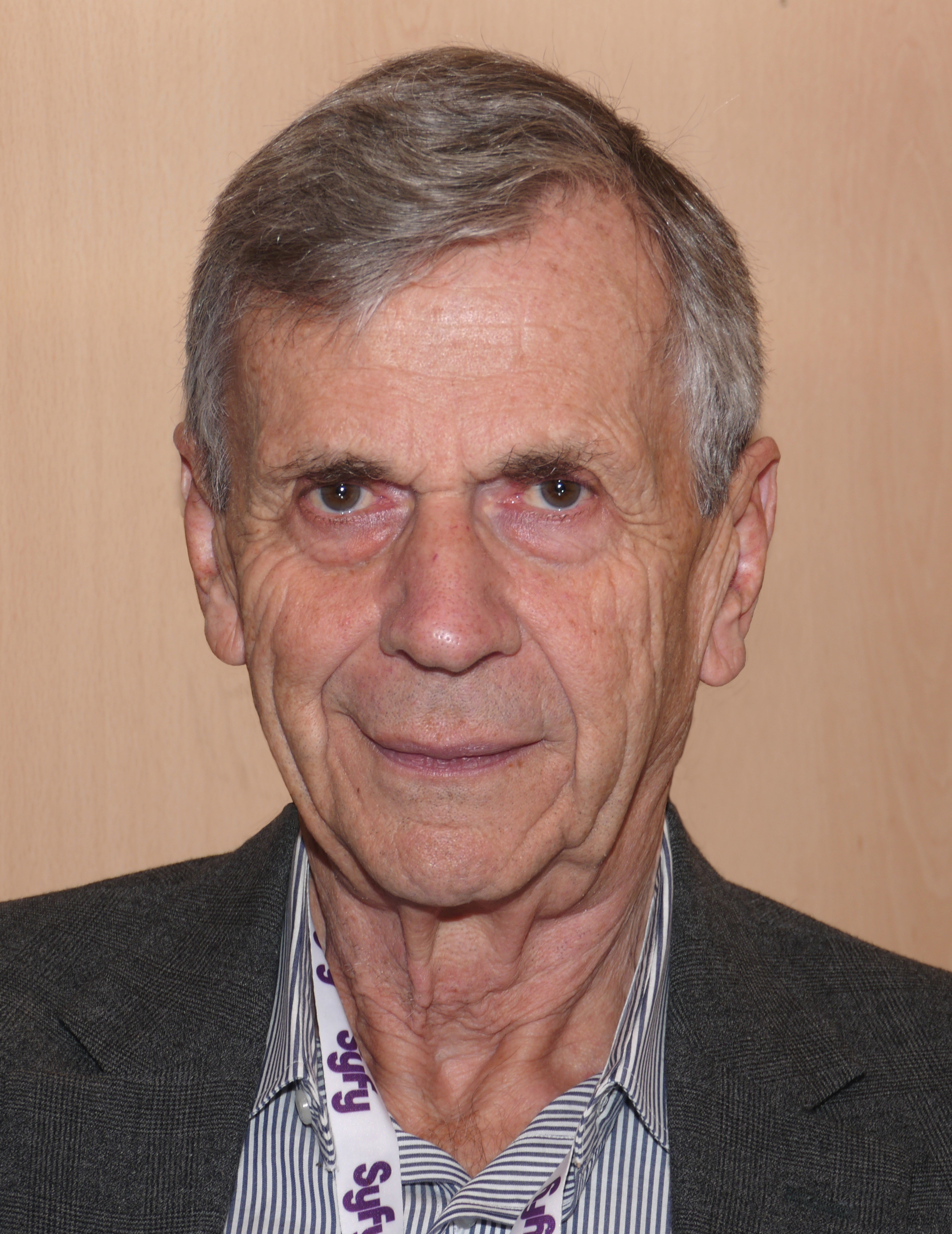
- Davis in 2011
- Born: William Bruce Davis; January 14, 1938 (age 88); Toronto, Ontario, Canada
- Occupation: Actor
- Years active: 1949–present
- Spouse: Emmanuelle Herpin (m. 2011)
- Children: 2
- Website: williambdavis.com

William Bruce Davis (born January 14, 1938) is a Canadian actor, best known for his role as the Cigarette Smoking Man on The X-Files. Besides appearing in many TV programs and movies, he founded his own acting school, the William Davis Centre for Actors Study. In 2011, he published his memoir, Where There's Smoke ... The Musings of a Cigarette Smoking Man.

== Early life and education ==
Davis was born in Toronto to a lawyer father and psychologist mother. In 1949, he began his acting career as a child, in radio drama and summer stock theatre. His cousins Murray and Donald Davis ran the Straw Hat Players in Ontario in the late 1940s and early 1950s, and rehearsed in the basement of Davis's house. When they needed a boy, they gave William his first professional acting job. He subsequently became a boy actor on Canadian Broadcasting Corporation (CBC) radio before his voice broke.

In 1955, he enrolled at University College in the University of Toronto to study philosophy, but actively pursued an acting career, as did his friend Donald Sutherland.

In 1959, he graduated from the University of Toronto with a Bachelor of Arts degree in philosophy. While at university, he switched his attention from acting to directing and with his partner, Karl Jaffary, ran the Straw Hat Players for four years.

== Career ==
In 1960, Davis went to England to train at the London Academy of Music and Dramatic Art. He worked in the UK for the next five years directing in repertory theatres and acting schools. He was artistic director of the Dundee Repertory Theatre. His last position in the UK was as an assistant director at the National Theatre of Great Britain under Laurence Olivier where he worked with Albert Finney, Maggie Smith, Derek Jacobi and Ronald Pickup among others.

In 1965, he returned to Canada to work at the National Theatre School of Canada. At the age of 28, was appointed artistic director of the English acting section. During this period he was also active as a freelance director at major Canadian theatres. In 1971, he joined the newly formed drama department at Bishop's University in Lennoxville, Quebec. While there, he became the founding artistic director of Festival Lennoxville, a professional summer theatre that ran for the next decade.

Returning to Toronto in the late seventies, Davis spent several years as a radio drama director and on the faculty of Humber College. In demand as an acting teacher during this period, he resumed acting after an absence of nearly 20 years. He earned a number of roles on stage and film before accepting the position of artistic director of the Vancouver Playhouse Acting School, which required relocating with his wife and family. Davis writes in his memoir, "And so, in the fall of 1985, we hitched our second hand boat to our second hand car and drove across the country."

While his time at the Vancouver Playhouse was short-lived, he remained in Vancouver, where he founded his own acting school, the William Davis Centre for Actors Study, a training ground for several future stars including New Zealand actress Lucy Lawless. Acting roles became more frequent, leading up to his iconic role as the Cigarette Smoking Man, also called the "Cancer Man", on the hit TV series The X-Files, where he made frequent appearances for the next nine years. Davis has also had a wide range of roles in other series, including Stargate SG-1 and Smallville, and has participated in a host of television movies and other projects. Occasionally, he attends fan conventions, signing autographs and copies of his memoir.

In recent years, Davis has returned to directing theatre and film. He wrote and directed three short films, and co-wrote and directed several episodes of a television series for CBC Television, 49th & Main. In 2011, he directed two plays for The United Players of Vancouver: Waste by Harley Granville Barker, and Hay Fever by Noël Coward. Most recently he directed The Habit of Art (2013) by Alan Bennett, Sherlock Holmes and the Case of the Jersey Lily (2015) by Katie Forgette, and Robert Bolt's A Man for All Seasons at the Jericho Arts Centre in Vancouver, British Columbia.

During that period, he appeared in 10 episodes of the Canadian hit show Continuum as Older Alec Sadler on Showcase. Most recently, he reprised his iconic X-Files role in the six-episode tenth season.^{[17]}

== Personal life ==
Despite being known for his smoking character, Davis quit smoking in the 1970s. When The X-Files started, he was given a choice between herbal cigarettes and tobacco cigarettes. While opting for tobacco at first, he switched to herbal cigarettes due to the fear he may become addicted to them again. He used his notoriety on the show to assist the Canadian Cancer Society in its programs to combat smoking.

In 2014, he donated his investments that supported fossil fuels to the David Suzuki Foundation to help combat climate change and invest in a way he found more ethical. He is an advocate for action in response to climate change and often speaks on the subject, believing it a critical issue of our time. He drives a Tesla.

He is a former national champion water skier, and for a time held records in older age divisions. In a 2008 conversation with Brendan Beiser, he said he held the record for tricks in his age category, adding: "I did hold the slalom record until this past year until some young whippersnapper of 65 from Ontario took the record away from me."

In 2011, Davis married Emmanuelle Herpin. He has two daughters, Melinda and Rebecca, from an earlier marriage, and two grandchildren.

== Skepticism ==
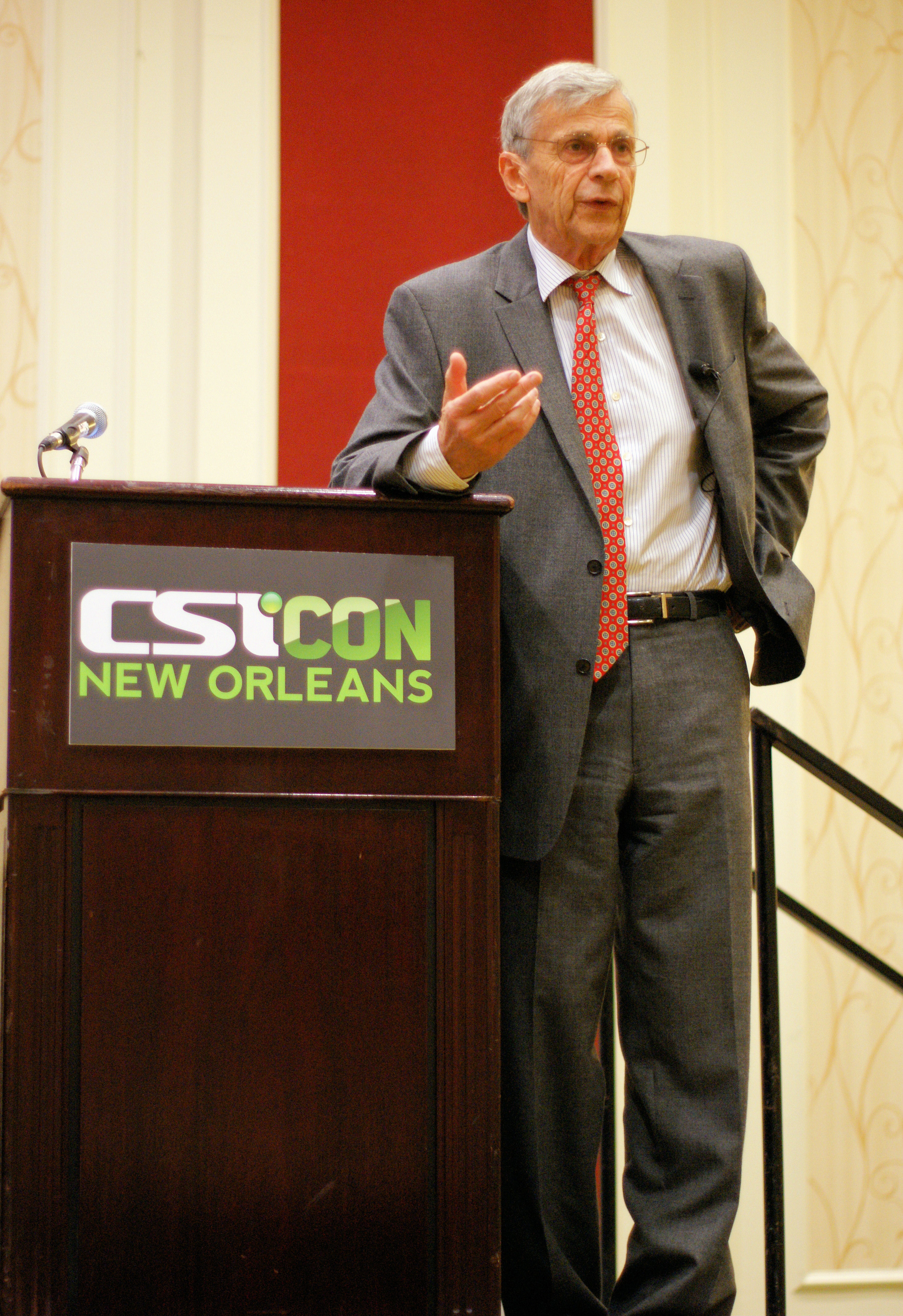
Davis participating in "Skepticism and the Media" panel at CSICon 2011 in New Orleans

While on The X-Files, Davis was constantly challenged by fans of the show about his non-belief in the paranormal and aliens. Davis credits Barry Beyerstein and the Committee for Skeptical Inquiry (CSI) for introducing him to the skeptic community. Davis became increasingly involved in the skeptic movement and began to give lectures as a skeptic spokesman at universities across North America and at skeptic conventions, including CSI's CSICon in New Orleans.

When asked about his belief in the paranormal at the London Film and Comic Con in 2010, Davis replied, "The onus is on you to prove the extraordinary ... I did a lot of research and saw where a lot of the arguments were wanting."

Interviewed by Jacob Fortin on guilt about being a skeptic, yet acting in a show that Richard Dawkins campaigned against, Davis replied that at first he had some trepidation until realizing that Dawkins "had no evidence whatsoever and presented none" that the show encouraged people to think uncritically. "The show is fiction ... it isn't a documentary." In another interview with Justin Trottier of the Centre for Inquiry Canada, Davis answered similarly, adding that from his own informal polls of audiences of X-Files fans, it seemed there was no greater belief in the paranormal than the normal population, and he comforted himself with this thought.

Asked about a debate Davis moderated with alien abduction believer John E. Mack, Davis said that many people expected him to support Mack, but they discovered that he was "way on the other side". Davis recounted that he had some great discussions with Mack; "He was brilliant ... he was wrong, but he was very good ... One of the problems with human intelligence is that we are so good at defending ideas that we arrived at irrationally."

In 2002, Davis narrated a Discovery Science Channel docuseries, The Critical Eye. Produced in association with Skeptical Inquirer magazine, the series examined pseudoscientific and paranormal phenomena.

== Filmography ==
=== Film ===
Year	Title	Role	Notes
1983	The Dead Zone	Ambulance Driver	
1985	Head Office	University Dean	
1989	Beyond the Stars	Hal Simon	
1989	Look Who's Talking	Drug Doctor	
1991	The Hitman	Dr. Atkins	
1995	Dangerous Intentions	Group Leader	
1996	Unforgettable	Dr. Smoot	
1998	The X-Files	The Smoking Man	
1998	The Last Tzaddik	Mr. Drazien	Short film
2000	Perpetrators of the Crime	Henderson	
2001	The Proposal	Agent Frank Gruning	
2001	Out of Line	Russell	
2001	Mindstorm	Parish	
2001	Jay and Silent Bob Strike Back	The Smoking Man	Uncredited
2001	Anthrax	Tye Crow	
2002	Polished	Phillip	Short film
2002	Aftermath	Deputy Director Edwards	
2002	Body & Soul	Dr. Edward A. Esseff	
2003	Broken Saints	Benjamin Palmer	
2003	Arbor Vitae	Old Soul	Short film
2004	Snakehead Terror	Doc Jenkins	
2004	Lyon King	Finance Minister	Short film
2004	Packing Up	Jenkins	Short film
2005	The Cost of Living	Mark Mortinson	Short film
2005	The Last Round	Mitchell	
2005	Max Rules	Rick Brinkley	
2006	The Janitors	Harvey	Short film
2006	Sisters	Dr. Bryant	
2007	The Messengers	Colby Price	
2007	Numb	Peter Milbank	
2008	The Femme Fatale	Sam	Video short film
2008	A Pickle	Mack	Short film
2008	Passengers	Jack	
2008	Reverse	Chris	Short film
2009	Possession	Dr. Creane	
2009	The Shortcut	Benjamin Hartley	
2009	The Thaw	Ted	
2009	Damage	Veltz	
2010	Blob	The Boss	Short film
2010	Flowers for Norma	Older Gentleman #2	Short film
2010	Amazon Falls	Calvin	
2011	Goose on the Loose	Alphonse David	
2011	Rise of the Damned	Doctor	
2012	The Tall Man	Sheriff Chestnut	
2012	The Package	Dr. Willhelm	
2013	Singularity Principle	Lawrence Cason	
2014	Focus	Mr. Grant	
2016	Residue	Lamont	
2016	Abduct	Zane	
2016	2BR02B: To Be or Naught to Be	Granddad	Short film
2017	Death Note	Radio Host	
2018	Game Over, Man!	Ray Security	
2018	Bad Times at the El Royale	Judge Gordon Hoffman	
2019	Phil	Father Grant	
2019	Crystal's Shadow	Zane Mcallister	
TBA	Villain	Lamont	Rumored

=== Television films ===
Year	Title	Role	Notes
1985	The Cuckoo Bird	Ted	
1987	Deadly Deception	Lawyer	
1987	Sworn to Silence	Peter Massio	
1987	The Little Match Girl	Dr. Sam Easton	
1989	Matinee	Heath Harris	
1990	Anything to Survive	Dr. Reynolds	
1990	It	Mr. Gedreau	
1991	Omen IV: The Awakening	Lawyer	Uncredited
1992	Diagnosis Murder	Marvin Parkins	
1994	Heart of a Child	Vern	
1994	Beyond Suspicion	Capt. Dick Roth	
1994	Don't Talk to Strangers	Huddleston	
1995	Not Our Son	Police Chief	Uncredited
1995	Circumstances Unknown	Gene Reuschel	
1995	Courting Justice	Dr. Alexander	
1996	The Limbic Region	Teacher	
1998	Voyage of Terror	Dr. Norman Ellisy	
1999	Murder Most Likely	Detective Inspector	
2000	Killing Moon	Ed	
2000	Becoming Dick	Dr. Hardwin	
2002	Damaged Care	Dr. Sam Verbush	
2002	Saint Sinner	Father Michael	
2002	100 Days in the Jungle	—N/a	
2003	Word of Honor	Lewis Kaplan	
2004	The Cradle Will Fall	Dist. Atty. Alex Myerson	
2005	Dark Pines	Shannon Fraser	
2006	Dark Storm	General Killion	
2006	Her Fatal Flaw	Richard O'Brien	
2006	The Secret of Hidden Lake	Judge Landers	
2007	Judicial Indiscretion	Senator Garland Wolf	
2009	Something Evil Comes	Mr. Dutton	
2009	Web of Desire	Dr. Charles Friedman	
2010	Medium Raw: Night of the Wolf	Dr. Robert Parker	
2011	Behemoth	William Walsh	
2013	Stonados	Ben	

=== Television series ===
Year	Title	Role	Notes
1984	SCTV Channel	Man on the phone	Episode: "Half Wits Save the World Parade"
1986	The Beachcombers	Dave Douglas	Episode: "Trial Balloon"
1987	Danger Bay	Norris	Episode: "High Five"
1987	Airwolf	Newman ("Company" official)	4 episodes
1987	21 Jump Street	Mr. Wiedlin	Episode: "Mean Streets and Pastel Houses"
1988	Captain Power and the Soldiers of the Future	Arvin	Episode: "Judgement"
1988	Danger Bay	Jack Kane	Episode: "Racing Against Time"
1988	21 Jump Street	Mr. Wickenton	Episode: "Champagne High"
1988	Wiseguy	Curant	Episode: "The Merchant of Death"
1989	Wiseguy	Inspector #2	Episode: "People Do It All the Time"
1991	21 Jump Street	Judge Harrison	Episode: "Crossfire"
1991	MacGyver	Judge	Episode: "Trail of Tears"
1991	The Commish	Don Chesley	2 episodes
1992	Street Justice	Badgely	Episode: "Homecoming"
1992	Nightmare Cafe	Doctor	Episode: "Sanctuary for a Child"
1993	North of 60	Inspector Nelson	Episode: "Out of the Blue"
1993–2018	The X-Files	The Smoking Man	43 episodes
1995	Sliders	Prof. Myman	Episode: "Eggheads"
1995	The Outer Limits	Ed	Episode: "The Conversion"
1996	Poltergeist: The Legacy	Dr. Bill Nigel	Episode: "Do Not Go Gently"
1996	The Outer Limits	John Wymer	Episode: "Out of Body"
1999	Mentors	Sir Arthur Conan Doyle	Episode: "The Truth Is in Here"
2000	The Fearing Mind	Michell Cofax	Episode: "Gentlemen Caller"
2001	First Wave	Sagon	Episode: "Checkmate"
2001	The Outer Limits	Dr. Biemler	Episode: "Worlds Within"
2001	MythQuest	Head Priest	Episode: "The Oracle"
2001	Andromeda	Professor Logitch	Episode: "Pitiless as the Sun"
2003	Smallville	Mayor William 'Billy' Tate	2 episodes
2004	Kingdom Hospital	Dean Swinton	Episode: "The Young and the Headless"
2004	Murdoch Mysteries	Alderman Godfrey Shepcote	Episode: "Except the Dying"
2005	Tilt	Father Mike	Episode: "Nobody Ever Listens"
2005	Robson Arms	Dr. Carlisle Wainwright	10 episodes
2005–2006	Stargate SG-1	Ori Prior Damaris	2 episodes
2006	Supernatural	College Professor	Episode: "Scarecrow"
2006	Canadian Comedy Shorts	Finance Minister	Episode: "Episode #10.9"
2007	Masters of Science Fiction	The President	Episode: "The Awakening"
2008	Fear Itself	Father Chris	Episode: "In Sickness and in Health"
2009	Caprica	Minister Chambers	Episode: "Pilot"
2010	Human Target	Whitey Doyle	Episode: "Run"
2012–2015	Continuum	Older Alec Sadler	10 episodes
2013–2015	The Haunting Hour: The Series	Plumberg and Grandpa Everette	Episode: "Bad Egg" and “Grandpa’s Glasses”
2019	Chilling Adventures of Sabrina	Methuselah	2 episodes
2020–2023	Upload	David Choak	15 episodes
2020	50 States of Fright	Frank	TV short
2022	The Midnight Club	Mirror Man	4 episodes
2025	Murder in a Small Town	Captain Darcy Stewart	1 episode

=== Video games ===
Year	Title	Role	Notes
2004	The X-Files: Resist or Serve	The Smoking Man	
