= Sein und Zeit (The X-Files) =

- The X-Files episode
- Episode no.: Season 7 Episode 10
- Directed by: Michael Watkins
- Written by: Chris Carter; Frank Spotnitz
- Production code: 7ABX10
- Original air date: February 6, 2000
- Running time: 44 minutes

Guest appearances
- Mitch Pileggi as Walter Skinner; Megan Corletto as Amber Lynn LaPierre; Shareen Mitchell as Billie LaPierre; Mark Rolston as Bud LaPierre; Spencer Garrett as Harry Bring; Rebecca Toolan as Teena Mulder; Martin Grey as Agent Flagler; Kim Darby as Kethy Lee Tencate; Randall Bosley as Ed Truelove; Marie Chambers as Guard; John Harnagel as World-Weary Dad; Dylan St. Jepovic as Dean Tencate; Nancy Tiballi as News Anchor #1; John Bisom as News Anchor #2; Nick Lashaway as Young Mulder; Ashlynn Rose as Young Samantha

Episode chronology
← Previous "Signs and Wonders"	Next → "Closure"
- The X-Files season 7

"Sein und Zeit" is the tenth episode of the seventh season of the science fiction television series The X-Files. The German language title directly references Martin Heidegger's best known work, translated as "Being and Time" in English. It premiered on the Fox network on February 6, 2000, in the United States. The episode was written by Chris Carter and Frank Spotnitz, and directed by Michael Watkins. The episode helped to explore the series' overarching mythology. "Sein und Zeit" earned a Nielsen household rating of 8.4, being watched by 13.95 million people in its initial broadcast. It received mixed to positive reviews from critics.

The show centers on FBI special agents Fox Mulder (David Duchovny) and Dana Scully (Gillian Anderson), who work on cases linked to the paranormal, called X-Files. Mulder is a believer in the paranormal, while the skeptical Scully has been assigned to debunk his work. In this episode, Mulder becomes obsessed with a number of children who have vanished while investigating the bizarre disappearance of a young girl from her home. In the meanwhile, Scully fears that he is emotionally involved due to his sister's disappearance 27 years earlier. Her fears are heightened when Mulder's mother dies, apparently of suicide.

"Sein und Zeit" was written as the first part of a two-part arc that would eventually reveal what had happened to Samantha Mulder. Executive producer Frank Spotnitz later noted that the episode bore stylistic similarities to the fourth-season episode "Paper Hearts". Several production issues plagued the episode, including the arrest of one crew member who was accused of possible kidnap, and the lack of money needed for the faux newscast scene at the end of the episode.

== Plot ==
Fox Mulder (David Duchovny) asks to be a part of the investigation looking for a little girl, Amber Lynn LaPierre, who disappeared from her home in Sacramento, California. Mulder's superior, Walter Skinner (Mitch Pileggi), initially denies his request, noting that the investigation is not an X-file, but simply a missing persons case. Mulder, however, convinces Skinner to allow him to investigate. The parents of Amber, Billie and Bud, tell Mulder that they found a note in the girl's bedroom, but the teaser for the episode revealed that the note was written by Billie herself. The note contains a mention of Santa Claus, which everyone finds out of place. Although the family is held for questioning, Mulder does not believe they did it. Looking through previous cases, Mulder finds a similar note, with a reference to Santa Claus, from a missing person case in Idaho from 1987. In the case, the mother was convicted and sentenced to twelve years. The file notes that she had a vision of her son dead before he disappeared, as did Bud on the night his daughter disappeared.

Meanwhile, Mulder's mother Teena is found dead in her home. It is found she overdosed on sleeping pills after she burned all her pictures of Samantha and placed tape around her baseboards and turned the gas in the oven on. Mulder believes she was murdered and has Dana Scully (Gillian Anderson) do an autopsy. Later, Mulder visits the mother who was convicted twelve years prior. She tells him that Samantha is a walk-in, a kind spirit who takes children so that they may be shielded from potential harm in their life. The mother tells Mulder that the children are safe, but she has no idea where they are. After hearing this, Mulder believes his mother probably also wrote a note after his sister's disappearance. He begins to think that the alien abduction never happened, and that his mother figured this out, which is why she was murdered. However, after performing the autopsy, Scully tells Mulder that it was definitely suicide, because she was ill with Paget's carcinoma.

During the happenings of the episode, a man playing Santa at a Christmas-themed ranch is shown videotaping the children at his ranch. Billie later tells Mulder that she saw a vision of her daughter in her room and that she said the number 74. Mulder decides he cannot finish the case and wants to take time off because he's too close to make any sound judgment. On their way to the airport, Scully comes across the Santa park (situated off of California State Route 74) and decides to stop because of the reference to Santa Claus in the notes. Here they find the videotape setup and tapes dating back to the 1960s, including one of Amber Lynn LaPierre. The man who runs the park is promptly arrested, and Mulder finds graves of children all over his ranch.

== Production ==
=== Writing ===
Although both the season four episode "Paper Hearts" and the season five episode "Redux II" had dealt with possible explanations for Samantha Mulder's fate, the issue had yet to be resolved when the series moved into its seventh season. Series creator Chris Carter was well aware that season seven might have been the show's last, so he decided that with "Sein und Zeit", the show would start to conclude the story. He explained: "The expectation was that if this were going to be the final season, that the finale would be about Mulder's sister. We wanted to deal with that sooner rather than later. We wanted to wrap up Mulder's emotion story with his sister and do it in such a way that would emphasize [David Duchovny's] dramatic abilities."

Executive producer Frank Spotnitz felt that the episode bore stylistic similarities to "Paper Hearts". However, unlike that episode, "Sein und Zeit" and its second part "Closure" set out to actually answer the question of Samantha's disappearance. Spotnitz later explained, "it's similar […] in the sense that what you always thought happened to Samantha may not have actually happened. 'Paper Hearts' never ultimately answers the question. We've had people come up to us and say, 'Okay, so we know she's really dead, so what happened?' So we decided in this one to answer the question." The episode's title is a reference to Martin Heidegger's seminal work of the same name, which is German for "Being and Time".

=== Production issues ===
Several accidents hindered the production of the episode, the first of which revolved around a fake ransom note that included the threatening line "Don't do anything or we'll kill your baby". The prop department had mocked up this document for the scene in which Mrs. LaPierre automatically writes the kidnapper's message. A crew member for the show later took the note (included in a folder with other documents) to a pay phone before driving to the shooting location, and after his call, he neglected to pick up the folder. A person watching the crew member became suspicious of his behavior and called the police. Later, the crew member realized his mistake and returned to retrieve the note, where he was promptly arrested. Director Kim Manners later called the situation a "mess".

The second major event that hindered production involved a lack of money. As production for "Sein und Zeit" was wrapping up, the production crew depleted all of their funding. However, there was one critical scene that still needed to be filmed: a short sequence of a TV news anchor reporting on the events of the episode. To overcome the issue, producer Paul Rabwin got creative; he eschewed asking Fox for more money by instead reaching out to Robert Penfold, a local TV correspondent who was based out of Los Angeles. Rabwin asked Penfold "to 'donate' the needed news report for a chance to be on The X-Files"—an offer which Penfold happily accepted. According to Rabwin, "We went to his studio setup, inserted a visual of a busy newsroom behind the correspondent, added some pictures of the kidnapped children, and we had our scene."

== Broadcast and reception ==
"Sein und Zeit" first aired in the United States on February 6, 2000. This episode earned a Nielsen rating of 8.4, with a 12 share, meaning that roughly 8.4 percent of all television-equipped households, and 12 percent of households watching television, were tuned in to the episode. It was viewed by 13.95 million viewers. The episode aired in the United Kingdom and Ireland on Sky1 on May 21, 2000, and received 0.83 million viewers, making it the sixth most watched episode that week. The episode was later included on The X-Files Mythology, Volume 3 – Colonization, a DVD collection that contains episodes involved with the alien Colonist's plans to take over the earth.

Emily VanDerWerff of The A.V. Club awarded the episode an "A−" and called it a "very, very good piece of television". She was particularly pleased with the grimness of the story; she noted that it was largely about the way in which Mulder's "belief system [is] eradicated before his very eyes" after the suicide of his mom. VanDerWerff was also pleased with Duchovny's performance, writing that he "brings the intense mania to Mulder that has always made the character work at his best." Despite this, she was slightly critical of the concept of the "walk-ins", which she called "patently ridiculous". Rich Rosell from DigitallyObsessed.com awarded the episode 4.5 out of 5 stars and wrote that while "Chris Carter penned this episode, [and] his attempts at clarifying his own confounded mythology are often even more confusing than revelatory, 'Sein Und Zeit' is a tense installment, and leads neatly to the supposed wrap-up in the second half. " Tom Kessenich, in his book Examinations, gave the episode a largely positive review, writing "'Sein Und Zeit' not only served as a reminder of Fox Mulder's ongoing pain it provided yet another clue that, although its journey is nearing its completion, The X-Files still knows how to make the ride an enjoyable one." Robert Shearman, in his book Wanting to Believe: A Critical Guide to The X-Files, Millennium & The Lone Gunmen, rated the episode five stars out of five. The author called the episode "a welcome return to an X-Files we haven't seen for awhile—hard, passionate, and with an urgent story to tell. From where I'm sitting, in the middle of a lacklustre season, it smells strongly of a masterpiece."

Other reviews were less complimentary. Paula Vitaris from Cinefantastique gave the episode a mixed review and awarded it two stars out of four. Vitaris wrote, "there are some powerful and touching moments in 'Sein und Zeit', but others that miss the mark so widely that it hurts to think what this episode might have been." Kenneth Silber from Space.com, although complimentary towards the focus on Samantha Mulder, was critical of the slowness of the episode, writing, "While the series' reversion to its central theme is much appreciated, this episode unfolds with an unfortunate slowness that does little to satisfy the seven-year itch many X-Files viewers have come to feel in response to monster-of-the-week episodes and phony-baloney mythology cliffhangers."

== Bibliography ==
- Kessenich, Tom (2002). Examination: An Unauthorized Look at Seasons 6–9 of the X-Files. Trafford Publishing. ISBN 1-55369-812-6.
- Shapiro, Marc (2000). All Things: The Official Guide to the X-Files Volume 6. Harper Prism. ISBN 0-06-107611-2.
- Shearman, Robert (2009). Wanting to Believe: A Critical Guide to The X-Files, Millennium & The Lone Gunmen. Mad Norwegian Press. ISBN 978-0-9759446-9-1.
