= Closure (The X-Files) =

- The X-Files episode
- Fox Mulder is reunited with Samantha Mulder's spirit. The scene utilized several elaborate filming techniques.
- Episode no.: Season 7 Episode 11
- Directed by: Kim Manners
- Written by: Chris Carter; Frank Spotnitz
- Production code: 7ABX11
- Original air date: February 13, 2000
- Running time: 44 minutes

Guest appearances
- William B. Davis as The Smoking Man; Mitch Pileggi as Walter Skinner; Anthony Heald as Harold Piller; Stanley Anderson as Lewis Schoniger; Rebecca Toolan as Teena Mulder; Megan Corletto as Amber Lynn LaPierre; Nicholas Stratton as Ghostly Boy; Mimi Paley as Young Samantha Mulder

Episode chronology
← Previous "Sein und Zeit"	Next → "X-Cops"
- The X-Files season 7

"Closure" is the eleventh episode of the seventh season of the science fiction television series The X-Files, and the 150th episode overall. It was directed by Kim Manners and written by series creator Chris Carter and Frank Spotnitz. The installment explores the series' overarching mythology and is the conclusion of a two-part episode revolving around the final revelation of what really happened to Fox Mulder's (David Duchovny) sister, Samantha. Originally aired by the Fox network on February 13, 2000, "Closure" received a Nielsen rating of 9.1 and was seen by 15.35 million viewers. The episode received mostly positive reviews from critics; many felt that the final reveal was emotional and powerful, although some were unhappy with the resolution.

The show centers on FBI special agents Fox Mulder (Duchovny) and Dana Scully (Gillian Anderson) who work on cases linked to the paranormal, called X-Files. Mulder is a believer in the paranormal, while the skeptical Scully has been assigned to debunk his work, but the two have developed a deep friendship. In this episode, after Mulder is forced to accept that his mother's death was by her own hand, he is led by a man whose son disappeared years earlier to another truth: that his sister, Samantha, was among the souls taken by ‘walk-ins’, saving the souls of children doomed to live unhappy lives.

"Closure" was a story milestone for the series, finally revealing Samantha's fate; this story-arc had driven a large part of the series' earlier episodes. The episode was written as a continuation to the previous episode, "Sein und Zeit," but branched off into different territory. Although a majority of the episode was filmed on a soundstage, several scenes were shot on location, such as the scenes at the former Norton Air Force Base in San Bernardino, California. Several of the sequences, specifically those featuring the souls of dead children, required elaborate filming techniques. The episode has been analyzed due to its themes of belief and hope.

== Plot ==
=== Background ===
For the first five seasons of the series, FBI federal agents Fox Mulder (David Duchovny) and Dana Scully (Gillian Anderson) sought to gain understanding about the disappearance of Mulder's sister, Samantha, who was abducted when Mulder was 12 years old. In the previous episode, "Sein und Zeit", Mulder and Scully tracked down a serial killer who targeted children. While investigating the case, Mulder began to get emotionally involved, due to the similarities with his sister's disappearance.

=== Events ===
Mulder and Scully aid the Sacramento Police in the investigation of a brutal murder committed by Truelove, the owner of the Santa Village. As the remains of more children are discovered, he admits killing twenty-four children, but denies murdering Amber Lynn LaPierre, who disappeared from her home in the previous episode. Mulder is approached by psychic Harold Piller, who tells Mulder that he has helped law enforcement across the world, and has proved in various cases that children had been taken by "walk-ins", beings composed of starlight. Piller believes that walk-ins save children who suffer terrible fates.

Scully becomes worried about Piller's influence over Mulder. The agents return to Washington, D.C., where Mulder keeps searching for evidence in the case. Meanwhile, Piller gets a vision of Mulder's mother, who recently died by suicide, leading Mulder to April Air Force Base. Scully finds evidence that Samantha's disappearance is linked to The Smoking Man (William B. Davis); when she returns to her apartment, she finds him waiting for her. He tells her that he had called off the search for Mulder's sister when she vanished because he knew she was dead.

When Mulder returns to April Air Force Base, he uncovers proof that Samantha lived with the Smoking Man along with his son, Jeffrey Spender, and that she was forced to undergo painful tests. Scully finds a 1979 police report of a girl matching Samantha's description, and learns that she was taken to a hospital emergency room. She and Mulder find the nurse who treated her, and the nurse describes how Samantha disappeared the same way as Amber, without a trace. Mulder later walks through the forest and has a vision of Samantha along with the spirits of other children, including Amber Lynn. Upon telling Scully and Piller of his vision, Piller reacts badly upon hearing that his son is dead, while Mulder accepts that his sister is dead and in a better place. When Scully comforts Mulder and asks if he is all right, he responds with a choked "I'm fine. I'm free."

== Production ==
=== Writing ===
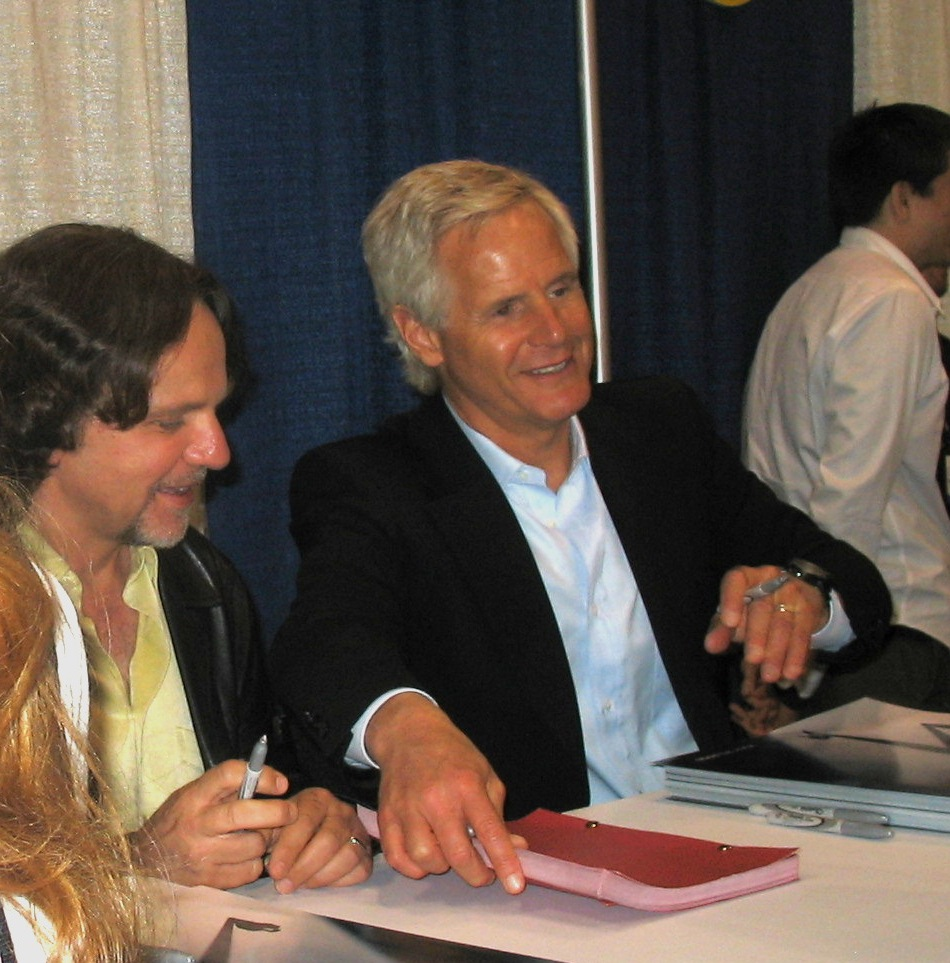
"Closure" was written by Frank Spotnitz (left) and Chris Carter (right) to give closure to the Samantha Mulder story-arc.

"Closure," written by series creator Chris Carter and executive producer Frank Spotnitz, brought an end to Mulder's quest for his sister, Samantha, who had been abducted when he was a child. While the idea to close the story arc received mixed reactions from various production and crew members, many realized that the time had come for the show to answer one of its biggest questions. Spotnitz explained that, "I think [series star, David Duchovny] grew tired of playing the man who is missing his sister. [...] I told him, 'This is going to be the last time you're going to have to play [that part].'" Paul Rabwin noted that, "It's been seven years. I don't think any of us are going to miss Samantha Mulder. That device and motivation were very strong in the early years of the show. But as the years have gone by, the speculation kind of melted away."

"Closure" continued where the previous episode, "Sein und Zeit", left off but branched off into different territory. Carter later explained that, "emotionally, it was heavy stuff for everybody, but necessarily so. These episodes involved two very personal cases, the search for a serial killer [in 'Sein und Zeit'] and the search for Mulder's sister [in 'Closure']." Marc Shapiro, in his book All Things: The Official Guide to The X-Files, Vol. 6 noted that, in addition to bringing an end to the Samantha story arc, the episode was "very much a [Smoking Man] episode" in that it explored his involvement in Samantha's abduction and revealed to the audience that he was seriously ill. The episode's tagline was changed from the usual "The Truth is Out There" to "Believe to Understand".

=== Filming ===
Manners argued that "Closure" was one of the first episodes in which the production staff was able to "shoot in Los Angeles with the sun out". Previous to this episode, the show's production staff was "struggling with the fact that we weren't in Vancouver anymore and that our show had suddenly become very bright and cheery". To amend this, Bill Roe, director of photography, used tree branches and c-stands to block out the sunlight. The first scene with the walk-ins rising up from their grave, shot at Griffith Park above the playground, was "tricky," according to director Kim Manners, as he felt uncomfortable telling the children to rise out of "graves", feeling it could psychologically hurt them; instead, he had the crew call the holes in the ground "forts." The scenes taking place at April Air Force Base were shot in San Bernardino, California, at a closed airfield, the former Norton Air Force Base. On the airbase was a large, derelict complex of over 400 buildings (many of them houses) that had been constructed and used by the United States military. According to Manners, the entire area was an "eerie ... ghost town", as many of the houses were still full of old, abandoned furniture. Originally, the producers wanted the name of the fictitious air force base to be "March Air Force Base". However, the presence of a real air reserve base with the same name located less than 10 miles away in Riverside, California, necessitated a change to "April Air Force Base". The scene at the restaurant was shot at the Carriage Inn on Sepulveda Boulevard.

During filming, David Duchovny decided to act out the reunion scene in a manner contrary to what the script called for. Manners later said, "In the script, it called for his sister to run up and hug him, and Mulder was to start crying. David didn't want to cry. I said, 'David, you're finally realizing your sister is, in fact, dead.' […] He said, 'Just watch what I do; trust me.' And, he held that little girl actress—there was a beatific smile on his face that was absolutely astounding." Manners was very happy with the change and included it in the final cut of the episode. To create the scene featuring the ghosts of the dead children interacting with the characters, various layers of film had to be overlaid onto each other. The scenes were laborious and took "many passes" to complete. After the shots had been secured, the film of the ghosts had to be made slightly transparent. These scenes were actually shot in daylight, and a specialized "day for night" photography (in which the subjects were illuminated with bright lights and the sky was completely avoided) was used to make the finished scene look as if it had been filmed at night. The scenes were shot at 48 frames a second, twice that of the show's normal filming speed. Rebecca Toolan traveled to Los Angeles from Vancouver specifically for this episode and "Sein Und Zeit". To create her ghostly apparition, the production staff filmed Toolan and superimposed the image over a shot of Duchovny. Manners played the part of the hypnotist in the video that Scully watches, with the director-turned-actor later noting, "I only act when you can't actually see my face". Manners was critical of Duchovny's wig used in this scene—which had been added to make the footage seem older. He sardonically noted that "this is [not] one of the episodes that Cheri Medcalf [the show's make-up director] won an Emmy for."

Composer Mark Snow described his score as possessing a "sense of biblical fervor and religiosity—an elegy—a feeling about it that was so poignant and touching to me." "My Weakness", a song by Moby from his 1999 album Play, is used in this episode, first when the FBI discover the mass grave and finally at the end when Mulder encounters his sister's spirit. Carter never told Snow about the decision to use someone else's music, although Snow has since said that his reaction to the use of the song was very positive and that the song was a "perfect" fit. Another Moby song, "The Sky is Broken" also from Play, would be featured in the later seventh-season episode "all things".

== Themes ==
"I want to believe so badly; in a truth beyond our own hidden and obscured from all but the most sensitive eyes. In the endless procession of souls, in what cannot and will not be destroyed. I want to believe we are unaware of God's eternal recompense and sadness. That we cannot see His truth. That that which is born still lives and cannot be buried in the cold earth. But only waits to be born again at God's behest, where in ancient starlight we lay in repose."

— Fox Mulder. The monologue received attention due to its perceived religious undertones.

According to Amy M. Donaldson in her book We Want to Believe: Faith and Gospel in The X-Files, Mulder's opening monologue may be an example of "Mulder now being more receptive to the possibility of God's intervention". Throughout much of the series, Mulder has shown a disdain for religion. However, in "Closure", Donaldson points out that "Mulder's belief in God, as always, revolves around his beliefs about his sister's fate". As such, Mulder expresses hope that those who die in a cruel fashion "live on in some other way". Furthermore, she argues that because "Closure" opens with the tagline "Believe to understand", Mulder must "take the leap of faith" in order to find enlightenment, and ultimately the truth about his sister. The first half of the episode plays out according to the tagline; Mulder first believes in "his desire stated in the opening voiceover", and then finds closure.

Donaldson also parallels elements in the episode to the plots of other episodes such as the fourth season entry "Paper Hearts", wherein it is suggested that a serial killer murdered Samantha. In "Paper Hearts", a father of a victim notes that the uncertainty of his daughter's murder allowed those who were involved to "consider the possibilities, both for the best and for the worst". However, once it is revealed that his daughter was murdered, all hope was removed. Conversely, Mulder holds onto the possibility that Samantha is alive through much of the series, but when he realizes that she is indeed dead in "Closure", hope is removed but in its place is found peace. To parallel Mulder's acceptance, Harold Piller refuses to believe his son is dead; as such, he "cling[s] to the possibility [because] uncertainty allows him hope."

== Reception ==
=== Ratings ===
"Closure" first aired in the United States on February 13, 2000. The episode earned a Nielsen household rating of 9.1, with a 13 share. Nielsen ratings are audience measurement systems that determine the audience size and composition of television programming in the U.S. This means that roughly 9.1 percent of all television-equipped households, and 13 percent of households watching television, were watching the episode. It was viewed by 15.35 million viewers in the United States. The episode was later included on The X-Files Mythology, Volume 3 – Colonization, a DVD collection that contains episodes involved with the alien Colonist's plans to take over the earth.

=== Initial reviews ===
Initial reviews were mixed, with some critics applauding the story's conclusion, and others deriding it. Tom Kessenich, in his book Examinations: An Unauthorized Look at Seasons 6–9 of the X-Files, opined that the episode worked best "if some of the previous Samantha-related clues were forgotten", such as when the Alien Bounty Hunter told Mulder that she was still alive in "End Game". Despite this, he wrote that "it was only right that Samantha be dead since Mulder's life had always been defined by what he has lost, not what he has found". He surmised that the episode was not "perfect", but that its "plusses greatly outweighed any missteps along the way". He was also complimentary towards "the ethereal quality of the final few moments", writing that they "lifted this episode up and made it one of the season's most memorable". Kenneth Silber from Space.com was pleased with the episode, and wrote, "'Closure' is a satisfying episode, one that puts to bed the now-tiresome search for Mulder's sister Samantha." Jeremy Conrad from IGN referred to the episode as "excellent" and noted that a large portion of The X-Files mythology ended with the resolution of Samantha's abduction, saying, "['Closure' is] a final, and concrete, answer to the single thing that was driving Mulder for the entire run of the series. In some ways, when he got that answer a major part of The X-Files story ended."

Not all reviews were positive. Paula Vitaris from CFQ gave the episode a negative review and awarded it one-and-a-half stars out of four. She wrote, "Instead of a grand, breath-taking, heart-breaking finale that should be the climax of Mulder's search for Samantha, the story expires limply with some nonsense about Samantha being of the starlight children." Bobby Bryant and Tracy Burlison of The State named the episode the "Worst Conspiracy" episode. The two noted that because "a tenet of The X-Files was that Mulder's sister, Samantha, had been (a) kidnapped by aliens or (b) kidnapped by government conspirators", the fact that she had actually been turned into a spirit "insanely offers a supernatural explanation to a science-fiction mystery".

=== Later reviews ===
Later reviews have seen "Closure" in a much more positive light, with many critics praising its ending. Zack Handlen of The A.V. Club awarded the episode an "A−". He argued that the episode worked due to two scenes: the sequence in which Mulder reads aloud from Samantha's diary, and the final shot of Mulder being reunited with his sister. He wrote that the "stark simplicity" of the former made it emotionally powerful, and that the latter was "a bit sappy, a bit surreal, a bit lovely" but nonetheless "a beautiful moment". Meghan Deans of Tor.com felt that the story was "silly", but that, when paired with the idea that Samantha was truly an innocent victim, successfully becomes a "comfort". She called it a move that "the show must give Mulder, and us, in order to shut down this storyline for good." Robert Shearman, in his book Wanting to Believe: A Critical Guide to The X-Files, Millennium & The Lone Gunmen, rated the episode four stars out of five, and called it "brave". The author noted that while some of the episode's sentimentality is pushed too far—such as when Mulder finds his sister's diary speaking to him, or when Mulder talks about all lost souls being stars—the "critical moment" featuring Mulder reuniting with his sister's spirit is "extraordinarily moving".

== Bibliography ==
- Donaldson, Amy (2011). We Want to Believe: Faith and Gospel in the X-Files. Cascade Books. ISBN 9781606083611.
- Fraga, Erica (2010). LAX-Files: Behind the Scenes with the Los Angeles Cast and Crew. CreateSpace. ISBN 9781451503418.
- Hurwitz, Matt; Knowles, Chris (2008). The Complete X-Files. Insight Editions. ISBN 9781933784724.
- Kessenich, Tom (2002). Examinations: An Unauthorized Look at Seasons 6–9 of the X-Files. Trafford Publishing. ISBN 9781553698128.
- Kowalski, Dean, ed. (2007). The Philosophy of The X-Files. University Press of Kentucky. ISBN 978-0813124544.
- Shapiro, Marc (2000). All Things: The Official Guide to the X-Files Volume 6. Harper Prism. ISBN 9780061076114.
- Shearman, Robert (2009). Wanting to Believe: A Critical Guide to The X-Files, Millennium & The Lone Gunmen. Mad Norwegian Press. ISBN 9780975944691.
