= Signs and Wonders (The X-Files) =

- The X-Files episode
- Mulder is attacked by demonically-possessed snakes. Due to the nature of the episode, it was described as "one of the scariest episodes of season 7" by one reviewer.
- Episode no.: Season 7 Episode 9
- Directed by: Kim Manners
- Written by: Jeffrey Bell
- Production code: 7ABX09
- Original air date: January 23, 2000
- Running time: 44 minutes

Guest appearances
- Randy Oglesby as Reverend Samuel Mackey; Michael Childers as Reverend Enoch O'Connor; Tracy Middendorf as Gracie; Beth Grant as Iris Finster; Eric Nenninger as Jared Chirp; Elyse Donalson as Elderly Woman; Phyllis Franklin as Middle-Aged Woman; Dan Manning as Deputy; Steve Johnson as EMT; Philip Lenkowsky as Holy Spirit Man #1; Clement E. Blake as Holy Spirit Man #2; Donna May as Holy Spirit Woman #1

Episode chronology
← Previous "The Amazing Maleeni"	Next → "Sein und Zeit"
- The X-Files season 7

"Signs and Wonders" is the ninth episode of the seventh season of the science fiction television series The X-Files. It premiered on the Fox network in the United States on January 23, 2000. It was written by Jeffrey Bell, directed by Kim Manners. The episode is a "Monster-of-the-Week" story, unconnected to the series' wider mythology. "Signs and Wonders" earned a Nielsen household rating of 8.5, being watched by 13.86 million people in its initial broadcast. The episode received mixed reviews from television critics.

The show centers on FBI special agents Fox Mulder (David Duchovny) and Dana Scully (Gillian Anderson) who work on cases linked to the paranormal, called X-Files. Mulder is a believer in the paranormal, while the skeptical Scully has been assigned to debunk his work. In this episode, Mulder and Scully investigate the Church of God with Signs and Wonders, a church where the Bible is read literally, and punishment is dealt deftly, after a small town church is the site of a number of ritualistic-like murders. But soon the agents realize that the difference between the peaceful religious and the fanatics may not be very much at all.

Bell wished to write a "down-and-dirty" horror story about a snake-handling church. Furthermore, Bell wanted the true antagonist of the episode to remain hidden until the very end. In order to do this, the script was written so that Mulder suspected the wrong individual. According to executive producer Frank Spotnitz, the theme of the episode was "intolerance can be good", in some cases. The episode used live rattlesnakes; at any one time, there were between six and fifty snakes on the set.

== Plot ==
In Blessing, Tennessee, Jared Chirp, while attempting to flee his home, is attacked by rattlesnakes inside his car and killed. Federal agents Fox Mulder (David Duchovny) and Dana Scully (Gillian Anderson) confer with Reverend Mackey of Blessing Community Church and investigate Reverend Enoch O'Connor, the pastor of a fundamentalist, snake-handling congregation, who is the prime suspect. Later, a Community Church congregation member named Iris tells Reverend Mackey that she feels guilty because Jared called the night he died wanting to speak to his pregnant girlfriend, Gracie, but she was already asleep and Iris didn't want to wake her. Later that night, Iris is bitten when her staple remover turns into a snake; she promptly goes into the bathroom to clean the wound, but is killed when snakes appear everywhere in the bathroom.

Mulder and Scully question Gracie and discover that she is O'Connor's daughter and was banished from the congregation and her home following her pregnancy. The agents return to O'Connor's church to search it. Scully is attacked by O'Connor, who thrusts her hand into a rattlesnake's cage but is stopped by Mulder. O'Connor is arrested and, while in his cell, is attacked by dozens of snakes. He is taken to the hospital, barely alive, but is not given antivenom because Gracie insists it would go against his religious beliefs. When she is alone with him in his hospital room, O'Connor's wounds begin to spontaneously expel the venom, and he regains consciousness, takes Gracie, and flees. After Mulder and Scully find test results at Jared Chirp's house revealing that he was infertile, Reverend Mackey tells them that Enoch O'Connor is the father of Gracie's child.

Meanwhile, O'Connor takes Gracie back to his church and baptizes her. Gracie spontaneously goes into labor, and she gives birth to live snakes. O'Connor goes to Mackey's church and attempts to kill him, but Mulder intervenes and saves Mackey, wounding O'Connor. In the ambulance, Scully tells Gracie that she's safe now from her father, but the young mother says that actually, her father saved her. Back at the church, Mulder realizes O'Connor was innocent all along, that Mackey is the real father of her baby and that he killed the others to prevent them from knowing the truth, as well as wanting to destroy O'Connor's congregation. He confronts Mackey, but the demonic pastor telekinetically locks the door and summons snakes, which promptly attack Mulder. Scully is able to break down the door and save Mulder in time. Mackey disappears, but resurfaces in Connecticut, having changed his name to Reverend Wells, and joins another church. After he accepts his new post, he sits at his desk, removes a live mouse from a box, then sits back as a snake emerges from his throat and devours it.

== Production ==
=== Writing ===
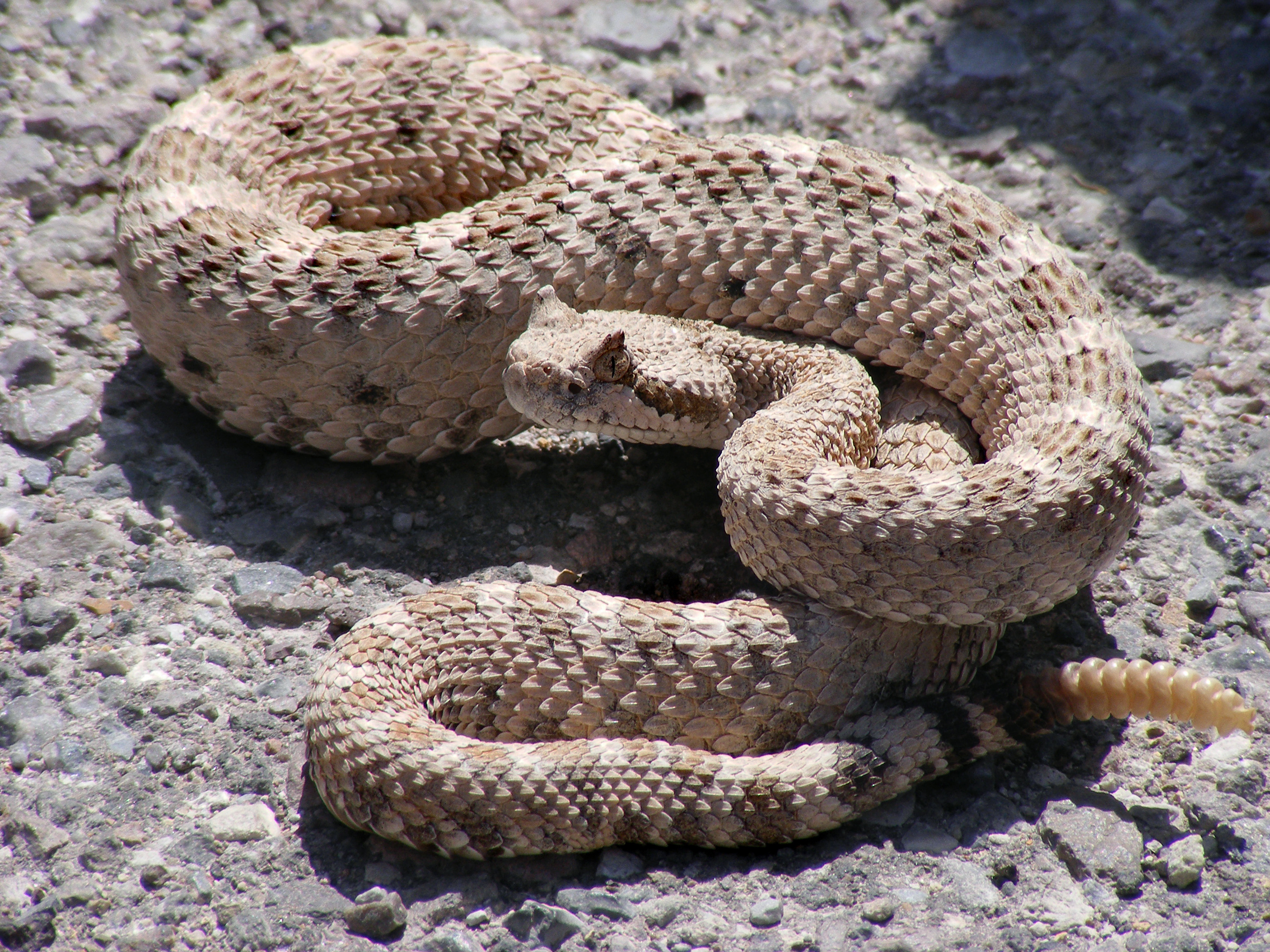
The episode used anywhere from six to fifty live rattlesnakes at one time.

"Signs and Wonders" was written by The X-Files staff writer Jeffrey Bell, who had long wanted to write a "down-and-dirty" horror story for the series. Inspired by his informal study of snake handling, Bell eventually decided to write a tale involving snakes and an extremist church because it "would be scary". Diverging from most stories that involve extremist religious sects, the main theme of "Signs and Wonders" is that in certain circumstances, "intolerance can be good", per executive producer Frank Spotnitz.

Bell "wanted the snake church people to end up being the good guys." However, he felt that the toughest task in writing the episode would be successfully hiding the true antagonist in plain sight. According to Bell, "The way the shows usually work out, Mulder is the one to figure out who the bad guys are. So I went into the story meeting with the idea of having Mulder being wrong. Because Mulder believes so strong it's the other guy, it helped hide the true identity of the bad guy from the audience."

During the snake handling scene at the Church of God with Signs and Wonders, the song being sung by the congregation is called "May Glory Protect Us". The song was written by executive producer Paul Rabwin, who was heavily involved in the episode's music production. Rabwin later noted, "I auditioned a bunch of gospel songs [to episode director Kim Manners]. I told him I could write one that was better and he told me to go for it. And I did. ... Kim loved it. ... It was a great tribute that he was able to ask me and accept my opinion on it."

=== Casting and filming ===
The casting for "Signs & Wonders" was "rather unorthodox". In order to prevent ophidiophobia from affecting the actors on the day of filming, live rattlesnakes were brought in during the casting sessions. Many of the actors were "thrilled" when they got to hold the snakes, according to Kim Manners. He later noted that "the funny thing was that the actors couldn't wait to hold the rattlesnakes ... but we were still nervous." Coincidentally, the father of Michael Childers—the actor who portrayed Reverend O'Connor—had actually been a snake preacher. Manners later noted that "he had gone to church as a child and handled snakes."

Before production on "Signs & Wonders", the producers organized several safety meetings to prevent any possible accidents on the set. One of the first orders of business was locating the nearest hospital, according to make-up effects coordinator John Vulich. Fear of an accident was compounded by some of the cast and crew members' fear of snakes, including Manners, David Duchovny, and John Shiban. Despite the precautions, an accident very nearly occurred when a live rattlesnake was brought to the show's set and escaped. It was eventually located hiding in Manners' office. In order to prevent future accidents, the mouths of the snakes were sealed with sutures.

=== Special effects ===
According to stunt coordinator Danny Weselis, "At any one time ... there were between six and fifty snakes on the set". During the scene where Mulder is attacked by a nest of snakes, fifteen live snakes were used. However, due to his fear of snakes, Duchovny himself was "not within blocks" of the shot, and a stunt double was used instead. Several faux-body parts were attached to the actors to simulate snake bites. One particular pair of fake arms, which was used for Mulder, was reused from the sixth-season episode "Dreamland". A false stomach was created for Tracy Middendorf, who portrayed Gracie, to give the illusion that live snakes were wriggling inside of her.

At one point in the episode, Expulsion from the Garden of Eden, a famous painting by Italian Early Renaissance artist Masaccio appears in the background. Because the painting contains nudity, Fox's network executives took issue with the scene, forcing the show to censor the painting. Paul Rabwin later noted that "the network executive censors didn't feel it was appropriate for us to show all the details ... [of] course, they could see people giving birth to hundreds of snakes ... That's OK." On the seventh season DVD special features, the painting is erroneously attributed to the famed Michelangelo.

== Broadcast and reception ==
"Signs and Wonders" first aired in the United States on January 23, 2000. This episode earned a Nielsen rating of 8.5, with a 12 share, meaning that roughly 8.5 percent of all television-equipped households, and 12 percent of households watching television, were tuned in to the episode. It was viewed by 13.86 million viewers. The episode aired in the United Kingdom and Ireland on Sky1 on April 30, 2000, and received 0.61 million viewers, making it the eighth most watched episode that week.

The episode received mixed reviews from critics. Kenneth Silber from Space.com wrote a very positive review of the episode, writing, "'Signs and Wonders' is a clever episode whose serpentine plot twists will leave many viewers genuinely surprised. Although a bit overly reliant on the alleged shock value of snakes, the episode establishes, more firmly than any before it, the demonic nature of some of the powers at work in The X-Files." Rich Rosell from Digitally Obsessed awarded the episode 5 out of 5 stars and called the episode, "one of the scariest episodes of season 7" before noting that the episode "really creeped me out." However, other reviews were more mixed. Robert Shearman, in his book Wanting to Believe: A Critical Guide to The X-Files, Millennium & The Lone Gunmen, rated it two-and-a-half stars out of five. The author noted that, despite several very "cool" images—such as Gracie birthing snakes and a man oozing reptile venom—the episode "doesn't really seem to stand for anything." Shearman further criticized putting "religion in the crosshair" and concluded that the episode was "just your everyday sliver of supernatural hokum."

Paula Vitaris from Cinefantastique gave the episode a mixed review and awarded it two stars out of four. Vitaris criticized the polarization of religion viewed in the episode, noting that "although 'Signs and Wonder's purports to be an examination of different modes of faith, it offers a pessimistic—and distorted view of religion." Tom Kessenich, in his book Examinations, gave the episode a mixed review, writing "I have always been the type of person who admires the creative attempt, even if the attempt isn't a complete success. […] This is precisely the mindset I'm feeling after watching 'Signs and Wonders'. I admire the attempt to spook me, to offer up conflicting views of religion and righteousness, even if I'm not completely sure what the point of it all was." Nevertheless, Kessenich praised the snake attack scenes and the episode's occasional quips of humor. Emily VanDerWerff of The A.V. Club awarded the episode a "C+". Despite writing that the snake attack scenes were "surprisingly horrifying" and that the episode contained "plenty [of elements] to recommend", she was critical about the lack of explanation behind Mackey. Although she had a positive opinion of the first 30 minutes, she wrote that the "last 10 minutes just sink everything good the episode has going, and in a way that hurts everything that came before."

== Bibliography ==
- Fraga, Erica (2010). LAX-Files: Behind the Scenes with the Los Angeles Cast and Crew. CreateSpace. ISBN 9781451503418.
- Hurwitz, Matt; Knowles, Chris (2008). The Complete X-Files. Insight Editions. ISBN 978-1-933784-80-9.
- Kessenich, Tom (2002). Examination: An Unauthorized Look at Seasons 6–9 of the X-Files. Trafford Publishing. ISBN 1-55369-812-6.
- Shapiro, Marc (2000). All Things: The Official Guide to the X-Files Volume 6. Harper Prism. ISBN 0-06-107611-2.
- Shearman, Robert (2009). Wanting to Believe: A Critical Guide to The X-Files, Millennium & The Lone Gunmen. Mad Norwegian Press. ISBN 978-0-9759446-9-1.
