= Samantha Mulder =

- Ashlyn Rose as Samantha Mulder in "Dreamland II"
- First appearance: "Conduit"
- Last appearance: "My Struggle" (photo)

Samantha Ann Mulder is a fictional character in the television series The X-Files. She is the younger sister of FBI Special Agent Fox Mulder and the daughter of Teena and Bill Mulder. As a child, Samantha was abducted, ostensibly by aliens, and was never returned. It is this experience that drives her older brother Fox Mulder to join the FBI, and later take the reins of the X-Files section.

== Character arc ==
On the evening of November 27, 1973, Samantha Mulder was apparently abducted by aliens from the Mulder family home on Martha's Vineyard, when she was 8 years old. Her older brother Fox Mulder, who was 12 years old at the time, witnessed the abduction that began his life-long obsession with finding the truth about extraterrestrials to shed light on this unexplained incident. Many episodes of the show focused on Mulder's determined efforts to discover what happened to his little sister and find out about her whereabouts or unveil her fate. However, many of Mulder's attempts had failed.

When a woman who claimed to be Samantha first reappeared 22 years later as an adult, she claimed that she lost her memory after her abduction and was adopted by a new family when the aliens returned her to Earth in 1979. She stated she had been gradually regaining her memory regarding her tragic childhood during the last year before finally reuniting with her real family and Mulder. This person was later revealed to be an imposter who was just one of the several adult Samantha clones, all of whom were killed by the Alien Bounty Hunter.

It is later stated that Samantha was taken as a hostage to ensure Bill Mulder's silence around the Syndicate's genetic experiments, and that the Mulders were forced to choose who would be abducted between Fox and Samantha.

Jeremiah Smith takes Mulder to a covert bee husbandry facility in remote Alberta. There, he finds a group of Samantha clones, all no older than the day the real Samantha originally disappeared in 1973. The clones had been working on the alien colonists' and Syndicate's joint project of spreading the black oil. The facility was soon after destroyed, and the clones were presumably killed by the Alien Bounty Hunter.

Later in the fourth season, Mulder becomes convinced that Samantha was kidnapped and murdered by John L. Roche. Roche is a serial killer whom Mulder previously profiled, and helped lock up for the murder of thirteen young girls. His signature was the removal of a heart-shaped piece of cloth from each girl's clothing. Through a dream, Mulder finds another girl, and the discovery of the missing "paper hearts" reveals that two are still missing, for a total of sixteen. Roche manipulates Mulder into believing that Samantha is one of his victims, taking him to the scene of the abduction to explain it. However, Mulder takes him to the wrong house and catches him in the lie. At the end of the episode Roche gives the location of one of the missing victims, but is shot and killed by Mulder during a standoff before revealing the location of the last body.

At the beginning of the fifth season, The Smoking Man introduced Mulder to a woman who he claims is, and who herself believes to be, Samantha. She tells Mulder that she has children of her own, thought that her mother had died some time ago, and believed the Cigarette Smoking Man to be her father. She leaves abruptly during the meeting, and is never seen again. According to Cassandra Spender, she was not the real Samantha, but actually another clone.

Samantha's true storyline is revealed and resolved in the seventh season episode, "Closure". In that episode, Dana Scully watches a 1989 tape in which Mulder undergoes hypnotic regression therapy, from which another agent describes his recollection of Samantha's abduction as a "garden-variety compensatory abduction fantasy" that feeds Mulder's "unconscious hope that his sister is still alive". Later, with the help of a medium, Mulder discovers that Samantha was raised by the Cigarette Smoking Man alongside Jeffrey Spender. They also uncover her old diary, which states that she was subjected to constant tests before she eventually ran away aged 14. Eventually, she was picked up by police as a wandering runaway and taken to Dominic Savio Memorial Hospital, suffering from paranoia and what authorities considered to be self-inflicted wounds. She gave no name or personal information and allowed no one but the emergency room nurse, Arbutus Ray, to touch her. Decades later, Ray informs Scully and Harold Pillar, the psychic, about the mysterious young girl (while Mulder stands nearby). Ray adds that a group of men (seemingly including the Cigarette Smoking Man) came to the hospital to claim the girl, only to find out upon their arrival that she was gone, taken by "spiritual intervention" beings called "Walk-ins", which try to save the innocent souls of children who are due to suffer terrible fates. Mulder concurrently learns of his sister's fate through a vision, and is relieved to learn she was saved through her death.

Samantha is mentioned again in the series finale, where Jeffrey Spender testifies at Mulder's trial he and Samantha grew up together at the military base and she died in 1979, and in The X-Files: I Want to Believe, being the inspiration that drives Mulder to try to save a likely-dead agent. Mulder is seen to admit she is dead, but keeps her picture on the wall with newspaper clippings of his own exploits with the FBI and alien evidence.

== Portrayal history ==
Samantha Mulder was played as a child by Vanessa Morley, and as an adult by Megan Leitch. Several other actresses played the part for individual episodes—Brianne Benitz in the first season's "Miracle Man", Ashlynn Rose in the sixth season's "Dreamland II", and Mimi Paley in the seventh season episode "Closure".

== Reception ==
Zack Handlen of The A.V. Club praised Samantha's apparent return in "Colony", saying that "In the seasons to come, we end up with enough Samantha's [sic] to fill a clown-car, but here, the reveal is shocking, effective, and unsettling".

David Bell and Lee-Jane Bennion-Nixon described Samantha's story as a classical conspiracy narrative, and a "long-running, episodic storyline is especially pivotal to the series", a driving force behind the actions of its main character, Fox Mulder.
