= Elegy (The X-Files) =

- The X-Files episode
- Scully encounters the spirit of a blond girl.
- Episode no.: Season 4 Episode 22
- Directed by: James Charleston
- Written by: John Shiban
- Production code: 4X22
- Original air date: May 4, 1997
- Running time: 44 minutes

Guest appearances
- Steven M. Porter as Harold Spuller; Alex Bruhanski as Angelo Pintero; Sydney Lassick as Chuck Forsch; Nancy Fish as Nurse Innes; Daniel Kamin as Detective Hudak; Lorena Gale as The Attorney; Mike Puttonen as Martin Alpert; Christine Willes as Karen Kosseff; Ken Tremblett as Uniformed Officer; Gerry Naim as Sergeant Conneff

Episode chronology
← Previous "Zero Sum"	Next → "Demons"
- The X-Files season 4

"Elegy" is the twenty-second episode of the fourth season of the American science fiction television series The X-Files. It was written by John Shiban and directed by James Charleston. The episode aired in the United States on May 4, 1997, on the Fox network. It is a "Monster-of-the-Week" story, a stand-alone plot which is unconnected to the series' wider mythology, although Scully's battle with cancer is an important plot point. "Elegy" earned a Nielsen rating of 10.6 and was seen by 17.1 million viewers upon its initial broadcast. The episode received mostly positive reviews from televisions critics; the performance of lead actress Gillian Anderson was especially praised.

The show centers on FBI special agents Fox Mulder (David Duchovny) and Dana Scully (Anderson) who work on cases linked to the paranormal, called X-Files. In this episode, Mulder and Scully track a series of murders that lead to a home for the mentally ill and a clue that makes no sense: each victim has appeared as an apparition in the area where their body was found along with the words "She is me". Shiban was inspired to write the episode based on an incident that involved his wife's father potentially seeing other beings in a room when he was dying. Shiban was also inspired by the 1975 film One Flew Over the Cuckoo's Nest.

== Plot ==
Angie Pintero (Alex Bruhanski), the owner of a bowling alley, tells one of his employees, an autistic man named Harold Spuller (Steven M. Porter), to go home for the evening. Shortly thereafter, Angie discovers a badly-injured blond girl wedged inside of the automated pinsetter. The girl attempts to speak, but no words come out of her mouth. Angie notices police in a nearby parking lot and rushes outside to get help. He realizes a crowd has gathered around the dead body of the same girl he saw only moments earlier in the bowling alley. Angie relates his bizarre tale to Fox Mulder (David Duchovny) and Dana Scully (Gillian Anderson). Mulder suspects that Angie encountered the dead girl's ghost; three similar encounters, and three similar murders, were reported in the area in as many weeks. The agents discover the words, "She is me" written on the bowling lane where Angie saw the spirit, but its meaning remains a mystery.

Detective Hudak (Daniel Kamin) tells Mulder and Scully that an anonymous caller phoned 911 with a message regarding Penny Timmons, one of the killer's victims. The caller claimed that Timmons' last words were "She is me." Hudak notes, however, that the victim's larynx was severed, making it impossible for her to utter dying words. The agents trace the source of the 911 call to a payphone at the New Horizon Psychiatric Center. Mulder notices one of the patients, Harold Spuller, avoiding his gaze. After viewing photographs of the murder victims, Scully comes to the conclusion that Spuller fits the killer's profile: a compulsive person consumed with the desire to organize, clean and reorder. Scully uses a rest room to attend to a nose bleed and there encounters the apparition of another young, blond girl. Moments later, Mulder tells her that the body of another victim was found nearby and Scully realizes it was the same girl she saw as an apparition. Scully decides to seek medical attention for her nosebleed but tells Mulder to remain and continue working on the case. In the meantime, the audience is made aware that Harold sees the apparitions of all of the young women recently murdered.

After having the nosebleed checked, Scully makes an appointment with an FBI psychiatrist in whom she confides that she has come to understand that she relies on Mulder far more than she ever realized and finds him to be a source of strength. Meanwhile, Mulder brings Harold to the police station for questioning and, during his interrogation, makes a connection between long strings of numbers Harold can recall on command to the bowling alley. Along with Hudak and Harold's attorney, Harold leads Mulder to a back room accessible from the bowling alley. The walls of the room are covered with score sheets, including those of the victims, and these are the strings of numbers Harold recalls. Mulder realizes Harold met each of the murdered women at the bowling alley, but Harold becomes greatly upset and, from his point of view, Angie's ghost is seen standing behind Mulder. Harold rushes out of the room and makes his way to the bowling alley, where Angie lies dead from a heart attack. Mulder approaches Scully, asking her to examine Harold, because every person who saw the apparitions was dying or about to die, which implies Harold may be next. Mulder also believes that Harold formed some kind of profound connection to the victims but was unable to express his feelings due to his Autism so a psychic connection formed between him and the murdered women. Scully, who also saw a victim's ghost, is struck by the implication but does not tell Mulder.

Harold is escorted back to the psychiatric center where he is tormented by Nurse Innes (Nancy Fish), a bully who seems to have a particular dislike for Harold. Later, Mulder finds Innes lying on the floor, half-conscious. Innes claims Harold went berserk and attacked her. Harold's roommate, Chuck Forsch, tells Scully that Nurse Innes warned Harold that she was poisoning him. Scully slowly realizes that Harold has probably not been taking his meds and that Innes, not Harold, was responsible for the murders. When Innes attacks Scully with a scalpel, Scully draws her weapon and fires, striking her in the shoulder. While summarizing the case with Mulder, Scully explains that Innes had been taking Harold's unused medication, triggering violent and unpredictable behavior. Scully hypothesizes that Innes—out of rage for her husband having left her for a younger woman—committed the murders in order to destroy happiness and the innocent affection Harold felt towards the young women. Later, Harold's body is discovered in a nearby alley, the apparent victim of respiratory failure. Scully, however, suspects that Harold died from what Innes took away from him. Scully admits to Mulder that she saw the ghost of the fourth victim shortly after she was murdered and the two have a short but intense discussion about trust and the fear they both share. Later, Scully sees Harold's spirit sitting in the back seat of her car.

== Production ==
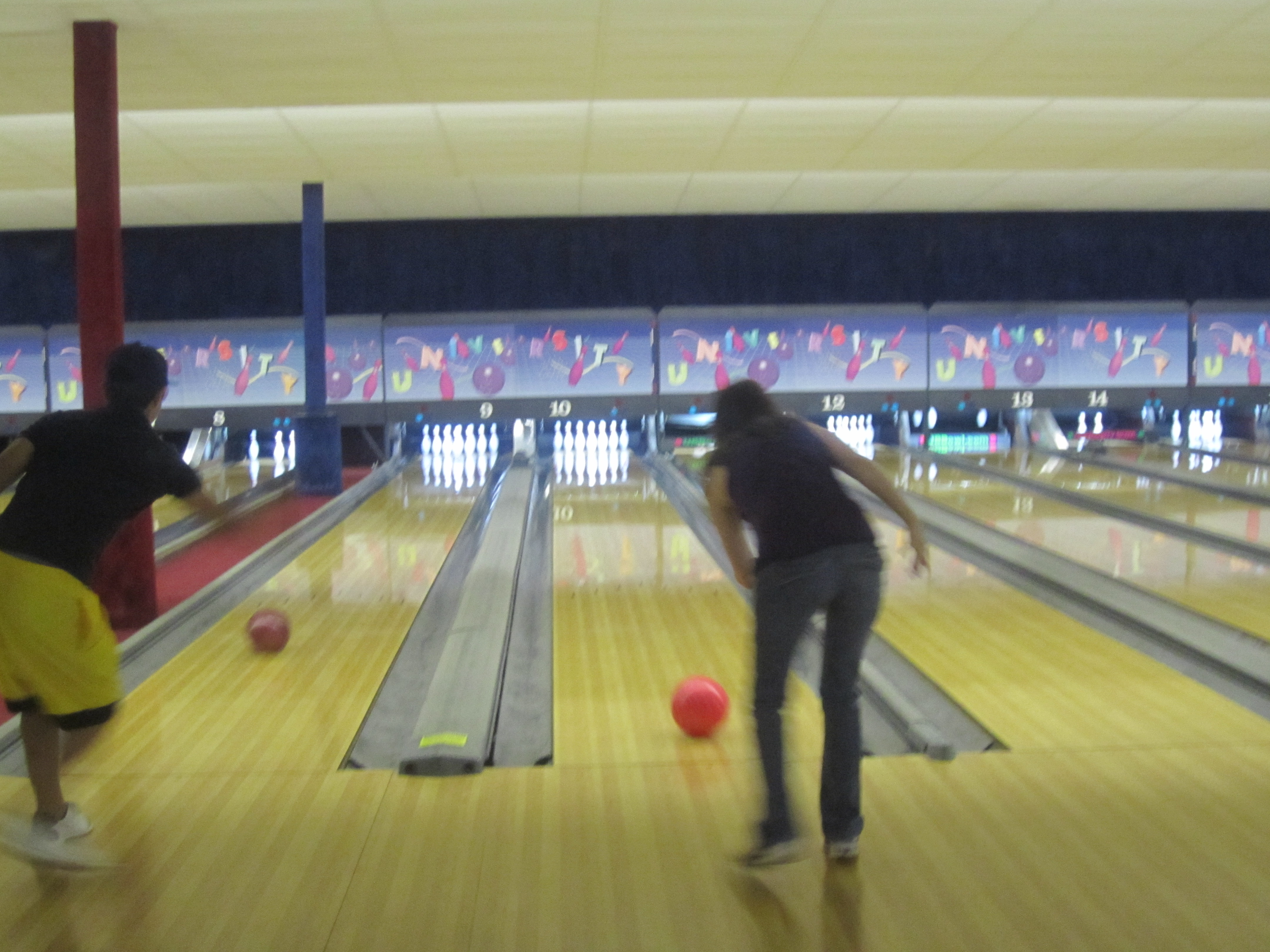
Several bowling alleys were scouted for the episode (Alley in San Antonio, Texas pictured).

"Elegy" was written by John Shiban and directed by James Charleston. Shiban was inspired to pen the episode after he and his future wife were visiting her dying father in a hospital. According to Shiban, his father-in-law kept looking around the room, as if gazing at other people; however, Shiban and his partner were the only visitors in the room. Eventually, Shiban's father-in-law asked the two who else was in the room, and when they responded that only they were visiting him, he seemed perplexed and kept looking around the room. Shiban began to wonder if "a dying person might be able to look through the cracks […] into the next world", which he developed into a story about a "haunted bowling alley" because "it just seemed right".

Harold Spuller was inspired by the 1975 film One Flew Over the Cuckoo's Nest starring Jack Nicholson as Randle McMurphy. Coincidentally, Spuller's friend in this episode, Chuck Forsch, is portrayed by actor Sydney Lassick, who had previously appeared in the movie as one of McMurphy's fellow patients. Steven M. Porter was friends with co-executive producer Frank Spotnitz, and due to this connection he was allowed to audition for a guest role on the show. Following his audition, Porter felt that he had "either made a great impression or a complete fool of myself". Porter used his experience in a play called Asylum to develop the various "gestures and tics" that Spuller has.

The production crew asked a number of bowling alleys if they would let the show film in their space, but many were reluctant, as it would require them to close down for three days and thereby lose revenue. Eventually, the Thunderbird Bowling Centre gave the show permission to film in their building, under the stipulation that the show leave the bowling surfaces as they were. This forced the production staff to either wear bowling shoes or wear makeshift "paper booties" on their feet so as to not scratch the wooden lanes. In between camera set ups, Duchovny and director Charleston bowled together; Duchovny later joked that after the episode, he "realized how old" he was because he felt sore from all the bowling; he joked, "When you get sore from bowling, it's time to start thinking about your life and where it's going."

== Reception ==
"Elegy" premiered on the Fox network on May 4, 1997. This episode earned a Nielsen rating of 10.6, with a 16 share, meaning that roughly 10.6 percent of all television-equipped households, and 16 percent of households watching television, were tuned in to the episode. "Elegy" was seen by 17.1 million viewers on first broadcast.

Robert Shearman, in his book Wanting to Believe: A Critical Guide to The X-Files, Millennium & The Lone Gunmen, rated the episode four stars out of five and called it "terrific". The author applauded Shiban's script, noting that it focused on "greater attention to the relationship between Mulder and Scully", rather than the X-File itself. He also called the shot where Scully sees the apparition in the bathroom "one of the most chilling things the series has offered this year", and noted that the part with Scully conferring with her counselor "is the highlight of the season". Paula Vitaris, writing for Cinefantastique, rated "Elegy" three stars out of four, writing that the X-File part of the episode "falls apart by the end" but that the installment is saved by "the emotional impact of Scully". Vitaris praised the acting of the cast, and especially lauded Anderson's performance, noting that she conveyed "the shock and confusion at witnessing the frightening sight of the ghostly girl with a cut throat".

Not all reviews were as positive. Emily St. James of The A.V. Club awarded the episode a "B−" and called it "alternately deeply moving and really, really stupid". Her main criticism of the episode was that it portrayed mental illness in a manner that was "offensive at worst and just plain idiotic at best". Furthermore, she derided the "magical mentally handicapped person" trope as "cringe-worthy" and cliche. St. James however, wrote that the episode was saved largely due to the "beautiful little scenes that let you see the weight of everything Scully's been carrying around her".

== Bibliography ==
- Gradnitzer, Louisa; Pittson, Todd (1999). X Marks the Spot: On Location with The X-Files. Arsenal Pulp Press. ISBN 1-55152-066-4.
- Meisler, Andy (1998). I Want to Believe: The Official Guide to the X-Files Volume 3. Harper Prism. ISBN 0061053864.
- Shearman, Robert (2009). Wanting to Believe: A Critical Guide to The X-Files, Millennium & The Lone Gunmen. Mad Norwegian Press. ISBN 978-0975944691.

This article incorporates material derived from the "Elegy" article on the X-Files wiki at Fandom (formerly Wikia) and is licensed under the Creative Commons Attribution-Share Alike 3.0 License (January 1, 2013).
