= The Amazing Maleeni =

- The X-Files episode
- The severed head of The Amazing Maleeni.
- Episode no.: Season 7 Episode 8
- Directed by: Thomas J. Wright
- Written by: Vince Gilligan; John Shiban; Frank Spotnitz
- Production code: 7ABX08
- Original air date: January 16, 2000
- Running time: 44 minutes

Guest appearances
- Ricky Jay as Herman/Albert Pinchbeck; Jonathan Levit as Billy LaBonge; Robert LaSardo as Cissy Alvarez; Jim Maniaci as Bullethead; Rick Marzan as Holding Cell Officer; Mark Chaet as Bank Officer; Dennis Keiffer as Bullethead; Dan Rice as Uniform Cop; Sherri Howard as Female Employee; J. David as Young Boss; Steven Barr as Courier Guard; Adam Vernier as Driver

Episode chronology
← Previous "Orison"	Next → "Signs and Wonders"
- The X-Files season 7

"The Amazing Maleeni" is the eighth episode of the seventh season of the science fiction television series The X-Files. It premiered on the Fox network in the United States on January 16, 2000. It was written by Vince Gilligan, John Shiban, and Frank Spotnitz and directed by Thomas J. Wright. The episode is a "Monster-of-the-Week" story, unconnected to the series' wider mythology. "The Amazing Maleeni" earned a Nielsen household rating of 9.4, being watched by 16.18 million people in its initial broadcast. The episode received mixed reviews.

The show centers on FBI special agents Fox Mulder (David Duchovny) and Dana Scully (Gillian Anderson) who work on cases linked to the paranormal, called X-Files. Mulder is a believer in the paranormal, while the skeptical Scully has been assigned to debunk his work. In this episode, The Amazing Maleeni, a small-time magician, performs an amazing feat to impress a heckler—he turns his head 360 degrees. So when he is later found without a head at all, Mulder and Scully arrive on the case and discover an angry ex-con, an unimpressed rival, and Maleeni’s twin brother. All seem to have something to do with a plan to rob a major bank.

Although written by Gilligan, Shiban, and Spotnitz, the story for "The Amazing Maleeni" was conceived largely by executive producer Frank Spotnitz, who had wanted to do an episode dealing with "magic and illusion" since the show's second season. Real-life magician Ricky Jay, who also was Spotnitz's favorite, was brought in to play the part of the titular Maleeni.

== Plot ==
At the Santa Monica Pier, a stage magician, The Amazing Maleeni, twists his head completely around at a carnival, while Billy LaBonge, another magician, heckles Maleeni during the event. After the show, the carnival manager comes to the window of Maleeni's van, where he is apparently sitting silently, prepared to leave. When the manager taps him to give him the afternoon fee, Maleeni's severed head falls completely off. Fox Mulder (David Duchovny) and Dana Scully (Gillian Anderson) question LaBonge, who says Maleeni was a charlatan, using cheap child's-level tricks. During the autopsy, Scully finds that, although Maleeni's head was cleanly cut off, he died of a heart attack. She also finds that he was dead for at least a month and refrigerated, even though the carnival manager spoke to him only minutes before his head fell off.

Meanwhile, LaBonge finds a bar owner named Cissy Alvarez, to whom Maleeni owed a large debt. LaBonge says that they shared a prison cell in the past, but Alvarez doesn't remember him. LaBonge says that he caused Maleeni's head to fall off, and that Alvarez will get the money owed if he helps him perform a magic trick. Mulder and Scully learn that Maleeni has an identical twin brother, Albert Pinchbeck, who works in a bank. Albert is even wearing a neckbrace, which he says he needs because of a car accident in Mexico. Mulder tells him he thinks he committed the decapitation, but Pinchbeck shows that he has no legs, which he also lost in the accident. After the agents leave, Alvarez comes into Pinchbeck's office and threatens to kill him if he does not get his money. LaBonge then frames Alvarez for a robbery by attacking an armored truck full of cash, disguised as Alvarez. Mulder soon finds out that Pinchbeck is the real Maleeni and that he faked having no legs. After confronting Pinchbeck, he admits that he faked his own death in order to get out of Alvarez's debt. Pinchbeck found his brother dead of a heart attack at home and used his body as a double. They promptly arrest Pinchbeck, as well as LaBonge, who waves around a gun in public precisely in order to be arrested. The two are put in jail for the night.

Mulder and Scully alert the bank manager to check the vault the next morning. They find it emptied of cash. The agents go to Alvarez's bar and find the money hidden above the ceiling. Later Mulder and Scully confront LaBonge and Maleeni as they are released on bail, when Mulder explains that he figured out their plan - LaBonge and Pinchbeck were not, in fact, enemies, and they had been working together to put Alvarez in prison for making LaBonge's life miserable in prison 8 years prior. As masters of sleight of hand and escapology, the two of them easily escaped, performed the robbery and transfer of money bags to the bar, and returned to their cells before being noticed.

After the two magicians make their exit, confident in the lack of evidence against them, Mulder reveals to Scully the true trick they planned to perform — that everything involving Alvarez was purely misdirection. Earlier, when checking whether Pinchbeck had stolen funds from the bank, the manager had told Mulder they would need his FBI badge number and thumb print to gain access to the Electronic Fund Transfer (EFT) system. Mulder shows Scully Maleeni's wallet, which he had taken from the Evidence room before confronting him and LaBonge. When the agents first met LaBonge, he had surreptitiously pickpocketed their badges as an example of his skill with sleight of hand, which gave him Mulder's badge number. Upon their first meeting with Pinchbeck impersonating his brother, Pinchbeck did a card trick with Mulder, leaving Mulder's prints on the card, which as Mulder displays, is securely in Maleeni's wallet. Mulder explains that the pair purposely acted in a high-profile manner to draw the attention of the FBI, and that if they had collected the badge number and thumbprint, they would have been able to perform EFTs. As Mulder and Scully leave the jail, Scully shows that she, too, has learned a trick, and turns her hand around 360 degrees in a similar fashion to what LaBonge did with his hand. Mulder asks Scully to explain how, and she brushes him off, saying simply "magic".

== Production ==
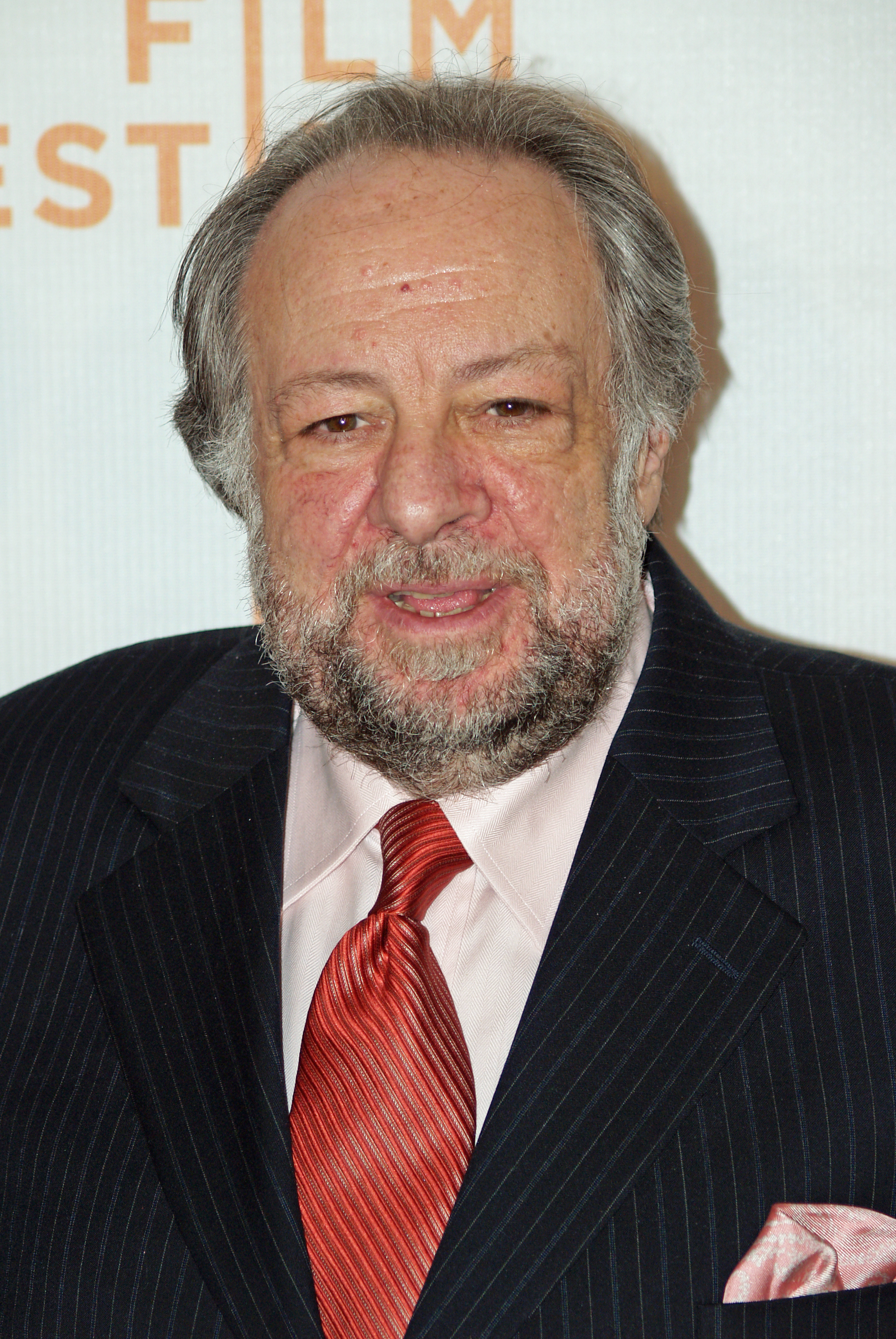
Noted magician Ricky Jay appeared in the episode.

=== Writing ===
"The Amazing Maleeni" was inspired by executive producer Frank Spotnitz's long-standing desire for an episode to deal solely with "magic and illusion"; Spotnitz had been championing this idea since he first joined the series' writing staff during season two. Eventually, during the seventh season, Vince Gilligan was assigned to write the episode, something he described as "agony". Gilligan explained, "The episode started with Frank, because he—for several years—had wanted to write an episode about magicians. Frank was a fan of the TV show The Magician with Bill Bixby so I believe that was part of it, but Frank was interested in the idea of magic and the idea of fooling people who wished to be fooled."

Spotnitz's favorite magician, Ricky Jay, was sought for the part of The Amazing Maleeni. Unfortunately, the crew discovered that neither Jay nor the show's back-up magician, David Blaine, were available for shooting. Series creator Chris Carter, however, later stated that the show would not take no for an answer: "We got on the phone with him. He agreed to come to our offices to talk about the script and ended up doing some card tricks for us that reduced Frank and I to being six-year-olds again." After discussion, Jay agreed to guest star in the episode with the stipulation that he only be asked to do the tricks he was accustomed to doing. Gilligan, in retrospect, later noted, "There was no choice other than Ricky Jay as far as we were concerned. He was not looking forward to the idea of playing a magician because I think he felt that magicians were never portrayed very realistically in movies or television shows."

The cast and crew of the episode enjoyed the "amusement park" feel of the story. Gillian Anderson later noted, "Because of all the magic, I was constantly being entertained. The difficulty with something like this is you have tendency to forget that people are still having bad things happen to them." Anderson later stated that she and Duchovny "had to keep reminding [them]selves that [they] were dealing with a murder", even though many of their lines were supposed to be flippantly delivered.

=== Special effects ===
The episode used several special effects, although in order to ensure that the episode felt "camera-real", many of the more intense effects were performed through conventional rather than digital means. For instance, the scene wherein Bill LaBonge's hand erupted into flames was created with the help of a stunt man, rather than through expensive and, ultimately, "less convincing" CGI effects. The scene featuring The Amazing Maleeni turning his head 360 degrees was created using a prosthetic head, courtesy of John Vulich's Optic Nerve Studios.

== Broadcast and reception ==
"The Amazing Maleeni" first aired in the United States on January 16, 2000. This episode earned a Nielsen rating of 9.4, with a 14 share, meaning that roughly 9.4 percent of all television-equipped households, and 14 percent of households watching television, were tuned in to the episode. It was viewed by 16.18 million viewers. The episode aired in the United Kingdom and Ireland on Sky1 on May 7, 2000 and received 0.79 million viewers, making it the fourth most watched episode that week.

The episode received mixed reviews from critics. Kenneth Silber from Space.com was critical of the episode's intricacy, writing, "'The Amazing Maleeni' is a convoluted episode that ultimately lacks verve and excitement. Even if one can figure out what is going on, there remains the question of how much, or even whether, to care." Robert Shearman, in his book Wanting to Believe: A Critical Guide to The X-Files, Millennium & The Lone Gunmen, rated it two stars out of five. He noted that, had the episode used real magic tricks instead of "resort[ing] to CGI, the episode would have been much more than a simple 'cheat'". Furthermore, Shearman criticized how Maleeni turning his head around 360 degrees was never satisfactorily explained. Paula Vitaris from Cinefantastique gave the episode a mixed review and awarded it two stars out of four. Vitaris compared the episode's plot to the 1999 movie Arlington Road, noting that while "the scheme is fun to watch while it unfolds, […] in the end, it's not credible; too much is left open to chance for it really to happen." Rich Rosell from Digitally Obsessed awarded the episode 4 out of 5 stars. Although he noted that the episode was "not Gilligan's best work" and that the writing was "a little spotty", he said "the vibe [of 'The Amazing Maleeni'] is very well done." Zack Handlen of The A.V. Club awarded the episode a "B+" and wrote that he "love[d] it". He praised the episode's "good-naturedness", which he felt was due to Mulder and Scully's interaction. Handlen also enjoyed the writing, noting that the "script also does a good job at doling out its secrets in a way that never makes either the magicians or our heroes come off as idiots". Paul Spragg of Xposé wrote positively of the episode, describing it as a "rather fun tale".

== Bibliography ==
- Hurwitz, Matt; Knowles, Chris (2008). The Complete X-Files. Insight Editions. ISBN 978-1-933784-80-9.
- Shapiro, Marc (2000). All Things: The Official Guide to the X-Files Volume 6. Harper Prism. ISBN 0-06-107611-2.
- Shearman, Robert (2009). Wanting to Believe: A Critical Guide to The X-Files, Millennium & The Lone Gunmen. Mad Norwegian Press. ISBN 978-0-9759446-9-1.
