= Paper Hearts =

- The X-Files episode
- Episode no.: Season 4 Episode 10
- Directed by: Rob Bowman
- Written by: Vince Gilligan
- Production code: 4X08
- Original air date: December 15, 1996
- Running time: 44 minutes

Guest appearances
- Mitch Pileggi as Walter Skinner; Vanessa Morley as Samantha Mulder; Rebecca Toolan as Teena Mulder; Tom Noonan as John Lee Roche; Byrne Piven as Frank Sparks; Carly McKillip as Caitlin; Edward Diaz as El Camino Owner; Jane Perry as Care Operator; Paul Bittante as Local Cop

Episode chronology
← Previous "Terma"	Next → "El Mundo Gira"
- The X-Files season 4

"Paper Hearts" is the tenth episode of the fourth season of the American science fiction television series The X-Files. It premiered on the Fox network on December 15, 1996. It was written by Vince Gilligan, directed by Rob Bowman, and featured guest appearances by Tom Noonan, Rebecca Toolan and Vanessa Morley. The episode is a "Monster-of-the-Week" story, although it is tangentially connected to the series' wider mythology. "Paper Hearts" was viewed by 16.59 million people in its initial broadcast, and received positive reviews, with critics praising Noonan's guest role.

The show centers on FBI special agents Fox Mulder (David Duchovny) and Dana Scully (Gillian Anderson), who work on cases linked to the paranormal, called X-Files. Mulder is a believer in the paranormal, and the skeptical Scully has been assigned to debunk his work. In this episode, Mulder and Scully find that a child killer (Tom Noonan) who Mulder had helped to apprehend several years earlier had claimed more victims than he had confessed to; the resulting investigation uncovers a possible link to the disappearance of Mulder's sister, Samantha.

Gilligan developed the concept for "Paper Hearts" when thinking about the series' longest running storyline, the abduction of Samantha Mulder; he created a story questioning whether Samantha had not been abducted by aliens, but was rather murdered by a child killer instead. "Paper Hearts" was written specifically with Tom Noonan in mind for the role of Roche, and was among the first television work the actor had done.

== Plot ==
Fox Mulder (David Duchovny) dreams of a red light that leads him to the corpse of a young girl buried in a park in Manassas, Virginia. When he awakens, he heads to the park and finds the girl's skeleton. The girl was determined to have been murdered by John Lee Roche (Tom Noonan), a serial killer who murdered thirteen girls throughout the 1980s; his modus operandi included cutting a heart out of the clothes of each victim. Mulder had captured Roche by deducing that he committed the murders while traveling as a vacuum cleaner salesman. Roche's hearts were never found, although he confessed to all of the murders.

Dana Scully's (Gillian Anderson) autopsy of the skeleton finds that the victim died in 1975, suggesting that Roche's killing spree started much earlier than the FBI had previously thought. The agents search Roche's old car, where they discover sixteen cut-out hearts. Mulder and Scully subsequently visit Roche in prison, hoping to learn the identities of the remaining two victims. Roche, however, tries to play mind games with Mulder. That night Mulder dreams of the night of Samantha's abduction, seemingly showing that his sister was abducted by Roche rather than aliens.

The next day, Mulder asks Roche where he was the night Samantha was abducted. Roche claims he was on Martha's Vineyard and had sold a vacuum cleaner to Mulder's father. Mulder later finds the vacuum in his mother's house. After convincing Walter Skinner to grant them further access to Roche, the agents question the killer and are told the location of one of his remaining victims. He also claims exactly what happened the night of Samantha's abduction. An autopsy of the body reveals it does not belong to Samantha. Roche tells Mulder the final body is Samantha's, but says that he will only reveal where it is if Mulder takes him to the scene of her abduction. Mulder secretly releases Roche from prison and brings him to Martha's Vineyard.

Upon arriving at his family's old summer house, Roche explains exactly what happened the night of Samantha's abduction. However, Mulder tells him that the house was bought by his father after Samantha's abduction, convincing him that Roche is not telling the truth. Mulder plans to bring Roche back to prison, but—following another dream about Samantha—awakens to find Roche gone, with his badge, gun, and phone stolen.

Using Mulder's credentials, Roche kidnaps a girl in Swampscott, Massachusetts, whom he met on his flight with Mulder to Boston. Scully and Skinner arrive and the agents head to the site of Roche's old apartment in Revere. They find him with the girl in an abandoned bus nearby. Roche holds a gun on the girl and tells Mulder that he'll never know for sure whether the last victim is Samantha or not if he kills him. As Roche starts to pull the trigger, Mulder shoots him dead. In his office, Mulder stares at the final cloth heart and puts it away, unsure of whether it belonged to Samantha or not.

== Production ==
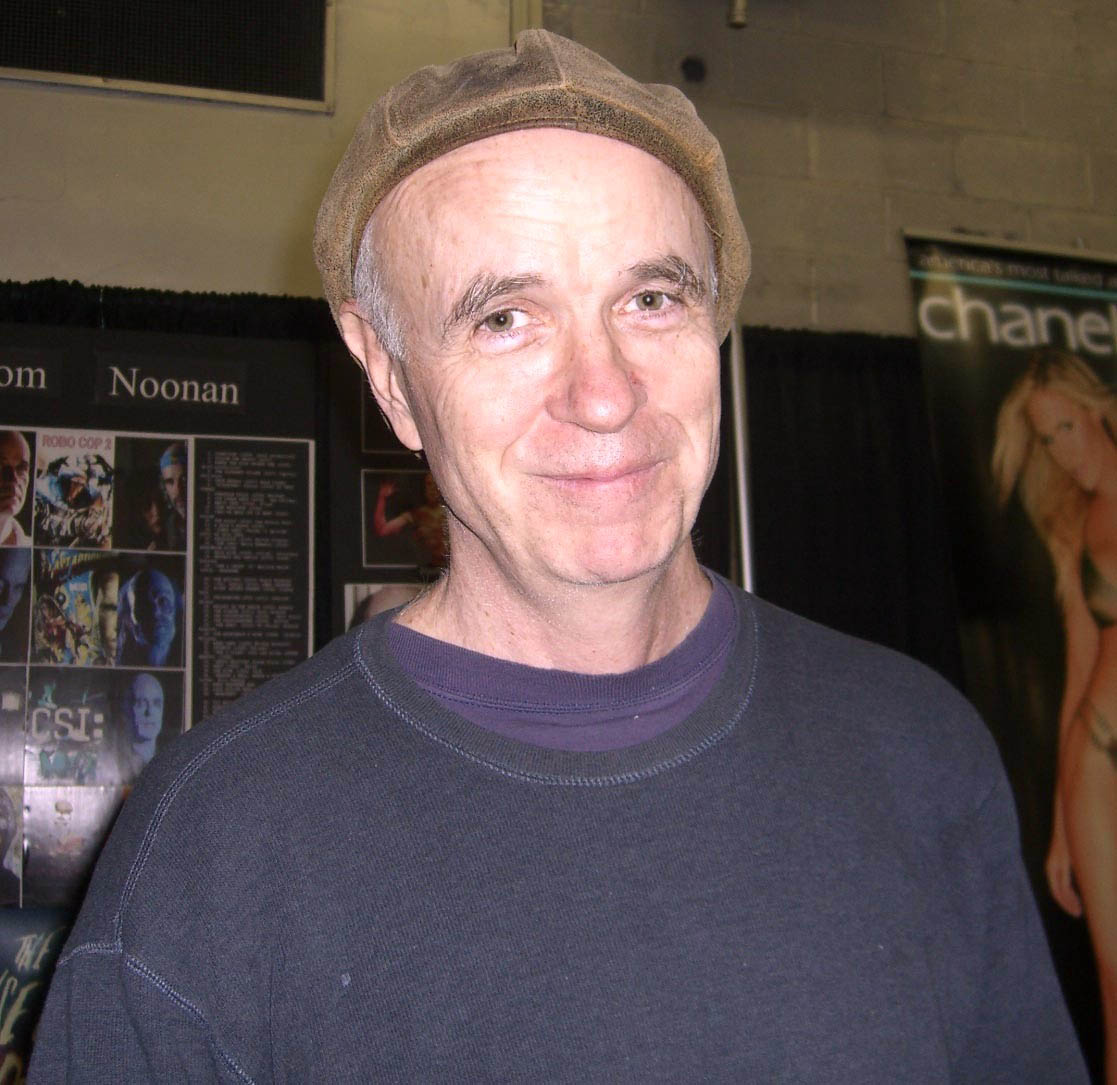
"Paper Hearts" was written specifically with Tom Noonan in mind for the role of John Lee Roche.

"Paper Hearts" was written specifically with Tom Noonan in mind for the role of Roche, and was amongst the first television work the actor had done. Noonan later recounted that "[the] crew really loves the show, and loves working on it... So it was really fun to do." Writer Vince Gilligan came up with the concept for the episode when thinking about the series' longest running storyline, the abduction of Samantha Mulder. Gilligan came up with a story questioning whether Samantha had not been abducted by aliens, but was rather murdered by a child killer instead. He decided to help convince Fox Mulder of this through a series of prophetic dreams. The laser lights in Mulder's dreams were influenced by Gilligan's experience with laser holograms while he was a film student. The laser was supposed to be the color blue, but was changed to red in production to reduce costs. Wanting to include some kind of fetish for the killer, Gilligan settled on having Roche cut heart-shaped fragments from his victim's clothing, thinking that having him mutilate his victims' bodies would be going too far.

Guest actor Tom Noonan, who played the killer John Lee Roche, recalled filming the scene in which his character is introduced, playing basketball in prison. Noonan, a capable basketball player, was asked to "downplay" how well he could play; he regretted not being able to play against David Duchovny, who had played basketball for Princeton University. Episode writer Vince Gilligan and director Rob Bowman assert that Duchovny's successful basketball shot in this scene was filmed in just one take, without special effects. While the episode was the eighth produced in the season, it was the tenth aired, having been delayed to free up production resources for the two part episodes "Tunguska" and "Terma". The episode's climactic scene was filmed in a "bus graveyard" in Surrey, British Columbia, a location which had been scouted months previously with the intention of eventually including it in an episode of the series, although filming at the location did not even last a full day despite the long wait to use it.

== Broadcast and reception ==
"Paper Hearts" premiered on the Fox network on December 15, 1996. The episode's initial broadcast was viewed by approximately 16.59 million people, which represented 16% of the viewing audience during that time.

Both Gillian Anderson and David Duchovny consider this among the best episodes of the fourth season. Composer Mark Snow was nominated for an Emmy Award for the music he produced for this episode. He said of the episode's music, "It was a different kind of texture for the show. Light, magic, nothing terribly threatening". Snow received many requests for a recording of the music used at the end of the episode.

Website IGN named "Paper Hearts" their sixth favorite standalone episode of the show, calling it "creepy and unsettling", and claiming Noonan's character was "one of the most disturbing villains to make an appearance in the series". Noonan's acting has also been praised by Vince Gilligan, who says the "understated" manner in which Roche is portrayed "sends chills down [his] spine every time". The A.V. Club's Emily VanDerWerff reviewed the episode positively, rating it an A and calling Noonan's performance "terrific", noting that the actor "makes Roche into one of the series' great human monsters"; and that the episode's premise was important to developing the character of Mulder further. The website later named the episode the sixth best example of a television dream sequence, noting that it "suggest[s] how this methodical man [Mulder] might puzzle over cold cases in his subconscious". The article also complimented the entry's metaphor that laser pointers were Mulder's mind that pointed "out bits of evidence his conscious brain missed all those many years ago." Starpulse named it the second best episode of the series.

== Bibliography ==
- Gradnitzer, Louisa; Pittson, Todd (1999). X Marks the Spot: On Location with The X-Files. Arsenal Pulp Press. ISBN 1-55152-066-4.
- Meisler, Andy (1998). I Want to Believe: The Official Guide to the X-Files Volume 3. Harper Prism. ISBN 0-06-105386-4.
