= Ruth Montgomery =

American reporter, writer, and claimed psychic

Ruth Shick Montgomery (June 11, 1912 – June 10, 2001) was a journalist with a long and distinguished career as a reporter, correspondent, and syndicated columnist in Washington, DC.

Later in life she transitioned to a career as a psychic and authored a number of books on metaphysical and New Age subjects. The polar shift of the early 21st century was among many predictions made by a spirit guide group from whom she regularly translated messages. She was a biographer of paranormal medium Jeane Dixon and a protégée of Arthur Ford, who claimed that he, like Edgar Cayce, could access the Akashic Records (or database) of the Universe.

== Journalism ==
Montgomery began her long journalism profession as a cub reporter for Waco-News-Tribune while receiving her education at Baylor University (1930–1935). Later she graduated from Purdue University (1934) and began work as a reporter on the Louisville Herald-Post.

In 1943, she became the first female reporter in the Washington bureau of the New York Daily News, and embarked on her extensive Washington, DC career. She covered notable foreign affairs (the Berlin Airlift among them), was a syndicated columnist for Hearst Headlines and United Press International and was a well-read correspondent with the International News Service.

At Franklin D. Roosevelt's funeral, Montgomery was the only female of the 12 invited reporters. In 1950, while a reporter for the New York Daily News, she was voted president of the Women's National Press Club. In 1959, she was a member of then Vice-president Richard Nixon's press corps on his tour of Russia. Montgomery wrote of her 25 years covering Washington in her 1970 book, "Hail to the Chiefs; My Life and Times with Six Presidents".

Montgomery wrote annual newspaper columns listing predictions by psychic Jeane Dixon beginning in 1952. In 1962, "Once There was a Nun: Mary McCarran's Years as Sister Mary Mercy" was published and thus began Montgomery's long career as a non-fiction author. In 1965 her book, "A Gift of Prophecy" about Jeane Dixon was published and became a best-seller, selling over 3 million copies.

Montgomery retired from her journalism career in 1969. As part of their Texas Collection, the Archives Division at Baylor University contains a research collection which include papers of Montgomery.

She held honorary doctor of law degrees from Baylor University and Ashland College.

== New Age writing ==
Soon after meeting celebrity medium Arthur Ford, Montgomery began automatic writing, first with a pencil and later with a typewriter, and said she was able to communicate with Ford after his passing. These post-mortem communications became the basis for a lengthy series of books which resulted in her achieving minor celebrity status, when Montgomery became a regular on the morning talk show circuit. During the 1960s and 1970s she became a household name.

Montgomery, whose prolific New Age writings earned her a loyal and enthusiastic following, believed her mission on Earth was to educate the public regarding her views on life after death, which is not uncommon among spiritualists. She also studied reincarnation and came to believe that mental and physical illnesses often have their origins in past lives. Montgomery wrote of such things as birth marks indicating the possible sites of past life injuries and commented that often children born with serious defects or illnesses are in fact repaying debts incurred in previous existences. Her books sometimes discussed the past lives of the famous among her contemporaries, stating that Ernest Hemingway had once been a Hun warrior and that in a previous incarnation Jacqueline Kennedy was a famed French queen.

Montgomery was a believer in the existence of extraterrestrial contact and documented meetings she had with non-human aliens on a number of occasions, particularly when she resided in Mexico in the 1970s.

With other like-minded mystics, Montgomery founded the Association for Past Life Research and Therapy. Her many books (allegedly channeled via automatic writing from her spirit guides) popularized spiritualist notions in public consciousness in the 1960s through the 1990s, and paved the way for what is now known as the New Age movement. Montgomery is particularly noted for documenting the walk-in theory whereby a person's soul can depart a hurt or anguished body and be replaced with a new soul which overtakes the body. In her writings she presented an extensive list of present-day and historical individuals she said were examples of "walk-ins" including several US presidents.

== Past life regression ==
In her book A World Beyond, Montgomery revealed that in a past incarnation she had been alive during the time of Christ and known as Lazarus' third sister Ruth, who is not mentioned in the Bible. As this woman, Montgomery claims to have witnessed Jesus' circumcision.

== Predictions ==
Echoing the earlier predictions of Edgar Cayce, Montgomery believed that ancient advanced civilizations of Mu and Atlantis had destroyed themselves thousands of years in the pre-history of modern man. Montgomery claimed we would see remnants of the lost continent of Atlantis rise from the sea after a "Polar Shift" which she foretold coming to pass in 1999.

Montgomery predicted in the 1970s (with the help of her supposed spirit guides) that World War III would begin in the mid-1980s when a brush-fire conflict, started by Ethiopian strongman Mengistu Haile Mariam, would spread first to the Middle East, and then Europe. Montgomery's "guides" stated that humans have free will and can make their own decisions regarding their destiny, and after the failure of her predictions regarding global strife, she attributed her error to this cause.

Montgomery also predicted that Ronald Reagan would be a one-term President to be followed in 1984 by a big-spending Democrat, and that in the 1970s and 1980s, America would have a "walk-in" as president in the 199 ("unsure which term, 1992 or 1996") before a Polar Shift, which was to happen "in the last months of the century" would eradicate most human life on Earth, and greatly alter existing coastlines.

The Guides predicted in her 1999 book The World To Come that the walk-in president would not come until 2008 at the earliest, and therefore the Shift would be delayed until 2010–2012 at least. The potential catastrophe of the shift was also reduced by human free will. Except for Florida and the coast of California, the Guides reported, most of America will survive, a direct contradiction of Montgomery's earlier forecast of significant global destruction in the coming event.

== Influence in popular culture ==
Montgomery's book "Aliens Among Us" has been cited by Sammy Hagar as the inspiration for the 1985 Van Halen song "Love Walks In". The book's account of benevolent aliens residing on earth in human form for the purpose of assisting humanity during a critical time is the template for speculation in UFOlogy communities. Alleged extraterrestrial candidates include far-reaching public figures such as technology visionary Steve Jobs, psychic medium Danielle Egnew and the Dalai Lama.

== Bibliography ==
Montgomery was a prolific writer on the subject of clairvoyance, reincarnation, past life regression, psychic phenomena, and clandestine extraterrestrials, most of which were sold as popular mass market paperbacks.

Once There was a Nun: Mary McCarran's years as Sister Mary Mercy (Putnam, 1962)

Mrs. LBJ (Avon, 1964)

A Gift of Prophecy: The Phenomenal Jeane Dixon (William Morrow & Company, 1965) first appeared in a condensed version as story in Reader's Digest entitled "The Crystal Ball" (July 1965).

A Search for the Truth (William Morrow & Company, 1967)

Flowers at the White House (1967)

Here and Hereafter (Coward, McCann & Geoghegan, 1968)

Companions Along the Way (Coward, McCann & Geoghegan, 1970)

Hail to the Chiefs: My Life and Times with Six Presidents (Coward, McCann & Geoghegan, 1970)

A World Beyond: A Startling Message from the Eminent Psychic Arthur Ford from Beyond the Grave (Coward, McCann & Geoghegan, 1971)

Born to Heal: The Astonishing Story of Mr. A and the Ancient Art of Healing with Life Energies (Coward, McCann & Geoghegan, 1973)

Companions Along the Way (Coward, McCann & Geoghegan, 1974)

The World Before (Coward, McCann & Geoghegan, 1976)

Strangers Among Us: Enlightened Beings from a World to Come (Coward, McCann & Geoghegan, 1978)

Threshold to Tomorrow (Putnam, 1983)

Aliens Among Us (Putnam, 1985)

Ruth Montgomery: Herald of the New Age (Fawcett, 1987)

The World to Come: the Guides' Long-Awaited Predictions for the Dawning Age (Harmony, 1999)

== See also ==
- List of newspaper columnists
- List of American print journalists
