= Walk-in (concept) =

New Age concept

A walk-in is a New Age concept of a person whose original soul has departed their body and has been replaced with a new, different, soul. It can also refer to a soul without a human body that enters a body with a soul, with the two souls subsequently sharing that one body. An example of this is the concept of twin flames. If one dies, they may return to share the body alongside their living twin. Ruth Montgomery popularized the concept in her 1979 book Strangers Among Us.

== Beliefs ==
Believers maintain that it is possible for the original soul of a human to leave a person's body and for another soul to "walk in". In Montgomery's work, souls are said to "walk in" during a period of intense personal problems on the part of the departing soul, or during or because of an accident or trauma. Some other walk-ins describe their entry as occurring based on prior agreement and when the previous soul was "complete". The walk-in being/individual retains the memories of the original personality, but does not have emotions associated with the memories. As they integrate, they bring their own mental, emotional, spiritual consciousness and evolve the life to resonate with their purpose and intentions. Incarnating into a fully grown body allows the walk-in soul to engage in embodiment without having to go through the two decades of maturation that humans need to reach adulthood. A walk-in soul also does not experience the conditioning of childhood and has a different relationship to life because they were not born.

== In popular culture ==
The 1941 film Here Comes Mr. Jordan and the 1978 remake Heaven Can Wait portrays one soul replacing a recently deceased man's soul and reviving to inhabit his body.

The Hawkgirl comics, the K-PAX series of books and film, and the Twilight Zone episode "The Last Rites of Jeff Myrtlebank" have all featured situations similar or identical to walk-in experiences, although the term "walk-in" is not used.

In the DC Comics storyline The Death of Superman, four new superheroes appeared following Superman's death. Among them was John Henry Irons, who called himself the "Man of Steel". Irons never claimed to be the real Superman, but Lois Lane speculated that if Superman were really dead, his soul may have moved into Irons' body, mentioning walk-ins explicitly.

The X-Files episode "Red Museum" discusses walk-ins, described by Fox Mulder as enlightened spirits who have taken possession of the bodies of people who have lost hope and who want to leave their life. The concept is revisited in the episodes "Sein Und Zeit" and "Closure".

In the TV series Ghost Whisperer, the season 4 episode "Threshold" used the term "step-in" when the soul of one of the series' main characters, who had died in the previous episode, enters the body of a man who dies in an unrelated accident.

Stephen King speaks of "walk-ins" several times in books 6 and 7 of The Dark Tower novels, but King's walk-ins are usually physical travellers, or - when they possess another's body - are more guests, sharing the body with the original mind as strangers. John Callum mentions them in The Dark Tower VI: Song of Susannah. The term is also used in the CODA section of this book. In The Talisman, cowritten by King, the concept of "Twinners" is presented in a similar manner: Twinners are separate but fundamentally similar individuals that live parallel existences on Earth and in the world of the Territories. If either or both of the pair gain awareness of their Twinner, they can learn to occupy the other's body in their respective worlds in style of a walk-in.

The main character Myne in Ascendance of a Bookworm is a walk-in. Originally a light novel, the story was released in anime format October 2019.

== See also ==
- Avatar – Incarnation of a god on Earth in Hinduism
- Lobsang Rampa – English writer (1910–1981)
- Mind uploading – Hypothetical process of digitally emulating a brain
- Multiplicity (subculture)#Definition – Individuals with multiple personalities
- Reincarnation – Concept of rebirth in different physical form
- Spirit possession – Purported control of a human body by spirits, ghosts, demons
- Star people (New Age) – People who believe they are aliens
- Tulpa – Entity manifesting from mental powers
