= Dreamland (The X-Files) =

- The X-Files episodes
- Fox Mulder sees his reflection in the mirror after switching bodies with a Man in Black, Morris Fletcher.
- Episode nos.: Season 6 Episodes 4 & 5
- Directed by: Rob Bowman ("Dreamland"); Michael Watkins ("Dreamland II")
- Written by: Vince Gilligan; John Shiban; Frank Spotnitz
- Production codes: 6ABX04; 6ABX05
- Original air dates: November 29, 1998 ("Dreamland"); December 6, 1998 ("Dreamland II")
- Running time: 45 minutes (per episode)

Guest appearances
- Michael McKean as Morris Fletcher; Nora Dunn as JoAnne Fletcher; Dara Hollingsworth as Christine Fletcher; Tyler Binkley as Terry Fletcher; James Pickens, Jr. as Assistant Director Alvin Kersh; Michael B. Silver as Howard Grodin; John Mahon as General Wegman; Scott Allan Campbell as Jeff Smoodge; Julia Vera as Mrs. Lana Chee; Christopher Stapleton as Capt. Robert McDonough; Eddie Jackson as Copilot; Ted White as Attendant; Laura Leigh Hughes as Kersh's Assistant; Freeman Michaels as Guard; Cesar Lopapa as Soldier; Tom Braidwood as Melvin Frohike; Dean Haglund as Richard Langly; Bruce Harwood as John Fitzgerald Byers; Andrew Sikking as Soldier; Chris Ufland as Sam; Mike Rad as Randy; Lisa Joann Thompson as Kelly

Episode chronology
← Previous "Triangle"	Next → "How the Ghosts Stole Christmas"

"Dreamland" is the title of both the fourth and fifth episodes of the sixth season of the science fiction television series The X-Files. Part one first aired on November 29, and part two aired on December 6, 1998, on Fox in the United States and Canada. The episode was written by Vince Gilligan, John Shiban, and Frank Spotnitz, and directed by Rob Bowman ("Dreamland") and Michael Watkins ("Dreamland II"). Although dealing with a member of the Men in Black, the episode is largely unconnected to the mythology of The X-Files, and is a "Monster-of-the-Week" story. Part one of "Dreamland" earned a Nielsen household rating of 10.1, being watched by 17.48 million people in its initial broadcast; Part two received a rating of 10 and was watched by 17.01 million people. The episode received mostly mixed reviews from critics, with many reviews critical of the episode's reliance on humor.

The show centers on FBI special agents Fox Mulder (David Duchovny) and Dana Scully (Gillian Anderson) who work on cases linked to the paranormal, called X-Files. Mulder is a believer in the paranormal, while the skeptical Scully has been assigned to debunk his work. In these episodes, Mulder and Scully visit Area 51. But when the agents witness the flight of a mysterious craft, Mulder and a member of the Men in Black switch bodies, unbeknownst to the others. In part two, Scully begins to suspect that her partner's strange behavior is more than it appears to be, while Mulder fights to return his life to normal before it is too late.

"Dreamland" was the only non-mythology story to be spread across two episodes. Originally, the writers for the episode contacted Garry Shandling to play the part of Fletcher but he was unavailable for filming. Michael McKean was then cast in his place. The episode is notable for a scene featuring Mulder-as-Fletcher encountering his reflection and proceeding to do the dance from the 1933 Marx Brothers comedy film Duck Soup. The scene required Duchovny and McKean to synchronize their movements perfectly. Dreamland is one of the names used for the Area 51 facility.

== Plot ==
=== Part one ===
Fox Mulder (David Duchovny) and Dana Scully (Gillian Anderson) travel to Area 51 in Nevada after receiving a tip concerning alien spacecraft. After being stopped by soldiers led by Man in Black Morris Fletcher (Michael McKean), a mysterious craft flies overhead. Suddenly, a bright light passes over them, which causes Mulder and Fletcher to swap bodies, although no one else initially realizes what has happened.

Mulder, now trapped in Fletcher's body, is taken to Area 51 and then to Fletcher's home. He learns that the craft's fly by caused other anomalies, such as a pilot being fused with a rock and a military captain swapping bodies with an elderly Hopi woman. Meanwhile, Fletcher, in Mulder's body, returns with Scully to FBI headquarters. When he displays little interest in the X-files, she becomes suspicious.

Mulder calls Scully and tries to explain the body swap. Initially, she does not believe him, although after discovering a penny and dime fused together near Area 51, she begins to question what is going on. When Mulder tries to again convince her of his identity, Fletcher has him exposed as the supposed source of the Area 51 leak. When military police arrive to arrest Mulder, he points out that the real Mulder would never betray an informant. This causes Scully to reconsider his story.

=== Part two ===
While pretending to accept that Fletcher is Mulder, Scully begins investigating the body swap. Meanwhile, Mulder manages to bluff his way back into Area 51, where he finds Fletcher's wife, Joanne, and tells her the truth; unfortunately, she assumes he is having a mid-life crisis. Elsewhere, Scully confronts Fletcher and forces him to arrange a meeting with the informant who had leaked information about the spacecraft. The leaks revealed to be General Wegman, who admits that he sabotaged the craft's stealth system so Mulder could see it, which accidentally caused the reality-altering effects. He explains that even the military does not know where this craft came from or how it works.

Mulder and Scully begin to worry that the body swap is permanent, but soon the distortion caused by the craft begins correcting itself. The correction eventually overtakes Mulder, Scully, and Fletcher, returning Mulder and Fletcher to their own bodies and rewriting the preceding days. Mulder and Scully then find themselves back at their original encounter outside Area 51, but this time, the craft does not appear. Though the people involved in the switch no longer remember what happened, Scully later discovers that she still is in possession of the fused coins.

== Production ==
=== Casting ===
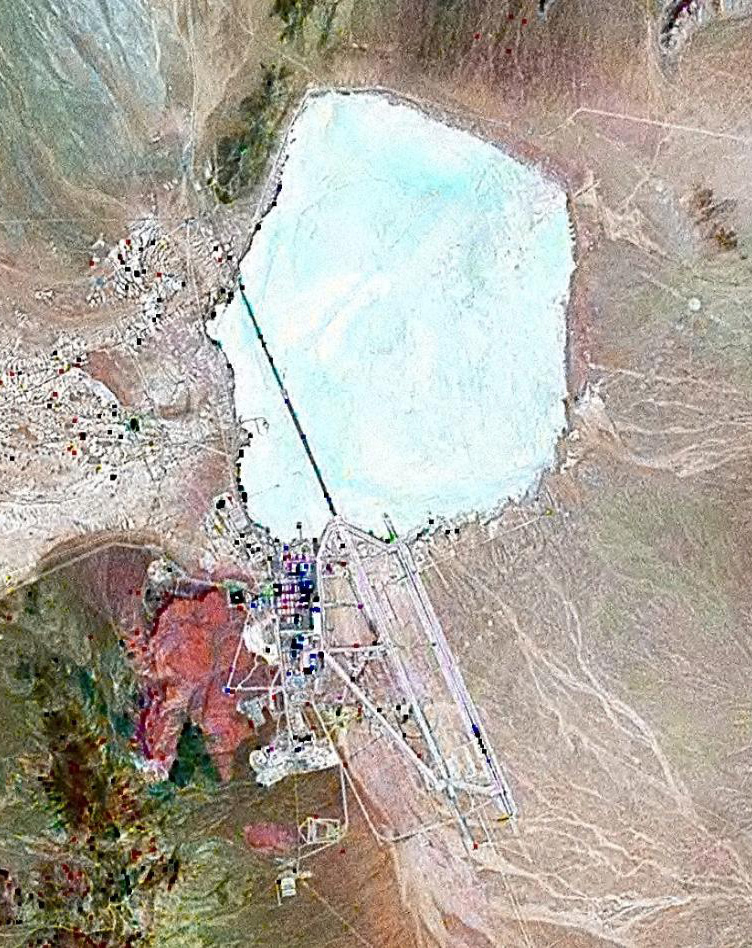
Much of the action takes place at Area 51, a military base frequently the subject of conspiracy theories.

Garry Shandling was initially sought out to play the part of Fletcher. However, he was unavailable because he was filming the movie Town and Country; he would later appear in the seventh season episode "Hollywood A.D.", playing a fictional version of himself. The production staff began looking for a replacement, going through, as the show's casting director Rick Millikan put it, "lists and lists" of potential actors. Vince Gilligan noted, however, that McKean was "at the top of our list from the beginning". McKean was very happy to play the part, although he did specifically ask the writers not to kill off his character.

Julia Vera was cast in the role of Lana Chee, the Hopi woman whose mind is switched with that of a young air force pilot. In order to age her, Vera wore special makeup and facial appliances; special contact lenses were also crafted, giving her eyes a clouded look. The scene in which she flicks a cigarette butt into Mulder's lap took five takes to get because the lenses obstructed her vision.

=== Filming ===
Production for "Dreamland" necessitated the series to temporarily relocate to "Club Ed", a movie ranch near Lancaster, California. Because Club Ed was almost 100 miles away from the Fox Studios, most of the show's crew had to camp out in motels located in the desert. Because this filming location was outside the Los Angeles studio zone, Fox was required to pay all actors and production staff members a per diem covering the cost of meals and motel reservations, leading to budget constraints. Half-way through the episode's production, Duchovny was reported as saying, "When is this show moving back to Los Angeles?" Within days, the crew had made T-shirts that humorously featured the question.

Many of the locations in the episode were created from scratch, either through conventional means or through computer technology. For instance, the gas station that explodes was erected by the props department outside Lancaster and fitted with gas pumps from a station that had recently closed. The store was then loaded with merchandise and then rigged for detonation. After the set was destroyed and filming ceased, the remnants were quickly cleared away. According to set decorator Duke Tomasick: "It was as if the whole thing never even existed". Area 51, the government airplanes, and the alien craft were all created with CGI technology by visual effects producer Bill Millar. Originally, the time warp effect resembled a "blue sheet", according to producer John Shiban, sans the blurring effect visible in the finished episode. Eventually, the production crew felt that this effect was not effective, and so the footage was blurred in order to create a more convincing "molecular transferal" effect.

Other locations were either real, or were filmed with the use of stand-ins. The gate for the Area 51 set, for instance, was filmed at a desolate stretch of fence near the Los Angeles/San Bernardino County division. The scene was later supplemented with a matte painting to complete the effect. While there really is a Little A'Le'Inn cafe in Rachel, Nevada, along Route 375, neither the outside or the inside of this location was featured in the episode.

=== Music ===
External audio
- via Glenn Jordan – Topic
- Staring at the Stars on YouTube

During the bar scene, a country song entitled "Staring at the Stars", written and recorded by Dan Marfisi and Glenn Jordan, can be heard playing in the background. The song became the subject of a years-long search by fans of the TV show as it was not mentioned in the end credits or in other sources such as the episode's IMDb page, and had not been commercially released. The name of the song and the identities of its composers were finally discovered after a thread on X asking about the song went viral in 2023.

Following the viral X thread, Marfisi uploaded a lyric video on his band's YouTube channel. Marfisi also revealed background information about the song: He and Jordan were musicians based in Los Angeles who had been asked to compose and record a country song by the show's producers. According to Marfisi, the song had to be "about an alien or a human being", while Jordan stated that it had to be "a love song from an alien abductee to the alien who disappeared". Marfisi also recalled that the song had to be done in four hours.

=== Choreography ===
The scene where Mulder-as-Fletcher encounters his reflection and proceeds to dance is an homage to the Marx Brothers comedy film Duck Soup (1933). Initially, the producers thought about creating the scene with expensive digital effects. Duchovny and McKean, however, volunteered to do it the "old fashioned way" by choreographing their moves so that they would be in-sync. Duchovny and McKean each watched Duck Soup and then practiced their routine for a week and a half. During filming, a metronome was used so that the two actors could keep time with each other; this ticking was then removed during post-production. The effect was furthered by a unique set that was actually two bedrooms, both mirror images of each other. The only part of this dance that required any CGI was when Mulder fogs up the mirror with his breath.

== Reception ==
=== Ratings ===
"Dreamland" first aired in the United States on November 29, and "Dreamland II" aired on December 6, 1998. The first part of the episode earned a Nielsen rating of 10.1, with a 15 share, meaning that roughly 10.1 percent of all television-equipped households, and 15 percent of households watching television, were tuned in to the episode. It was viewed by 17.48 million people. The second part received a 10 rating, with a 15 share. It was subsequently viewed by 17.01 million people. The first part aired in the United Kingdom and Ireland on Sky1 on March 28, 1999, and the second part aired on April 4; part one received 0.73 million viewers and was the fourth most watched episode that week, and part two later received 0.88 million viewers and was the second most watched episode that week, after an episode of Friends.

=== Reviews ===
The episode received mostly mixed reviews from critics, with many commenting on the episode's reliance on humor. In a review of part one, a critic from Knight Ridder wrote, "As disorienting as this body transfer had to be for Mulder, the experience provided amusing television. And that seems to be a problem for some X-Files fans. Knowing that the human population's survival is imperiled by the colonization plans of a fierce extraterrestrial race, a large number of X-Philes want the show to focus on our heroes' efforts to come to the rescue". The newspaper's review of Part 2 was much more negative, with the article saying "by the end of the latest X-Files episode, we were wishing we could push a reset button on Dreamland II, just to forget some of the silly stuff that transpired in this show". Robert Shearman, in his book Wanting to Believe: A Critical Guide to The X-Files, Millennium & The Lone Gunmen, rated the episode two stars out of five and noted that the episode lacked "structure and point". Paula Vitaris from Cinefantastique gave both episodes mixed reviews, awarding the first part two-and-a-half stars out of four, and the second part two stars. Vitaris was unhappy with the amount of comedy used in the episode, noting that once Mulder visited Fletcher's house, "the comedy turns sour": she argued that the members of Fletcher's family were examples of caricatures. Despite this, she praised the scene featuring the murder of the gas station attendant, claiming that "for a moment, this episode really clicks". Vitaris, in her review for part two, called the episode "purely illogical", although she noted it did feature "minor fun", pointing out the scene wherein Scully catches Fletcher by handcuffing him.

Not all reviews were completely negative. Zack Handlen from The A.V. Club wrote positively of the first part of the episode's humor and awarded it a B+. Handlen noted that "the context of seeing actors in the wrong places" is "what's funny about the episode". However, he did slightly criticize the episode's padding—specifically Nora Dunn's role as Fletcher's wife and the Duck Soup mirror gag—but argued that "for every bit that doesn't play in the episode, there are three that do." Emily St. James, also from The A.V. Club, gave the second half of the episode a B− and wrote, "I have basically nothing to add to what Zack said about the first 'Dreamland' last week. 'Dreamland II' is a fairly unnecessary hour of television, and there's no reason this logy two-parter couldn't have become a much tighter one-hour episode." Tom Kessenich, in his book Examination: An Unauthorized Look at Seasons 6–9 of the X-Files wrote that "my final judgement on 'Dreamland' [part one] is that I enjoyed the entertainment value it presented. It was fun and I'm not one to begrudge a little romp now and then." Kessenich, however, did note that the second part "felt strung out". Den of Geek writer Juliette Harrisson, however, saw the episode in a more positive light and said, "Season six included some more excellent episodes only peripherally related to the main story arc, [such as] Dreamland parts one and two". Kerry Fall from DVD Journal wrote positively of the episodes and described them, together as "one of the best episodes in years". Gareth Wigmore of TV Zone gave the first part of the episode an 8 out of 10 rating and highlighted the "strong story-telling, clever dialogue, and good acting". Earl Cressey from DVD Talk concluded that both "Dreamland" parts one and two were among the "highlights of season six". Topless Robot named "Dreamland" the fourth funniest episode of the series.

== Bibliography ==
- Kessenich, Tom (2002). Examination: An Unauthorized Look at Seasons 6–9 of the X-Files. Trafford Publishing. ISBN 1-55369-812-6.
- Meisler, Andy (2000). The End and the Beginning: The Official Guide to the X-Files Volume 5. Harper Prism. ISBN 0-06-107595-7.
- Shapiro, Marc (2000). All Things: The Official Guide to the X-Files Volume 6. Harper Prism. ISBN 0-06-107611-2.
- Shearman, Robert (2009). Wanting to Believe: A Critical Guide to The X-Files, Millennium & The Lone Gunmen. Mad Norwegian Press. ISBN 978-0-9759446-9-1.

This article incorporates material derived from the "Dreamland" article on the X-Files wiki at Fandom (formerly Wikia) and is licensed under the Creative Commons Attribution-Share Alike 3.0 License (December 26, 2011).
