= Rebecca Toolan =

American television actress

- Born: September 1943 (age 83)
- Occupations: Actress, professor
- Years active: 1960s-present

Rebecca Toolan (born September 1943) is an American television actress best known for playing Teena Mulder, Fox Mulder's mother, on The X-Files.

== Early life and career ==
Although she has lived and worked in Canada for years, Toolan was actually born in the United States and grew up in the U.S. state of Iowa. After teaching in Brazil, she got her master's degree at the University of Iowa and then taught theater at the Universities of Winnipeg and Manitoba. She married Paul Toolan in 1968 before marrying Max Sucharov.

Her feature film credits include Little Women, Knight Moves, and The Accused.

== Filmography ==
Year	Title	Role	Notes
1988	The Accused	911 Operator	
1989	Immediate Family	Real Estate Woman	
1992	Knight Moves	Mayor	
1992	Stay Tuned	Crying Widow	
1994	Little Women	Mrs. Gardiner	
1994	Exquisite Tenderness	Mittlesbay's Secretary	
1995	Hideaway	Female Doctor	
1995	Urban Safari	Louise Winkler	
1996	Maternal Instincts	Hospital Administrator	
2000	Once Upon a Christmas	Clara Claus	
2007	Shooter	Mrs. Rate	
2018	Bad Times at the El Royale	Helen Gandy	
