= Fox Mulder =

X-Files protagonist

- The X-Files character
- First appearance: "Pilot" (September 10, 1993)
- Last appearance: "My Struggle IV" (March 21, 2018)
- Portrayed by: David Duchovny
- City: Washington, D.C.
- Born: Fox William Mulder

In-universe information
- Full name: Fox William Mulder
- Species: Human, Male
- Occupation: FBI Special Agent
- Family: Teena Mulder (mother); Bill Mulder (legal father); Cigarette Smoking Man (biological father); Jeffrey Spender (paternal half-brother); Samantha Mulder (maternal half-sister); William Scully (biological son)
- Origin: X-Files
- Spouse: Dana Scully
- Affiliations: John Doggett; Monica Reyes; Walter Skinner; The Lone Gunmen
- Duration: 1993–2002, 2008, 2016–2018
- Seasons: 1 • 2 • 3 • 4 • 5 • 6 • 7 • 8 • 9 • 10 • 11
- Films: The X-Files, The X-Files: I Want to Believe

Fox William Mulder (/ˈmʌldər/) is one of the two protagonists of the Fox science fiction-supernatural television series The X-Files. The character, played by David Duchovny, works with Dana Scully as Special Agents in the FBI's X-Files office, concerned with unsolved criminal cases that are often revealed to be supernatural or extraterrestrial in nature.

Mulder made his first appearance in the first season pilot episode, broadcast in 1993. He was a main character for the first seven seasons, but was then limited to a recurring character for the following two seasons. Mulder returned as a main character for the tenth and eleventh seasons.

Mulder's main focus of his life is finding proof of extraterrestrial or paranormal activity, and uncovering a government conspiracy to hide or deny the truth of their existence. Most of his peers dismiss him as a conspiracy theorist and supernaturalist. However, his partner Scully, skeptical but supportive, often finds his theories to be unexpectedly correct.

== Fictional character biography ==
Mulder was born on October 13, 1961, on the island of Martha's Vineyard, Massachusetts. The mysterious disappearance of Mulder's sister and his ensuing search for her became the consuming drive of his life. In 1983, Mulder graduated with first-class honors from the University of Oxford with a Bachelor of Arts degree in psychology. He then graduated with honors from the Quantico FBI Training Academy in 1986. Mulder joined the FBI on October 24, 1984. Upon graduating from the academy, Mulder began his work in the Behavioral Science Unit (psychological profiling) under Special Agent Bill Patterson, with whom he had a testy relationship.

In 1988, the FBI assigned Mulder to the Violent Crimes Unit. Around this time, Mulder first came across the X-Files, an obscure FBI section dealing with cases relating to the paranormal; he pored over these cases in his spare time, becoming obsessed with them. In 1991, Mulder re-opened the X-Files with Special Agent Diana Fowley, but Fowley left shortly thereafter. Mulder investigated the X-Files by himself until March 1992, when Special Agent Dana Scully, an instructor at the FBI Academy's Forensic Science Research and Training Center, was partnered with him for the purpose of applying scientific reasoning to Mulder's work and theories.

Mulder's ultimate goal was to uncover what he believed to be a government conspiracy to hide the truth about alien life, and to find out what had happened to his sister. His quest and belief in the existence of aliens were, for most of the series, the driving force of the plot, or mytharc. However, during a period of time after Scully's cancer went into remission (season 5), Mulder was convinced by Michael Kritschgau that aliens did not in fact exist and that the government conspirators had merely concocted that threat as a smokescreen, to justify military activities and toy with him.

During the seventh season, Mulder eventually discovers the truth about his sister. Samantha was abducted (either by the alien colonists or the government conspirators), and various tests were performed on her. She was then returned to The Smoking Man to live out her life under his supervision, all the while undergoing additional tests. She was unable to bear the testing any longer so she ran away from her home and was eventually admitted to a nearby hospital, where she disappeared from her locked room. It is revealed that Samantha was taken by "spiritual intervention", with the help of beings called "Walk-ins". Mulder is briefly reunited with Samantha's spirit.

Mulder was also abducted by the aliens himself in 2000, and returned to Earth, almost dead, a few months later. He had been infected by an alien virus (for the second time), but Scully found a way to rescue him. After Mulder returned home to his apartment, an application was submitted to the FBI for his reinstatement to the X-Files but this was declined by Deputy Director Alvin Kersh, who had been promoted in charge of the X-Files shortly after Mulder had been abducted. He returned to work for a brief period of time, but was eventually fired for failure to follow orders not to investigate any X-Files. After Scully gave birth to William, Mulder went into hiding in New Mexico after Kersh said his life was in danger.

After about a year in hiding, Mulder obtains crucial information from a secret facility about the date of the planned alien colonization effort, but is caught and put on trial for the murder of Knowle Rohrer. Despite a defense organized by Walter Skinner with numerous witnesses, the judges sentence Mulder to death. With help from several people, including a reformed Kersh and the ghost of Alex Krycek, Mulder breaks out of prison and escapes with Scully. As of the series finale, Mulder and Scully were on the run. Six years after the events of the ninth season, Fox Mulder's fugitive status is clear. Scully mentions that he is wanted by the FBI and the dialogue also shows that the FBI does not really want to find him and is simply happy to have him "out of their hair". He is called to assist with the investigation of a missing FBI agent. In exchange for his help, all charges against him are dropped.

Seven years later, Mulder returns to the FBI when the X-Files is re-opened, in order to look into a government conspiracy, when it transpires they have been using alien technology. Along with Scully, they investigate several cases together like they had done originally. Six weeks after their return to the X-Files, Mulder confronts an alive Smoking Man to try to prevent him from carrying out a plan to depopulate the United States using a virus applied to smallpox vaccines. In a vision of Scully's, Mulder falls sick to the disease, but refuses the Smoking Man's help and his proposal to join his elite. Mulder is saved by Agent Miller and they regroup with Scully; however, she says Mulder needs a blood transfusion and only their son can give it to them. At that moment, an unidentified flying object hovers over the trio, which is where season ten ends. The beginning of season eleven reveals this vision came from Scully's son, William. Over the course of season eleven, Scully and Mulder search for William. Skinner learns from the Smoking Man that the Smoking Man, who is Mulder's father, also artificially impregnated Scully, and thus is William's father as well. In the third episode of the eleventh season, "Plus One", Scully and Mulder are intimate again. In the season 11 finale, "My Struggle IV", she reveals to Mulder that she is pregnant with his child.

=== Characterization ===
If there was a profiler like himself profiling him he would have to work from the fact that he has some oral fixation because he is constantly popping sunflower seeds. He doesn't have a bedroom, you've never seen him in his bed, you've seen him sleeping only on the couch.
– David Duchovny talking about his character.

Despite his aloofness and cynical sense of humor, Mulder displays unbridled enthusiasm and interest when it comes to the paranormal, especially because of his personal involvement after his sister's abduction. Walter Skinner and other FBI officials have become concerned by his unprofessional behavior. This only proves true as Mulder makes a habit of letting his personal feelings cloud his judgment; his emotional attachment to UFO cases becomes more severe throughout the series, because of Dana Scully's eventual abduction and resultant cancer as well as his sister's abduction. Mulder can lose his temper when Scully is involved; on multiple occasions, he has become violent in his grief and unreserved in threatening physical force. Mulder's overprotectiveness of Scully stems not only from his obvious devotion and love for her, but also a long-harbored guilt; Mulder has admitted feeling indirectly responsible for the ordeals and tragedies Scully had gone through because of their investigations.

In the episode "Drive", Mulder facetiously apologizes on behalf of the "international Jewish conspiracy" in response to the abusive and anti-Semitic tirades of a suspect, to which Mulder appears to take offense; the suspect also guesses Mulder's ethnicity is Jewish based on his last name. Despite this, in the episode "Kaddish", Mulder is unable to identify a Talmudic book, states that he does not know Hebrew, and quips that Jesus returned from the dead. Also, Mulder, as his father before him, had a Christian burial presided over by a Protestant minister following his apparent "death" in the episode "Deadalive". This suggests he hails from a Protestant background, as Scully hails from a Catholic background. Mulder also seeks comfort in a Christian church following the events of the episode "Conduit". Of course Mulder could conceivably be of a Jewish ethnic descent but a Christian background, perhaps through ancestral marriage or conversion. David Duchovny suggested Mulder is Jewish when interviewed during production of the second season. In the episode "The Field Where I Died", Mulder went into a hypnotic trance and recalls a past life, where he is in a concentration camp during the Holocaust, and another where he was a Confederate soldier killed in the Battle of Chattanooga.

Mulder is almost never seen sleeping in a bed. The bedroom in his apartment (which appeared as late as the sixth season of the show's run) is apparently used for storage and is filled floor to ceiling with junk, including a couple of boxes of pornographic magazines. Instead, Mulder sleeps on his couch, often falling asleep to a blaring television. Mulder can seem to go through manic periods when worried or working on a case, contributing to or exacerbating his insomniac tendencies. Since "Dreamland II" where a "man in black" body-swaps with Mulder and takes over his life, Mulder gets his bedroom renovated and equipped with a waterbed. In "Monday" he finds himself soaked through when his waterbed (which he can't remember getting because Morris Fletcher got it in Dreamland) is leaking.

=== Relationships ===
He's a guy who should be working, and he's not working because he's tried to make this relationship with Scully work.
– David Duchovny in an interview talking about The X-Files: I Want to Believe.

Mulder had a rather strained relationship with his parents Bill and Teena Mulder, not least thanks to the X-Files. Initially, he had no idea his father was involved in the conspiracy and Samantha's disappearance. Bill, who became disenchanted with the shadow government and his own role in the conspiracy, eventually approached Fox about his past deeds but was shot and killed by Alex Krycek – working as an assassin for the Syndicate – before he could reveal any great amount of information. Over the next few years, Mulder got into several conflicts with his mother while trying to discover the extent of her own knowledge of his father's precise involvement. Teena dies of an apparent suicide when the stress of Samantha's abduction finally becomes too painful.

During the last years of his work on the X-Files, Mulder was even forced to doubt that Bill was his true father. He is led to consider the possibility that his mother had had an affair with the Smoking Man, a connection which may have resulted in the birth of either Samantha or Mulder himself. The possibility was hinted at later in the series, and Jeffrey Spender, who certainly was the Smoking Man's son, said that Mulder was his half-brother. In the ninth season, "William" explains that Spender and Mulder have very similar DNA, providing strong evidence that they do have the same father.

During his studies at Oxford, around the year of 1983, he was dating Phoebe Green; future investigator of Metropolitan Police Service (season 1, episode 12, Fire). When he started his work on The X-Files, around 1991, he was close with his current partner; Diana Fowley (season 5, episode 20, The End). None of those remained longterm and stable.

Mulder's closest friend was FBI partner Dana Scully, who was assigned to "debunk [his] work" by the conspirators and the FBI brass. But against their intentions, her loyalties quickly became affixed to Mulder's quest and Mulder himself, a connection which seemed to pull Mulder's work out of obscurity, as Scully's scientific bent afforded them a certain amount of credibility. Their intense professional and personal relationship continued to strengthen through the years. While the relationship was platonic for the greater part of the series, there are clues that it developed into a romantic one by the last few seasons. Mulder and Scully almost always called each other by their surnames – Mulder purportedly hated his first name, but Scully had no such aversion. At the fourth episode of season seven the romantic undertones were confirmed when the two shared a kiss. In the series finale, the final scene depicted Mulder and Scully after running away together, in bed together, contemplating what the future held. In the season 11 finale Scully revealed to be pregnant with his unborn child.

Mulder's greatest nemesis was The Smoking Man, who, despite his obvious ill-intent, seemed to hold Mulder in special regard. Though he mocked Mulder to his face for his foolishness and the futility of his quest, in "Two Fathers", he told his son Jeffrey Spender, "You pale [sic] to Fox Mulder." Mulder also developed an intense enmity for Alex Krycek, a double agent who briefly worked with Mulder in the FBI as an infiltrator, and who continued to serve as a recurring adversary, acting as an assassin for the Syndicate in the murders of Bill Mulder and Melissa Scully.

=== Appearances ===
Duchovny portrays Mulder as a series regular for the first seven seasons of the show. Duchovny left the show following the seventh-season finale "Requiem", wherein he was abducted by aliens. Although he makes a handful of cameos in the first part of season eight—most notably in the episodes "Within", "Without", "The Gift", and "Per Manum"—Mulder is returned by the aliens and the latter part of the season deals with his death, subsequent resurrection, and his departure from the FBI. After the conclusion of the eighth season, Duchovny left the show and only appeared in four ninth-season episodes: "Trust No 1", "Jump the Shark", "William", and "The Truth". Duchovny's appearances in "Trust No 1" and "Jump the Shark" were via archival footage, and he only made a small cameo in the third. However, his appearance in "The Truth", the program's series finale, was substantial, and Duchovny was once again listed in the credits as starring.

== Conceptual history ==
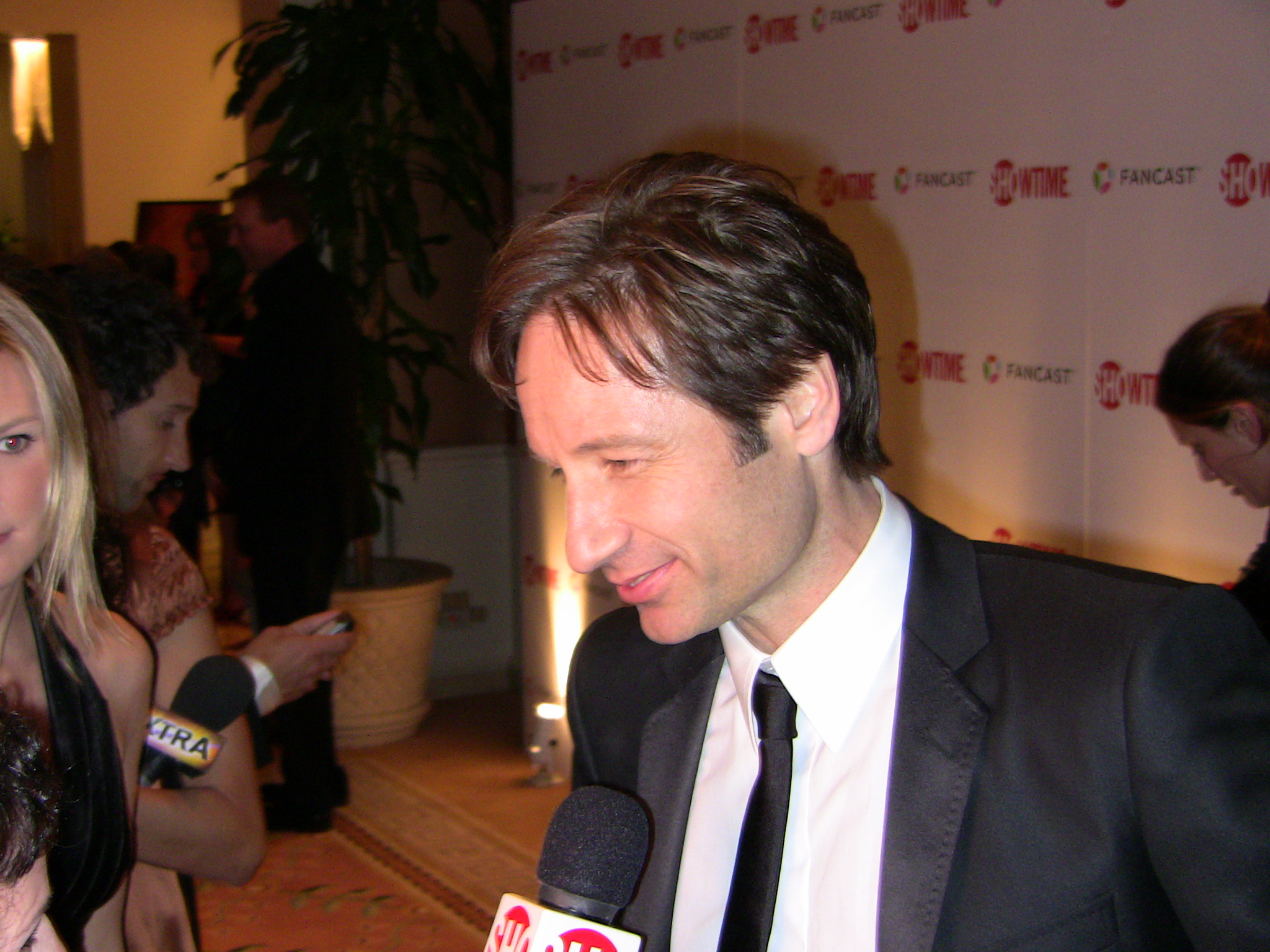
Duchovny portrayed Mulder, the main character in the first seven seasons and the tenth season, as well as a recurring character in the eighth and ninth seasons.

David Duchovny had worked in Los Angeles three years prior to The X-Files. At first, he wanted to base his acting career around films, but in 1993 his manager Melanie Green gave him a script of the pilot episode of The X-Files. Green and Duchovny were both convinced it was a good script, so Duchovny auditioned for the lead. When Duchovny was auditioning for the part of Fox Mulder, he made a terrific audition but talked rather slowly. Chris Carter thought that he was a good judge of character, and thought that Duchovny wasn't too bright. So he talked to Duchovny and asked him if he could please imagine himself as an FBI agent for the future weeks. The casting director of the show was very positive about him, while according to Carter, Duchovny turned out to be one of the best-read people he knew. After getting the role, Duchovny thought the show wouldn't last for long or that it wouldn't make as much impact as it did.

Carter has said that he named Mulder after his mother's maiden name. His first name, Fox, was actually not a tribute to the Fox network which aired The X-Files, as often assumed – Carter said he had a childhood friend named Fox. Mulder was inspired by the fictional character Carl Kolchak, a newspaper reporter Carter described as a "believer" just like Mulder. Kolchak was in turn inspired by the fictional character Harry Picard, a policeman in Les Whitten's vampire novel The Progeny of the Adder. Duchovny got the script with many of Mulder's characteristics fully formed. Executive producer Frank Spotnitz called portraying actor Duchovny amazingly smart. He further stated that Duchovny was behind some of the main characteristic ideas behind Mulder.

At the end of the seventh season Duchovny was in negotiations with the Fox network, saying he wanted more money (while not saying how much) and an improved work schedule, among other issues. After settling his contract dispute, Duchovny quit full-time participation in the show after the seventh season. This contributed to uncertainties over the likelihood of an eighth season. Carter and most fans felt the show was at its natural endpoint with Duchovny's departure, but it was decided Mulder would be abducted at the end of the seventh season, leaving things open for the actor's return in 12 episodes the following year. Duchovny's character Mulder was replaced by John Jay Doggett (portrayed by Robert Patrick). In season nine, Duchovny wasn't available for shooting, so he only appeared in three episodes with small cameos, the first being an archive footage only in "Trust No 1", a brief cameo in "William", which he also directed and appeared full-time in the series finale, "The Truth".

After the show ended, Carter and Frank Spotnitz started to talk about a movie sequel. Duchovny stated in an interview that very same year that it always had been a desire to come back to the franchise, saying it was a natural stage of development for the franchise to go to the cinema. When talking about Mulder in The X-Files: I Want to Believe, Duchovny said that he wanted to play him a "little different". He continued saying that Mulder had "lost every battle" and was "beaten down by life ... . He's the same guy, but he is older Mulder".

Mulder had a brief cameo on The Lone Gunmen, an X-Files spin-off featuring the characters of the same name. He appeared on the episode "All About Yves". In the Millennium episode "Lamentation", the main character, Frank Black, visits the FBI Academy in Quantico, Virginia, and Mulder and Dana Scully are briefly seen descending a stairway. In fact, they are Duchovny and Anderson's stand-ins.

== Reception ==
Duchovny was nominated for two Emmy Awards in 1997 and 1998 in the category "Outstanding Lead Actor in a Drama Series", but lost. He was nominated for a Golden Globe Award in 1995 in the category "Best Actor – Drama Series". Two years later he was again nominated for a Golden Globe in the same category and won, in 1997 and 1998 he was nominated in the same category but didn't win. Duchovny has been nominated five times in the category "Outstanding Actor – Drama Series" by the Screen Actors Guild awards but didn't win once. Duchovny won a Satellite Award in the category "Best Actor – Drama Series" in 1997, and was nominated once again 1998.

Animated versions of Mulder appeared on The Simpsons and Eek! the Cat (both series which have been featured in episodes of The X-Files), in the episodes "The Springfield Files" and "Eek Space-9", respectively. Both featured the voice acting of Duchovny. Duchovny appeared as Mulder on the sketch show Saturday Night Live with Molly Shannon as Scully, when he hosted an episode. Joining him was co-star Nicholas Lea, who would appear as Alex Krycek in a sketch that spoofed The X-Files.

The New York Times writer Joyce Millman said that Twin Peaks character Special Agent Dale Cooper could have been Mulder's "quirky ... spiritual twin" if David Duchovny hadn't appeared in the show earlier. When reviewing The X-Files: I Want to Believe, reviewer Moira Macdonald said it was a "kick" watching Duchovny and Gillian Anderson (who portrayed Dana Scully). Jesse Hassenger from PopMatters when reviewing season eight, was throughout negative to the new season, claiming that Patrick was miscast and calling David Duchovny's appearances as Mulder shallow. Critics and fans alike have praised Duchovny and Anderson's "on-screen chemistry" for years. Richard Corliss from Time magazine praised Duchovny for settling in his role so "quickly" and calling the character "an obsessive plodder". Robert Patrick, the actor who replaced Duchovny as the male lead after the seventh season, commented that the chemistry Duchovny and Gillian Anderson had, could only happen "once in a lifetime".

TV Guide ranked Fox Mulder #7 in its "50 Greatest Sci-Fi Legends" list.
