= Vienen =

Episode of The X-Files (S8 E18)

- The X-Files episode
- A black oil infected host infects another person. "Vienen" marked the last time the substance was featured in the series.
- Episode no.: Season 8 Episode 18
- Directed by: Rod Hardy
- Written by: Steven Maeda
- Production code: 8ABX16
- Original air date: April 29, 2001
- Running time: 44 minutes

Guest appearances
- Mitch Pileggi as Walter Skinner; James Pickens, Jr. as Alvin Kersh; Casey Biggs as Mr. Saksa; Gregory Norman Cruz as Diego Garza; M. C. Gainey as Bo Taylor; Kevin C. Loomis as Chef; Rich Marotta as Hockey Announcer; Lee Reherman as Yuri Volkov; Miguel Sandoval as Martin Ortega; Luis Villalta as Simon de la Cruz; Steve Wilcox as Ed Dell

Episode chronology
← Previous "Empedocles"	Next → "Alone"
- The X-Files season 8

"Vienen" is the eighteenth episode of the eighth season of the American science fiction television series The X-Files, and is the 179th episode overall. The episode first aired in the United States and Canada on April 29, 2001, on the Fox Network, and in the United Kingdom on June 7. It was written by staff member Steven Maeda, was directed by Rod Hardy, and forms part of the series' overarching mythology. The episode received a Nielsen household rating of 7.4 and was viewed by 11.8 million viewers. "Vienen" received mixed to positive reviews from critics, many of whom appreciated its connection to the show's older mythology.

The season centers on FBI special agents Dana Scully (Gillian Anderson), her new partner John Doggett (Robert Patrick), and Scully's former partner Fox Mulder (David Duchovny), who work on X-Files—cases linked to the paranormal. In this episode, Mulder disobeys orders to stay away from the X-Files and finds himself stranded on a quarantined oil platform with Doggett. They soon discover that the crew has been infected with the "black oil" (an alien virus that Mulder and Scully have encountered many times before). Despite their dislike for each other, Mulder and Doggett team up and escape before the infected crew members are able to capture and kill them.

The episode features the last major appearance of the alien "black oil", which had played a significant role in the series ever since its introduction in the third-season episode "Piper Maru". The oil effects were created using chocolate syrup and molasses. Principal filming for "Vienen" was carried out at three locations: an oil platform, an oil refinery, and on a specially-created set. The episode's title is a Spanish word meaning "they come" or "they are coming", and has been interpreted as foreshadowing the show's Super Soldier narrative arc. Elements of the plot have been compared to the ancient Greek religious and mythological figure Orpheus.

== Plot ==
Simon de la Cruz, a worker on an oil platform in the Gulf of Mexico, fatally stabs radio operator Ed Dell, who has been infected with the black oil. De la Cruz then destroys the platform's radio equipment but is killed by Bo Taylor, whose body begins to glow.

At FBI headquarters, Special Agent Fox Mulder (David Duchovny) tells John Doggett (Robert Patrick) that ninety percent of de la Cruz's body was covered with apparent radiation burns. Although the company that owns the oil platform attributes the burns to an explosion, Mulder suspects extraterrestrial "black oil". Deputy Director Alvin Kersh (James Pickens, Jr.) sends Doggett to investigate the platform, but he is surprised to find that Mulder is already there, prepared to investigate the incident unofficially.

Elsewhere, the platform's new communications officer, Yuri, repairs the damaged radio but is infected with the black oil by Taylor. Mulder and Doggett soon find evidence of the oil and quarantine the platform. Mulder and Doggett then search for de la Cruz's missing friend Diego Garza. After someone sets fire to the communications room, Garza attacks Doggett and cuts his own arm to prove that he is not infected, warning him that "vienen" (Spanish for "they're coming"). Meanwhile, during an autopsy, Dana Scully (Gillian Anderson) finds dead, irradiated black oil in de la Cruz's skull.

Scully realizes that de la Cruz and Garza are immune to the black oil because of their indigenous Mexican heritage; instead of becoming infected, de la Cruz suffered radiation burns from exposure to the substance. Meanwhile, Taylor attacks Doggett, but Mulder intervenes, and the agents barricade themselves in the communications room as the infected crew surrounds them. After Mulder destroys the radio to prevent the infected crew from communicating with the aliens, the crew sabotage the platform instead. Mulder and Doggett jump into the sea moments before the platform explodes. While the two are rescued by helicopters, Mulder is subsequently dismissed from the FBI for investigating the platform against orders.

== Production ==
=== Writing and filming ===
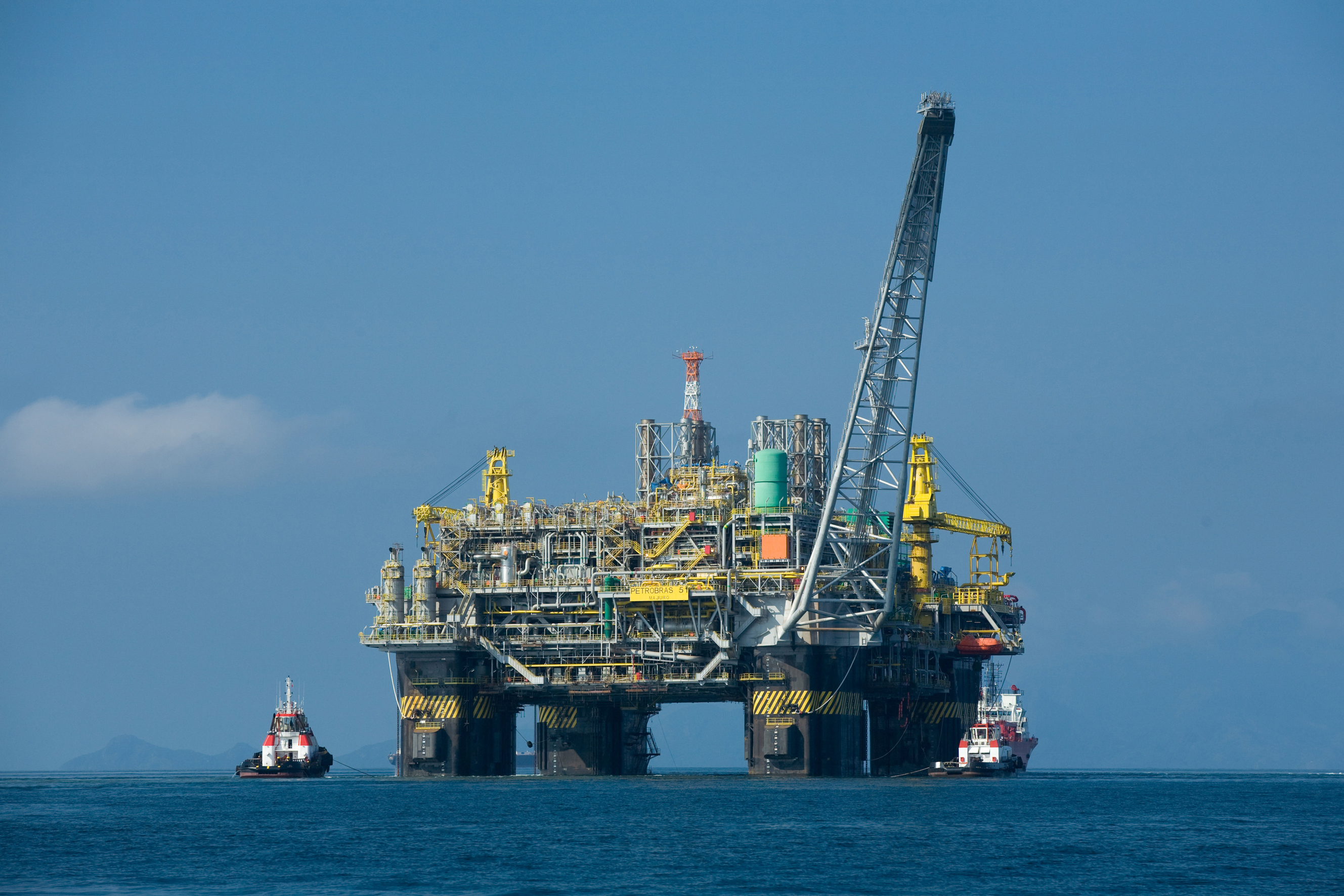
Several scenes were filmed on an oil platform in the Santa Barbara coast.

"Vienen" was written by Steven Maeda as a vehicle for Mulder to pass on the X-Files legacy to Doggett. Patrick compared Mulder to a Greek chorus and said that the episode was a "way to have Mulder give Doggett his blessing and pass him The X-Files baton." Maeda complimented the show's producers for deciding to pass the X-Files division over to Doggett, noting that they were "aware of what's going on in the audience's head". The title, "Vienen," is Spanish; it is the third-person plural present indicative form of venir, which means "they come" or "they are coming".

The episode was directed by Rod Hardy, who directed the earlier season eight episodes "Roadrunners" and "Salvage". Hardy was offered the role after an unknown individual working on The X-Files saw his TBS remake of the film High Noon. Of the three season eight episodes that he helmed, Hardy enjoyed directing this episode most due to its adherence to the series' mythology; he later described the episode as "classic X-Files." The eighth season was filmed out of order; "Vienen" was the sixteenth episode produced but the eighteenth aired, largely due to Duchovny's availability. Each episode of The X-Files usually took about eighteen days to film, including seven days for pre-production, nine for main-unit shooting, and two for second-unit filming. "Vienen" was produced in eleven days by working the crew in thirteen- to fourteen-hour shifts.

"Vienen" was shot in three locations: a studio in Los Angeles, a closed-down CENCO oil refinery in Santa Fe Springs, and an offshore oil platform in the Pacific Ocean off the coast of Santa Barbara. During the show's previous seasons, location manager Ilt Jones had been required to scout for locations after scripts were submitted. Starting with the eighth season, however, he was allowed to go on several "scouting roadshow[s]" in order to find new and interesting locations that could be written into scripts. Jones, who discovered the oil platform and the refinery during his first scouting trip, later said the oil platform was "his favorite example" of places he was able to find. Because the platform and refinery were scouted in advance, Jones was given six weeks to prepare the shoot—a "far cry" from the usual two. This added time also saved the series a considerable amount of money. Filming on the oil platform occurred between sunrise and sunset in one day. The film crew used Steadicams for filming on the oil platform because the decks were slick with oil and, according to Hardy, the cameras "sort of fit and blend[ed] in quite well" on the platform.

The series' leading actors were required to film in three separate locations. Anderson's scenes were filmed solely on the show's sets in Los Angeles. Since her character did not accompany Mulder and Doggett, Anderson had no scenes with Patrick and Duchovny, except for the opening sequence that takes place in Kersh's office. Most of Patrick and Duchovny's scenes were filmed on the oil platform and at the refinery, although several key scenes, including the destruction of the oil platform, were filmed on the show's set in Los Angeles. Patrick and Duchovny were flown between the three locations. Others scenes were filmed in the studio. Production designer Corey Kaplan was tasked with recreating the oil platform's control room, mess hall, and some operational sections, which required "a brilliant piece of synergy between all [of the series'] departments" in order to come together. The scene in which the oil platform bursts into flame was created in the studio on the mock-rig set. The set was made of wood, posing a unique challenge for the art department, as they had to make it look as if the fire was melting steel.

=== Special effects ===
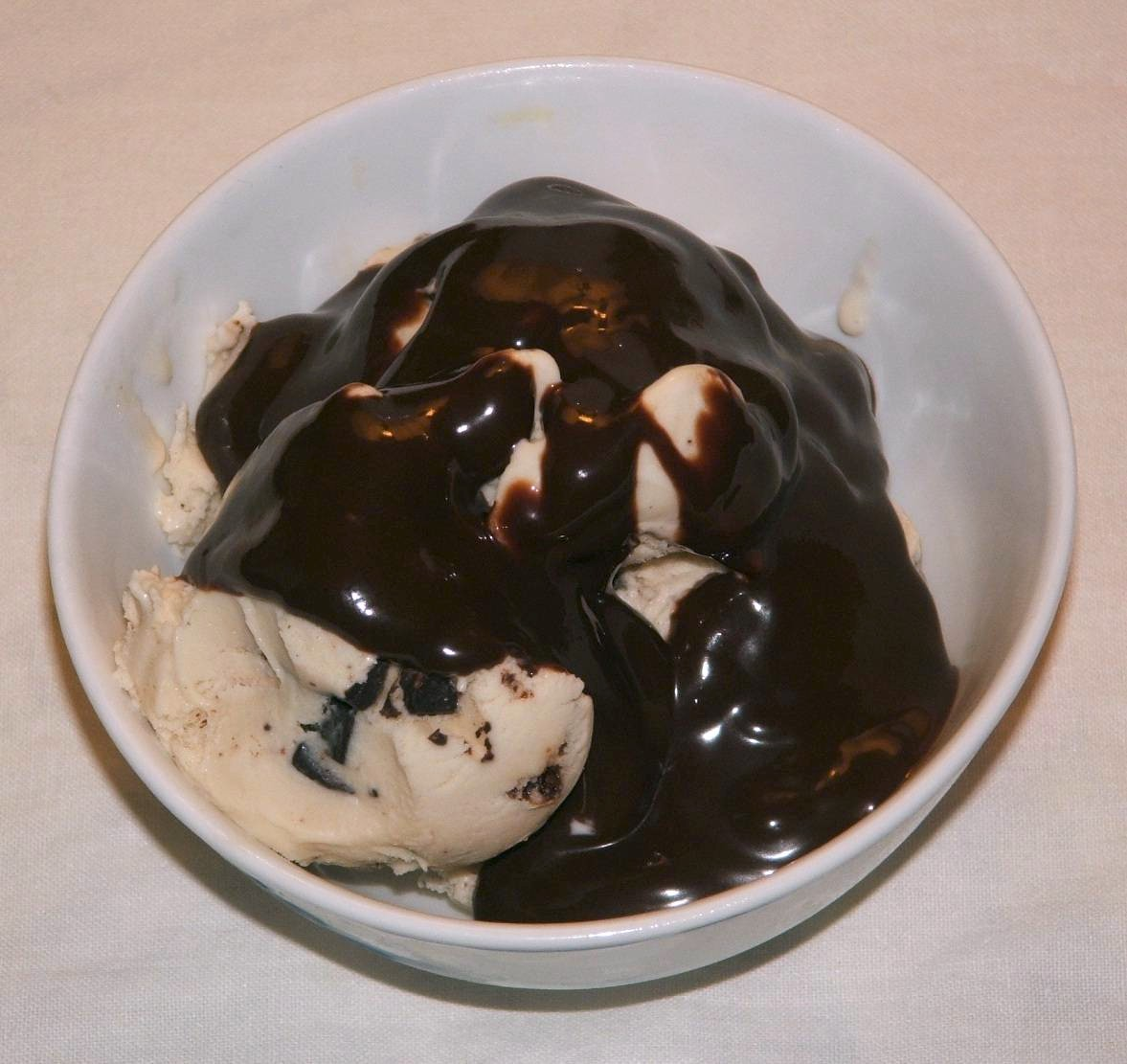
Chocolate syrup and molasses were used for the black oil visual effect.

The scene in which Mulder and Doggett agree to jump from the oil platform—which was shot in a way that evokes a similar scene in the 1969 film Butch Cassidy and the Sundance Kid—was filmed by having Patrick and Duchovny jump in front of a green screen. Separate footage of the rig exploding, created by combining actual shots of the rig with CGI, was then filmed, and the two shots were composited on top of one another.

The episode featured the penultimate appearance of the alien black oil; it would appear for a final time via flashback in the series finale. Visual effects for the black oil were created by combining molasses and chocolate syrup with computer-generated imagery (CGI). Nine takes were needed for the scene in which the black oil pours out of a worker's eyes, ears, and mouth, as the syrupy mixture would not spill correctly.

== Themes ==
Michelle Bush, in her book Myth-X, noted that the oil platform is named "Galpex-Orpheux", a reference to the ancient Greek religious and mythological figure Orpheus, who was a legendary musician, poet, and prophet. According to the myth, Orpheus's wife Eurydice stepped on a viper, was bitten, and died instantly. Hades, the god of the underworld—after hearing Orpheus' moving music—allowed Orpheus to retrieve his wife's soul with one condition: he must not look at her until the two of them have climbed safely out of the underworld. Orpheus fails, and his wife's soul is returned to the underworld. Bush compared Orpheus's otherworldly singing to the "broadband signal which is the catalyst for the events on the rig". In the episode, Mulder, Doggett, and the two Huecha Indians "wreak havoc" because of their fear, and the "black oil slips back to the underworld".

In regards to the episode's title, Bush argued that while the Spanish word vienen means "they are coming", the episode does not explain who "they" are. She wrote that the verb could refer to either "the aliens" who are planning on colonizing the Earth or to "the humans that are disturbing the black oil". Douglas Kellner, in his book Media Spectacle, writes that, because the episode alludes to the series' "Super Soldiers" story arc (a plot thread that had previously been referenced in the eighth-season episode "This Is Not Happening" and which would be explored heavily near the end of the show's eighth season and throughout its ninth), it is likely that the title refers to the inevitable onslaught of these alien warriors.

== Reception ==
=== Ratings and release ===
"Vienen" premiered on American television on April 29, 2001. It received a Nielsen household rating of 7.4 (meaning that it was seen by an estimated 7.4% of US households), and it was viewed by 11.8 million viewers overall. The episode debuted in Ireland and the United Kingdom on June 7 on Sky 1, and was the channel's sixth-most watched program for that week with 0.52 million viewers. On November 4, 2003, the episode was released as part of the eighth-season DVD box set. Vienen was later included on The X-Files Mythology, Volume 4 – Super Soldiers, a DVD collection including episodes involving the alien super soldiers arc.

The episode's casting and plot initially proved controversial when in early 2001, Hispanic activists complained about the often negative portrayal of Latinos on television, particularly in the Law & Order episode "Sunday in the Park with Jorge". In turn, the major broadcasters signed agreements that created a head of diversity at each network. When the episode's title and synopsis were announced, some activists worried that it would further propagate negative stereotypes.

=== Reviews ===
Michael Liedtke and George Avalos of the Contra Costa Times were pleased with the episode and wrote, "The latest episode also contained many of the elements of a classic mythology episode. The stakes were huge and the heroes faced the greatest of hazards. The use of the oil rig created a sense of isolation for Mulder and Doggett, and the paranoia levels were sky-high. We still can't figure out why we haven't seen more episodes along the lines of Vienen during the past three seasons." Emily St. James from The A.V. Club named the episode one of the "10 must-see episodes" of The X-Files, and wrote that it "abruptly makes the series’ alien-conspiracy storyline relevant again." Her review concludes, "[i]t's a fine example of a show past its glory days, nevertheless finding a way to make itself relevant again." S. James later awarded the episode an "A−" and praised—in addition to its refreshing take on the alien mythology—the episode's location, noting that the oil rig's "isolation and man-made island status, was definitely the sort of place that would look and feel different from just about every other episode of the show." She also applauded the dynamic between Mulder and Doggett, and wrote that the episode successfully was a way for "David Duchovny and Fox Mulder to pass the torch to Robert Patrick and John Doggett."

Not all reviews were positive. Robert Shearman, in his book Wanting to Believe: A Critical Guide to The X-Files, Millennium & The Lone Gunmen, rated the episode two stars out of five and wrote that the installment's return to the black oil mythos seemed "out of date". The author also wrote that Mulder and Doggett are "good at running away, which doesn't give either of them much dignity." Paula Vitaris from Cinefantastique gave the episode a negative review and awarded it one-and-a-half stars out of four. She wrote, "as action-adventure, 'Veinen' is so-so. Except for the big 'money shot' explosion at the end, it doesn't exploit the possibilities of the physical location." Meghan Deans of Tor.com ultimately concluded that "while 'Vienen' works hard to hit its marks—a classic villain, a battle of dudes—it can’t measure up to all that’s come before it." She surmised that "the transfer [from Mulder to Doggett] is functional, but the transfer is hollow." She did, however, applaud the return of the black oil.

== Work cited ==
- Bush, Michelle (2008). Myth-X. Lulu. ISBN 9781435746886.
- Hardy, Rod (2005), ""Vienen": Commentary", The X-Files Mythology, Volume 4 – Super Soldiers, 20th Century Fox Home Entertainment
- Hurwitz, Matt; Knowles, Chris (2008). The Complete X-Files. Insight Editions. ISBN 9781933784724.
- Kellner, Douglas (2003). Media Spectacle. Routledge. ISBN 9780415268288.
- Kessenich, Tom (2002). Examination: An Unauthorized Look at Seasons 6–9 of the X-Files. Trafford Publishing. ISBN 9781553698128.
- Shearman, Robert (2009). Wanting to Believe: A Critical Guide to The X-Files, Millennium & The Lone Gunmen. Mad Norwegian Press. ISBN 9780975944691.
