= Existence (The X-Files) =

- The X-Files episode
- Dana Scully giving birth to William, with Monica Reyes helping.
- Episode no.: Season 8 Episode 21
- Directed by: Kim Manners
- Written by: Chris Carter
- Production code: 8ABX21
- Original air date: May 20, 2001
- Running time: 44 minutes

Guest appearances
- Annabeth Gish as Monica Reyes; Mitch Pileggi as Walter Skinner; Nicholas Lea as Alex Krycek; Zachary Ansley as Billy Miles; Adam Baldwin as Knowle Rohrer; Tom Braidwood as Melvin Frohike; Dale Dickey as Game Warden; Dean Haglund as Richard Langly; Bruce Harwood as John Fitzgerald Byers; Shelley Mack as Rebecca; Tom Martin as Pathology Assistant; James Pickens, Jr. as Alvin Kersh; Cynthia Shadix as Alien/Human Hybrid; Jerry Shiban as Baby William; Austin Tichenor as Dr. James Langenhahn; Kirk B. R. Woller as Gene Crane

Episode chronology
← Previous "Essence"	Next → "Nothing Important Happened Today"
- The X-Files season 8

"Existence" is the twenty-first episode and finale of the eighth-season of the science fiction television series The X-Files, and the show's 182nd episode overall. The episode first premiered on Fox in the United States on May 20, 2001, and subsequently aired in the United Kingdom on June 28, 2001, on Sky1. It was written by executive producer Chris Carter and directed by Kim Manners. "Existence" earned a Nielsen household rating of 8.4 and was watched by 14 million viewers, overall. The episode received largely positive reviews from television critics.

The show centers on FBI special agents John Doggett (Robert Patrick) and Dana Scully (Gillian Anderson)—as well as ex-FBI agent Fox Mulder (David Duchovny)—who work on cases linked to the paranormal, called X-Files. In this episode, continuing from the previous episode, "Essence", a new type of alien, called a Super Soldier programmed to destroy any traces of alien involvement on Earth, is introduced. Mulder, Doggett, Walter Skinner (Mitch Pileggi), and Alex Krycek (Nicholas Lea) help Scully escape from Billy Miles with Special Agent Monica Reyes (Annabeth Gish) to a remote town. Shortly after, Skinner kills Krycek and Scully delivers an apparently normal baby with the alien Super Soldiers surrounding her. Without explanation, the aliens leave the area as Mulder arrives.

"Existence", along with previous season eight episodes starting with "Per Manum", introduce the story arc revolving around the "super soldiers", which continued throughout the ninth season. The episode was the last to include David Duchovny's character until the series finale the following year. As such, the last scene with Doggett and Reyes in Kersh's office was intended to show the "New X-Files" without Duchovny.

== Plot ==
A metal box containing the remains of Billy Miles is brought to a coroner. The coroner examines it and notices what appears to be a metal vertebra. After he leaves the room, the metal vertebra begins to spin, growing into what looks like the beginnings of a metallic spine.

In Assistant Director Walter Skinner's office, a surveillance video shows Billy Miles leaving the morgue alive and well. Questioned by Skinner and Agents Mulder and Doggett, Alex Krycek (Nicholas Lea) reveals that Miles is a "new type of alien replacement agent" and there are others like him. Doggett is called out of the office on behalf of his source Knowle Rohrer, who claims that Miles is part of a secret military project to create "super soldiers" and that Scully had a chip put in the back of her neck during her abduction to make her pregnant with the first organic version of a super soldier.

Suddenly, Miles appears at the FBI headquarters. Sensing this, Krycek tries to escape with Skinner in pursuit, but as they manage to escape in an elevator, Miles' hand breaks through the elevator door, injuring Skinner and knocking him unconscious. At the hospital, Doggett relates Rohrer's claims to Mulder, who rejects the story, and the two agents set out to find out how trustworthy Rohrer really is. As they observe the FBI garage, they see Krycek and Rohrer arriving in a car. Doggett covertly pursues Rohrer and sees him meet with FBI Agent Crane. After learning of this, Mulder believes that Crane gave Krycek access to the FBI. Suddenly, Krycek smashes through the car window and crushes Mulder's phone. Krycek threatens Mulder with a gun, but is disarmed and eventually shot dead by Skinner. Doggett confronts Rohrer and Crane but ends up being chased by the two. The pursuit ends violently with Crane being run over and Rohrer crashing his car into the garage wall, going up in flames. Both men are presumed dead but later disappear.

Meanwhile, Dana Scully (Gillian Anderson) and Monica Reyes have arrived in Georgia at the abandoned town to hide Scully and her unborn child. They are detected by a female trooper, who agrees to bring them supplies for the birth. At night, Miles attacks the hideout but is shot by the trooper. Scully goes into labor, while a revived Miles and other alien Super Soldiers surround the house. The trooper, revealed to be another Super Soldier, exclaims: "This baby will be born!" Monica Reyes helps Scully deliver an apparently normal baby, with the Super Soldiers witnessing the birth in a cold stare. Without explanation, the aliens leave the area as Mulder arrives.

At FBI Headquarters, Doggett and Reyes report to an enraged Deputy Director Alvin Kersh, who objects to Doggett co-opting Reyes to the X-Files without his permission. Doggett retorts by informing Kersh that he is himself under investigation after a late night meeting between him, Rohrer and Crane. Mulder visits Scully and her baby, William, at her apartment. After marveling over the baby and discussing recent events, the two share a long, passionate kiss.

== Production ==
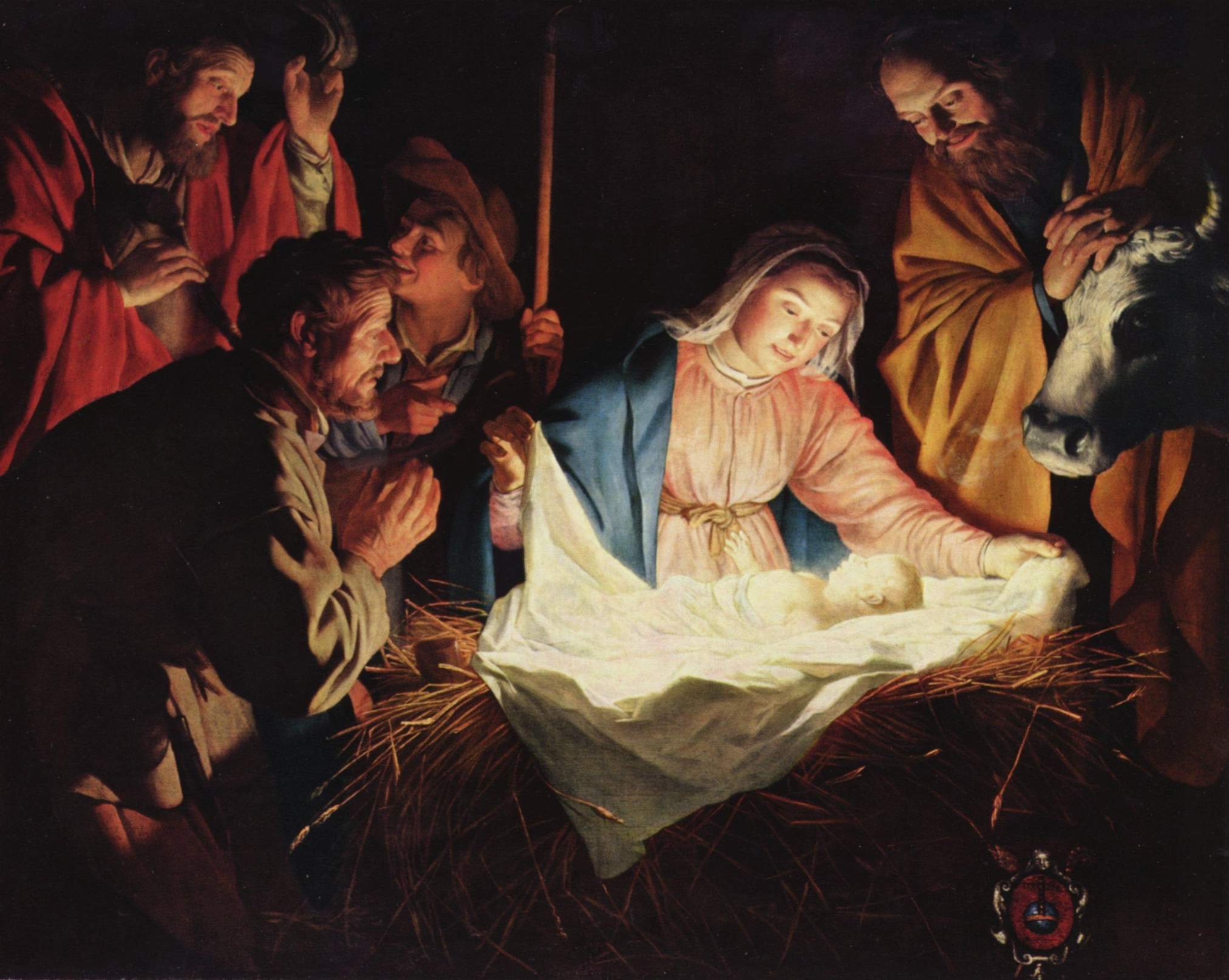
The birth of William was supposed to allude to the birth of Jesus Christ.

=== Writing and casting ===
"Existence" was written during filming, which led to Kim Manners—the director of the episode—helping with the script. Because of this, several of the action scenes, such as the fight at the FBI headquarters, were Manners' ideas. According to Manners, the last scene with Doggett and Reyes in Kersh's office was the "birth" of the "New X-Files" without David Duchovny as a lead. From here on, Monica Reyes became a main character on the show. Star Trek: The Next Generation regular Denise Crosby briefly appears as Scully's gynecologist. The episode features the last appearance of Nicholas Lea, sans the series finale. Reportedly, Lea had become tired of the role and was growing weary of the ambiguous nature of the character. When Lea learned that his character was to be killed off in "Existence", he reportedly welcomed the news. The night the episode aired, Lea wrote on his personal website: "I felt that [Krycek] wasn't getting a fair shake anyway. [...] I wanted more in-depth ideas about the character and it never came to pass. It kind of stopped being fun to play."

The final scene of the episode featuring Mulder and Scully kissing almost was not filmed. Initially, the script called for Mulder to kiss Scully's forehead. Both Duchovny and Manners argued that the scene was "mundane" and that they had "been teasing and doing that bull for so long" that they wanted "a real kiss at this point". During the birth of Scully's child, several allusions to the story of the birth of Jesus are made, including Mulder following a star to find Scully and The Lone Gunmen bringing gifts for the baby, much like the Three Wise Men. Scully's child was portrayed by Jerry Shiban, who is the son of John Shiban, a producer who worked on The X-Files as well as The Lone Gunmen. He was the first of seven babies to represent the character and the only one to play Baby William for a single episode.

=== Effects and filming ===
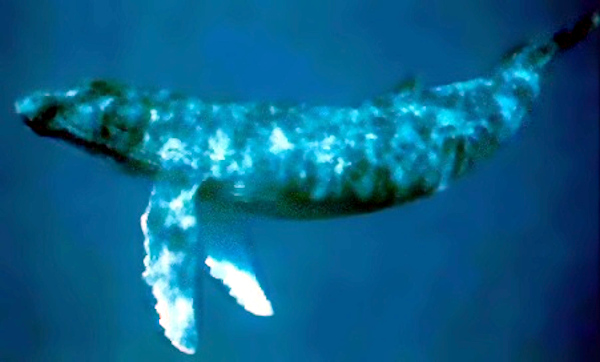
Chris Carter included a scene with whale calls after listening to a Paul Winter album.

The episode featured several elaborate CGI scenes. The first scene with the vertebrae was entirely computer generated by visual effects head John Wash.

According to director Kim Manners, the most difficult scene to shoot was in the elevator with Mitch Pileggi and Nicholas Lea. Conversely, Manners' favorite scene was the one in which Skinner kills Krycek. Manners himself proposed the uniqueness of the shot, which features a CGI bullet going straight through Krycek's head. Extra money was budgeted for Krycek's death. Mitch Pileggi was very happy when he was told he would be killing Krycek; he explained, "when they came to me and told me that I was the one that was going to kill Krycek, I was elated. Not because I wanted Nick to go away or anything, it was just from a character stand-point; Skinner just wanted to kill Krycek so bad." Manners later called it one of his "favorite scenes [he'd] ever directed" and one of the "best scenes [he's] seen in a long time on television."

The car scene with Gillian Anderson and Annabeth Gish was shot at Kanan Road, Malibu. Anderson and Gish sat in what is known as an insert car, while the crew sat in a pickup car in front of them. The birth scene was filmed at Paramount Ranch. Gish had never filmed with guns before joining The X-Files, so the producers hired a retired LAPD officer to teach her more about firearms. She also did some shooting practices before returning to the set. The FBI garage scenes were shot in Century City and took a total of four days to finish.

The episode also contains a scene wherein Reyes serenades Scully by imitating whale calls. Gish later noted that "[Series creator Chris Carter] gave me a tape of whale songs, which was hysterical to be playing in my trailer." Carter was inspired to write the scene after a friend gave him a Paul Winter album that incorporated whale sounds into the music. Carter later explained that, "I just thought it was kind of much like [Reyes'] character to appreciate that."

== Reception ==
=== Ratings ===
"Existence" premiered on May 20, 2001, in the United States on Fox. The episode earned a Nielsen household rating of 8.4 (meaning that it was seen by 8.4% of the nation's estimated households), and it was seen by 14 million viewers, overall. In the United Kingdom, "Existence" premiered on June 28, 2001, and received 0.65 million viewers, placing The X-Files number three in the top ten broadcasts for Sky1 that week behind Star Trek: Voyager and The Simpsons. The episode was later included on The X-Files Mythology, Volume 4 – Super Soldiers, a DVD collection that contains episodes involved with the alien super soldiers arc.

=== Reviews ===
"Existence" received mostly positive reviews from critics. Zack Handlen of The A.V. Club awarded the episode a "B". While offering a positive opinion in regards to the finale as a whole, he felt that "Existence" dragged more so than "Essence", resulting in a less interesting episode. He also felt that the overarching mythology of the series had long ago become too convoluted to make sense, but that the "human pieces of the show still work, and that includes Doggett." Contra Costa Times columnists George Avalos and Michael Liedtke were pleased with the episode noting that the last scene was "beautifully written". Avalos and Liedtke also reacted positively to the death of Alex Krycek at the hands of Skinner, saying it was the best scene in the episode. Despite their praise, however, they stressed that "Existence" was not as exciting as the previous episode, "Essence," or the 1998 The X-Files feature film. Jessica Morgan of Television Without Pity gave the episode an A− rating, noting that "season eight's finale goes out with a big fat juicy kiss between Mulder and Scully, at long last". Gareth Wigmore of TV Zone was positive toward both "Essence" and "Existence". Wigmore gave the episodes a 9 out of 10 rating and wrote "the reason that this two-parter works is that its plot is simple enough for the audience to still have a handle on".

Not all reviews were positive. Robert Shearman, in his book Wanting to Believe: A Critical Guide to The X-Files, Millennium & The Lone Gunmen, gave the episode a more mixed two-and-a-half stars out of five. Paula Vitaris from Cinefantastique gave the episode a scathing review and awarded it no stars out of four. She heavily derided the plot, and wrote, "Thus endeth the Mulder-and-Scully era of The X-Files, and what a load of sanctimonious crap it turned out to be!"

== Bibliography ==
- Hurwitz, Matt; Knowles, Chris (2008). The Complete X-Files. Insight Editions. ISBN 978-1-933784-80-9.
- Kessenich, Tom (2002). Examination: An Unauthorized Look at Seasons 6–9 of the X-Files. Trafford Publishing. ISBN 1-55369-812-6.
- Shearman, Robert (2009). Wanting to Believe: A Critical Guide to The X-Files, Millennium & The Lone Gunmen. Mad Norwegian Press. ISBN 978-0-9759446-9-1.
