= The X-Files Mythology, Volume 4 – Super Soldiers =

- Season 4
- Region 1 DVD cover
- No. of episodes: 14

Series chronology
- ← Previous; Volume 3 – Colonization

The X-Files Mythology – Volume 4 collection is the fourth DVD release containing selected episodes from the eighth and the ninth seasons of the American science fiction television series The X-Files. The episodes collected in the release form the end of the series' mythology, and are centered on those that involve the alien "Super Soldiers" and Dana Scully's (Gillian Anderson) son, William.

The collection contains seven episodes from the eighth season and seven from the ninth. The episodes follow the investigations of paranormal-related cases, or X-Files, by Federal Bureau of Investigation (FBI) special agents Dana Scully (Gillian Anderson) and John Doggett (Robert Patrick), following Scully's former partner Fox Mulder's (David Duchovny) abduction by aliens. The two are assisted by Assistant Director Walter Skinner (Mitch Pileggi) and Agent Monica Reyes (Annabeth Gish). Events covered in the episodes include: the return, death, and resurrection of Mulder; the birth of Scully's child, William; the discovery of the "Super Soldier" conspiracy; the discovery of the remains of a space ship in Canada; Scully's choice to give William up for adoption; and Mulder's trial, conviction, escape, and discovery of the truth.

The collection contains the final episodes in the series' mythology, or fictional overarching story. The release features the closure of most of the series' long-running arcs. Production for the episodes was drastically affected after co-star Duchovny left the show. Released on November 22, 2005, the collection received mixed to negative reviews from critics. Adam Baldwin, Chris Owens, Nicholas Lea, Laurie Holden, and William B. Davis all play supporting roles in the collection.

== Plot summary ==
When Dana Scully (Gillian Anderson) learns that several women have reportedly been abducted and impregnated with alien babies, she begins to question her own pregnancy. John Doggett (Robert Patrick) introduces Scully to Monica Reyes (Annabeth Gish), an FBI specialist in ritualistic crime, shortly before Fox Mulder's (David Duchovny) deceased body suddenly appears in a forest at night. Following Mulder's funeral, Assistant Director Walter Skinner (Mitch Pileggi) is threatened by Alex Krycek (Nicholas Lea) that he must kill Scully's baby before it is born. Billy Miles, a multiple abductee who disappeared on the same night as Mulder, is returned deceased but his dead body is resurrected and restored to full health. Mulder also returns from death, with Scully supervising his recovery. Fully rejuvenated, Mulder investigates several X-Files, against orders to do so, but soon gets fired, leaving Doggett in charge of the cases. Mulder continues to provide input in an unofficial capacity.

Reluctantly accepting Krycek's assistance, Mulder, Doggett and Skinner learn that an alien virus recently created in secret by members of the United States government have replaced several humans, including Miles and several high-ranking FBI personnel, with so-called alien "Super Soldiers". Krycek claims that the soldiers are virtually unstoppable aliens who want to make sure that humans will not survive the colonization of Earth. They have learned that Scully's baby is a miraculously special child and are afraid that it may be greater than them. When Miles arrives at the FBI Headquarters, Mulder, Doggett, Skinner and Krycek help Scully to escape along with Reyes who drives her to a remote farm. Shortly after Skinner kills Krycek, Scully delivers an apparently normal baby while the alien "Super Soldiers" surround her. Without explanation, the aliens leave the area as Mulder arrives. While Doggett and Reyes report to the FBI Headquarters, Mulder takes Scully and their newborn son, William, back to her apartment.

Mulder goes into hiding, Scully is again reassigned to the FBI Academy, and Reyes becomes Doggett's new FBI partner at the X-Files office. Doggett, Scully, and Reyes discover a conspiracy to place Chloramine in the nation's water, causing mutations and creating "Super Soldiers". This leads them to a clandestine laboratory where a secret experiment is taking place on board, with connections to Scully's child, William. The X-Files office's investigation is hampered by Deputy Director Alvin Kersh (James Pickens, Jr.) and Assistant Director Brad Follmer (Cary Elwes). Hopeful about reuniting with Mulder, a complete stranger, "Shadow Man" (Terry O'Quinn), offers his service to drive Mulder out of hiding. Scully takes the offer, but near gets herself and Mulder killed when it is revealed the man is a Super Soldier. Later on, Scully, Doggett and Reyes find evidence of a dangerous UFO cult which has found a spacecraft similar to one Scully studied in Africa two years ago. The cult kidnaps William, but is destroyed when the baby's crying activates the ship, killing everyone in the cult, sans William.

Doggett finds a strange disfigured man in the X-Files office. Initially, Doggett believes the man is Mulder, but he is revealed to Jeffrey Spender (Chris Owens), Mulder's half-brother. Spender sticks a needle into William, which the other agents believe to be a virus of some kind, but is later revealed to be a cure for William's powers. Mulder returns from hiding to only be discovered looking for classified information at an army base and, after allegedly killing an apparently indestructible "Super Soldier" Knowle Rohrer (Adam Baldwin), he is placed on trial to defend the X-Files and himself. But with the help of Kersh, Scully, Reyes, Doggett, Spender, Marita Covarrubias (Laurie Holden) and Gibson Praise (Jeff Gulka), Mulder breaks out. Mulder and Scully travel to New Mexico to find an old "wise man", who is later revealed to be The Smoking Man (William B. Davis), who tells them that the aliens will arrive in 2012. Doggett and Reyes aid Mulder and Scully in escaping the FBI, and the two are last seen together in a motel room facing an uncertain future.

== Production ==
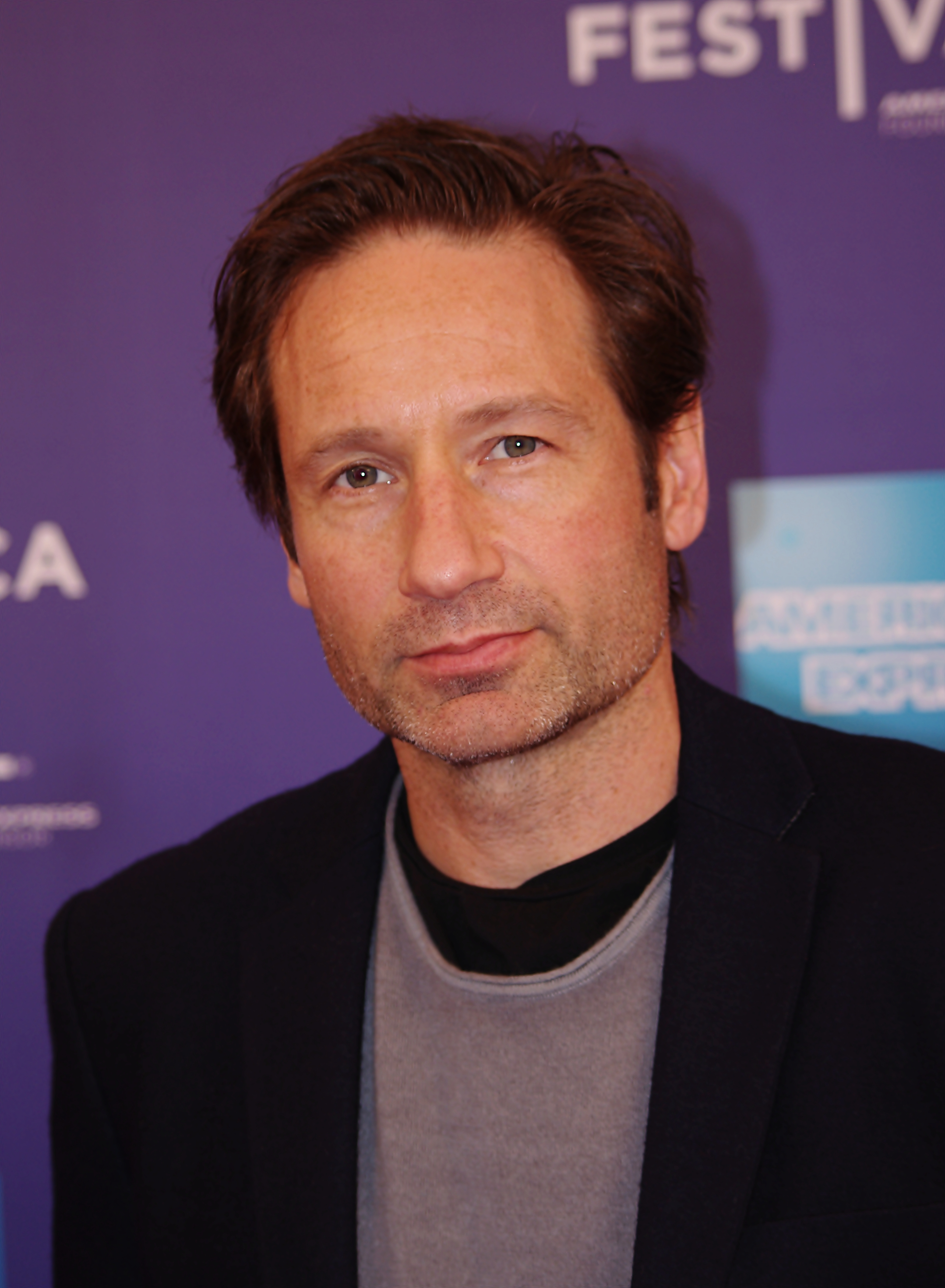
The collection features co-star David Duchovny in only half of the episodes, due to him leaving after the eighth season.

After settling his contract dispute with Fox, Duchovny quit full-time participation in the show after the seventh season. In order to explain Mulder's absence, Duchovny's character was abducted by aliens in the seventh season finale, "Requiem." After several rounds of contractual discussions, Duchovny agreed to return for a total of 11 eighth season episodes. Thus, "Per Manum" marked the return of Duchovny as Mulder, although he had appeared briefly in flashback appearances and small cameos. Series creator Chris Carter later argued that Mulder's absences from the series did not affect the characterization, noting that "there are characters who can be powerful as absent centers, as Mulder was through the eight and ninth seasons."

After the end of the eighth season, Duchovny announced that he would leave the show for good. In addition, lead actress Anderson's contract also expired at the end of the eighth season. Anderson had expressed her growing disinterest in the series ever since the beginning of the eighth season, saying "For a lot of people, if you don't like your job, you can quit your job, I don't necessarily have that option." Anderson cited the fact that "eight years is a long time" as a contributing factor to her indifference. However, Carter soon changed his position and announced he would remain on the show and continue only if Anderson agreed to do another season. Eventually, Fox offered Anderson a "generous" incentive to stay, resulting in the retention of Carter and Anderson and a final season of the show. With the departure of Duchovny and limited use of Anderson, the show garnered much criticism by fans and critics alike, saying the bond between Mulder and Scully was what actually kept the show together for the first seven seasons of the show.

Going into the ninth season, the producers decided to drastically change the show. The style of the opening credits in "Nothing Important Happened Today" were changed from the original credits, which, more or less, had been the same for the previous eight seasons. The credits included new graphics as well as new cards for Gish and Pileggi. The finale episode of the series, "The Truth", was written by series creator Carter; he later noted, "It's the end—you don't get another chance. So you'd better put everything you've ever wanted to put in into the episode. There were things to distract us from what was really going on. The band was breaking up." He expounded on the idea, saying, "Frank [Spotnitz] and I [decided] it was probably time to go […] it was strange to be writing these things knowing it was the last time we'd see Scully doing certain things or hear Mulder saying certain things." Spotnitz explained, "What was kind of nice that Chris made the announcement in January is that we had times to wrap our minds around the end and plan for it and give all of the characters their due." Gish later said, "I have a great respect for the elegant in which they're closing the curtain". Bruce Harwood called the finale the "passing of a generation".

== Reception ==
The collection, as well as the episodes themselves, received mixed to negative reviews from critics. Monica Kuebler of Exclaim! gave the collection a rather negative review and noted that it closed on a "lacklustre note". Furthermore, she wrote that the main issue with the release was that "the hardcore fans [of the series] had come to see The X-Files as Mulder and Scully and understandably weren't quick to swallow a couple of new characters running the department." Ultimately, she concluded that the poor episodes and the lack of bonus features included with the collection were proof that "Fox seems eager to wash their hands of the disappointing demise of the show".

Sabadino Parker from PopMatters wrote negatively about the mythology of the last two seasons, noting that "story itself became even more convoluted" and that "the past two seasons should never have happened." Entertainment Weekly reviewer Ken Tucker speculated that Chris Carter was the only one who seemed to understand the show's complex mytharc. Joyce Millman from The New York Times called the storyline involving Scully's child—which left her "haunted and irritable"—"a sad misuse of the radiant Anderson". The A.V. Club was highly critical of the final season and its mythology story, calling them a "clumsy mish-mash of stuff that had once worked and new serialized storylines about so-called 'super soldiers'".

== Episodes ==
No. in set	No. in series	Title	Directed by	Written by	Original release date	Prod. code
1	174	"Per Manum"	Kim Manners	Chris Carter & Frank Spotnitz	February 18, 2001	8ABX13
When a mysterious man claims his wife was fertilised with an alien baby, and then killed and the baby stolen; Doggett is skeptical, while Scully realises that the woman's story is similar to her own. While Doggett attempts to understand the motives of his friend and government contact Knowle Rohrer, Scully questions her own pregnancy and its conception.
2	175	"This is Not Happening"	Kim Manners	Chris Carter & Frank Spotnitz	February 25, 2001	8ABX14
Doggett calls on another agent, Monica Reyes, to assist in the Mulder case, but Scully's fears about finding him come to a head with the sudden recovery of abductees seized at the same time.
3	176	"Deadalive"	Tony Wharmby	Chris Carter & Frank Spotnitz	April 1, 2001	8ABX15
Three months after Mulder's funeral, a former abductee awakens from the dead and Scully pins her hopes on resurrecting her partner; while Skinner is offered a loathsome deal by Krycek.
4	177	"Three Words"	Tony Wharmby	Chris Carter & Frank Spotnitz	April 8, 2001	8ABX16
Mulder secretly conducts his own investigation after a man is gunned down on the White House lawn attempting to inform the President of a planned alien invasion. However, he is soon in over his head as he tries to expose further evidence of colonization.
5	179	"Vienen"	Rod Hardy	Steven Maeda	April 29, 2001	8ABX18
Mulder and Doggett are asked to investigate several deaths aboard an oil rig, but Mulder is convinced the rig is carrying an alien black oil; meanwhile a heavily pregnant Scully attempts to protect Mulder in absentia.
6	181	"Essence"	Kim Manners	Chris Carter	May 13, 2001	8ABX20
Mulder, Skinner and Doggett come up against the horrible consequences of the Syndicate's pact with the aliens, as a hybrid attempts to erase all evidence of the tests—including Scully's soon-to-be-born baby. The men call on Reyes, and—reluctantly—Alex Krycek to help them.
7	182	"Existence"	Kim Manners	Chris Carter	May 20, 2001	8ABX21
Mulder, Doggett and Skinner face off with the alien replicants as they desperately try to expose the conspiracy within the FBI. Meanwhile Scully goes into labour in a remote location, but Reyes soon learns they may be no safer there.
8	183	"Nothing Important Happened Today"	Kim Manners	Chris Carter & Frank Spotnitz	November 11, 2001	9ABX01
Doggett begins his investigation of Deputy Director Kersh and search for Mulder. He encounters obstructions at every turn and no one is willing to cooperate.
9	184	"Nothing Important Happened Today II"	Tony Wharmby	Chris Carter & Frank Spotnitz	November 18, 2001	9ABX02
Shannon McMahon, a former Marine associate of Doggett's, reveals to Doggett that she is a "Super Soldier". This leads them to a clandestine laboratory where secret experiments are taking place on board on a naval ship.
10	188	"Trust No 1"	Tony Wharmby	Chris Carter & Frank Spotnitz	January 6, 2002	9ABX06
Scully is hopeful about reuniting with Mulder when a complete stranger offers new information about what drove him into hiding. Yet her trust in the stranger may place Mulder in even more danger.
11	191	"Provenance"	Kim Manners	Chris Carter & Frank Spotnitz	March 3, 2002	9ABX09
When rubbings from the spaceship resurface, the FBI hides its investigation from the X-Files. Meanwhile, Scully is forced to take drastic measures when she discovers a threat to William.
12	192	"Providence"	Chris Carter	Chris Carter & Frank Spotnitz	March 10, 2002	9ABX10
Distrustful of both Skinner and Follmer, Scully circumvents the FBI's investigation into the kidnapping and does her own, assisted by Reyes and the Lone Gunmen. Her fears are heightened when she learns Mulder may be dead, and William is kidnapped by the alien cult.
13	198	"William"	David Duchovny	Story by : David Duchovny & Frank Spotnitz & Chris Carter; Teleplay by : Chris Carter	April 28, 2002	9ABX16
Doggett finds a strange disfigured man in the X-Files office, and—on a whim of Scully's—they test his DNA. But the surprising answers they find become even more surprising when William's life is put on the line.
14	201	"The Truth"	Kim Manners	Chris Carter	May 19, 2002	9ABX19
15	202	"The Truth"	Kim Manners	Chris Carter	May 19, 2002	9ABX20
Mulder is placed under military arrest, but with the surprising help of Deputy Director Kersh, Scully, Reyes, Doggett, Marita Covarrubias, Gibson Praise, and Jeffrey Spender, Mulder's broken out. Mulder and Scully travel to New Mexico where Black helicopters destroy a Pueblo—and The Smoking Man (William B. Davis).

== Special features ==
The X-Files Mythology, Volume 4 – Super Soldiers
Set details		Special features	
15 Episodes^{[A]}; 4-Disc Set; 1.78:1 Aspect Ratio; Subtitles: English; English (Dolby Digital 5.1 Surround)		Audio Commentaries (Dolby Digital 2.0 Stereo); "Deadalive" – Frank Spotnitz; "Vienen" – Rod Hardy; Threads of Mythology; Mythology Timeline	
Release dates
Region 1	Region 2	Region 3	Region 4
September 22, 2005	TBA	TBA	TBA

== Notes ==
A. In some regions, the last episode, "The Truth" is split up into two episodes, and not one.
