= This Is Not Happening =

This Is Not Happening may refer to:

- "This Is Not Happening" (The X-Files), a 2001 episode
- This Is Not Happening (TV series), by Comedy Central
