= Essence (The X-Files) =

- The X-Files episode
- Episode no.: Season 8 Episode 20
- Directed by: Kim Manners
- Written by: Chris Carter
- Production code: 8ABX20
- Original air date: May 13, 2001
- Running time: 44 minutes

Guest appearances
- Annabeth Gish as Monica Reyes; Nicholas Lea as Alex Krycek; Mitch Pileggi as Walter Skinner; Zachary Ansley as Billy Miles; Sheila Larken as Margaret Scully; Jay Acovone as Duffy Haskell; Steven Anderson as Dr. James Parenti; Denise Crosby as Dr. Mary Speake; Frances Fisher as Lizzy Gill; Karon Kearney as 2nd Woman Party-Goer; David Purdham as Dr. Lev; Arlene Pileggi as 1st Woman Party-Goer; Kirk B. R. Woller as Agent Gene Crane

Episode chronology
| ← Previous "Alone" | Next → "Existence" |
- The X-Files season 8

"Essence" is the twentieth and penultimate episode of the eighth season and the 181st episode overall of the science fiction television series The X-Files. The episode first aired in the United States on May 13, 2001, on Fox, and subsequently aired in the United Kingdom. It was written by executive producer Chris Carter and directed by Kim Manners. "Essence" earned Nielsen rating of 7.7 and was viewed by 12.8 million viewers. The episode received largely positive reviews from critics.

The show centers on FBI special agents John Doggett (Robert Patrick) and Dana Scully (Gillian Anderson)—as well as ex-FBI agent Fox Mulder (David Duchovny)—who work on cases linked to the paranormal, called X-Files. In this episode, Mulder, Walter Skinner (Mitch Pileggi), and Doggett come up against the horrible consequences of the Syndicate's pact with the aliens, as Billy Miles (Zachary Ansley)—now reprogrammed as a Supersoldier—attempts to erase all evidence of the tests—including Scully's soon-to-be-born baby. Upon hearing information from Alex Krycek (Nicholas Lea), the men reluctantly call upon him as well as Monica Reyes (Annabeth Gish) to help them.

"Essence" is a story milestone for the series. It was one of the later season eight episodes, starting with "Per Manum", that introduced the story arc about super-soldiers, which would continue throughout the ninth season. The episode was the first part of two, and concluded with the season finale "Existence". In addition, Nicholas Lea reprises his role as Alex Krycek, who temporarily switches sides and aids Mulder and Scully.

== Plot ==
While preparing for Dana Scully's (Gillian Anderson) baby shower, her mother Margaret (Sheila Larken) invites a woman named Lizzy Gill to help Scully around her apartment. Unbeknownst to Scully, Gill tampers with her pregnancy medication. Meanwhile, Billy Miles (Zachary Aynsley), satisfied with the research conducted at Zeus Genetics, kills the head scientist, Dr. Lev, and burns the laboratory. All of the evidence at Zeus Genetics is destroyed, including the viable hybrid fetus. Fox Mulder (David Duchovny) informs John Doggett (Robert Patrick) of the fire, and asks to go along to survey the crime scene. Mulder reveals that Lev is connected to Scully's former obstetrician, Dr. Parenti. While searching Parenti's office, the agents find another storage room containing hybrid fetuses. They confront Parenti, who denies everything.

Back at Scully's apartment, Gill leaves for the day. She gets into a car driven by Duffy Haskell, and tells him she thinks Scully trusts her. At the lab, Agent Crane derides Doggett for dealing with Mulder. Mulder and Doggett head back to Parenti's office, during which time Miles appears and decapitates Parenti. As they enter Parenti's office, they confront Miles—Mulder is thrown through a glass barrier while Doggett shoots him several times with no apparent effect. While Mulder and Doggett are distracted, Miles escapes. The two go to Scully's house to regroup. Gill overhears and contacts Haskell, who is at an illegal human cloning facility. At the other end, Haskell is also decapitated by Miles.

As Doggett, Mulder, and Walter Skinner (Mitch Pileggi) survey Haskell's murder scene, Scully catches Gill in the act of tampering with her medication. Later, Gill confesses that she, along with Haskell and others, have been monitoring Scully's pregnancy as part of the alien colonists' plans. However, she tells the agents that Scully's baby is a perfect human child with no human weaknesses. Mulder, fearing for Scully's safety, prepares to take her away. Doggett and Crane receive a call from Miles claiming to surrender, but this turns out to be a distraction. Miles instead goes after Scully, just as she and Mulder escape. As Miles is about to catch Mulder and Scully, Alex Krycek (Nicholas Lea) runs him over and takes them to Doggett and Skinner, just before Miles gets back up.

Krycek states that Miles is one of a new type of aliens that are trying to wipe out humanity's ability to survive the invasion—including Scully's baby, which Krycek states is a special child that the aliens fear. Mulder tells Doggett to send for help. Monica Reyes (Annabeth Gish) arrives as Miles shows up at the J. Edgar Hoover Building. Scully is able to sneak out of the building with the help of Krycek, Doggett and Reyes. Mulder and Skinner, meanwhile, lead Miles to the roof, where Mulder pushes him off into a waiting garbage truck, which then compacts him. Scully and Reyes pull away. The episode ends with Crane pointing them to safety, then turning around, revealing to the camera that he is a Super Soldier.

== Production ==
"Essence" was written by series creator Chris Carter. The episode, which was the first part of two and concluded with the season finale "Existence", was written during a time of uncertainty for the series. Near the end of season eight, it was unclear whether or not the show would continue onto a ninth season. Carter had maintained for sometime that he would not continue the show without lead actor David Duchovny. However, Duchovny announced that after the end of the eighth season, he would leave the show for good. In addition, lead actress Gillian Anderson's contract also expired at the end of the eighth season. Anderson had expressed her growing disinterest in the series ever since the beginning of the eighth season, saying "For a lot of people, if you don't like your job, you can quit your job, I don't necessarily have that option." Anderson cited the fact that "eight years is a long time" as a contributing factor to her indifference. However, Carter soon changed his position and announced he would remain on the show and continue only if Anderson agreed to do another season. Eventually, Fox offered Anderson a "generous" incentive to stay, resulting in the retention of Carter and Anderson and a final season of the show.

The episode marks the return of Nicholas Lea as Alex Krycek. In previous episodes, Krycek was one of the series' main antagonists. However, in "Essence", he temporarily switches sides. As such, portraying actor Lea explains the character's motivation: "Toward the end, he realizes that it's possible that the world could completely go down the tubes—then he's got a stake in trying to keep that from happening. That's when he starts giving the information to Mulder so that he can use it."

== Reception ==
=== Ratings ===
"Essence" first aired on Fox on May 13, 2001. The episode earned a Nielsen household rating of 7.7, meaning that it was seen by 7.7% of the nation's estimated households. The episode was seen by 12.8 million viewers. The episode ranked as the 41st most-watched episode for the week ending April 8. In the United Kingdom and Ireland, the episode made its first televised appearance on June 28, 2001, on Sky1 and was the third most watched program that week, receiving 0.65 million viewers. Fox promoted the episode with a poster parodying the 1968 horror movie Rosemary's Baby. The episode was later included on The X-Files Mythology, Volume 4 – Super Soldiers, a DVD collection that contains episodes involved with the alien super soldiers arc.

=== Reviews ===
"Essence" received mostly positive reviews from critics. Zack Handlen of The A.V. Club awarded the episode a "B+", noting that while much of the episode was a "blur", it was nonetheless exciting. Handlen was complimentary towards the installment's "tremendous sense of purpose [that] builds to a fever pitch that makes questions of who exactly wants what largely irrelevant." While he offered a pessimistic opinion in regards to the series' mythology as a whole, Handlen concluded that the eighth season's sense of purpose, as exemplified in "Essence", made the episode successful. George Avalos and Michael Liedtke of Contra Costa Times praised the episode, writing "where have nifty episodes like ["Essence"] been the last two years?" Tom Kessenich, in his book Examinations, gave the episode a largely positive review. Praising the storyline, he noted that "Thanks to 'Essence', I've become a believer again." Gareth Wigmore of TV Zone was positive toward both "Essence" and "Existence". Wigmore gave the episodes a 9 out of 10 rating and wrote "the reason that this two-parter works is that its plot is simple enough for the audience to still have a handle on".

Not all reviews were so positive, however. Robert Shearman, in his book Wanting to Believe: A Critical Guide to The X-Files, Millennium & The Lone Gunmen, gave the episode a more mixed two stars out of five. The author cited dense dialogue and bizarre characterization—most notably the fact that "there's usually one FBI agent so angry that he interrupts [...] only to be stopped by a calmer counterpart"—as detractors. Shearman, however, did praise the final ten minutes, noting that the final act was "so good [...] that it almost makes up for the episode which sadly returns to the style of the traditional mytharc exposition". Paula Vitaris from Cinefantastique gave the episode a scathing review and awarded it no stars out of four. She heavily derided the plot, noting that the episode turned Scully into a "passive, mostly silent Virgin Mary who is about to give birth to… Jesus Christ." She concluded that the episode "raise[ed] the [misogyny] to a whole new level".

== Bibliography ==
- Hurwitz, Matt; Knowles, Chris (2008). The Complete X-Files. Insight Editions. ISBN 978-1933784809.
- Kessenich, Tom (2002). Examination: An Unauthorized Look at Seasons 6–9 of the X-Files. Trafford Publishing. ISBN 1553698126.
- Shearman, Robert (2009). Wanting to Believe: A Critical Guide to The X-Files, Millennium & The Lone Gunmen. Mad Norwegian Press. ISBN 978-0975944691.

This article incorporates material derived from the "Essence" article on the X-Files wiki at Fandom (formerly Wikia) and is licensed under the Creative Commons Attribution-Share Alike 3.0 License (March 7, 2012).
