= Alone (The X-Files) =

- The X-Files episode
- Episode no.: Season 8 Episode 19
- Directed by: Frank Spotnitz
- Written by: Frank Spotnitz
- Production code: 8ABX19
- Original air date: May 6, 2001
- Running time: 44 minutes

Guest appearances
- Mitch Pileggi as Walter Skinner; Jay Caputo as Salamander Man; Zach Grenier as Herman Stites; Jolie Jenkins as Leyla Harrison; Lisa Kaseman as Pathology Assistant; Tony Ketcham as Gary Sacks; James Otis as Arlen Sacks

Episode chronology
← Previous "Vienen"	Next → "Essence"
- The X-Files season 8

"Alone" is the nineteenth episode of the eighth season and the 180th episode overall of the science fiction television series The X-Files. The episode first aired in the United States on May 6, 2001, on Fox, and subsequently aired in the United Kingdom on Sky1 on June 14, 2001. It was written and directed by executive producer Frank Spotnitz. "Alone" earned a Nielsen household rating of 7.5 and was viewed by 12.7 million viewers. It received mixed to positive reviews from television critics.

The show centers on FBI special agents John Doggett (Robert Patrick) and Dana Scully (Gillian Anderson)—as well as ex-FBI agent Fox Mulder (David Duchovny)—who work on cases linked to the paranormal, called X-Files. In this episode, Doggett is paired with an enthusiastic young agent named Leyla Harrison who knows everything about the X-Files, when Scully goes on maternity leave. Harrison's apotheosis of Mulder and Scully leads to Doggett learning a thing or two. But when Harrison and Doggett disappear, Mulder defies orders in an attempt to find them.

"Alone" marked the directorial debut of Spotnitz, who had been a writer on the show for several years. In addition, the episode would be the last Monster-of-the-Week episode to feature an appearance by David Duchovny as Fox Mulder until the Season 10 revival. The character of Leyla Harrison was named after an X-Files fan who died of cancer in 2001.

== Plot ==
In Ellicott, New York, Arlen Sacks is killed by an unknown creature that sprays venom on its victims, and his son Gary goes missing. In the meantime, at FBI Headquarters, Dana Scully (Gillian Anderson), preparing for maternity leave, packs up her belongings at the X-Files office. She finds a medallion commemorating the Apollo 11 space flight that was given to her for her birthday by Fox Mulder (David Duchovny). Scully gives John Doggett (Robert Patrick) the medallion, explaining that it symbolizes teamwork. After Scully leaves, Special Agent Leyla Harrison (Jolie Jenkins) arrives and tells Doggett that she is his new partner. The two are soon assigned to investigate Sacks's bizarre murder.

At the crime scene, Doggett finds evidence of the venom, which is sent to an FBI lab for analysis. In her previous job Harrison processed Mulder and Scully's travel expenses during their time on the X-Files, and has thus gained an encyclopedic knowledge of their investigations. Following a wooded trail from the crime scene, the agents stumble upon an upscale mansion and make their way inside. A strange creature clinging to the wall secretly observes their every move. Doggett discovers a study full of biology journals and a copy of the anthropologist Richard Leakey's book The Sixth Extinction. He pulls out his gun, sensing that something is amiss. Finding Harrison in the hallway, he instructs her to position herself outside the house while he tries to flush the creature. Moments after Doggett instructs Harrison to stand guard he hears gun shots being fired. Rushing outside, he cannot find Harrison anywhere in the yard. He walks farther to the edge and falls through a trap door at the edge of the front lawn.

During an autopsy, Scully correctly deduces that Sacks was blinded by reptile venom. Meanwhile, Doggett and Harrison, having fallen into old bootlegger tunnels below the mansion grounds, encounter the creature and are sprayed with venom, temporarily blinding them. The two find Gary, in dire need of medical attention, nearby. Noting the agents' absence, Mulder searches the area around the mansion for clues and encounters the owner, Herman Stites, who identifies himself as a biologist. Mulder soon leaves the area as Stites notices Doggett about to escape the tunnels, knocking him back in. Mulder waits in his car in Stites' driveway until dark, telling Scully that he found the Apollo medallion near his estate and is convinced Doggett is somewhere nearby. He spots the creature and chases it to the mansion, where it climbs up to a second floor. Mulder follows the creature into the house and down into the tunnels, where he encounters Doggett and Harrison. With the creature approaching, Mulder tells the still-blinded Doggett to open fire at him on his command. The blinded Doggett then shoots the creature as it leaps at Mulder; the deceased creature then turns into Stites.

Later, Scully and Mulder meet Doggett, who has now fully recovered, at the hospital. He tells them that Harrison will make a full recovery as well but that she is transferring herself off of the X-Files. Mulder attempts to give Doggett the Apollo medallion, but Doggett insists that it be given to Harrison instead. Mulder and Scully then present it to Harrison together, who accepts it in awe.

== Production ==
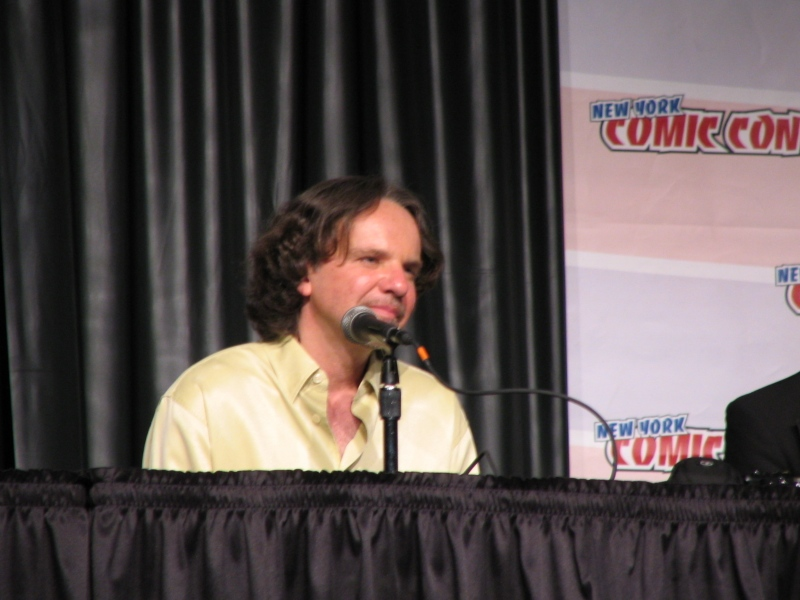
"Alone" was written and directed by executive producer Frank Spotnitz.

=== Writing and directing ===
The episode was written by executive producer Frank Spotnitz, and marked his directorial debut. Because of his position as both the writer of the episode and the director, Spotnitz later noted that it was hard to achieve perfection when filming the episode. However, he did note that, as both the writer and director, he had more creative control than usual. Originally Spotnitz did not have plans to direct the episode, but he was encouraged to do so by David Duchovny; Duchovny reminded Spotnitz that it would be the last Monster-of-the-Week (stand-alone) episode to feature his character, Fox Mulder. After production and shooting was finalized, the rough cut of "Alone" was nine minutes over time and in order to compensate for the time, various sections were cut during final editing. Robert Patrick was very pleased with Spotnitz's work, stating, "You're talking about some incredibly intelligent individuals, and they were very willing to let you, as an artist, discover what they were trying to do with the role. That's a wonderful environment to work in."

For the episode, Gillian Anderson's character Dana Scully was written off as a member of the X-Files office, since the next season would focus on the "new" X-Files headed by Doggett and Monica Reyes (Annabeth Gish). Because of this change, Spotnitz called "Alone" the last of the "old" X-Files stand-alone episodes. As with many other episodes, Duchovny did not want his character to have all the answers, giving the reason that it looked too easy for him. Duchovny and Spotnitz later had a long discussion on how to remove the scenes or tweak them. Unfortunately, because the episode was the last stand-alone episode to feature the character of Fox Mulder, Duchovny did not care as much as "usual" about creating a "mystery" for the episode.

=== Casting ===
Walter Skinner (Mitch Pileggi) appeared in the episode only because Spotnitz wanted a chance to direct an episode that featured his character. However, because the episode was over time, Spotnitz ended up editing a large majority of his more "prominent" scenes out. In addition, another section that was scripted but ultimately cut was a scene between Anderson and Duchovny. Jolie Jenkins' character, Leyla Harrison, was created and named in memory of a The X-Files internet fan and prolific writer of fan fiction of the same name, who died of cancer on February 10, 2001. Jenkins' characterization, according to Spotnitz, "br[ought] out the Clint [Eastwood] in Robert Patrick", and her performance was called "near perfection" by Spotnitz during the audio commentary for this episode.

Due to Harrison's extensive knowledge of the X-Files, the episode contains several references to previous episodes. While looking through her desk drawer, Scully finds the merged coin from the sixth-season entry "Dreamland"; the Apollo 11 space flight medallion, which was given to her by Mulder in the fourth-season episode "Tempus Fugit"; and her dog Queequeg's name tag, which she was given in the third-season episode "Clyde Bruckman's Final Repose". While investigating, Harrison mentions a liver-eating mutant that produced bile and died under an escalator, a reference to Eugene Victor Tooms, who appeared in the first-season episodes "Squeeze" and "Tooms"; aliens that shed their skin and leave behind a residue similar to mucus, a reference to the alien from "The Beginning"; and subterranean men in Florida who took people underground, as featured in "Detour". While searching through Stites' house, Doggett finds a book entitled The Sixth Extinction, a potential reference to the seventh-season episode of the same name. In the episode's final scene, Harrison asks Mulder how he and Scully managed to return to America after escaping from a spaceship in Antarctica, a reference to an event that took place at the end of the 1998 X-Files feature film.

== Reception ==
"Alone" debuted on Fox on May 6, 2001, in the United States. The episode earned a Nielsen household rating of 7.5, meaning that it was seen by 7.5% of the nation's estimated households. The episode was seen by 12.7 million viewers. The episode ranked as the 35th-most watched episode for the week ending May 6. On June 14, 2001, the episode premiered in the United Kingdom and Ireland on Sky1 and received 480,000 viewers making it the sixth-most watched episode that week, behind Star Trek: Voyager and The Simpsons.

The episode was met with mixed to positive reviews. Zack Handlen of The A.V. Club awarded the episode an "A−", applauded Duchovny's apparent energy to be acting on the series once again. However, he felt that the "overtness" of the episode resulted in many scenes coming off as too on-the-nose or strained. Television Without Pity gave the episode a B− rating but slightly criticized the way Fox was using Duchovny, sardonically writing, "I don't know if you're aware of this, but David Duchovny stars in The X-Files. Did you know that? Because they've really been keeping it under wraps at Fox."

Robert Shearman, in his book Wanting to Believe: A Critical Guide to The X-Files, Millennium & The Lone Gunmen, rated the episode three-and-a-half stars out of five and called it "an exercise in nostalgia". The author called the episode "touching" and noted that many of the in-jokes in the script, such as Harrison asking the agents how they got back from Antarctica, were "very funny". Shearman, however, did slightly critique the way the X-Files were presented noting that the case was comparatively a "rather low-key humdrum affair". Tom Kessenich, in his book Examinations, gave the episode a positive review, writing, "The future of The X-Files is unsettled, but 'Alone' served as a pleasant reminder of what has come before and why the journey to this point has, for the most part, been so wonderful."

Not all reviews were positive. Paula Vitaris from Cinefantastique gave the episode a largely negative review and awarded it one star out of four. She derided the plot, writing "Why? Who knows? Who cares?" Vitaris further criticized the episode incorporation of the fandom and suggested that some of the questions asked by Harrison were meant to be "making fun" of "fannish questions".

== Bibliography ==
- Hurwitz, Matt; Knowles, Chris (2008). The Complete X-Files. Insight Editions. ISBN 978-1933784809.
- Kessenich, Tom (2002). Examination: An Unauthorized Look at Seasons 6–9 of the X-Files. Trafford Publishing. ISBN 1553698126.
- Shearman, Robert (2009). Wanting to Believe: A Critical Guide to The X-Files, Millennium & The Lone Gunmen. Mad Norwegian Press. ISBN 978-0975944691.
