= CENCO =

CENCO may refer to:

- Central Scientific Company
- Episcopal Conference of the Democratic Republic of the Congo, Conference Épiscopale Nationale du Congo
