= Christine Firkins =

Canadian actress

- Born: July 6, 1983 (age 42); Canada
- Occupation: Teacher

Christine Lynn Firkins (born July 6, 1983) is a Canadian teacher and former actress who starred in the 1997 film Speed 2: Cruise Control as Drew. She also made a guest appearance in The X-Files series as Thea Sprecher in the 8th season two-part premiere, "Within" and "Without". She is deaf and attended California State University, Northridge. She currently teaches American Sign Language.

== Filmography ==
Year	Title	Role	Notes
1997	Speed 2: Cruise Control	Drew	
2000	The X-Files	Thea Sprecher	2 episodes
