= Per Manum =

- The X-Files episode
- Episode no.: Season 8 Episode 13
- Directed by: Kim Manners
- Written by: Chris Carter; Frank Spotnitz
- Production code: 8ABX08
- Original air date: February 18, 2001
- Running time: 44 minutes

Guest appearances
- Jay Acovone as Duffy Haskell; Steven Anderson as Dr. James Parenti; Adam Baldwin as Knowle Rohrer; Diana Castle as Delivery Nurse; Elizabeth Cheap as Second Nurse; Megan Follows as Kath McCready; Victoria Gallegos as Receptionist; Jennifer Griffin as Dr. Miryum; Alexandra Margulies as Second Associate; David Purham as Dr. Lev; Mark Snow as Doctor; Christopher Stanley as Agent Joe Farah; Saxon Trainor as Mary Hendershot; Karl T. Wright as First Associate

Episode chronology
| ← Previous "Medusa" | Next → "This Is Not Happening" |
- The X-Files season 8

"Per Manum" is the thirteenth episode of the eighth season of the American science fiction television series The X-Files. It premiered on the Fox network on February 18, 2001. Written by Frank Spotnitz and series creator Chris Carter, and directed by Kim Manners, the episode helps to explore the series' overarching mythology. "Per Manum" received a Nielsen rating of 9.4 and was watched by 16.1 million viewers. Overall, the episode received mostly positive reviews from critics.

The series centers on FBI special agents Dana Scully (Gillian Anderson) and her new partner John Doggett (Robert Patrick)—following the alien abduction of her former partner, Fox Mulder (David Duchovny)—who work on cases linked to the paranormal, called X-Files. In this episode, Scully and Doggett investigate several women who had no way of naturally conceiving but who claim to have been abducted and impregnated with alien babies. Soon, Scully begins to worry about the future of her pregnancy.

"Per Manum" featured a substantial appearance by Duchovny who had elected not to return to the show as a full-time main character following the ending of season seven. In addition, the episode marks the first appearance of Knowle Rohrer, played by Adam Baldwin. The episode's title means "by hand" in Latin.

== Plot ==
Pregnant Kathy McCready is undergoing an emergency caesarean. As her husband prepares, the ward is locked down, and the child delivered is seen to be an alien.

FBI special agents John Doggett (Robert Patrick) and Dana Scully (Gillian Anderson) meet Duffy Haskell (Jay Acovone), who tells them about his wife—a multiple-abductee who he believes was killed by her doctors upon giving birth to an alien child. He also describes how his wife's cancer was both caused and cured by her abductors. Duffy refers the agents to Zeus Genetics in Maryland, and shows them an ultrasound scan that seems to vindicate his story. As the agents leave, Doggett notes similarities between the case and Scully's history, although he does not yet know that she is pregnant. In a flashback, Fox Mulder (David Duchovny) tells Scully that her abduction has rendered her infertile, as her ova were harvested for genetic experiments. Mulder later found them in a secret facility, but they were not viable.

At Zeus Genetics, Scully overhears a pregnant woman, Mary Hendershot (Saxon Trainor), who is telling her doctor that she no longer wants to be under his care. In order to avoid being seen, Scully hides in a storeroom, finding it full of preserved fetuses that resemble the alien child born earlier, but she is discovered by a Dr. Lev. Scully leaves and phones her Doctor, Dr. Parenti, who unbeknownst to Scully is dissecting an alien fetus, and asks him to compare her ultrasound scan with the one given to her earlier. Later, while waiting to be attended to by Parenti, she has another flashback, recalling the time she sought a second opinion about her ova from Parenti and was told that her ova might be viable with a sperm donor. In the present, she is called in to be attended to, and she is then assured her scans are in order. Later, Walter Skinner (Mitch Pileggi) and Doggett confront Duffy about threatening letters he has sent to both Mulder and Lev. However, when the agents leave, Duffy makes a phone call to Lev, warning him that they are being investigated. In another flashback, Scully asks Mulder to be the donor, to which he happily agrees.

Scully is warned by Mary that their unborn children are in danger. Scully meets Doggett and Skinner, having requested a leave of absence from the FBI. After Doggett leaves, Skinner tries to convince Scully to reveal her pregnancy to him but she does not. Scully and Mary visit an army research hospital to have Mary's labor induced. Whilst Mary is being prepped for the operation, Scully asks to have an ultrasound performed on herself. The scan appears normal, but afterwards Scully realizes the monitor they were watching was actually a video of another woman's scan. Realizing they have been tricked, Scully finds Mary and the two sneak out of the exam room.

Meanwhile Doggett discovers that Duffy's fingerprints belong to a man who died thirty years previously. Doggett contacts an old military partner, Knowle Rohrer (Adam Baldwin) to find his real identity. Although Rohrer assures Doggett he will investigate, the agent is not convinced, believing that Duffy is a CIA agent. Doggett confides this to Skinner, who tells him to aid Scully at the military hospital. As Scully and Mary sneak out of the building, they are found by Rohrer and several marines, claiming Doggett has sent them to rescue her. The women are driven away, but Mary enters labor and it becomes clear to Scully that Rohrer is not acting with good intentions. Scully is knocked out with drugs by Rohrer. When she wakens, Doggett informs her that Mary's baby was delivered and is normal. However, Scully is convinced the baby was swapped out, but nothing more can be done about it. In another flashback, Scully tells Mulder that her attempt at in vitro fertilization has failed, but he tells her to "never give up on a miracle".

== Production ==
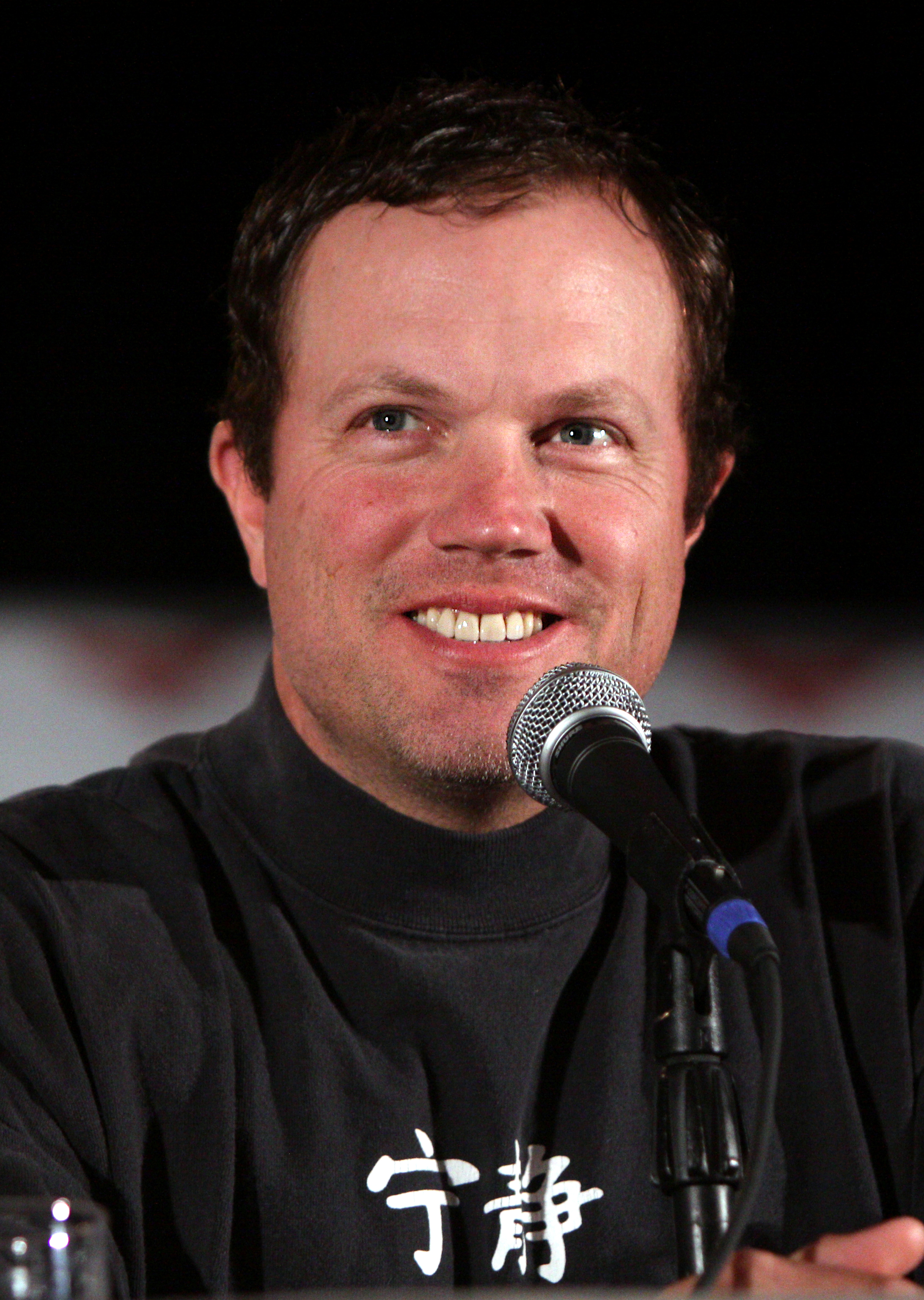
The episode featured the first appearance of Knowle Rohrer, played by Adam Baldwin.

"Per Manum" featured the appearance of David Duchovny as Fox Mulder in various flashbacks. After settling his contract dispute with Fox, Duchovny quit full-time participation in the show after the seventh season. In order to explain Mulder's absence, Duchovny's character was abducted by aliens in the seventh season finale, "Requiem". After several rounds of contractual discussions, Duchovny agreed to return for a total of 11 season eight episodes. "Per Manum" marked the fourth appearance of Duchovny in the eighth season; he had previously appeared in opening episodes of the season, "Within" and "Without" as well as the eleventh episode "The Gift". Series creator Chris Carter later argued that Mulder's absences from the series did not affect the series, noting that "there are characters who can be powerful as absent centers, as Mulder was through the eighth and ninth seasons."

A deleted scene from early on within the episode, in which Scully questions her doctor about her ultrasound scans, was cut from the final broadcast as writer Frank Spotnitz felt it was too "confusing" for the viewers to place doubt on the actions of the doctor so early. Fellow series writer John Shiban said that the scene was not "subtle" enough to convey the right level of suspicion. Spotnitz has described "Per Manum" as being "a real paranoia episode", concerning "the way you perceive connections between people, what are they saying, and is it suspicious or not".

Adam Baldwin, who makes his first appearance as recurring character Knowle Rohrer, originally auditioned for the part of John Doggett, losing out to Robert Patrick. However, the crew remembered Baldwin's audition later when casting "Per Manum", and asked him to play the role. Jay Acovone, who portrays Duffy Haskel in this episode, returned in the same role in the season's penultimate episode "Essence"; and had also previously appeared in the fourth season episode "Demons". "Per Manum" also featured a guest appearance by Mark Snow as an unnamed doctor. Snow had been the series' composer since the first season.

== Broadcast and reception ==
"Per Manum" premiered on the Fox network on February 18, 2001 and was first broadcast in the United Kingdom on BBC Two on June 9, 2002. The episode earned a Nielsen household rating of 9.4, meaning that it was seen by 9.4% of the nation's estimated households. It was seen by 16.1 million viewers, making it, at the time, the highest-rated episode of The X-Files to air during the season. "Per Manum" ranked as the 30th most-watched episode for the week ending February 18. The episode was later included on The X-Files Mythology, Volume 4 – Super Soldiers, a DVD collection that contains episodes involved with the alien super soldiers arc.

"Per Manum" received mostly positive reviews from critics. Emily St. James of The A.V. Club awarded the episode a "B+" and called it "good". She appreciated the fact that the show revealed that Mulder was possibly the father of Scully's child, saying that it "ups the stakes in a lot of ways and redefines [Scully's] mission" to find Mulder. Despite this, St. James noted that the episode "has some issues", largely due to the convoluted nature of the mythology at this point in the show's run, as well as the fact that Duchovny looked "a little bored" at times. However, she wrote that the episode, along with the subsequent episode "This is Not Happening" was a showcase for Anderson's acting ability, and her performance "knits all of this together".

Robert Shearman, in his book Wanting to Believe: A Critical Guide to The X-Files, Millennium & The Lone Gunmen, rated the episode five stars out of five, calling it a "return to form" for the series. Shearman also felt that the episode gave the character of John Doggett a chance to be accepted by the series' other characters. The author also praised the "subtle" writing of the episode's emotional dialogue. Tom Kessenich, in his book Examinations: An Unauthorized Look at Seasons 6-9 of 'The X-Files', noted that the episode typifies the basic themes of the series—"dark, foreboding terror, overriding sense of paranoia" and "the fear of the unknown" among others.

Writing for The Vindicator, Eric Mink felt that the episode was "intense, unsettling, sometimes gross, and suspenseful to the point of nerve-racking [sic]", feeling that its plot would "resonate instantly and ominously with viewers". Meghan Deans of Tor.com felt that, while the episode did unfortunately reduce Scully down to a traditional idea of feminine identity for part of its run, it was "one of the most emotional Scully-centric episodes the show has ever given us." Furthermore, Deans reasoned that the episode was an example of "what The X-Files would have been, had Scully been the believer: a woman being told that she is hysterical, a woman being told that she imagined it all [and] a woman being told that the evidence of her own body is invalid", a direction that would have been "startling ".

Not all reviews were positive. Paula Vitaris from Cinefantastique gave the episode a scathing review and awarded it no stars out of four. She heavily derided the plot, noting that Haskell's role as an "undercover operative" was not convincing. Furthermore, she reasoned that because the plot twists were so expected, Scully came off as "a moron". Vitaris also criticized the use of flashbacks, noting that they were "the only way The X-Files writers could figure out to use David Duchovny".

== Bibliography ==
- Hurwitz, Matt; Knowles, Chris (2008). The Complete X-Files. Insight Editions. ISBN 978-1-933784-80-9.
- Kessenich, Tom (2002). Examination: An Unauthorized Look at Seasons 6–9 of the X-Files. Trafford Publishing. ISBN 1-55369-812-6.
- Shearman, Robert (2009). Wanting to Believe: A Critical Guide to The X-Files, Millennium & The Lone Gunmen. Mad Norwegian Press. ISBN 978-0-9759446-9-1.
