= The X-Files season 8 =

Season of television series

The X-Files
- Season 8
- DVD cover
- Starring: David Duchovny; Gillian Anderson; Robert Patrick
- No. of episodes: 21

Release
- Original network: Fox
- Original release: November 5, 2000 – May 20, 2001

Season chronology
- ← Previous; Season 7 Next → Season 9

The eighth season of the American science fiction television series The X-Files commenced airing in the United States on November 5, 2000, concluded on May 20, 2001, and consisted of twenty-one episodes. Season eight takes place after Fox Mulder's (David Duchovny) alien abduction in the seventh season. The story arc for the search of Mulder continues until the second half of the season, while a new arc about Dana Scully's (Gillian Anderson) pregnancy is formed. This arc would continue, and end, with the next season. The season explores various themes such as life, death, and belief.

For this season, Duchovny elected to return only as an intermittent main character; he appears in twelve episodes, most of which take place in the second half of the season. Actor Robert Patrick was hired as a replacement for Mulder, playing John Doggett. The season also marked the first appearance of Annabeth Gish as Monica Reyes, who would become a main character in the ninth season. In addition to the cast change, series creator Chris Carter updated the opening credits, which had remained unchanged since the first season.

Season eight was received well by critics but was less warmly received by fans, many of whom were unhappy that Duchovny reduced his role and that Patrick took over as co-lead alongside Anderson. Ratings for the season were initially strong, but it eventually averaged a total of 13.53 million viewers, down from the seventh season's 14.2 million. Concurrent with the airing of this season, Carter and The X-Files production team created and aired a short-lived spinoff titled The Lone Gunmen.

== Plot overview ==
At the end of the seventh season finale, "Requiem", Fox Mulder (David Duchovny) was abducted by aliens. Dana Scully (Gillian Anderson) meets Special Agent John Doggett (Robert Patrick), the leader of an FBI taskforce organized to conduct a search for Mulder. Although the search ultimately proves unsuccessful, Doggett is assigned to the X-Files and works with Scully to look for explanations to several cases. When Scully learns that several women have reportedly been abducted and impregnated with alien babies, she begins to question her own pregnancy and fears for her unborn child.

Doggett introduces Scully to Special Agent Monica Reyes (Annabeth Gish), an FBI specialist in ritualistic crime, shortly before Mulder's deceased body suddenly appears in a forest at night. Following Mulder's funeral, Assistant Director Walter Skinner (Mitch Pileggi) is threatened by Alex Krycek (Nicholas Lea) that he must kill Scully's baby before it is born. Billy Miles (Zachary Ansley), a multiple abductee who disappeared on the same night as Mulder, is returned deceased but his dead body is resurrected and restored to full health. Mulder also returns from death, with Scully supervising his recovery. Fully rejuvenated, Mulder investigates several X-Files, against orders to do so, but soon gets fired, leaving Doggett in charge of the cases. Mulder continues to provide input in an unofficial capacity.

Reluctantly accepting Krycek's assistance, Mulder, Doggett and Skinner learn that an alien virus recently created in secret by members of the United States government has replaced several humans, including Miles and several high-ranking FBI personnel, with so-called alien "Super Soldiers". Krycek claims that the soldiers are virtually unstoppable aliens who want to make sure that humans will not survive the colonisation of Earth. They have learned that Scully's baby is a miraculously special child and are afraid that it may be greater than them. They have only recently learned of the baby's importance, which is why Krycek told Skinner to kill the unborn child earlier. When Miles arrives at the FBI Headquarters, Mulder, Doggett, Skinner and Krycek help Scully to escape along with Reyes, who drives her to a remote farm. Shortly after Skinner kills Krycek, Scully delivers an apparently normal baby, while the alien super soldiers surround her. Without explanation, the aliens leave the area as Mulder arrives. While Doggett and Reyes report to the FBI Headquarters, Mulder takes Scully and their newborn son, William, back to her apartment.

=== Themes ===
The eighth season of The X-Files takes place in a science fiction environment and employs the common science fiction concepts of strongly differentiated characters fighting an unequivocally evil enemy, in this case, the alien Colonists. The first episode of the season, "Within" explores "loss", "loneliness" and "pain" after the disappearance of Mulder. "Per Manum" included basic themes common in the series, such as "dark, foreboding terror", an "overriding sense of paranoia", and "the fear of the unknown", among others. Later on, death and resurrection emerged as a major sub-theme during the season, starting with "The Gift", wherein John Doggett is killed and resurrected, and later in "Deadalive" when Mulder is brought back to life after apparently being dead for three months. This sub-theme would continue well into the ninth season. The main story arc of the season dealt with the idea that, at times, humanity is a greater danger to itself. This theme is made manifest by the Syndicate and the human conspiracy with the aliens.

== Production ==
=== Development ===
The new opening sequence for season eight, featuring Robert Patrick, as well as images alluding to Scully's pregnancy (lower left) and Mulder's disappearance (lower right).

The series' original title sequence, crafted in 1993 during the show's first season had remained unchanged for seven seasons. With the partial loss of Duchovny after the seventh-season finale, the decision was made to update the credits, which were first featured in the premiere episode of season eight, "Within". The opening sequence now included new images, updated FBI badge photos for Duchovny and Anderson, and the addition of Patrick to the main cast. Duchovny's badge features in the opening credits only when he appears in an episode. The opening contains images of Scully's pregnancy and, according to Frank Spotnitz, shows an "abstract" explanation for Mulder's absence in this season, with him falling into an eye.

After the partial departure of Duchovny, Carter decided to focus almost solely on the character of Doggett during the first half of the season. This led to some unhappiness from the cast and critics, most notably Duchovny and Anderson. According to Tom Kessenich in his book Examinations, Anderson reportedly "wasn't thrilled" with the lack of attention her character was getting; instead, the writers were crafting episodes solely for Doggett because he was the show's new "voice". Duchovny, on the other hand, was unhappy because Mulder's abduction was never properly examined. Reportedly, Duchovny offered to write and direct an episode based around the concept of Mulder being trapped in the alien spaceship, as seen in the season opener "Within" and "Without". Carter, however, nixed the idea because "it was not about Doggett."

Frank Spotnitz recalled that he and Chris Carter were enthusiastic about the storytelling opportunities offered by the changing line-up, saying: "Suddenly it was this new toolbox, these new characters, these new actors, these new dynamics to play, and the storytelling really changed in those last two seasons and was really exciting for us to get to, to explore you know, your characters and the kinds of stories we could tell with you that we’d never could have or would have told with, with just Mulder and Scully in the show." He compared the tone to The Twilight Zone.

=== Casting ===
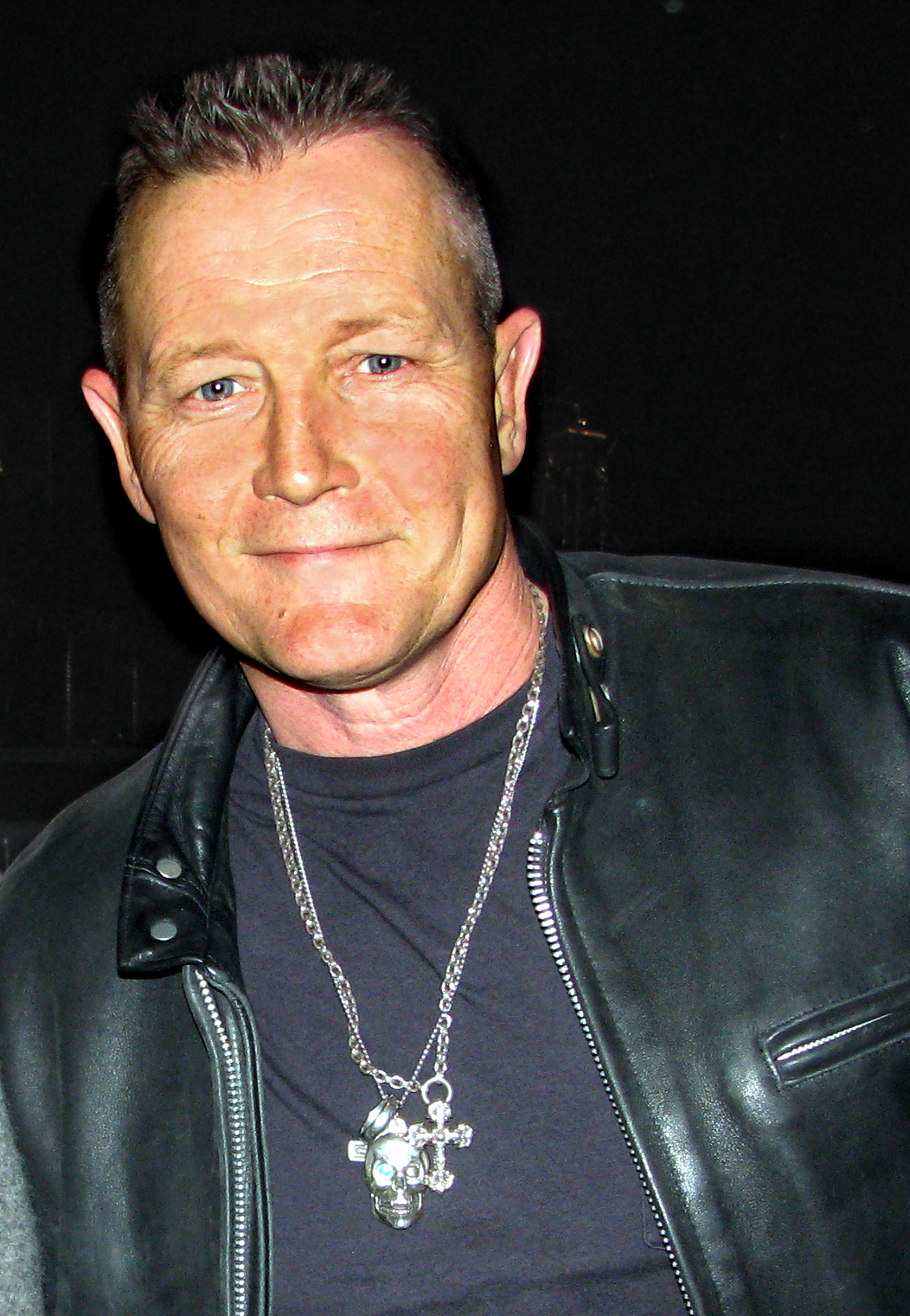
Robert Patrick played John Doggett on the show.

The show's seventh season was a time of closure for The X-Files. Characters within the show were written out—including Cigarette Smoking Man (William B. Davis) and Mulder's mother (Rebecca Toolan)—and several plot threads were resolved, including the fate of Fox Mulder's sister Samantha. Furthermore, after settling his contract dispute, Duchovny quit the show. This contributed to uncertainties over the likelihood of an eighth season. Carter and most fans felt the show was at its natural endpoint with Duchovny's departure, and Carter penned "Requiem", the finale episode of the seventh season, as a possible series finale. However, at the last minute, a new season was ordered and Duchovny agreed to star part-time, returning for 12 episodes instead of 21. Due to this change, the producers found it difficult to write Duchovny's character out of the script, but also eventually explain Mulder's absence if there were to be an upcoming season. Eventually, it was decided to have the character abducted by aliens.

Hoping to continue the series, Carter introduced a new central character to replace Mulder: John Doggett. More than 100 actors auditioned for the role, with only about ten considered by the producers. Lou Diamond Phillips and Hart Bochner were among the auditionees, and Phillips, Bochner and Bruce Campbell (who played Wayne Weinsider in a previous episode of The X-Files) were considered for the role, but the producers eventually choose Robert Patrick. The season also introduced Monica Reyes (portrayed by Annabeth Gish), who would become a main character in the following season.

=== Crew ===
Chris Carter, who served as executive producer and showrunner of the season, wrote or co-wrote nine of the 21 episodes, including the bulk of the season's mythology episodes. Of the nine, four were co-written with executive producer Frank Spotnitz and five were written solo. Spotnitz wrote four additional episodes on his own. The rest of the writing staff each contributed one or two episodes. Vince Gilligan was promoted to executive producer, John Shiban was promoted to co-executive producer, David Amann was promoted to producer, and Jeffrey Bell was promoted to executive story editor. Each wrote one episode. Steven Maeda was promoted to story editor and wrote two episodes. Daniel Arkin, who previously wrote an episode freelance, returned to contribute to the story for one episode.

Kim Manners was promoted to co-executive producer and directed seven of the episodes, the most of the season's directors. Others who directed multiple episodes included Tony Wharmby with four, Rod Hardy with three, and Richard Compton with two. Peter Markle, Terrence O'Hara, and Barry K. Thomas each directed one episode. Carter directed a single episode, while Spotnitz made his directorial debut.

== Cast ==
=== Main cast ===
==== Starring ====
- David Duchovny as Special Agent Fox Mulder (Note: Although appearing in only 12 episodes, Duchovny is credited as "starring" in the opening credits for the episodes in which he appears.)
- Gillian Anderson as Special Agent Dana Scully (Note: Anderson does not appear in "The Gift", except in archived footage.)
- Robert Patrick as Special Agent John Doggett

==== Also starring ====
- Mitch Pileggi as Walter Skinner
- Annabeth Gish as Monica Reyes
- Nicholas Lea as Alex Krycek

=== Recurring cast ===
- James Pickens, Jr. as Alvin Kersh
- Tom Braidwood as Melvin Frohike
- Bruce Harwood as John Fitzgerald Byers
- Dean Haglund as Richard Langly
- Kirk B. R. Woller as Agent Gene Crane
- Zachary Ansley as Billy Miles
- Adam Baldwin as Knowle Rohrer
- Sheila Larken as Margaret Scully

=== Guest cast ===
- Jeff Gulka as Gibson Praise
- Brian Thompson as Alien Bounty Hunter

== Episodes ==
Episodes marked with a double dagger (‡) are episodes in the series' Alien Mythology arc. (Note: All of these episodes were included on the DVD collections The X-Files Mythology, Volume 3 – Colonization and The X-Files Mythology, Volume 4 – Super Soldiers, released by Fox, with the exception of "The Gift". However, this episode is labelled as a mythology episode in the series' official guide book, The Complete X-Files: Behind the Series the Myths and the Movies, released in 2008.)

No. overall	No. in season	Title	Directed by	Written by	Original release date	Prod. code	U.S. viewers (millions)
162	1	"Within"‡	Kim Manners	Chris Carter	November 5, 2000	8ABX01	15.87
An FBI taskforce is organized to hunt for Fox Mulder but Dana Scully suspects the taskforce leader, Special Agent John Doggett, and instead chooses to search for her lost partner with Walter Skinner.
163	2	"Without"‡	Kim Manners	Chris Carter	November 12, 2000	8ABX02	15.15
At a remote school in the Arizona desert, Doggett, Scully, Gibson and Skinner – as well as a host of students and agents – do not know whom to trust as the bounty hunter works among them; and – in a spaceship close by – Mulder is experimented on.
164	3	"Patience"	Chris Carter	Chris Carter	November 19, 2000	8ABX04	13.34
Having been assigned to the X-Files, John Doggett joins Scully to investigate a series of gruesome killings that appear to be the work of a bat-like creature. This being their first case together, Scully and Doggett find that their investigative techniques are less than similar.
165	4	"Roadrunners"	Rod Hardy	Vince Gilligan	November 26, 2000	8ABX05	13.60
Working alone, Scully pursues a cult that worship a slug-like organism; but in her efforts to save an injured stranger, she discovers she's in over her head.
166	5	"Invocation"	Richard Compton	David Amann	December 3, 2000	8ABX06	13.89
Having been kidnapped for ten years, a little boy mysteriously reappears but has not aged one bit. While the case stirs up painful memories for Doggett, suspicion stirs that the boy is not all he seems.
167	6	"Redrum"	Peter Markle	Story by : Steven Maeda & Daniel Arkin; Teleplay by : Steven Maeda	December 10, 2000	8ABX03	13.21
After his wife is murdered, a lawyer friend of Doggett's tries to clear his name of the crime but the days regress backwards.
168	7	"Via Negativa"	Tony Wharmby	Frank Spotnitz	December 17, 2000	8ABX07	12.37
Doggett and Skinner work to avert the murderous spree of a religious cult leader, while Scully takes time off to deal with the early stages of her pregnancy.
169	8	"Surekill"	Terrence O'Hara	Greg Walker	January 7, 2001	8ABX09	13.33
The fatal shooting of a realtor while alone in a cinderblock jail cell has Doggett hoping motive will yield more than method, but they soon learn that there is more to this case than meets the eye.
170	9	"Salvage"	Rod Hardy	Jeffrey Bell	January 14, 2001	8ABX10	11.69
Doggett and Scully encounter a dead man who is still living – only somewhat changed. What they discover is a man made of metal, enacting vengeance on those he believes created him.
171	10	"Badlaa"	Tony Wharmby	John Shiban	January 21, 2001	8ABX12	11.87
When a mystic smuggles himself out of India, Scully and Doggett give chase as his murderous spree starts terrorizing two families in suburban Washington, D.C. But Scully soon comes upon a crisis of faith when she realizes how dissimilar her techniques are from Mulder, even as she tries to be the believer.
172	11	"The Gift"‡	Kim Manners	Frank Spotnitz	February 4, 2001	8ABX11	14.58
Doggett comes upon an old case about a professed 'soul-eater' that Mulder kept secret from Scully, which he hopes will ultimately prove the truth behind Mulder's abduction.
173	12	"Medusa"	Richard Compton	Frank Spotnitz	February 11, 2001	8ABX13	13.75
A string of bizarre deaths in the tunnels of the Boston subway system sees Doggett join a team of professionals underground to investigate. Meanwhile, Scully has to defy the train authorities above land, who are determined to get the trains up and running within hours.
174	13	"Per Manum"‡	Kim Manners	Chris Carter & Frank Spotnitz	February 18, 2001	8ABX08	16.10
Scully becomes personally involved when she encounters several women who had no way of naturally conceiving but who claim to have been abducted and impregnated with alien babies.
175	14	"This Is Not Happening"‡	Kim Manners	Chris Carter & Frank Spotnitz	February 25, 2001	8ABX14	16.87
Doggett calls on another agent, Monica Reyes, to assist in the Mulder case, but Scully's fears about finding him come to a head with the sudden recovery of abductees seized at the same time.
176	15	"Deadalive"‡	Tony Wharmby	Chris Carter & Frank Spotnitz	April 1, 2001	8ABX15	12.57
Three months after Mulder's funeral, a former abductee awakens from the dead and Scully pins her hopes on resurrecting her partner. Meanwhile, Alex Krycek offers Skinner a loathsome deal which he claims can save Mulder's life.
177	16	"Three Words"‡	Tony Wharmby	Chris Carter & Frank Spotnitz	April 8, 2001	8ABX18	10.46
Mulder secretly conducts his own investigation after a man is gunned down on the White House lawn attempting to inform the President of a planned alien invasion. However, he is soon in over his head as he tries to expose further evidence of colonization.
178	17	"Empedocles"	Barry K. Thomas	Greg Walker	April 22, 2001	8ABX17	12.46
Reyes enlists Mulder's help investigating a killer's connection to the unsolved homicide of Doggett's son but Mulder soon finds himself clashing with Doggett.
179	18	"Vienen"‡	Rod Hardy	Steven Maeda	April 29, 2001	8ABX16	11.81
Mulder and Doggett are asked to investigate several deaths aboard an oil rig, but Mulder is convinced the rig is carrying an alien black oil; meanwhile a heavily pregnant Scully attempts to protect Mulder in absentia.
180	19	"Alone"	Frank Spotnitz	Frank Spotnitz	May 6, 2001	8ABX19	12.71
With Scully on maternity leave, Doggett is paired with an enthusiastic young agent named Layla Harrison who knows everything about the X-Files, and her apotheosis of Mulder and Scully leads to him learning a thing or two. But when Harrison and Doggett disappear, Mulder defies orders in an attempt to find them.
181	20	"Essence"‡	Kim Manners	Chris Carter	May 13, 2001	8ABX20	12.75
Mulder, Skinner and Doggett come up against the horrible consequences of the Syndicate's pact with the aliens, as a hybrid attempts to erase all evidence of the tests – including Scully's soon-to-be-born baby. The men call on Reyes, and – reluctantly – Alex Krycek to help them.
182	21	"Existence"‡	Kim Manners	Chris Carter	May 20, 2001	8ABX21	14.01
Mulder, Doggett and Skinner face off with the alien replicants as they desperately try to expose the conspiracy within the FBI. Meanwhile, Scully goes into labor in a remote location, but Reyes soon learns they may be no safer there.

== Reception ==
=== Ratings ===
Reportedly, Patrick was cast due to the hopes that his featured role in Terminator 2: Judgment Day (1991) would attract a greater share of the 18- to 35-year-old male demographic to the show. Early on, Fox executives reported a 10 percent overall increase in the demographic, solely due to Patrick's casting. "Within", the season's first episode, earned a Nielsen household rating of 9.5, meaning that it was seen by 9.5% of the nation's estimated households. The episode was viewed by 15.87 million viewers, which marked an 11% decrease from the seventh season opener, "The Sixth Extinction." The highest-rated episode of the season was "This is Not Happening", which was viewed by 16.9 million viewers, making it the most-watched episode of the series, in terms of viewers, since "The Sixth Extinction". The season finale, "Existence", earned a Nielsen household rating of 8.4, meaning that it was seen by 8.4% of the nation's estimated households. The episode was watched by 14 million viewers, overall. The nine episodes of the season that did not feature Mulder averaged only 13 million viewers, whereas the twelve episodes that did feature Mulder averaged 13.93 million viewers, almost a difference of one million. The season averaged a total of 13.53 million viewers, down from the seventh season's 14.2 million.

During 2000, companies were paying Fox $225,000 for every 30-second spot that would air between acts of The X-Files. Many Information technology (IT) companies were buying commercials during the show, largely due to the fact that "many ['coders IT geeks'] get their weekly fix of science fiction from this prime-time show."

=== Reviews ===
The show's eighth season received mixed to positive reviews from critics. The A.V. Club noted that the first eight seasons of The X-Files were "good-to-great", and that the eighth season of the show was "revitalized by the new 'search for Mulder' story-arc." John C. Snider of SciFiDimensions gave the season a favorable review, calling it "great" and describing its episodes as "pretty strong". Collin Polonowonski of DVD Times said that the season included "more hits than misses overall" but was throughout negative about the mythology episodes claiming them to be the "weakest" episodes in the season. Many critics eventually accepted Doggett's character. Anita Gates of The New York Times said that most fans had "accepted" the introduction of the character and further stated that he actually looked "Like a Secret Service Agent." Carter commented on the character, saying "Everybody likes Robert Patrick and the character", but further stating that the fans "miss" Duchovny's character, Mulder. Dave Golder of SFX called Patrick "superb" and noted that his entrance in the series "inject[ed] a sense of pragmatism and good old-fashioned plain-speaking in to the show which we didn't realise was missing until we got it." Entertainment Weekly reviewer Ken Tucker said that Patrick's portrayal of Doggett was "hardboiled alertness", giving mostly positive reviews about his inclusion. Cynthia Littleton of The Hollywood Reporter described the season as the show's "swan song".

Not all reviews were positive. Jesse Hassenger from PopMatters gave a negative review to the season, claiming that Patrick was mis-cast and calling David Duchovny's appearances as Fox Mulder shallow. Golder criticized the season for "recycling plots with gusto" and for featuring Mulder falling into Scully's eye in the opening credits, noting that it "gives Duchovny too much of a lingering presence on the show, reinforcing prejudices against Patrick as some kind of 'imposter'."

=== Accolades ===
"This Is Not Happening" was nominated for an American Society of Cinematographers award for cinematography. Robert Patrick won a Saturn Award in the category "Best Television Actor" in 2001 for his role as Doggett, that year Gillian Anderson was nominated in the category "Best Actress on Television" and the series itself was nominated in the category "Best Network Television Series" in the Saturn Awards, but failed to win. Anderson was nominated for a Screen Actors Guild award the very same year in the category "Outstanding Performance by a Female Actor in a Drama Series". The X-Files won its last Emmy Award with "Deadalive", and Bill Roe received a nomination for "Outstanding Cinematography for a Single-Camera Series".

== DVD release ==
The X-Files – The Complete Eighth Season
Set details		Special features
21 episodes; 6-disc set; 1.78:1 aspect ratio; Subtitles: English, Spanish; English (Dolby 2.0 Surround)		"The Truth About Season Eight" Documentary; DVD-ROM game; Audio Commentaries (Dolby Digital 2.0 Stereo); "Alone" – Frank Spotnitz; "Existence" – Kim Manners; Selected special effects clips; Deleted scenes; Character profiles; 42 promotional television spots
Release dates
Region 1	Region 2	Region 4
November 4, 2003	March 14, 2004	April 14, 2004

== Bibliography ==
- Kellner, Douglas (2003). Media Spectacle. Routledge. ISBN 0-415-26828-1.
- Kessenich, Tom (2002). Examination: An Unauthorized Look at Seasons 6–9 of the X-Files. Trafford Publishing. ISBN 1-55369-812-6.
- Shapiro, Marc (2000). All Things: The Official Guide to the X-Files Volume 6. Harper Prism. ISBN 0-06-107611-2.
