= Without (The X-Files) =

- The X-Files episode
- Fox Mulder is abducted and experimented upon by Colonists. Mulder's abduction was written in to the show as a way to explain Duchovny's partial departure from production.
- Episode no.: Season 8 Episode 2
- Directed by: Kim Manners
- Written by: Chris Carter
- Production code: 8ABX02
- Original air date: November 12, 2000
- Running time: 44 minutes

Guest appearances
- Mitch Pileggi as Walter Skinner; James Pickens, Jr. as Alvin Kersh; Brian Thompson as Alien Bounty Hunter; Kirk B. R. Woller as Gene Crane; Jeff Gulka as Gibson Praise; Jo-Ann Dean as Secretary; Christine Firkins as Thea Sprecher; Marc Gomes as Danny Mosley; Sal Landi as Landau; Arlene Malinowski as Teacher; Jonathan Palmer as Principal

Episode chronology
← Previous "Within"	Next → "Patience"
- The X-Files season 8

"Without" is the second episode of the eighth season of the science fiction television series The X-Files. The episode first aired in the United States and Canada on November 12, 2000, on Fox and subsequently aired in the United Kingdom on February 18, 2001. It was written by executive producer Chris Carter and directed by Kim Manners. The episode helps to explore the series' overarching mythology and continues from the seventh season finale, "Requiem", and season eight premiere, "Within", in which Fox Mulder was abducted by aliens who are planning to colonize Earth. The episode earned a Nielsen rating of 9.0 in the United States and was seen by 15.1 million viewers. As with the previous episode, "Within," it was generally well-received by critics, although some detractors criticized various plot points.

The show centers on FBI special agents Fox Mulder (David Duchovny) and Dana Scully (Gillian Anderson) who work on cases linked to the paranormal, called X-Files. In the episode, John Doggett (Robert Patrick) continues his search for Mulder, and attempts to uncover an alien bounty hunter within their ranks. After the task force is called off, Scully is surprised to learn that Doggett, the leader of the team, has been assigned to the X-Files.

"Without" featured scenes of Mulder imprisoned on an alien spaceship and new sets were created for this unique locale. The production crew of The X-Files designed the set in a decidedly "low-tech" and "interesting" manner. In addition, unusual filming techniques were used, such as motion control, in order to achieve the desired footage.

== Plot ==
=== Background ===
FBI special agent Fox Mulder (David Duchovny) is currently missing, having been abducted by aliens in the seventh season finale, "Requiem." His partner Dana Scully (Gillian Anderson) has been working with Agent John Doggett (Robert Patrick) in order to locate him. After consulting with The Lone Gunmen, a trio of conspiracy theorists made up of John Byers (Bruce Harwood), Melvin Frohike (Tom Braidwood) and Richard Langly (Dean Haglund), Scully finds evidence that Mulder may be in Arizona. Doggett receives news that Gibson Praise (Jeff Gulka), a boy with potentially extraterrestrial DNA, may be in hiding in Arizona as well. The two, along with Walter Skinner (Mitch Pileggi) and a task force of FBI agents arrive and, after searching, find Mulder and Praise on the corner of a mountain.

=== Events ===
Doggett pursues Mulder and Praise and corners them at the edge of a cliff. Doggett convinces Mulder to release Praise who runs off alone, but Mulder intentionally steps off the precipice and apparently falls to his death. When agents go to retrieve the body, they only find footprints. Scully realizes "Mulder" was an Alien Bounty Hunter sent to retrieve Praise.

While the Alien Bounty Hunter returns to the school to continue his search for Praise, Scully follows Praise's schoolmate, a deaf girl named Thea (Christine Firkins), through the desert to a hidden underground room. Praise has broken his leg reaching the hiding place. Scully applies first aid, but is unable to move him without a car.

After Doggett explains the events on the cliff to Alvin Kersh, Skinner tells him that Kersh is setting him up to fail. Shortly afterwards, the Alien Bounty Hunter (now disguised as Scully) attacks Agent Landau. Skinner and the real Scully eventually manage to drive the alien away. Later, Skinner gets Praise to a hospital, but leaves Scully behind in the desert.

Searching for Mulder in the desert, Scully sees a bright light in the sky which is revealed to be a helicopter with Doggett inside. Doggett insists Scully travel with him to the hospital; she reluctantly accepts. There, two other FBI agents assure them that nothing has happened to Praise; however, they soon discover that he has vanished. Scully leaves to search for Praise while Doggett stays in an attempt to catch the intruder. He checks the ceiling space, where he finds Skinner badly injured. Scully finds Praise with "Skinner" who claims to be protecting the boy. The Alien Bounty Hunter attempts to kill her, but Scully shoots and kills him first.

After reporting to Kersh, Doggett is assigned to the X-Files with Scully. Meanwhile, Mulder continues to be held in captivity, experimented on and tortured as six Bounty Hunters look on.

== Production ==
After David Duchovny fulfilled his contractual obligations with the show's seventh season, he felt that there was not much else to do with the character. Fox Mulder's abduction was thus devised by Chris Carter in the seventh-season finale "Requiem" as a way of allowing the actor to leave the series.

A concept sketch of the alien surgical chair, as seen in Mulder's experimentation scenes.

Several of the scenes in "Without" take place onboard an alien spaceship in which Mulder is being imprisoned. When designing the interior look of the ship, production designer Cory Kaplan was attracted to a primitive aesthetic, noting in an interview: "We all see super-tech [in spaceships] now, but the idea of low-tech was much more interesting to me, much more visual. So, you take elements of rock and steel and chisel them into interesting shapes." Kaplan's task was aided by the discovery of backdrop from the film Alien (1979), which she and director of photography Bill Roe "lit ... very dimly and put ... behind" the chair in which Mulder is restrained. According to Kaplan, this chair was "just this rotating platform with this humongous dental piece that could rotate around".

Most of the shots of Mulder being tortured in the chair were created using special and practical effects, as well as creative camera techniques. For the scene in which Mulder's face is restrained by hooks, make-up artist Matthew W. Mungle, who created special cheek prosthetics that were then attached to Duchovny (whom series makeup supervisor Cheri Montasanto-Medcalf later noted "sat pretty good through all that").

The shot at the end of the episode, in which multiple Alien Bounty Hunters surround Mulder as he is restrained in a surgical chair, required the use of motion control, a method in which a motion-control camera on a computerized module is repeatedly run through the same motion while elements are continually added. According to Wash, this was one of the few times that the series employed motion control, which made it more challenging to shoot. To create the effect, the camera first filmed a pass over the empty set. The production crew then filmed five additional passes, each one with the Alien Bounty Hunter in a different location. By compositing all the shots together, the production crew was able to "clone" the Bounty Hunter and have him appear in multiple places at once.

== Reception ==
"Without" premiered on American television on November 12, 2000, on Fox. The episode earned a Nielsen household rating of 9.0 (meaning that it was seen by 9.0% of the nation's estimated households), and was watched by 15.1 million viewers. The episode was later included on The X-Files Mythology, Volume 3 – Colonization, a DVD collection that contains episodes involved with the alien Colonist's plans to take over the earth.

The episode was met with relatively positive reviews from critics. Robert Shearman, in his book Wanting to Believe: A Critical Guide to The X-Files, Millennium & The Lone Gunmen, rated the episode five stars out of five. The author praised the episode's plot, citing the abduction and search for Mulder as components to the arc's "brilliance". Shearman noted that the final scene, featuring Mulder surrounded by the alien bounty hunter was created with "beauty, emotion, and horror which in collision make The X-Files one of the best shows on TV." Zack Handlen of The A.V. Club wrote that both "Without" and "Within" form "a great way to pick up after the cliffhanger ending of the previous season" and that "the pair of episodes [...] work well as an introduction to the new narrative status quo." He awarded both entries a "B+" but noted, however, that "Without" nearly came across as "strained or stalling", but "manages to get by with the general freakiness of the alien bounty hunter".

Ken Tucker from Entertainment Weekly was positive towards both this episode and the season premiere, "Within," awarding the episodes an "A−". George Avalos and Michael Liedtke from the Contra Costa Times praised the episode and noted that the Scully/Doggett dynamic and the hunt for Fox Mulder worked towards the show's strengths. Tom Janulewicz from Space.com positively commented on Scully's conversion from skeptic to believer, writing, "Regardless of whether it's aliens, flukemen, or pizza delivering vampires, The X-Files is all about phenomena that don't stand in the face of 'rational' explanations. It took her a long time, but like Mulder before her, Scully eventually came to accept that there are more things in heaven and earth than are dreamt of in her philosophy."

Not all reviews were positive. Paula Vitaris from Cinefantastique gave the episode a more mixed review and awarded it two stars out of four. Vitaris criticized both Scully becoming the believer as well as the "sky turning out to be a helicopter gimmick", which she notes "has gotten way too old." Tom Kessenich, in his book Examinations wrote a relatively negative review of the episode. He noted, "All ['Without'] did was remind me why the show is a hollow shell of what it once was as long as Fox Mulder is strapped to an alien table and why The Doggett and Pony Show holds absolutely no appeal to me whatsoever."

== Bibliography ==
- Hurwitz, Matt; Knowles, Chris (2008). The Complete X-Files. Insight Editions. ISBN 978-1933784809.
- Kessenich, Tom (2002). Examination: An Unauthorized Look at Seasons 6–9 of the X-Files. Trafford Publishing. ISBN 1553698126.
- Shearman, Robert (2009). Wanting to Believe: A Critical Guide to The X-Files, Millennium & The Lone Gunmen. Mad Norwegian Press. ISBN 978-0975944691.
