= This Is Not Happening (The X-Files) =

- The X-Files episode
- Fox Mulder is returned to Earth, deceased. The episode, featuring the return of David Duchovny, was praised by critics.
- Episode no.: Season 8 Episode 14
- Directed by: Kim Manners
- Written by: Chris Carter; Frank Spotnitz
- Production code: 8ABX14
- Original air date: February 25, 2001
- Running time: 44 minutes

Guest appearances
- Annabeth Gish as Monica Reyes; Mitch Pileggi as Walter Skinner; Sarah Koskoff as Theresa Hoese; John McGonegle as Uniformed Officer; Arlene Pileggi as Skinner's Assistant; Randy Ross as Nike Man; Judson Scott as Absalom; Roy Thinnes as Jeremiah Smith; Eddie Kaye Thomas as Gary Cory; Judd Trichter as Richie Szalay; Bernard White as Dr. Desai; Roz Witt as Night Nurse

Episode chronology
← Previous "Per Manum"	Next → "Deadalive"
- The X-Files season 8

"This Is Not Happening" is the fourteenth episode of the eighth season and the 175th episode overall of the science fiction television series The X-Files. The episode first aired in the United States on February 25, 2001, on the Fox Network, and subsequently aired in the United Kingdom. It was written by executive producers Chris Carter and Frank Spotnitz, and directed by Kim Manners, and forms part of the series' overarching mythology. The episode received a Nielsen household rating of 9.7 and was watched by 16.9 million viewers, making it the highest-rated episode of the season. "This Is Not Happening" was received positively by television critics.

The series centers on FBI special agents Dana Scully (Gillian Anderson) and her new partner John Doggett (Robert Patrick)—following the alien abduction of her former partner, Fox Mulder (David Duchovny)—who work on cases linked to the paranormal, called X-Files. In this episode, Scully, Doggett, and Walter Skinner (Mitch Pileggi) discover several returned alien abductees. Doggett calls on another agent, Monica Reyes (Annabeth Gish), to assist the case. Scully's fears about finding Mulder come to a head with the sudden recovery of one of the abductees seized at the same time.

"This Is Not Happening" was a story milestone for the season, returning Mulder from his alien abduction which started with "Requiem". In addition, the episode introduced the character Monica Reyes (Annabeth Gish), who would become a main character in season nine. Gish's character was introduced as a possible replacement for Anderson, who was considering leaving the series after the end of the season.

== Plot ==
In Helena, Montana, Richie Szalay is chasing a UFO. As the UFO stops, it dumps a naked woman and cloaks itself. The woman is later revealed to be Theresa Hoese, who was abducted at the same time as Fox Mulder (David Duchovny). Walter Skinner (Mitch Pileggi), John Doggett (Robert Patrick) and Dana Scully (Gillian Anderson) visit Theresa in the hospital to get information about Mulder's whereabouts.

Later in a motel, the agents interrogate Richie, whose friend Gary had been abducted just before Mulder; he was investigating UFO reports in Montana in an attempt to find him. Doggett reports that fresh footprints from Nike shoes were noted in the area Theresa was found, making Doggett skeptical about Richie's claims. Meanwhile, Jeremiah Smith has assumed the form of a doctor and arranges for Theresa to be transferred. Having learned of Theresa's disappearance, Doggett calls Agent Monica Reyes (Annabeth Gish). Reyes assists in the investigation, believing that Mulder may have joined a UFO cult. In a derelict compound, Smith cures Theresa of her injuries, as observed by a man called Absalom.

Reyes' car stalls just before she sees a UFO. Stopping, she sees Smith and Absalom taking a body; she also finds Gary's body. Reyes is able to retrieve the license plate number on the truck used to kidnap the abductee. It is later revealed that it belongs to Absalom, real name Travis Clayton Moberly, the leader of a doomsday cult. The FBI storms the cult's compound and arrests Absalom, but Smith is not found. Absalom tells Scully and Doggett that he has been saving abductees who had been left for dead by the aliens. Examining video of the compound raid, Scully, Reyes and Doggett watch Smith step through a doorway and transform into Doggett. Doggett is stunned, and the agents realize that Smith is still in the compound.

Scully runs into the compound and, identifying Smith by his Nike shoes, tells him she knows who he is and what he's doing. She is distracted when Skinner tells her they've found Mulder's body in the woods. Scully sees Mulder's lifeless body and races back to the compound hoping that Smith can heal him, but a UFO directs a beam of light into the room where he is being held; when she enters the room, he is gone. Distraught, Scully yells, "This is not happening!", and weeps.

== Production ==
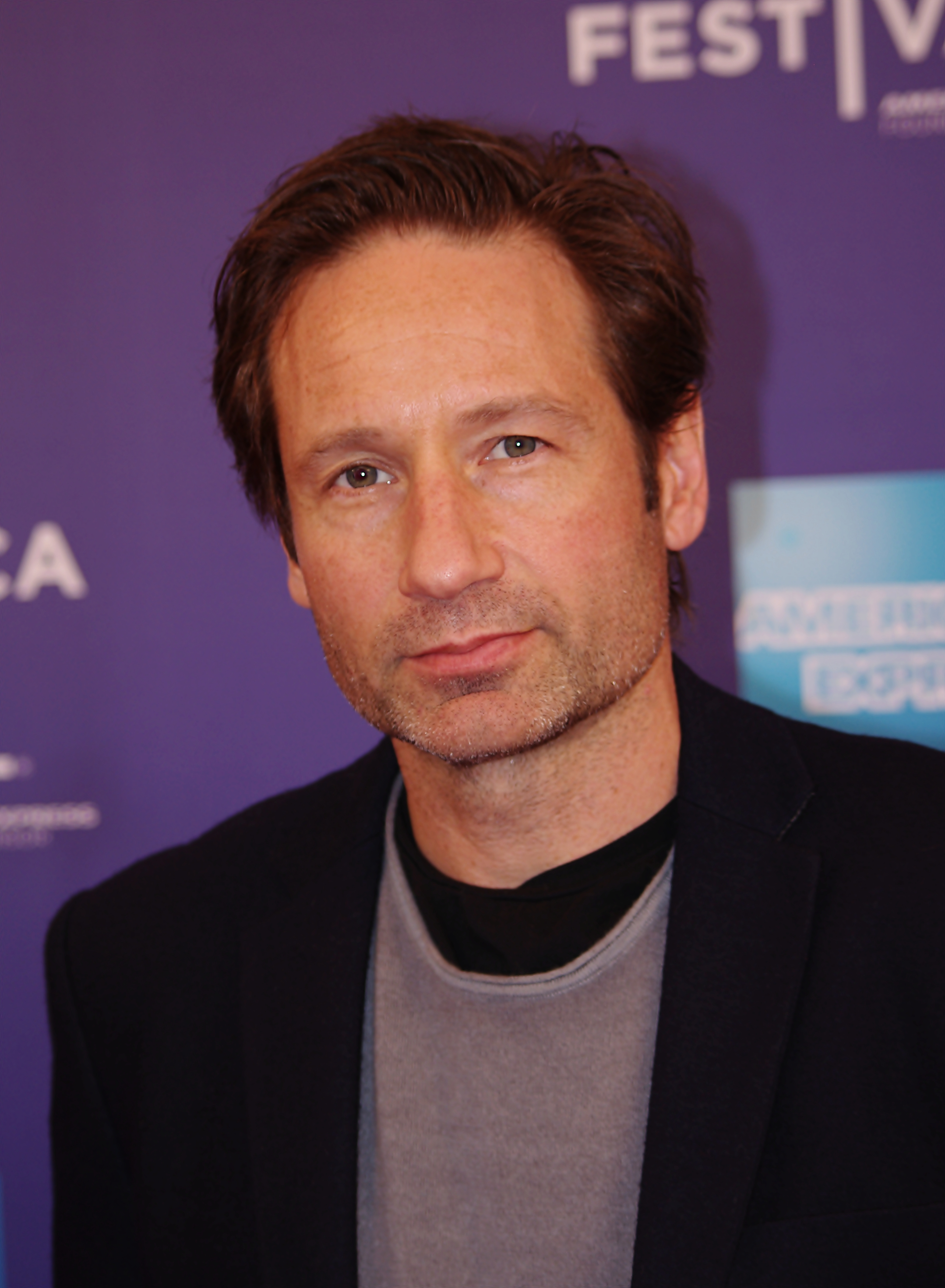
"This Is Not Happening" featured the return of David Duchovny as Fox Mulder.

=== Background and effects ===
"This Is Not Happening" marked the narrative return of David Duchovny as Fox Mulder. After settling his contract dispute with Fox, Duchovny had quit full-time participation in the show after the seventh season. In order to explain Mulder's absence, Duchovny's character was abducted by aliens in the seventh season finale, "Requiem." After several rounds of contractual discussions, Duchovny agreed to return for a total of 11 season eight episodes. "This Is Not Happening" marked the fifth appearance of Duchovny in the eighth season: his character had appeared in cameos in "Within" and "Without", as well as in flashbacks in "The Gift" and "Per Manum."

The opening scene required the crew of The X-Files to create a UFO chase. In order to do this, the scene was filmed entirely in a mountainous area that was lit up to give the shot a more alien-like feel. The UFO seen flying at the opening of the scene was actually a helicopter, disguised using various techniques. A so-called "cloaking-effect", created on a computer and consisting mostly of digital fog and "wiggled lights", was used to make the "spaceship" appear and then suddenly disappear.

=== Casting ===
This episode marked the first appearance of Monica Reyes, played by Annabeth Gish, who would become a main character in season nine. The character was developed and introduced due to Gillian Anderson's possible departure at the end of the eighth season. Although Anderson ultimately remained through the ninth season, Gish was also retained and became a series regular. When creating the character, series creator Chris Carter wanted to create a character who had much in common with both Fox Mulder and Dana Scully. However, Carter also wanted the character to be different from Scully's character in a way that Doggett was different from Mulder, saying, "as much as Robert Patrick was unlike Mulder, we needed someone who was equally unlike Scully." Gish later noted that, "Chris really wanted Monica to be a sunny force, which is hard to play sometimes. But it's a natural instinct for me; I can find happiness in the midst of darkness."

The casting process for Monica Reyes was unconventional. Gish received a call from her agent, who informed her that The X-Files was looking for a new female character. Gish applied for the part, but instead of having to a do a reading, she only had to meet with Chris Carter and Frank Spotnitz. After receiving the part, Gish's first scene, which was scheduled for four in the morning, involved her running down a hill to discover a former abductee.

== Reception ==
"This Is Not Happening" premiered on February 25, 2001, on American television on Fox. The episode earned a Nielsen household rating of 9.7, meaning that it was seen by 9.7% of the nation's estimated households. It was watched by 16.9 million viewers, making it the highest-rated episode of the season, as well as the highest-rated episode of the series since the seventh season episode "The Sixth Extinction". The episode was nominated for a Primetime Emmy for Outstanding Cinematography for a Single-Camera Series. The episode was later included on The X-Files Mythology, Volume 4 – Super Soldiers, a DVD collection that contains episodes involved with the alien super soldiers arc.

Critical reception to "This Is Not Happening" was mostly positive. Emily St. James Club awarded the episode an "A−" and called it "one of the strongest episodes of the season, give or take a Monica Reyes." She applauded the reintroduction of Jeremiah Smith—a character she felt "the show had mostly forgotten about"—and wrote highly of Scott as Absalom, calling him a "one of the episode's highlights." St. James also wrote that the episode, along with the previous episode "Per Manum" was a showcase for Anderson's acting ability. Robert Shearman, in his book Wanting to Believe: A Critical Guide to The X-Files, Millennium & The Lone Gunmen, rated the episode five stars out of five. The author noted, and praised, that the true tragedy of the episode is the fact that, despite her increased role as the reluctant believer, the way Scully deals with Absalom and Jeremiah Smith "in a strictly scientific way", instead of taking the "leap of faith", prevents her from finding and saving Mulder in time.

Not all reviews were positive. Paula Vitaris from Cinefantastique gave the episode a negative review and awarded it one-and-a-half stars out of four. She called the episode "unexciting" and concluded that the final scene was "anticlimactic". In addition, Vitaris noted that the introduction of Monica Reyes was not satisfactorily explained.

== Bibliography ==
- Hurwitz, Matt; Knowles, Chris (2008). The Complete X-Files. Insight Editions. ISBN 978-1-933784-80-9.
- Shapiro, Marc (2000). All Things: The Official Guide to the X-Files Volume 6. Harper Prism. ISBN 0-06-107611-2.
- Shearman, Robert (2009). Wanting to Believe: A Critical Guide to The X-Files, Millennium & The Lone Gunmen. Mad Norwegian Press. ISBN 978-0-9759446-9-1.
