= Central Scientific Company =

- Industry: Scientific educational equipment
- Predecessor: Olmstad Scientific Company
- Founded: Chicago, Illinois, United States (1900; 125 years ago)
- Defunct: 2000
- Successor: Sargent-Welch
- Headquarters: United States
- Products: Science teaching equipment

Central Scientific Company was founded in 1900 in downtown Chicago. It was formed out of what was left of the Olmstad Scientific Company.

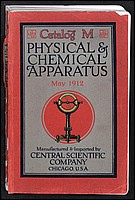
Catalog cover

Central Scientific manufactured and distributed science teaching equipment for schools, colleges, and universities by catalog mail order. The trademark CENCO was used from 1909 onwards. CENCO dominated the field of selling science education equipment through their mail order catalog.

By 1935, the company established itself as one of the leading national suppliers of science equipment. During World War II, part of the manufacturing facility was turned over to the production of war necessities, making bombsights for airplanes and fuses for large bombs.

After 1968, the company began having financial difficulties. In 1974, the assets were sold off to competitors. The educational business retained the name Central Scientific Company.

In April 1979, Central Scientific's assets and activities were acquired by two businessmen from Buffalo, New York. Sargent-Welch (a major competitor) bought them out in 2000.

== See also ==
- VWR International
