= Alvin Kersh =

Fictional character in X-Files series

- The X-Files character
- James Pickens Jr. as Alvin Kersh
- First appearance: "The Beginning"
- Portrayed by: James Pickens Jr.

In-universe information
- Occupation: Deputy Director of the Federal Bureau of Investigation
- Affiliated with: The Smoking Man; Toothpick Man
- Duration: 1998–2002, 2018

Alvin D. Kersh is a fictional character in the Fox science fiction television series The X-Files, played by James Pickens Jr. He serves as a figure of authority within the series, first introduced as an Assistant Director of the Federal Bureau of Investigation, and is later promoted to the post of Deputy Director. Kersh acts as an antagonist who bureaucratically prevents Special Agents Fox Mulder, Dana Scully, John Doggett and Monica Reyes from investigating cases dealing with the paranormal, dubbed X-Files.

Kersh first appeared as a guest role in several episodes of the series' sixth season, returning as a recurring character in the eighth and ninth seasons. Kersh's creation was driven by a need to place pressure on the character of Walter Skinner. The character has been met with mixed to negative critical responses, although he was initially positively received before coming to be considered a "one-note" role as the series progressed. Pickens, as part of the series' ensemble cast, earned a Screen Actors Guild Award nomination for his work.

== Character arc ==
Kersh's first appearance in the series was during the sixth season opening episode "The Beginning". As an Assistant Director, he temporarily became supervisor to Agents Fox Mulder (David Duchovny) and Dana Scully (Gillian Anderson) when they were assigned away from the X-Files division. During this time The Smoking Man could be seen in his office, reminiscent of his silent presence in Walter Skinner's office in early seasons. Kersh assigned Mulder and Scully mostly to menial tasks, such as terrorist details and Federal background checks. When they did investigate an X-File behind his back, Kersh would charge them for expenses they incurred on the case, forcing them to pay out of their own pocket. He also attempted to separate Mulder and Scully, believing that Mulder threw away a promising career as a criminal profiler, but that Scully's career could still be saved.

When Mulder and Scully were reassigned to the X-Files office, Kersh continued to climb the ladder, culminating in an assignment as Deputy Director of the Federal Bureau of Investigation. It was not long after his promotion that Mulder was abducted by aliens. At the beginning of the eighth season, Kersh assigned John Doggett (Robert Patrick) to run the manhunt for Mulder. When the manhunt failed, Doggett was assigned to the X-Files with Scully, until Mulder was found in "This Is Not Happening". When Mulder returned, Kersh refused to assign him to the X-Files, keeping Doggett in that position. When Mulder and Doggett pursued an unauthorized case, Kersh was prepared to fire them both, but Mulder accepted full responsibility and was dismissed from the FBI. Shortly thereafter, Mulder disappeared again. After Doggett saw Kersh in a late night meeting with two conspirators, Knowle Rohrer and Gene Crane, Doggett brought in Monica Reyes (Annabeth Gish) to help him investigate Kersh's involvement in Mulder's disappearance. The investigation turned up nothing. Although Doggett seemed convinced that Kersh was involved in the conspiracy, Kersh insisted that he was actually protecting Mulder.

During the ninth season, the Toothpick Man (Alan Dale), a key conspirator, could be seen in the company of Kersh, much like The Smoking Man before. During the series finale "The Truth", he sets up a kangaroo court to try Mulder and sentences him to death, deliberately ignoring evidence which would free him. However, he helps Doggett and Skinner free Mulder from a military prison. Following this, Kersh had to permanently close the X-Files to appease his irate superiors, which would remain closed until the Event Series episode My Struggle.

Kersh returns in the eleventh season, where he maintains his same job and tasks Mulder and Scully with finding an AWOL Skinner.

== Conceptual history ==
The character was named after Dr. Kersh and Anton Kersh, characters from Vampire Circus—a favourite film of series creator Chris Carter. According to writer and producer Frank Spotnitz, the creation of the Kersh character was due to the writers desiring to create another of the several characters in the series who put pressure on Walter Skinner.

When reflecting on the casting of James Pickens, Jr., Spotnitz called him "another great find", adding that "so many times over the course of the series we just got so lucky with the actors that we cast in these guest parts and just kept bringing them back because they were so wonderful. That's what happened with William B. Davis as the Cigarette-Smoking Man and with Nick Lea as Krycek, and with Mitch Pileggi as Walter Skinner, and that's what happened here with James Pickens. Just a fantastic actor, not at all like this person, really transformed himself to play this part". Spotnitz thought that, for a viewer who had weekly been watching The X-Files' sixth season, there was a great sense of gratification when—in the final moments of "One Son"—Spender essentially withdraws and tells Kersh that Mulder has been right, all along, precisely because the last thing that Kersh wanted was for Spender to behave in this way.

Pickens prepared for this role by observing several of Kersh's real-life counterparts at the FBI's Los Angeles office, where, according to the actor, the most useful thing he learned was that most of the people at Kersh's level had been with the Bureau for twenty or twenty-five years and had not reached their positions in the FBI hierarchy by taking their work less than seriously or bucking the system without good reason. Robert Patrick, who portrayed John Doggett, recognized that his own character and Kersh were "both military men – Air Force, Marines". Kersh was depicted as a United States Navy A-6 Intruder weapons officer during the Vietnam War. Both Patrick and director Kim Manners thought that, as Kersh, Pickens would "come in each week and just nail his stuff" regardless of what else was going on. Similarly, Frank Spotnitz thought that "Robert Patrick and James Pickens really had a chemistry, loved playing scenes together. And I think their scenes together were some of the finest ones in the last two years of the show."

== Reception ==
Michael Avalos, writing for the Knight Ridder Tribune, felt positively about the introduction of Kersh, saying he harbored "almost fond memories" of the former recurring character, Section Chief Scott Blevins, played by Charles Cioffi. George Avalos and Michael Liedtke from the Contra Costa Times reacted positive towards James Pickens, Jr.'s performance in the eighth season's "Via Negativa", saying the story "clicked" thanks to Kersh and Walter Skinner. Salon writer Aaron Kinner when writing a review for the ninth season, noted that he was the first black character since X's death in season four, while not positive towards the character's development during the ninth season and the season overall.

Writing for Cinefantastique about the character's introduction, Paul Vitaris called Pickens "a fine addition to the cast" of the series, describing his portrayal of Kersh as "a strong presence". However, during a review of the eighth season two years later, Vitaris described Kersh as "one of the most one-note characters yet" on the series. Robert Shearman and Lars Pearson, in their book Wanting to Believe: A Critical Guide to The X-Files, Millennium & The Lone Gunmen, describe Kersh's return in the eighth season as "contrived but forgivable". Shearman and Pearson noted that the character is "an effective obstruction to any number of X-Files cases, but he can hardly be considered a lead villain".

In 1999, Pickens was nominated for a Screen Actors Guild Award for Outstanding Performance by an Ensemble in a Drama Series for his work as Kersh, alongside Gillian Anderson, William B. Davis, David Duchovny, Mitch Pileggi and Chris Owens.

== Footnotes ==
=== References ===
- Meisler, Andy (2000). The End and the Beginning: The Official Guide to the X-Files Volume 5. HarperPrism. ISBN 0-06-107595-7.
- Shearman, Robert; Pearson, Lars (2009). Wanting to Believe: A Critical Guide to The X-Files, Millennium & The Lone Gunmen. Mad Norwegian Press. ISBN 978-0-9759446-9-1.
