= Monica Reyes =

Fictional character from the television series The X-Files

- The X-Files character
- First appearance: "This Is Not Happening" (February 25, 2001)
- Last appearance: "My Struggle IV" (March 21, 2018)
- Portrayed by: Annabeth Gish
- City: Washington, D.C.
- Born: Monica Julieta Reyes
- Date of Birth: March 13, 1968; Mexico City, Mexico

In-universe information
- Occupation: FBI Special Agent
- Partners: John Doggett
- Affiliations: Dana Scully (2001-2003); Fox Mulder (2001-2003); Walter Skinner (2001-2003); Cigarette Smoking Man (2018)
- Duration: 2001–2002, 2016, 2018
- Seasons: 8, 9, 10, 11

Monica Julieta Reyes /ˈreɪ.ɛz/ is a fictional character in the Fox science fiction-supernatural television series The X-Files. She is portrayed by Annabeth Gish. At first a Field Agent before becoming a Special Agent with the FBI, she works with her longtime friend and partner John Doggett in the X-Files office, which is concerned with the investigation of paranormal cases, dubbed "X-Files". Introduced in the series' eighth season, Reyes would become a main character throughout the entirety of its ninth season, before returning for a single-episode guest appearance in the tenth-season finale, and later in a recurring capacity during season eleven.

== Conceptual history ==
Monica was conceived to eventually replace Dana Scully (Gillian Anderson) as the series' female lead, with Anderson having expressed interest in leaving at the conclusion of the eighth season. The character was crafted to be a believer, similar to departing character Fox Mulder (David Duchovny), to contrast with the sceptical nature of John Doggett (Robert Patrick), who had already been established. The writers were required to create a character who was unlike any of the preconceived main characters that were a part of the series. This female character was initially named Karen Miller and then Jane Jones before the name "Monica Reyes" was decided upon, named after a friend of series creator Chris Carter's acquaintance who had an art gallery in Vancouver, British Columbia.

When the role was being cast, actress Annabeth Gish received a call from her agent, who informed her that the producers of The X-Files were looking for a new female character. Gish applied for the part, but her audition consisted of a meeting with writers Chris Carter and Frank Spotnitz. Spotnitz considered Reyes to be like Mulder in her optimism, faith and enjoyment of being open to beliefs, while still being somewhat different as she was more spiritual and subscribed to a more New Age-like view than Mulder had. Reyes was seen as different from both Mulder and the other main characters as she was somewhat more neurotic, scattered, and quirky. She smiled and laughed more than the other characters, having a nature that writer Frank Spotnitz felt was lighter, sunnier, brighter, warmer and more "overtly sexy".

The character of Brad Follmer was created in season nine to provide a love interest for Reyes, as the writers believed the audience needed to know more about her. However, Follmer's unresolved relationship with Reyes also served to heighten the conflict between Doggett and Follmer, as both men had feelings for her. Portraying actress Annabeth Gish was pleased that the relationship between her character and Scully was similar to that of two sisters, rather than Reyes serving as an antagonist to Scully.

The ninth-season episode "Hellbound", in which Reyes discovers that she was apparently reincarnated, began as an effort to give Reyes or Doggett a "drive" or sense of motivation, as they were seen by the writers as the successors to Mulder and Scully. According to the writer of the episode, David Amann, executive producer Frank Spotnitz was interested in giving Reyes "some darkness to play" and her past life was consequently written with sombre overtones.

== Background ==
Monica Reyes was born and raised in Mexico City, Mexico, and speaks fluent Spanish. She studied folklore and mythology at Brown University, and has a master's degree in Religious Studies. In 1990, Reyes enrolled in the Federal Bureau of Investigation at Quantico, Virginia. Her first assignment in the FBI was serving on a special taskforce investigating Satanic ritual abuse. Reyes then served in the New York City field office, where she became romantically involved with special agent Brad Follmer despite the FBI's strict anti-fraternization rules. Reyes was the head investigator in the kidnapping of 7 year-old Luke Doggett, son of then NYPD officer John Doggett. The boy was eventually found dead, but no suspect was ever apprehended. In 1999, Monica Reyes transferred to the New Orleans field office. Sometime after 2002, Reyes departed from the FBI in a hurry and elected to work for The Smoking Man as a double agent.

== Character arc ==
=== Season 8 (2000–01) ===
In 2001, Reyes was contacted by Doggett, now an FBI agent assigned to X-Files department, to assist on a case involving the disappearances of several individuals who claimed to be alien abductees, as well as the disappearance of fellow agent Fox Mulder. Because of her background, Reyes considered that these believers may have simply formed a cult, but did not rule out the possibility of alien intervention. She stayed with the case until after Mulder was returned by his abductors, but returned to her field office soon after.

She later contacted Mulder, who was back to full health at the time, seeking help on a case she suspected had some link to the murder of Doggett's son. However, as before, she soon returned to her own work. Reyes remained with the New Orleans field office until she was called upon to protect agent Dana Scully in May 2001, driving her out to a remote location in Georgia so that the pregnant Scully might deliver her child out of harm's way. Reyes helped deliver the child, and made a permanent move soon afterwards, becoming Doggett's partner on The X-Files.

=== Season 9 (2001–02) ===
Season nine sees Reyes join the X-Files on a permanent basis, working with both John Doggett and Dana Scully. Following a year of investigating the paranormal, Doggett and Reyes were last seen in the New Mexico desert in 2002, where they were warning Agents Mulder and Scully of the arrival of Knowle Rohrer, a Super Soldier linked to the alien colonists. They were fleeing the scene as black helicopters destroyed the Anasazi adobes where The Smoking Man had been living. The X-Files office was closed shortly after the involvement of Walter Skinner and Alvin Kersh in Mulder's escape was revealed; Reyes still stayed with the FBI in some capacity for a time afterwards.

=== Between Seasons 9 and 10 ===
Shortly after the closure of the X-Files, Reyes was contacted by the Smoking Man who had somehow survived his apparent death in "The Truth", albeit at the cost of suffering devastating injuries. In exchange for her assistance, he offered her a place amongst the survivors of the End Times, who would be spared from the effects of the "Spartan" virus, administered to the population via smallpox vaccinations. Shortly thereafter, Reyes departed from her career at the FBI, electing to take the Smoking Man's offer. She reluctantly spent the following decade aiding him in his cause with the Conspiracy of Men to develop a scheme to depopulate the planet, scheduled to begin in 2012.

=== Season 10 (2016) ===
Following multiple outbreaks nationwide linked to the Spartan virus, Reyes contacted Dana Scully in early 2016, willing to share the knowledge needed to develop an appropriate vaccine. During their meeting, Reyes revealed to Scully the circumstances behind her alliance with the Smoking Man. She also revealed that as a result of her abduction experience in 1994, Scully would be granted immunity from the Spartan virus. Reyes' new loyalties left Scully feeling temporarily betrayed. However, Scully refers to Reyes as a "trusted friend" when speaking to Agent Einstein, saying "it's not too late to stop it" when they begin working on a vaccine. She is not seen again in the episode.

=== Season 11 (2018) ===
In the eleventh-season premiere, it is revealed that despite the events of the season ten finale "My Struggle II" being a part of Scully's vision, Monica is still working for The Smoking Man as one of his confidants and as a member of the new Syndicate. She apprehends her former Assistant Director Walter Skinner at gunpoint and offers to protect him from the Spartan virus if he finds Mulder and Scully's child, William, first.

In the season finale, "My Struggle IV", she contacts Mulder and Scully with information pertaining to their son, William, revealing that she is working from the inside to keep them safe. She later appears at the crime scene where William was last seen, and later takes The Smoking Man to Norfolk, Virginia where they have located him. Monica is then shot during a confrontation with Walter Skinner, however, her fate, and whether she actually died, is left up to the viewers. "In Post-production, and 11 hour decision was made to move the position of the bullet hole, keeping alive the possibility that Monica might not be dead." Source: The X-Files: Solve for X (DVD bonus). The bullet hole was moved from the centre of the frontal bone, which would take the bullet straight through the brain, to further up and to the right that may have allowed for a less invasive bullet trajectory.

=== Reception ===
The character of Monica Reyes has attracted mixed reviews from critics. Gish's portrayal of the character has been described by Entertainment Weekly's Ken Tucker as "ferocious yet lissome". Robert Shearman and Lars Pearson, in their book Wanting to Believe: A Critical Guide to The X-Files, Millennium & The Lone Gunmen, felt that Reyes' introduction in "This Is Not Happening" was "rather forced", finding her upbeat personality at odds with the tone of the series at that time; Shearman and Pearson also felt that the overall use of the character in season nine was "lazy", with her willingness to believe in anything compromising the tension of episodes such as "4-D" or "Hellbound". However, Shearman considered the character's appearance in "Empedocles" to be "very clever", while Gish's acting in "4-D" was described as "stand out". Writing for The New York Times, Joyce Millman described Reyes and her partner Doggett as "the Diet Coke of Mulder and Scully", referring to their secondary standing. Fellow New York Times writer Caryn James felt that Reyes and Doggett were "colorless", and "a shadow" of their predecessors, noting that "where Scully and Mulder's muted sexual attraction linked them to reality, Doggett and Reyes's chemistry was nonexistent, even as platonic partners".

== See also ==
- Dana Scully
