= Musings of a Cigarette Smoking Man =

- The X-Files episode
- The Smoking Man assassinates President Kennedy. Glen Morgan, writer of the episode, wanted to show that the Smoking Man was the most dangerous person alive.
- Episode no.: Season 4 Episode 7
- Directed by: James Wong
- Written by: Glen Morgan
- Production code: 4X07
- Original air date: November 17, 1996
- Running time: 44 minutes

Guest appearances
- William B. Davis as The Smoking Man; Chris Owens as Young Smoking Man; Tom Braidwood as Melvin Frohike; Bruce Harwood as John Fitzgerald Byers; Jerry Hardin as Deep Throat; Morgan Weisser as Lee Harvey Oswald; Donnelly Rhodes as General Francis; Peter Hanlon as Aide; Dean Aylesworth as Young Bill Mulder; Paul Jarrett as James Earl Ray; David Fredericks as Director; Laurie Murdoch as Lydon; Jude Zachary as Jones; Tim Bissett as Cook; Fred Beale as Newsstand Operator

Episode chronology
← Previous "Sanguinarium"	Next → "Tunguska"
- The X-Files season 4

"Musings of a Cigarette Smoking Man" is the seventh episode of the fourth season of the science fiction television series The X-Files. It premiered on the Fox network in the United States on November 17, 1996. It was written by Glen Morgan, directed by James Wong, and featured the first guest appearance by Chris Owens, appearing as a younger Smoking Man. "Musings of a Cigarette Smoking Man" earned a Nielsen household rating of 10.7, being watched by 17.09 million people in its initial broadcast. The episode received mostly positive reviews from television critics.

The show centers on FBI special agents Fox Mulder (David Duchovny) and Dana Scully (Gillian Anderson) who work on cases linked to the paranormal, called X-Files. Mulder is a believer in the paranormal, while the skeptical Scully has been assigned to debunk his work. In this episode, Lone Gunman Melvin Frohike (Tom Braidwood) finds a tell-tale magazine story supposedly revealing the history of The Smoking Man (William B. Davis). The episode illustrates his possible involvement in several historical events and assassinations, although the reliability of the source is unresolved at the end of the episode. Davis is credited as a starring cast member for the first time in this episode.

Executive producer Frank Spotnitz later noted that the canonicity of events related in the episode is unclear. The production of the episode did not require extensive use of Duchovny and Anderson on screen. The former's voice is only heard and the latter appears only in archival footage. Davis was pleased with the episode, although confused with some apparent contradictions in the script. Although not directly furthering the series' overarching mythology, the episode involves several of its events and characters.

== Plot ==
The Smoking Man, armed with a sniper rifle and surveillance equipment, spies on a meeting between Fox Mulder, Dana Scully, and the Lone Gunmen. Frohike claims to have discovered information about the Smoking Man's mysterious past, stating that his father was an executed communist spy and that his mother died of lung cancer, causing him to be raised in various Midwest orphanages.

The narrative changes to 1962. The Smoking Man is an Army captain stationed at Fort Bragg in North Carolina. He talks to a friend and fellow soldier, Bill Mulder, who shows him a photo of his infant son, Fox. The Smoking Man is summoned to attend a meeting with a general and several strange men in suits. The general calls the Smoking Man's late communist father an "extraordinary man" in spite of the threat he posed to national security, and indicates that he expects the Smoking Man to inherit his father's courage to act decisively and take drastic measures in defense of his principles. It is revealed that the Smoking Man was already involved in Bay of Pigs Invasion and the assassinations of Patrice Lumumba and Rafael Trujillo. Ostensibly for these reasons, they selected him to assassinate President John F. Kennedy. In November 1963, posing as a "Mr. Hunt," the Smoking Man shoots Kennedy and frames Lee Harvey Oswald. Afterwards, he smokes his first cigarette from a pack previously given to him by Oswald. The assassination is motivated by Kennedy's "mishandling" of the Bay of Pigs Invasion, the subsequent Cuban Missile Crisis and because he was turning away from the Cold War and seeking a negotiated peace with the Soviet Union.

Five years later, the Smoking Man writes an adventure novel using the pen name "Raul Bloodworth". After hearing Martin Luther King Jr. give a speech arguing that "communism is a judgment against our failure to make democracy real," the Smoking Man meets with a group of men, including J. Edgar Hoover. These men propose various plots similar to a previous failed plot to undermine King's marriage and manipulate him into committing suicide, but the Smoking Man believes a more "intense" solution is required. Unlike most of the men present, the Smoking Man admires King, but believes that his opposition to the Vietnam War might convince African Americans to object to fighting, causing the United States to lose. He convinces the group to have King assassinated and volunteers to personally carry out the assassination. Shortly thereafter, a publishing company rejects his novel draft.

In 1991, the Smoking Man meets with subordinates, discussing his orchestration of the Anita Hill controversy and the Rodney King trial, as well as the Buffalo Bills' loss at the Super Bowl. He further reveals his drugging of a Soviet goaltender to ensure the outcome of the "Miracle on Ice" hockey match. He is also seen in direct talks with Saddam Hussein and is disappointed when he learns of Mikhail Gorbachev's resignation. One of the Smoking Man's subordinates invites him for a family dinner. The Smoking Man politely declines and states that he is scheduled to visit family. On his way out of the meeting, he distributes his Christmas presents to each of the subordinates. All receive the same gift: a striped tie. He is next seen walking past Mulder's office.

Later, while at home, the Smoking Man receives an urgent phone call from Deep Throat, who meets him near the site of a UFO wreck. An alien from the UFO survived the wreck but is critically injured and apparently on life support. Deep Throat and the Smoking Man reminisce about the multiple times they changed the course of history "from the shadows," without any public recognition. Deep Throat persuades the Smoking Man that the alien must be killed, pursuant to a UNSC resolution stipulating that any signatory nation that comes into possession of an E.B.E. shall kill it. The two men flip a coin to decide who will fulfill this obligation. Deep Throat loses the coin toss, and reluctantly shoots the alien.

A few months later, in March 1992, the Smoking Man attends the meeting where Scully is assigned to the X-Files and eavesdrops on her first meeting with Mulder. In 1996, he receives a letter telling him that his novel will be serialized in a magazine. The Smoking Man types up a resignation letter, quits smoking, and excitedly seeks out a copy of the magazine issue at a newsstand. However, he finds that the ending has been changed. Bitter, the Smoking Man sits on a bench with a homeless man and delivers a pessimistic and likely satirical monologue comparing life to a box of chocolates. He tears up his resignation letter, resumes his smoking habit, and leaves the magazine at the bench.

Returning to the present year, Frohike tells Mulder and Scully that the account he told them is based on a purportedly fictional story he read in a magazine to which he subscribes. Frohike decides to investigate and verify the story and as he leaves, the Smoking Man aims his rifle at him. Although he has a clear shot, he decides not to kill Frohike, quoting aloud to himself the last line from his unpublished novel: "I can kill you whenever I please, but not today".

== Production ==
=== Writing ===
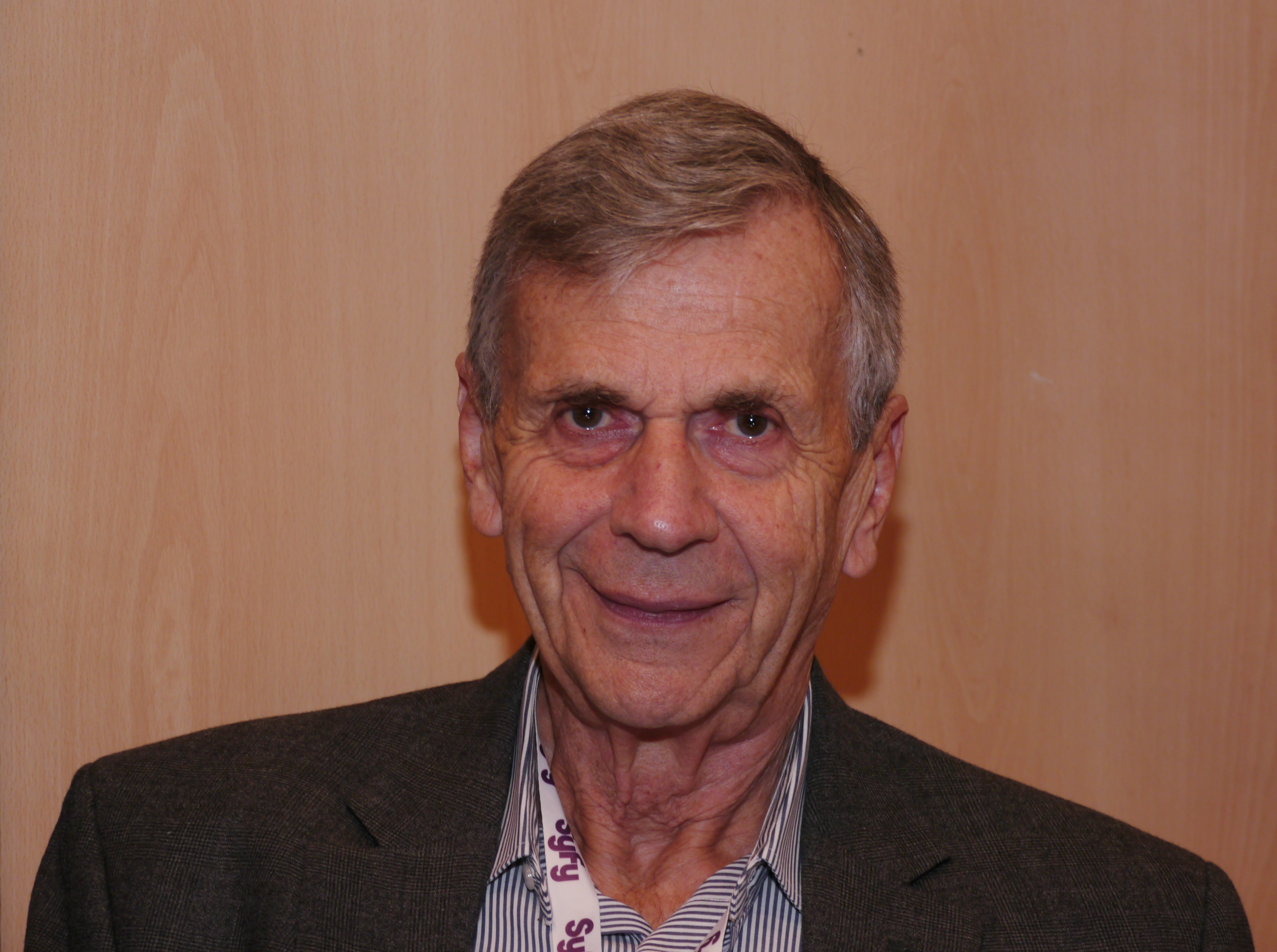
William B. Davis was pleased to have an episode revolve around his character.

Written by Glen Morgan and directed by James Wong, "Musings of a Cigarette Smoking Man" was inspired by the DC Graphic Novel Lex Luthor: The Unauthorized Biography (1989); Morgan later explained that he wanted the episode to show that The Smoking Man was extremely dangerous. This was to be emphasized by the episode's original ending, which featured The Smoking Man killing Melvin Frohike. However, the show's executive staff vetoed the idea.

The episode contains several references to Space: Above and Beyond, a Fox series that Morgan and Wong had co-created. These in-jokes include: the name of The Smoking Man's novel Take a Chance, the reference to "classified compartmentalized", and the name Jack Colquitt. In addition, Morgan Weisser, who played Lee Harvey Oswald, was an actor who appeared on Space: Above and Beyond. U.N. Resolution 1013, quoted by Deep Throat, is a reference both to Carter's birthday as well as his production company. Walden Roth, the name of the editor who buys The Smoking Man's novel, is a reference to 20th Century Fox executives Dana Walden and Peter Roth. The Smoking Man's ambition to be a novelist was based on CIA intelligence officer E. Howard Hunt, who was also a prolific author of fiction.

Davis was excited that the show wanted to focus on his character, but he was confused as to why a character who killed not only John F. Kennedy but also Martin Luther King Jr. would worry about minor things like preventing the Buffalo Bills from winning the Super Bowl. Chris Carter said:

I had to speak with Bill several times; I spent hours with him on the telephone talking about the character, because the actor felt that the episode really made the character something that it wasn't. I tried to explain to him, as I think Jim and Glen were trying to express, that even if your mission in life is a destroyer, that you still have some hope in the back of your mind that you can be a creator — and that this all of a sudden, this vanity, is his vanity. And we see that so clearly here and it makes him sort of a silly person.

=== Filming ===
Producer J.P. Finn coordinated the sequence in which The Smoking Man assassinates John F. Kennedy; it was filmed in a Vancouver location that looked somewhat like Dealey Plaza. The show's costume designers studied the reproduction of Jackie Kennedy's pink suit used in the film JFK (1991) to create one for the show. The SS-100-X mock-up featured in this episode was created by vehicle coordinator Nigel Habgood, using a heavily modified Lincoln Continental. In regards to direction, Davis later said "Jim Wong ... was a big help, too. A lot of the stage directions point toward farce, but Jim told me to play against that and just let the situation play out. The Forrest Gump scene was difficult, too. When I prepared it and did it the first time, I was almost Shakespearean in my approach. Jim made me toss it off more, and it worked fine".

Chris Owens, who was cast as the Young Smoking Man, spent considerable time studying how Davis smokes cigarettes to make sure that he would smoke them the same way, thereby preserving continuity. Owens would reprise his role as a young version of The Smoking Man again in the episode "Demons", and he would also play Jeffrey Spender (the son of The Smoking Man) in subsequent seasons. David Duchovny and Gillian Anderson feature primarily through voice recordings in the opening sequence. The episode was the first in the series where Mulder does not make a physical appearance; Scully appears only in archival footage from "Pilot". While it was not the intention of the show's writers to give the lead actors "a week off", this effectively came to pass—a turn of events with which Duchovny was very pleased. Tom Braidwood appears briefly on screen in the episode's final scene, but is otherwise restricted to voiceover; Bruce Harwood also makes a brief voice cameo in the opening scene. Jerry Hardin reprises his role as Deep Throat, who is named as "Ronald" for the only time in the series' original run; the episode "This" later confirmed his name as Ronald Pakula.

== Reception ==
"Musings of a Cigarette Smoking Man" premiered on the Fox network on November 17, 1996. This episode earned a Nielsen rating of 10.7, with a 15 share, meaning that roughly 10.7 percent of all television-equipped households, and 15 percent of households watching television, were tuned in to the episode. It was viewed by 17.09 million viewers. James Wong earned the show's first ever Emmy nomination for Outstanding Directing for a Drama Series for this episode, although he later lost to NYPD Blue's Mark Tinker.

Few viewers picked up on the notion that the events of this episode were not necessarily reliable. Story editor Frank Spotnitz said "In the closing scene Frohike tells Mulder and Scully that the whole story was something he read in a crummy magazine. A lot of people didn't pick up on that subtlety. They thought that this was indeed the factual history of the CSM. As far as I'm concerned, it's not. Some of it may indeed be true, and some of it may — well, never mind".

"Musings of a Cigarette Smoking Man" received mostly positive praise from critics. Entertainment Weekly gave the episode an "A−", noting that "one has to wonder to what extent this episode is intended as information, and to what extent sheer entertainment". Reviewer Zack Handlen of The A.V. Club spoke positively of the episode, saying "I love this ... and watching it now, I still do". He ultimately gave the episode an "A" and wrote, "'Musings' is great because it transforms CSM from a living ghost into the walking dead—still horrifying, still dangerous, but pitiable just the same". Robert Shearman, in his book Wanting to Believe: A Critical Guide to The X-Files, Millennium & The Lone Gunmen, named the episode "one of The X-Files' true masterpieces" and awarded it five stars out of five. The author praised Morgan and Wong's combination of mythological story elements with more dry and dark humor. Furthermore, Shearman wrote positively of the ambiguousness of the episode's authenticity, noting that "the answers that the viewers are craving are handed out here on such a large plate, you can only take them as a delicious parody." Paula Vitaris from Cinefantastique gave the episode a glowing review and awarded it four stars out of four. She praised the way that the viewer is able to see the "barren emotional landscape in which the Cigarette Smoking Man dwells" via the "tone of the script". Furthermore, Vitaris applauded the Forrest Gump-esque rant, calling it "a comic high point of verbal venom".

Not all reviews were so positive. Author Phil Farrand was critical of the episode, rating it his fifth least favorite episode of the first four seasons. He criticized the entry for having an uninteresting first half, and relying on the "cliche" of the John F. Kennedy assassination. Furthermore, he was unhappy with the fact that viewers did not have any way of knowing whether the content of the episode really happened. Alan Kurtz criticized the episode for being inconsistent with the timetable of The X-Files, pointing to the fact that the episode contradicts canon that was established in the third season episode "Apocrypha". Furthermore, he derided the show for too closely mirroring the plots of the 1979 movie Apocalypse Now as well as Forrest Gump.

== See also ==
- Assassination of John F. Kennedy in popular culture

== Bibliography ==
- Farrand, Phil (1997). The Nitpicker's Guide for X-Philes. Dell Publishing. ISBN 0-440-50808-8.
- Hurwitz, Matt; Knowles, Chris (2008). The Complete X-Files. Insight Editions. ISBN 978-1-933784-72-4.
- Meisler, Andy (1998). I Want to Believe: The Official Guide to the X-Files. Perennial Currents. ISBN 0-06-105386-4.
- Shearman, Robert (2009). Wanting to Believe: A Critical Guide to The X-Files, Millennium & The Lone Gunmen. Mad Norwegian Press. ISBN 978-0975944691.
