= The X-Files season 11 =

Season of television series

The X-Files
- Season 11
- DVD and Blu-ray cover
- Starring: David Duchovny; Gillian Anderson; Mitch Pileggi
- No. of episodes: 10

Release
- Original network: Fox
- Original release: January 3 – March 21, 2018

Season chronology
- ← Previous; Season 10

The eleventh and final season of the American science fiction television series The X-Files premiered on January 3, 2018, on Fox. The season consists of ten episodes and concluded on March 21, 2018. It follows newly re-instated Federal Bureau of Investigation (FBI) agents Fox Mulder (David Duchovny) and Dana Scully (Gillian Anderson). The season's storyline picks up directly after last season's finale and the search for Mulder and Scully's son William is the main story arc of the season.

== Plot overview ==
Dana Scully (Gillian Anderson) wakes up in the hospital after having a seizure, now realizing the events of "My Struggle II" were a vision and haven't actually happened yet. Mulder initially presumes Scully’s ramblings are a product of her illness but leaves the hospital to investigate. Agent Jeffrey Spender later appears at Scully’s bedside, revealing that someone is looking for William. He first balks at telling her the location of her son, revealing only the name of the family that adopted him—Van De Kamp. Mulder tails a henchman who he believes will take him to The Smoking Man, but he arrives somewhere else with mysterious conspirators; Mr. Y (A.C. Peterson) and Erika Price (Barbara Hershey).

They try to negotiate with Mulder into turning over his son but Mulder refuses. Walter Skinner (Mitch Pileggi) tries to meet with Scully, but can't find her. As he goes to his car, he is met inside by The Smoking Man and Reyes. Meanwhile, Scully tries to leave the hospital but her seizures return causing her to crash her car. She is rescued by Agent Einstein and Agent Miller, and is readmitted to the hospital. Both agents leave the room. An assassin sent by Mr. Y and Erika enters and tries to suffocate Scully, but Mulder steps in and saves her by slicing the assassin's neck. As Skinner comes in, Mulder confronts him since he smells like smoke. In a flashback to when Skinner was in the car with the Smoking Man, the latter reveals, in a further flashback to 17 years, "En Ami", that he, not Mulder, artificially impregnated Scully.

Scully opens her eyes in the dark, lying on her side on a bed in a mysterious house. She explores the mysterious house and ends up in an endless pattern of the same room. Mulder theorizes that the experience is a type of sleep paralysis. She goes back to her memories of her sleep paralysis, where she grabs a snow globe with a model of the boat in it. Mulder and Scully get to the dock, meeting with Detective Costa (Louis Ferreira). Later, Scully’s attention is drawn to a man that observes them intently from one of the portable walkways. Costa informs them that the victims asked if they found Ghouli. When Scully turns to check if the mystery guy is there, he’s gone.

Both agents investigate the two teenagers about the slashing. Both of them go on about the experience and their boyfriend, Jackson Van De Kamp. The agents arrive at the Van De Kamp household, the same house Scully saw in her dream. Two gunshots are heard with a third coming from upstairs. Scully goes up and finds the bleeding corpse of Jackson Van De Kamp. As they leave the room and the door clicks closed, the zipper opens slowly. Jackson sits up and escapes the room. Mulder meets with Skinner at the Chimera, telling him to drop the investigation. Mulder confirms that Jackson's DNA matches Scully's.

At the hospital, Jackson explains to Brianna that he’s been hiding because there are people after him. He reveals that Ghouli doesn't exist and it's just something he "made up". Jackson escapes the hospital after the death of the DOD members. The next day, Scully spots a rural gas station that has a windmill just outside. Scully meets with Peter Wong with Wong mentioning that he wishes he could know her better. The agents ask to see the recording tapes. In the recording, Scully is having a conversation with William. She smiles as Mulder holds her while they see their son, alive. Over the course of the season, they search for William. In the third episode of the "Plus One", Scully and Mulder are intimate again. In the season 11 finale, "My Struggle IV", she reveals to Mulder that she is pregnant with his child. Also in the finale, the Smoking Man shoots William, who has made himself look like Mulder.

== Cast ==
=== Main cast ===
- David Duchovny as Fox Mulder, an FBI special agent assigned to the newly reopened X-Files division. He remains a believer in the paranormal and the existence of extraterrestrial life, though, throughout the series, his faith begins to waver.
- Gillian Anderson as Dana Scully, a medical doctor and FBI special agent assigned to the X-Files. Although an initial skeptic, after Mulder's abduction, she became more open-minded about the possibility of extraterrestrial life.
- Mitch Pileggi as Walter Skinner, an assistant director at the FBI and an ally of Mulder and Scully's. (Note: Only credited for the episodes he appears in.)

=== Recurring cast ===
- William B. Davis as Cigarette Smoking Man, a former government official, and nemesis of Mulder and Scully, who worked to cover up the truth of the existence of aliens and their plan to colonize the Earth. Jeremy Schuetze portrays a younger version of this character in flashbacks.
- Barbara Hershey as Erika Price
- Miles Robbins as Jackson Van De Kamp/William Scully, the son of Dana Scully who was placed for adoption.

=== Guest cast ===
- Annabeth Gish as Monica Reyes, a former FBI agent previously assigned to the X-Files division.
- James Pickens Jr. as Alvin Kersh, the Deputy Director of the FBI
- Lauren Ambrose as Agent Liz Einstein, a medical doctor, Miller's partner, and a hard-skeptic.
- Robbie Amell as Agent Kyd Miller, an open-minded FBI agent who believes in the paranormal, and is Einstein's partner.
- Chris Owens as Jeffrey Spender
- Dean Haglund as Langly, one of The Lone Gunmen.
- Haley Joel Osment as Davey James
- Joel McHale as Tad O'Malley

== Episodes ==
Episodes marked with a double dagger (‡) are episodes in the series' alien mythology arc.

No. overall	No. in season	Title	Directed by	Written by	Original release date	Prod. code	U.S. viewers (millions)
209	1	"My Struggle III"‡	Chris Carter	Chris Carter	January 3, 2018	2AYW01	5.15
Scully is hospitalized after having a seizure brought on by a vision of the future that involved William, her and Mulder's son. Mulder sets out to investigate, inadvertently crossing paths with former Syndicate members Mr. Y and Erika Price, whose mission is to colonize the universe. Walter Skinner is detained by Monica Reyes and the Smoking Man, who offers protection against the coming human-alien war. Skinner seems only interested in helping Mulder and Scully, by looking for William. The Smoking Man reveals that he fathered William by pairing his DNA with aliens and impregnating Scully.
210	2	"This"	Glen Morgan	Glen Morgan	January 10, 2018	2AYW02	3.95
Mulder and Scully are contacted by the virtual consciousness of Richard Langly, which is part of an NSA simulation designed to come to life when participants die. Langly asks his friends to shut down the program because the entities there have become digital slaves and their ideas are being harvested. Mulder discovers that Erika Price is responsible for the simulation and is using it to aid with her own agenda. He buys some time for Scully, who manages to turn off the simulation's servers, which later cannot be found once an FBI team returns to investigate.
211	3	"Plus One"	Kevin Hooks	Chris Carter	January 17, 2018	2AYW03	3.95
Following up on several deaths in which the victims were being stalked by their doppelgängers, Mulder and Scully investigate the Poundstone twins, whose telepathic game of Hangman using people's names proves deadly.
212	4	"The Lost Art of Forehead Sweat"	Darin Morgan	Darin Morgan	January 24, 2018	2AYW04	3.87
Reginald Murgatroid covertly meets with Mulder and Scully to discuss the Mandela Effect, their perceived reality, and the origins of The X-Files, including his being part of their team.
213	5	"Ghouli"‡	James Wong	James Wong	January 31, 2018	2AYW05	3.64
Two teenagers attack one another, each believing the other is a monster; Scully experiences sleep paralysis. The two events are connected, leading Mulder and Scully to their son William.
214	6	"Kitten"	Carol Banker	Gabe Rotter	February 7, 2018	2AYW06	3.74
Mulder and Scully travel to Mud Lick, a small town in rural Kentucky in search of Walter Skinner, who has disappeared without warning. There they find the town on the verge of hysteria following a series of suspicious deaths, unexplained illnesses and rumours of a monster lurking on the town's outskirts.
215	7	"Rm9sbG93ZXJz" (Note: This is Base64 for "Followers".)	Glen Morgan	Shannon Hamblin & Kristen Cloke	February 28, 2018	2AYW07	3.23
In a cold open, a robotic voice explains that an AI was built in 2016 and launched into the Internet so that it could learn. Its creators realized it was learning racism and hate, so they shut it down. Mulder and Scully try to dine in a fully automated sushi restaurant. When Mulder is served the wrong meal, he refuses to pay a tip. Thereafter, the AI's hardware glitches; attempts to get home in smart cars go awry; and they find themselves harassed by aerial drones and their own smartphones. Resentfully, the AI annoys them until the tip is paid.
216	8	"Familiar"	Holly Dale	Benjamin Van Allen	March 7, 2018	2AYW09	3.46
After a brutal animal attack of a little boy in Connecticut, Mulder and Scully discover the town has dark secrets involving the dark forces of witchcraft.
217	9	"Nothing Lasts Forever"	James Wong	Karen Nielsen	March 14, 2018	2AYW08	3.01
When a man is abducted and stripped of his organs, Mulder and Scully find evidence that suggests the crime is a ritual killing. Their investigation leads them to a cult headed by Barbara Beaumont, a reclusive former television star, and her partner Randolph Luvenis. The cult have been consuming the organs of the victims and surgically conjoining themselves together to try to reverse the ageing process.
218	10	"My Struggle IV"‡	Chris Carter	Chris Carter	March 21, 2018	2AYW10	3.43
Mulder and Scully continue to search for their long lost son, William, while Cigarette Smoking Man pushes to find the secret of the boy and his powers.

== Production ==
In May 2015, in an interview with Entertainment Weekly, co-star David Duchovny stated that if the 2016 revival were successful, he would be interested in another renewal, stating, "I would be open to doing another cycle. I don't know that I could do a 20-episode version of this show at this point in my life, and I don't know that Gillian could. But I think everybody is open ended on what happens after this. Certainly, we didn't bring it back with the idea of ending it." At the 2016 Television Critics Association panel for the series, creator Chris Carter stated, "If we do well in the ratings, I can't imagine we wouldn't be asked to do more."

Fox Television Group chairman and CEO Gary Newman stated that he and fellow executive Dana Walden would be open to another renewal, stating, "We would love to do this again, so we'd be on board if schedules can be worked out." In an interview with Variety prior to the premiere, co-star Gillian Anderson, Duchovny, and Walden stated their willingness for another renewal. In an interview with TV Guide, Carter reaffirmed plans for more episodes, but stressed that everyone involved is waiting on the success of the season. In May 2016, Walden confirmed that there had been conversations about an eleventh season possibly for the 2017–18 television season.

On April 20, 2017, Fox announced that The X-Files would be returning for an eleventh season of ten episodes, which would air in the 2017–18 television season after filming in mid-2017.

=== Writing ===
The writing staff for the eleventh season consists of Chris Carter, Glen Morgan, Darin Morgan, James Wong, and newcomers who were all previously part of The X-Files production staff, Gabe Rotter (writers assistant), Benjamin Van Allen (writers assistant) and Brad Follmer (Carter's personal assistant). In August 2017, it was announced that three female writers were added to the staff. Karen Nielsen, who worked as a script coordinator on season 10, wrote one episode, and Kristen Cloke and Shannon Hamblin wrote another episode based on a story by Glen Morgan. The season, consisting of 10 episodes, has two mythology episodes (the premiere and finale) and eight standalone episodes; however, several critics have considered episode five, "Ghouli", to also be a mythology episode.

=== Casting ===
In addition to Duchovny and Anderson, Mitch Pileggi was confirmed to reprise his role, as Walter Skinner. Also returning are William B. Davis as Cigarette Smoking Man and Annabeth Gish as Monica Reyes. In August 2017, it was confirmed that Robbie Amell and Lauren Ambrose would reprise their roles Agents Miller and Einstein from season ten. In September 2017, it was announced that Karin Konoval–who played Mrs. Peacock in the fourth-season episode "Home"–would play new characters in the eleventh season, in what Carter described as a "tour-de-force performance".

Anderson commented that this is her final season of The X-Files, saying, "I've said from the beginning this is it for me." However, Chris Carter affirmed he would not do The X-Files without her character, saying, "For me, The X-Files is Mulder and Scully. I think if it were without Scully, I wouldn't do it. That's not my X-Files." The writers intended to bring back Robert Patrick as his character John Doggett, but he was unavailable due to scheduling issues as he was filming for his TV series Scorpion. In February 2018, Carter stated in an interview that he could see the show continuing without Anderson.

=== Filming ===
Filming began in August 2017 in Vancouver, British Columbia, where the previous season was filmed, along with the show's original five seasons. After controversy sparked regarding the lack of female writers or directors on the series, it was announced in August 2017 that Carol Banker, a script supervisor on the original series who also directed an episode of The Lone Gunmen and Holly Dale were added as directors.

== Reception ==
=== Critical reviews ===
The eleventh season received generally positive reviews from critics and currently has a Metacritic score of 67 out of 100 based on 18 reviews. On Rotten Tomatoes, the season has an approval rating of 77% with an average rating of 6.65 out of 10 based on 170 reviews. The site's consensus reads, "Though it may not make many new believers, The X-Files return to business as usual is a refreshing upgrade from the show's underwhelming previous outing." Similar to season 10, the premiere and finale episodes of season 11 received poor reviews, while the stand-alone episodes occurring between them were much more favorably received.

Based on the first five episodes available for review, Liz Shannon Miller of IndieWire gave the season a positive review with a "B+" grade. While Miller wrote that the season premiere "is not good", she was much more positive of the following four standalone episodes, writing that "there are some intriguing mysteries, some eerie moments, solid action" and praised Darin Morgan's comedy installment, calling it "fantastic". Overall, she concluded, "Season 11 so far isn't flawless, but it's a lively, character-focused affair that feels far more unified than we'd ever anticipated, a massive improvement over Season 10 that gives us genuine hope for the second half. For the first time in a while, we're truly excited to see more."

Matt Zoller Seitz of Vulture stated that compared to the previous season, "This new batch of episodes is considerably stronger. Even the ones that don't really do much but spin their wheels do so with feeling, and when the show is great—as it is, yet again, in Darin Morgan's episode—it's downright sublime."

The X-Files season 11: Critical reception by episode
Season 11 (2018): Percentage of positive critics' reviews tracked by the website Rotten Tomatoes

=== Ratings ===
Viewership and ratings per episode of The X-Files season 11
No.	Title	Air date	Rating/share (18–49)	Viewers (millions)	DVR viewers (millions)	Total viewers (millions)
1	"My Struggle III"	January 3, 2018	1.3/5	5.15	2.34	7.49
2	"This"	January 10, 2018	1.0/4	3.95	1.99	5.94
3	"Plus One"	January 17, 2018	1.1/4	3.95	0.60	4.55
4	"The Lost Art of Forehead Sweat"	January 24, 2018	1.0/4	3.87	1.75	5.62
5	"Ghouli"	January 31, 2018	0.9/3	3.64	—N/a	—N/a
6	"Kitten"	February 7, 2018	0.9/4	3.74	—N/a	—N/a
7	"Rm9sbG93ZXJz"	February 28, 2018	0.8/3	3.23	1.386	4.616
8	"Familiar"	March 7, 2018	0.9/4	3.46	—N/a	—N/a
9	"Nothing Lasts Forever"	March 14, 2018	0.7/3	2.949	1.379	4.328
10	"My Struggle IV"	March 21, 2018	0.9/3	3.43	—N/a	—N/a
