= Ghouli =

- The X-Files episode
- Episode no.: Season 11; Episode 5
- Directed by: James Wong
- Written by: James Wong
- Production code: 2AYW05
- Original air date: January 31, 2018
- Running time: 43 minutes

Guest appearances
- William B. Davis as Cigarette Smoking Man; Miles Robbins as Jackson Van De Kamp / William; Madeleine Arthur as Sarah Turner; Sarah Jeffery as Brianna Stapleton; Louis Ferreira as Detective Costa; Ben Cotton as Mr. Paulsen; Zak Santiago as Mr. Green; François Chau as Peter Wong

Episode chronology
← Previous "The Lost Art of Forehead Sweat"	Next → "Kitten"
- The X-Files season 11

"Ghouli" is the fifth episode of the eleventh season of the American science fiction television series The X-Files. The episode was written and directed by James Wong. The tagline for this episode is "You see what I want you to see". Though not originally billed as a mythology episode, "Ghouli" helps to explore the series' overarching mythology and serves as the second of three mythology episodes of the season following the season premiere.

The show centers on FBI special agents who work on unsolved paranormal cases called X-Files, focusing on the investigations of Fox Mulder (David Duchovny), and Dana Scully (Gillian Anderson) after their reinstatement in the FBI. In this episode, A pair of teenage girls attack one another, each believing the other to be a monster, known as "Ghouli." Mulder and Scully find that their investigation leads back to their long-lost son, William.

== Plot ==
Two teenage girls, Sarah Turner (Madeleine Arthur) and Brianna Stapleton (Sarah Jeffery), separately enter an abandoned ship named Chimera. When they encounter each other, each girl accuses the other of being "Ghouli." Brianna grows impatient and runs across the rotten wood deck that collapses under her. She lands inside the bridge, where the terrified Sarah screams, wielding a knife at her. Each sees the other as the Ghouli, and they stab each other.

Dana Scully (Gillian Anderson) opens her eyes in the dark, sensing a presence behind her as she lies on a bed in a strange house. She explores the house and ends up in an endless pattern of the same room. It all turns out to be a dream. Fox Mulder (David Duchovny) theorizes that the experience is a type of sleep paralysis. She tries to remember when she spots a picture on Mulder’s desk of the Chimera. At the crime scene, the agents meet with Detective Costa (Louis Ferreira). Aboard the ship, Scully notices a bloody handprint left by one of the girls on the bridge and questions who made the call. Costa informs them that it was an anonymous 9-1-1 call from a panicked male. Costa informs them that the victims asked if they found Ghouli.

Mulder and Scully question the two teenagers about the slashing. Both of them name their boyfriend, Jackson Van De Kamp, whose last name matches William's adoptive parents. The agents arrive at the Van De Kamp household, which Scully recognizes from her dream. Hearing two gunshots, the agents dash into the house and discover a man and a woman's bodies on the floor. A third shot is heard from the upstairs, where Scully finds the bleeding corpse of Jackson Van De Kamp. The agents search Jackson's room and find a book by Peter Wong, a pickup artist. Scully spots a snow globe.

Scully enters the morgue to see Jackson’s body. She sits by his side and begins talking to him, not knowing if he could be her son. Mulder ushers her out of the room. As they leave the room, Jackson unzips his own body bag and escapes the morgue. Scully is lying on a couch and has another experience with sleep paralysis, with flashes to the bridge, the UFO hovering above, and the bloodied alien hand. She is awakened by Dr. Harris, who tells her that Jackson's body has disappeared. Scully runs into the man that she spotted at the docks, Peter Wong (François Chau). Wong questions Scully about her windmill and tells her to not give up on the bigger picture.

Walter Skinner (Mitch Pileggi) meets with Mulder at the Chimera, telling him to drop the investigation. Mulder refuses and tells him that Jackson's DNA matches Scully's. The agents assume that William is at the hospital where the two girls are being treated. There, Jackson explains to Brianna that he’s been hiding because there are people after him and that he "made up" the Ghouli. Mulder and Scully arrive at the hospital and meet up with Costa, who tells them that Jackson is alive. It turns out that Sarah sent Costa a text with a picture of Jackson and Brianna kissing. Jackson tries to leave but is chased by Defense Department operatives. Cornered inside a supply closet, he resorts to tricking one of the operatives into thinking that the other is a monster, killing him. Jackson hides under a desk, while Mulder and Scully find two other operatives on the ground. Jackson escapes by projecting himself as a scared nurse.

The next day, Scully spots a rural gas station that has a windmill just outside, just like in the snow globe. Mulder goes to use the restroom and Scully meets with Peter Wong. Both of them engage in a conversation, with Wong mentioning that he wishes he could know her better. After Wong drives away, Mulder asks Scully whom she was talking to, prompting her to remember Wong, the author of the book found in Jackson's room. The agents go in the store and ask to see the surveillance tapes. In the recording, Scully is having a conversation with William. She smiles as Mulder holds her while they see their son, alive.

== Production ==
=== Filming ===
Filming for the season began in August 2017 in Vancouver, British Columbia, where the previous season was filmed, along with the show's original five seasons.

=== Writing ===
Wong was inspired to write this episode after having an experience with sleep paralysis in Mexico as he was shooting a movie. "I experienced this crazy thing in a hotel: I felt a presence in the room, I couldn’t move. I was being chased or chased after this entity and then was in bed again. That was the genesis. It really affected me. So that’s how I started with it. And it was the fifth episode, so we wanted to have a touchstone to the mythology of it all. [Executive producers] Chris [Carter], Glen [Morgan], Darin [Morgan] and I all talked about the idea of William. But I also loved the monster episodes. So it was how can we meld those two ideas that I love into something that is connected to William. And then you go, wait a second, William has special powers. So all of those ideas thread into each other and became this episode. I love hinting at one thing and the reality is different."

== Reception ==
"Ghouli" received very positive reviews from critics. On Rotten Tomatoes, it has an approval rating of 100% with an average rating of 7.3 out of 10 based on 7 reviews.

In its initial broadcast in the United States on January 31, 2018, it received 3.64 million viewers, which was down from the previous week, which had 3.87 million viewers.
