= One Son =

- The X-Files episode
- A Syndicate surgeon is revealed to be a faceless rebel. In the commentary for this episode, Frank Spotnitz cited this visual effect as one with which he was not pleased.
- Episode no.: Season 6 Episode 12
- Directed by: Rob Bowman
- Written by: Chris Carter; Frank Spotnitz
- Production code: 6ABX12
- Original air date: February 14, 1999
- Running time: 45 minutes

Guest appearances
- Mitch Pileggi as Walter Skinner; James Pickens, Jr. as Alvin Kersh; Chris Owens as Jeffrey Spender; Mimi Rogers as Diana Fowley; William B. Davis as The Smoking Man; Veronica Cartwright as Cassandra Spender; Peter Donat as William Mulder; Dean Haglund as Richard Langly; Bruce Harwood as John Fitzgerald Byers; Tom Braidwood as Melvin Frohike; Laurie Holden as Marita Covarrubias; Nicholas Lea as Alex Krycek; Don S. Williams as First Elder; John Moore as Third Elder; Al Ruscio as Fourth Elder; Frank Ertl as Fifth Elder; Scott Williamson as CDC Leader; Jo Black-Jacob as Nurse; Mark Bramhall as Surgical Team Member

Episode chronology
← Previous "Two Fathers"	Next → "Agua Mala"
- The X-Files season 6

"One Son" is the twelfth episode from the sixth season of the American science fiction television series The X-Files. It first aired on February 14, 1999, on the Fox network. The episode was written by series creator Chris Carter and Frank Spotnitz, and directed by Rob Bowman. It explores the series' overarching mythology and concludes the Syndicate story arc.

The series centers on FBI special agents Fox Mulder (David Duchovny) and Dana Scully (Gillian Anderson), who work on "X-Files"—cases deemed "unsolvable" by the FBI, usually dealing with the paranormal. Although Mulder is a believer in the paranormal, and the skeptical Scully has been assigned to debunk his work, the two have developed a deep friendship. While Cassandra Spender (Veronica Cartwright) reveals the truth about the alien conspiracy to take over the Earth to Mulder, the Smoking Man (William B. Davis) does the same to her son, Jeffrey Spender (Chris Owens), in an effort to convince him to work with the Syndicate. Even as Mulder is deceived by Special Agent Diana Fowley (Mimi Rogers), Scully stays true to the investigation, and the two find Spender to be a surprise ally. Meanwhile, the Syndicate reaches the climax of its plans, only to have its members systematically exterminated by the faceless alien rebels, who oppose colonization.

"One Son," a direct continuation of the previous episode "Two Fathers," was written, along with its predecessor, to eliminate the Syndicate and relaunch the series' mythology in a different direction. Both the opening of the episode and the climactic scene featuring the demise of the Syndicate were filmed at the Marine Corps Air Station Tustin in Tustin, California. Spotnitz was particularly critical of some of the visual effects used in the episode, expressing a desire to one day revisit and redo them. The episode has also been analyzed for its thematic examination of family. "One Son" earned a Nielsen household rating of 10.1, and its first broadcast was watched by 16.57 million people. The episode was well received by critics, who applauded the way the Syndicate's story arc was wrapped up, although others felt the resolution was too simplistic.

== Plot ==
=== Background ===
For the first five seasons of the series, FBI federal agents Fox Mulder (David Duchovny) and Dana Scully (Gillian Anderson) have unraveled a conspiracy that involves the mysterious Syndicate, and their plans to aid in the alien Colonists in their invasion of Earth. The fifth-season episodes "Patient X" and "The Red and the Black" reveal that, counter to the colonization effort, there is a faction of Alien Rebels opposed to colonization. In the previous episode, "Two Fathers", one of the Rebels tried to infiltrate the Syndicate and form an alliance, only to be killed.

=== Events ===
Cassandra Spender (Veronica Cartwright) demands that Mulder kill her, but before he can act, Diana Fowley (Mimi Rogers) quarantines Mulder, Cassandra, and Scully at a Centers for Disease Control facility. There, Marita Covarrubias (Laurie Holden) tells Mulder that Cassandra is a successful alien-human hybrid and that her existence will signal the Colonists to begin their invasion of Earth. Meanwhile, Alex Krycek (Nicholas Lea) informs the Syndicate that the Alien Rebels want Cassandra kept alive. The Syndicate instead decides to surrender her to the Colonists, thereby triggering colonization in exchange for their own survival.

At Fowley's apartment, The Smoking Man (William B. Davis) explains to Mulder that years earlier, the Syndicate had agreed to cooperate with the Colonists by surrendering family members as collateral in exchange for an alien fetus. The Syndicate were then tasked with using the fetus' DNA to create alien-human hybrids capable of surviving colonization. Now that a hybrid (i.e., Cassandra) has been created, the Syndicate plans to surrender her, triggering colonization. Smoking Man also tells Mulder that the exchange will take place at El Rico Air Force Base. Meanwhile, an Alien Rebel kills a Syndicate surgeon, assumes his form, and steals the alien fetus, thus allowing the Rebels to infiltrate the planned exchange.

As the Syndicate prepares to surrender Cassandra at the air base, Mulder and Scully unsuccessfully try to intercept her. However, before the exchange can proceed as planned, the Syndicate are ambushed by the Alien Rebels, who surround and immolate the Syndicate. Only the Smoking Man and Fowley escape. The next day, Mulder, Scully, Walter Skinner (Mitch Pileggi), and Jeffrey Spender (Chris Owens) report to Assistant Director Alvin Kersh (James Pickens, Jr.). Spender recommends that Mulder and Scully be reassigned to the X-Files. He later encounters the Smoking Man, his father, who berates him for not being like Mulder before shooting him in the head.

== Production ==
=== Conception and writing ===
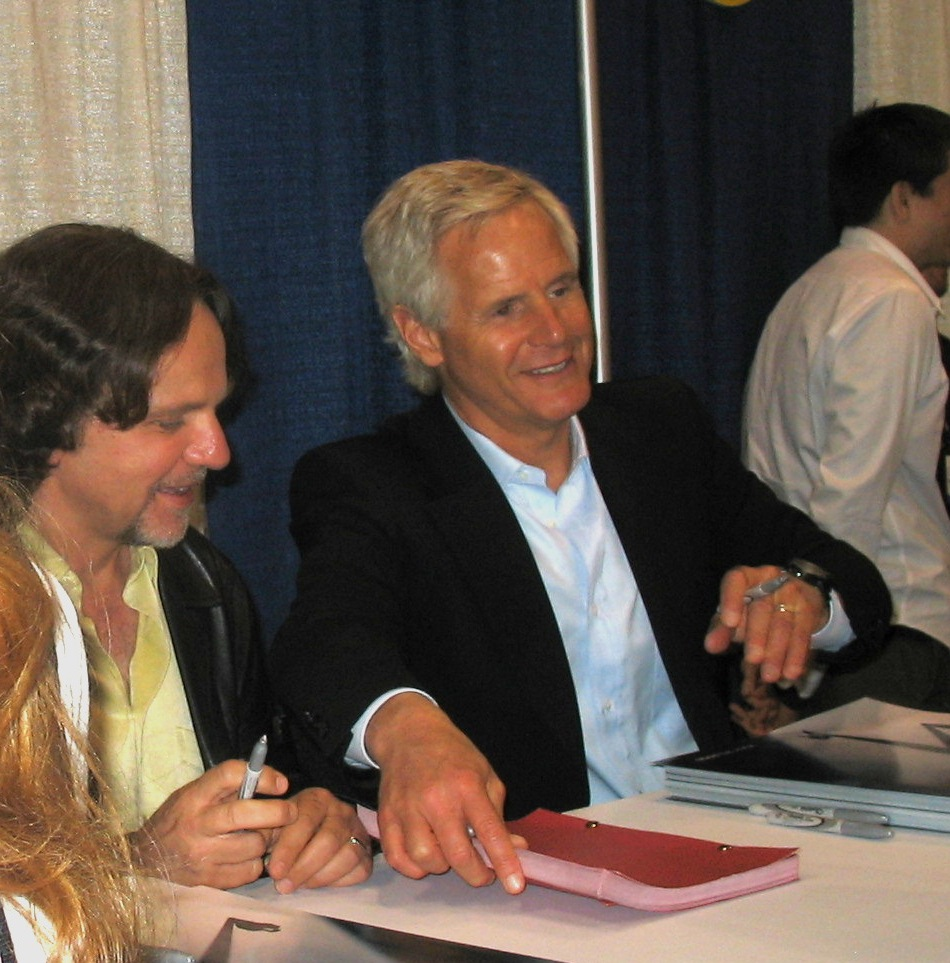
The episode was co-written by series creator Chris Carter (right) and Frank Spotnitz (left).

"One Son" concluded not only the story that had begun in the preceding episode, "Two Fathers", but also a large portion of the series' mythology, much of which had been centered around the Syndicate. The producers felt this was necessary as the Syndicate's story arc was becoming a "narrative drag" on the series, and that many questions from the past five seasons were still unanswered. Another impetus for finishing the arc was the belief of series creator and episode co-writer Chris Carter that the series would end by the spring of 2000. Thus "One Son" was written to resolve many of the show's arcs in preparation for a future series finale. The writing staff was also looking for ways to create a new story lines for the series, such as the "Super Soldiers" arc, which was created for the eighth and ninth seasons.

Carter also sought to rectify small issues that fans had with the 1998 feature film, The X-Files, explaining, "I think if there was any trouble with the movie, it was that we promised so much that we didn't deliver all of it. I think we wanted to deliver a lot, and all at once, in these two episodes". Episode co-writer Frank Spotnitz agreed, saying that when The X-Files film was being promoted with the tagline "The Truth is Revealed," he realized that many fans would be unhappy with the revelations. Spotnitz struggled when writing "One Son" because he believed that episodes that gave answers seemed to be less entertaining for viewers than episodes that presented new questions. He did, however, acknowledge that this episode was necessary to explain the show's mythology; he called the episode the "biggest chapter we had time to explore in the nine years we were on the air".

Writers for the series often struggled with writing "mytharc" episodes because there was a need to force as much material into them as possible, given their relative paucity compared to the "Monster of the week" episodes. While the title of the previous episode, "Two Fathers", referred to both Bill Mulder and The Smoking Man, this episode was titled "One Son" to reflect the fact that Mulder was the only remaining son of either of these men, after the presumed death of Jeffrey Spender.

Several of the plot elements self-reference other episodes of the series. Fort Marlene's presence is a reference to the first season finale "The Erlenmeyer Flask," in which the alien fetus was first introduced; the term "purity control" is also a reference to this episode. The references to MUFON were designed to recall the fourth-season story-arc involving Scully's cancer. The episode also references and mirrors elements of popular culture. Fowley's apartment was purposely located in the Watergate complex, a hotel notorious as the location of the 1970s Watergate scandal. The scenes featuring Mulder and Scully being decontaminated were based on a similar scene in the James Bond film Dr. No (1962), according to Spotnitz. He felt that the scene successfully played upon the sexual tension between the two lead characters.

=== Casting and filming ===
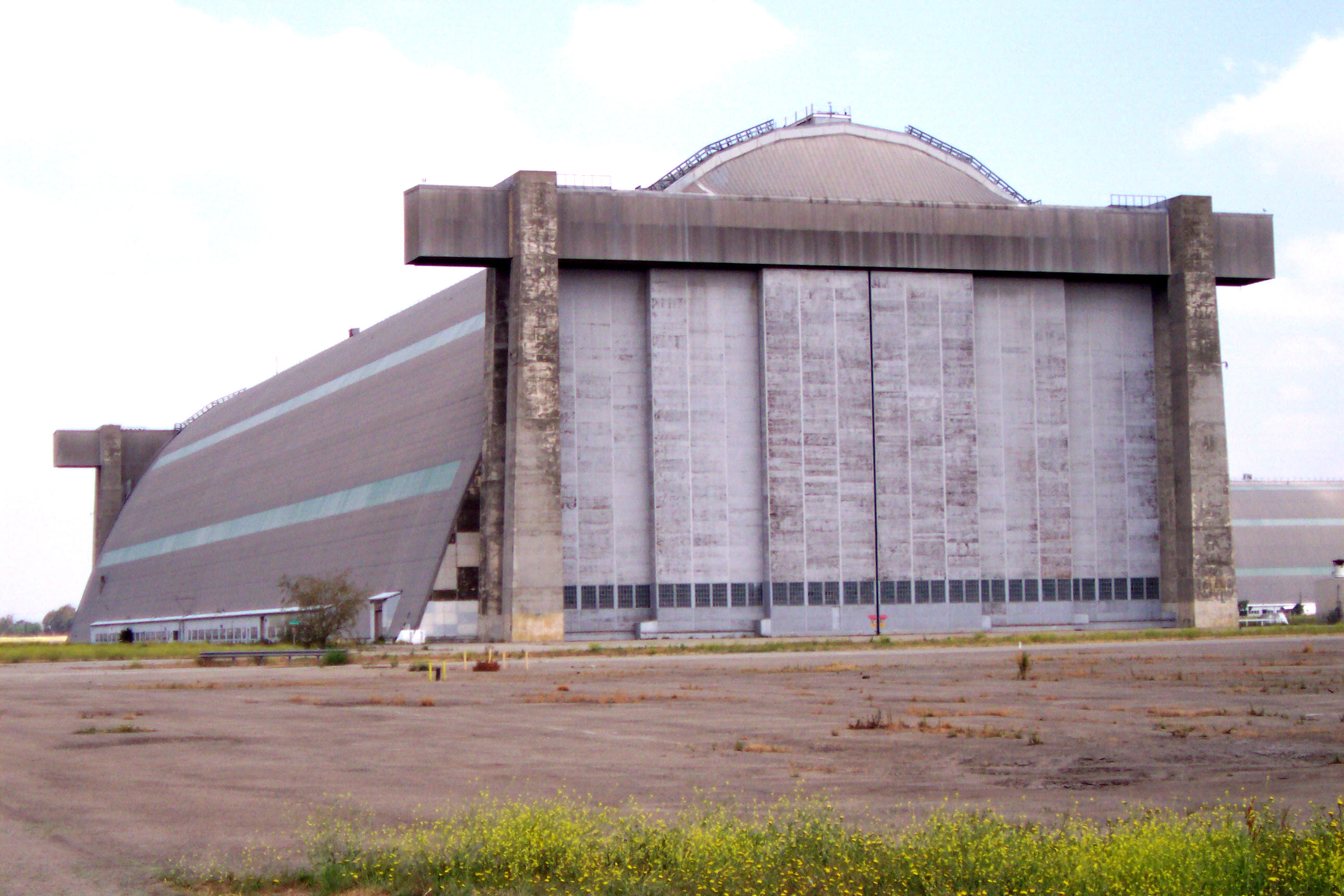
The climactic scene featuring the Syndicate being incinerated by the alien rebels took place at the Marine Corps Air Station Tustin.

"One Son" would be the last episode of the series to feature Owens' character, Jeffrey Spender, until the ninth season entry "William". Owens learned that he would be killed off when Carter told him, "You're going to go out a hero, of sorts". Owens was slightly disappointed, as he had just been introduced during the conclusion of the previous season. Davis was upset that Owens was leaving the series, and reportedly told Owens during their last scene together, "I don't want to shoot you! I enjoy working with you!" Owens, however, jokingly noted that Davis had no problems slapping him when the script called for it. In the episode, Laurie Holden, who played Marita Covarrubias, returns. Spotnitz crafted the sequence in which she confronts Mulder to be a way of "taking away [her] beauty and making her [look] as horrifying as possible". To accomplish this, she was given "terrible-looking" contact lenses and her hair was disheveled.

While the first five seasons of the series were mainly filmed in Vancouver, British Columbia, production of the show's sixth season was based in Los Angeles, California. The scenes taking place in the hangar were filmed at the Marine Corps Air Station Tustin in Tustin, California. The hangar—constructed in 1942 in support of the United States Navy coastal patrol efforts during World War II—is one of the largest all-wooden hangars in the United States. Bill Roe, director of photography, and Rob Bowman were tasked with lighting the entire structure for the episode's teaser and climax, a job that Spotnitz later called "amazing". Because the series' move to Los Angeles had caused production costs to rise, the show was forced to cut down on its "astonishing production values". However, Spotnitz highlighted the use of the hangar as "was a way to try and create that cinematic scale and still keep [the show] affordable". Initially, the production staff had hoped to show the alien rebels incinerating the Syndicate on screen. However, because they were filming in an all-wooden hangar, the use of fire was not an option.

The episode also revisits trains as a setting, something that had previously been done in the third season episodes "731" and "Nisei". However, for budgetary reasons, the scenes taking place on the trains did not take up much screen time. To give the effect that the train carrying Cassandra Spender is moving at a high speed, Manners utilized "sound effects, music, clever camera angles and quick cutting". In reality, the train was going a little under ten miles an hour.

All of the sets in the episode were created by Corey Kaplan. Roe, meanwhile, was in charge of the cinematography. While Spotnitz was complimentary towards Rob Bowman's directing, he was critical of the scene in which one of the Syndicate members morphs into an alien rebel. He felt that the effect was subpar, largely because it had been created on such short notice. He explained, "It was one of those cases where you just run out of time, sorry to say". He later expressed a desire to one day go back and revisit the effect.

The episode required extensive demands from makeup department head Cheri Montesanto-Medcalf. She was tasked with creating the illusion of the lead surgeon's head being frozen in liquid nitrogen, as well as "de-aging" members of the Syndicate for the episode's flashback sequences. To create the former, Montesanta-Medcalf painted the actor's face blue, then attached silicone icicles to his head.

== Themes ==
The episode emphasizes the importance of family. Meghan Deans of Tor.com wrote that the Syndicate handing over their family and loved ones to save the world was evidence of this permeating theme. She also highlighted the duality of fathers and sons. The Smoking Man is both a father to Mulder and Spender, but he favors Mulder. At the same time, both Spender and Krycek vie for the position of "son," with the former falling from The Smoking Man's grace, and the latter playing the role of "prodigal son". However, both Spender and Krycek eventually fail, leaving Mulder as the titular "one son". Neal Justin of the Star Tribune also wrote about the episode's emphasis on family, commenting that "it is interesting to note that the core of the story appears to be the relationship between parents and their children". He compared the episode's thematic mechanism to the same concern of the Star Wars films.

== Reception ==
=== Ratings and accolades ===
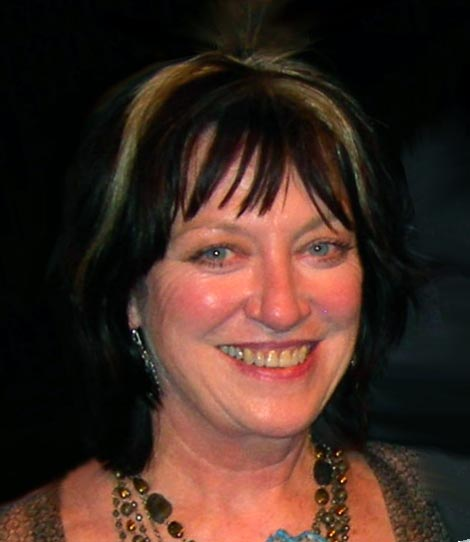
Veronica Cartwright's performance in the episode resulted in an Emmy nomination.

"One Son" originally aired in the United States on the Fox network on February 14, 1999. In the U.S., the episode was watched by 16.57 million viewers. It earned a Nielsen household rating of 10.1, with a 16 share. Nielsen ratings are audience measurement systems that determine the audience size and composition of television programming in the U.S. This means that roughly 10.1 percent of all television-equipped households, and 16 percent of households watching television, were watching the episode.

Cartwright was nominated for an Emmy for "Outstanding Guest Actress in a Drama Series" for her role in both this episode and "Two Fathers". "One Son" was also nominated for "Outstanding Art Direction—Series", and "One Son" and "Two Fathers" were co-nominated for "Outstanding Makeup—Series". The series won an Emmy for the latter. On November 5, 2002, the episode was released on DVD as part of the complete sixth season. The episode was later included on The X-Files Mythology, Volume 3 – Colonization, a DVD collection that features episodes involved with the alien colonists' plans to take over the Earth.

=== Reviews ===
Because the episode was promoted with the promise of answering questions, it caused increased media speculation. With the conclusion of "One Son", many critics applauded the way the series was able to wrap up the Syndicate arc. A.M. Jamison of the Dayton Daily News wrote that "'One Son' ends dramatically, drawing to a close one quest and opening a new set of challenges not only for Mulder but the Earth as well". Noel Holston and Justin of the Star Tribune awarded the episode four stars out of five, noting that it answered even more questions than "Two Fathers". They also applauded the familial bonds that held the episode together. However, some critics felt that the answers were slightly rushed. Manuel Mendoza of The Dallas Morning News wrote that "Mr. Carter and his co-writer Frank Spotnitz have a wonderfully indirect way of setting up dramatic situations and an unbelievably shorthand way of resolving them".

Robert Shearman, in his book Wanting to Believe: A Critical Guide to The X-Files, Millennium & The Lone Gunmen, rated the episode three-and-a-half stars out of five. The author enjoyed Davis' performance, noting that he gave the role "real power", and that he was "the emotional centre of the episode". While critical about the amount of attention Fowley's allegiance received, Shearman ultimately felt that the episode "reaches for both significance and closure, and mostly works". Deans wrote that "One Son," along with "Two Fathers," is elevated above a "mytharc infodump" because of "its use of family, a theme woven deep and clear throughout". She largely applauded the episode's exploration of the various characters, and its central motif, noting that "the conspiracy [the Syndicate] is no longer the threat now. It's the rebels and the colonists, fearful and unknown. Just like family". Tom Kessenich, in his book Examination: An Unauthorized Look at Seasons 6–9 of the X-Files wrote positively of the episode, saying "The 'Two Fathers'/'One Son' was extremely powerful stuff. Tightly written, beautifully filmed and filled with more affirmations than revelations, but fascination looks at the characters in the drama".

Zack Handlen of The A.V. Club awarded the episode a "B" rating. He felt that the episode worked extremely well on a visual and character-based level. Handlen felt that, because the show was "often scariest when it's implying, rather than flat out stating," its "mythology only really works as something just out of sight". For this reason, he felt that the episode mixed "the compelling with the absurd" with "mixed results". Handlen concluded that the episode "has its moment," but is ultimately hurt by the fact that it refuses "to come to any serious conclusions," as well as "the inherent limitations of the [episode's] form". Not all reviews were glowing. Paula Vitaris from Cinefantastique gave the episode a negative review and awarded it one-and-a-half stars out of four. Vitaris criticized the death scene of the Syndicate, noting that it was "clumsily contrived, allowing [The Smoking Man] and Fowley to escape, but not because it makes sense, but because the show needs them to return at some point".

Since its airing, "One Son" has been called one of the best episodes of The X-Files. Joyce Millman from Salon magazine said the episode, along with "Two Fathers," was one "of the most coherent, [...] almost unbearably tense, hours in the series' run". She said that the episode gave some long-waited answers, but created new questions, such as what has really happened to Samantha Mulder. Michigan Daily reviewer Melissa Runstrom said that "One Son," along with "Two Fathers" and season finale "Biogenesis," were the highlights of the sixth season. Earl Cressey from DVD Talk also named "One Son," along with "Two Fathers," as one of the "highlights of season six".
