= Theef =

- The X-Files episode
- Episode no.: Season 7 Episode 14
- Directed by: Kim Manners
- Written by: Vince Gilligan; John Shiban; Frank Spotnitz
- Production code: 7ABX14
- Original air date: March 12, 2000
- Running time: 44 minutes

Guest appearances
- Billy Drago as Orell Peattie; James Morrison as Dr. Robert Wieder; Kate McNeil as Nan Wieder; Cara Jedell as Lucy Wieder; Tom Dahlgren as Dr. Irving Thalbro; Sage Allen as Landlady; Pamela Gordon as Proprietor; Matthew Sutherland as Records Clerk; Dylan Kussman as Med Student; Michael Sidney as Security Guard; Aaron Braxton as Radiology Tech; Leah Sanders as Reporter #1; Mark Thompson as Reporter #2

Episode chronology
← Previous "First Person Shooter"	Next → "En Ami"
- The X-Files season 7

"Theef" is the fourteenth episode of the seventh season of the science fiction television series The X-Files. It premiered on the Fox network in the United States on March 12, 2000. It was written by Vince Gilligan, John Shiban, and Frank Spotnitz and directed by Kim Manners. The episode is a Monster-of-the-Week" story, unconnected to the series' wider mythology. "Theef" earned a Nielsen household rating of 7.4, being watched by 11.91 million people in its initial broadcast. The episode received mixed to positive reviews from critics.

The show centers on FBI special agents Fox Mulder (David Duchovny) and Dana Scully (Gillian Anderson) who work on cases linked to the paranormal, called X-Files. Mulder is a believer in the paranormal, while the skeptical Scully has been assigned to debunk his work. In this episode, Mulder and Scully investigate the murder of a prominent doctor's father-in-law, who was found with the word "theef" written on the wall in blood. After a string of follow-up accidents, Mulder suspects hexcraft may be the source of threats against the doctor's family.

"Theef" was written in a short period during the show's Christmas break after another script was dropped by the series. The main concept of the episode was "modern medicine versus backyards supernatural arts". The episode featured several noted actors, including Billy Drago, who played the role of antagonist Orell Peattie, and James Morrison, who was a former cast member of the science fiction series Space: Above and Beyond, which was created by former X-Files writers Glen Morgan and James Wong. Series creator Chris Carter later called the episode "very well cast".

== Plot ==
Dr. Irving Thalbro is staying with his daughter and her family in Marin County, California, including her husband, Dr. Robert Wieder (James Morrison). During the night, Irving finds a man-shaped pile of dirt in his bed. Robert later discovers Irving hanging from the ceiling, with the word "theef" painted in his blood on the wall.

FBI Agents Fox Mulder (David Duchovny) and Dana Scully (Gillian Anderson) are subsequently called into investigate. Mulder finds graveyard dirt in Irving's bed and suspects a hoodoo hex; Scully, on the other hand believes Irving committed suicide. However, an autopsy reveals he suffered from kuru, a prion disease not previously found in the United States. Meanwhile, a man named Orell Peattie (Billy Drago) uses photographs of the Wieder family to create poppet dolls. Soon thereafter, Mrs. Wieder develops severe Leishmaniasis lesions. She is later burned to death during an MRI, with "theef" branded into her chest.

Peattie visits Robert but refuses to explain his attacks. Robert then discovers a bracelet in a Jane Doe file that may be related to the events his family is experiencing. The agents later identify Jane Doe as Lynnette Peattie, a West Virginian who been mortally wounded in a bus crash. It is revealed that when Lynnette was brought to the hospital after the crash, she was treated by Wieder; recognizing that her wounds, he therefore euthanized her by giving her an overdose of morphine. Mulder concludes that Peattie is her father and, believing Robert stole his family from him, is hexing the Wieder family out of revenge. Hoping to weaken Peattie's magical abilities by transporting his daughter's corpse to Virginia, Mulder exhumes Lynnette's grave, only to find the casket empty.

Peattie's landlady discovers Lynnette's body in his apartment and immediately contracts a flesh-eating disease. Peattie also targets Scully, placing nails into the eyes of her poppet and causing her to go blind. Peattie then breaks into the Wieder home and attacks the doctor with another doll. At that moment, Mulder arrives and removes the nails from Scully's doll, restoring her sight and allowing her to shoot Peattie. He falls into a coma, while Lynnette's body is returned to West Virginia.

== Production ==
The episode was inspired by Voodoo and "backyards supernatural arts".

=== Writing ===
The script for "Theef" was written by Frank Spotnitz, John Shiban, and Vince Gilligan during the production crew's Christmas break after a previous script was scrapped at the last minute. After mulling over options, the three decided to craft a story about "modern medicine versus backyards supernatural arts". Gilligan later joked that "I think I was enlisted for the fact that I'm Southern, and they thought I was the closest thing they had to a hillbilly on the staff".

Producer David Amann explained that the inspiration for the story was the question, "What if you have a doctor who is prosperous but has a dark page from his past that comes back to haunt him?" Spotnitz later elaborated that the story initially was "going to be how do you get rid of something you can't get rid of". However, the writers soon found this storyline difficult to develop, and, by Spotnitz's own admission, the story "started to evolve into a Cape Fear type of situation". The episode's script was finalized by the writers in December 1999 and Kim Manners was selected as the episode's director.

=== Casting, directing, and makeup ===
According to series creator Chris Carter, the episode "was very well cast". Actor Billy Drago was cast as Orell Peattie, a decision that Carter later called "especially lucky". His son, Darren E. Burrows, had previously been cast as Bernard in a sixth-season episode, "Monday." The actor who played Dr. Wieder, James Morrison, was a former cast member of the science fiction series Space: Above and Beyond, and had previously been cast as detective Jim Horn in an episode of Millennium called "Dead Letters". Morrison would later get acclaim as Bill Buchanan on the future Fox series 24. Actress Leah Sanders was a childhood friend of John Shiban who had not been in contact for 20 years. When she was coincidentally cast as a background character, Shiban was reportedly delighted.

Kim Manners found "Theef" was difficult to shoot because the cast and crew had inadequate time to prepare. He explained, "It was kind of a rush thing and we got the script very late. We were totally winging it while we were shooting it". In Manners's opinion, the entire episode only "came together" during post-production editing: "When I looked at the footage, it was like I was looking at somebody else's film. But it cut together real nice and the end result was that 'Theef' turned out to be a decent little episode". Manners later admitted that the episode was his only credit for the series during which he experienced illness. With Manners out for a day due to his sickness, Rob Bowman took over directing duties for a day.

Cheri Montesanto-Medcalf, one of the show's makeup creators, was extremely pleased with Drago's makeup in the episode. She later noted, "I remember Billy Drago was awesome–he looked so creepy after makeup. I just wanted this guy to look super-creepy and disturbing to look at, but real enough that you might be scared if you looked out your window at night and saw him standing there".

== Broadcast and reception ==
"Theef" first aired in the United States on March 12, 2000. This episode earned a Nielsen rating of 7.4, with an 11 share, meaning that roughly 7.4 percent of all television-equipped households, and 11 percent of households watching television, were tuned in to the episode. It was viewed by 11.91 million viewers. The episode aired in the United Kingdom and Ireland on Sky1 on June 18, 2000 and received 0.71 million viewers, making it the third most watched episode that week. The episode was nominated and won a 2000 Emmy Award by the Academy of Television Arts & Sciences for Outstanding Makeup for a Series.

Emily St. James of The A.V. Club awarded the episode a "B+", and called it "the strongest straight-up, non-experimental standalone the season’s had so far," as well as one of "the strongest 'scary' episode since season five." She praised the guest cast—most notably Drago and Morrison—and wrote that the writers of the episode were able to successfully make the character deaths in the episode count in a way that moved the audience. St. James's main criticism of the episode was that it painted Peattie "as a backwoods hick and a rather broad stereotype of one." Tom Kessenich, in his book Examinations, gave the episode a moderately positive review. Despite slightly criticizing the episode utilizing a voodoo-based plot, which he called "[not] terribly original", he concluded that "there's nothing wrong with a little modern medicine vs. practical magic confrontation. And I definitely enjoyed how Scully had her envelope pushed once again". Rich Rosell from Digitally Obsessed awarded the episode 4 out of 5 stars, noting, "writer Vince Gilligan gets fairly serious in this ep concerning a series of deadly hexes cast upon a doctor and his family, as well as some cryptic scrawlings. There's plenty of bad mojo going around as the X-Files team gets to dig deep into the dark side of the magick arts, with Scully at one point losing her sight, thanks to a vengeful hex doll. Spooky". TV Guide later named the episode's main antagonist, Orell Peattie, as one of "The Scariest X-Files Monsters". Paula Vitaris from Cinefantastique gave the episode a moderately mixed review and awarded it two-and-a-half stars out of four. She concluded that "although 'Theef' is burdened with some illogical plot developments and some underdeveloped characterization, overall it is a decent installment of The X-Files".

Several other reviews were more mixed. Kenneth Silber from Space.com was critical of the episode, noting that the main antagonist is "a veritable caricature of backwoods stupidity and thus hard to take seriously". He did, however, compliment the sympathetic qualities of Dr. Wieder and his family. Robert Shearman, in his book Wanting to Believe: A Critical Guide to The X-Files, Millennium & The Lone Gunmen, rated the episode two-and-a-half stars out of five, noting that the episode was "just too unambitious an X-File to be anything more than a collection of moments, only some of which work".

== Bibliography ==
- Hurwitz, Matt; Knowles, Chris (2008). The Complete X-Files. Insight Editions. ISBN 978-1-933784-80-9.
- Kessenich, Tom (2002). Examination: An Unauthorized Look at Seasons 6–9 of the X-Files. Trafford Publishing. ISBN 1-55369-812-6.
- Meisler, Andy (2000). The End and the Beginning: The Official Guide to the X-Files Season 6. HarperCollins. ISBN 0-06-107595-7.
- Shapiro, Marc (2000). All Things: The Official Guide to the X-Files Volume 6. Harper Prism. ISBN 0-06-107611-2.
- Shearman, Robert (2009). Wanting to Believe: A Critical Guide to The X-Files, Millennium & The Lone Gunmen. Mad Norwegian Press. ISBN 978-0-9759446-9-1.
