= My Struggle IV =

- The X-Files episode
- Episode no.: Season 11; Episode 10
- Directed by: Chris Carter
- Written by: Chris Carter
- Production code: 2AYW10
- Original air date: March 21, 2018
- Running time: 43 minutes

Guest appearances
- William B. Davis as Cigarette Smoking Man; Miles Robbins as William/Jackson Van De Kamp; Annabeth Gish as Monica Reyes; James Pickens Jr. as Alvin Kersh; Joel McHale as Tad O'Malley; Barbara Hershey as Erika Price; AC Peterson as Mr. Y; Sarah Jeffery as Brianna Stapleton; Madeleine Arthur as Sarah Arthur; West Duchovny as Maddy

Episode chronology
← Previous "Nothing Lasts Forever"	Next → —
- The X-Files season 11

"My Struggle IV" is the tenth episode of the eleventh season and the series finale of the American science fiction television series The X-Files. The episode was written and directed by Chris Carter. It aired on March 21, 2018, on Fox. The tagline for this episode is "Salvator Mundi".

The show centers on FBI special agents who work on unsolved paranormal cases called X-Files; focusing on the investigations of Fox Mulder (David Duchovny), and Dana Scully (Gillian Anderson) after their reinstatement in the FBI. In this episode, Mulder and Scully rush to find an on-the-run William, while the Cigarette Smoking Man pushes forward with his ultimate plan.

== Plot ==
Following the events of "Ghouli", William has become a fugitive from government agents as he is pivotal to the Cigarette Smoking Man's plans. He resolves to find the Smoking Man to learn the truth about his nature.

Mulder and Scully receive a call from Monica Reyes, warning them that William has been taken into custody and is being escorted to a government warehouse in Maryland. Scully, who has been struggling with illness and visions of the future by way of her psychic link with William, predicts that he will not be there. Mulder infiltrates the building but is forced to kill the agents and Mr. Y before he can question them and he finds no trace of William.

Scully identifies a cluster of lottery winners in Tennessee, which she believes is a side-effect of William's presence. Mulder picks up the trail but is followed by a government agent. He quits in frustration and anticipates that William is heading for Norfolk. Meanwhile, William is picked up by the agent following Mulder.

With the help of Sarah Turner and Brianna Stapleton—the two girls at the center of the "Ghouli" episode—and Sarah's friend Maddy, Mulder locates William in Norfolk. He convinces William to talk to him as a unit of soldiers, led by Erika Price, locate the agent's car. The agent is dead, having been torn apart by William. Price's unit descends on William's hotel room and attempts to arrest him. William turns his powers on them, causing them to explode. He nearly loses control and kills Mulder but regains his composure and flees.

In a bid to buy Mulder more time, Scully contacts right-wing online webcaster Tad O'Malley and claims that the incident at the hotel was part of the project to release a man-made pathogen developed from an alien virus. Mulder is named as the source for the story, prompting Director Kersh to order Walter Skinner to shut down the X-Files and to dismiss Mulder and Scully from duty. Scully receives a vision of Mulder's death and pleads with Skinner to help her save him.

Mulder follows William to an abandoned factory on the coast. Scully arrives, and Mulder suggests that they give up trying to find William. Scully refuses to back down, pressing Mulder for details when the real Mulder arrives; the Mulder Scully spoke to was William in disguise. As the two chase him through the factory, Skinner realizes that they have been followed by Reyes and the Cigarette Smoking Man. The Cigarette Smoking Man forces the car to run Skinner down. Skinner shoots at the car and kills Reyes. He then attempts to outrun the car, but dives underneath Monica's vehicle as it runs over his leg and collides with another car.

The Cigarette Smoking Man confronts Mulder on the waterfront. Mulder taunts him, and the Smoking Man shoots him in the head and he falls into the water, mirroring Scully's vision of Mulder's death. The real Mulder appears, shooting the Cigarette Smoking Man, who realizes that he has shot William (disguised as Mulder) as he ultimately falls into the water, and his body is carried away.

In the aftermath, Mulder and Scully comfort one another. Scully reveals that William was not their child but an experiment created by the Smoking Man and implanted into her. Mulder struggles with the knowledge until Scully reveals that she is pregnant with his child, a seeming impossibility. As the two embrace, William resurfaces from the water elsewhere, alive.

== Production ==
=== Filming ===
Filming for the season began in August 2017 in Vancouver, British Columbia, where the previous season was filmed, along with the show's original first five seasons. The episode wrapped on December 22, 2017. The episode was directed by Chris Carter.

=== Writing ===
The episode was written by Chris Carter. He explained his reason for a four part mythology arc in this interview with TVInsider:

"There really are four quarters of a whole. And I think that maybe threw some people at the beginning of last season, and even at the end of last season. But I think that you see, as you have seen, that they were puzzle pieces, four puzzle pieces to a circle. I wanted to tell Mulder's (David Duchovny) story—Mulder's struggle. I wanted to tell Scully's (Gillian Anderson) struggle. I wanted to tell the Cigarette Smoking Man's (William B. Davis) struggle, and I wanted to tell William's (Miles Robbins) struggle. For me, the four characters who are central to the mythology."

When asked about the possibility of a twelfth season, Carter said there are still more files to be uncovered "in those drawers in Mulder's office." Carter says, "the truth is always out there, and it's open to be being explored." Still, he stated that he was satisfied about this episode being the series finale.

== Reception ==
=== Critical reception ===
"My Struggle IV" received generally negative reviews from critics. On Rotten Tomatoes, it has an approval rating of 31% with an average rating of 5.49 out of 10 based on 13 reviews. The site's critical consensus reads, "'My Struggle IV' ends the season – and possibly the series – on a sour note void of actor chemistry, a gratifying conclusion, or any kind of fitting farewell to The X-Files' leading lady."

=== Ratings ===
In its initial broadcast in the United States on March 21, 2018, it received 3.43 million viewers, which was an increase from the previous episode, which had 3.01 million viewers.
