= The Lost Art of Forehead Sweat =

- The X-Files episode
- Episode no.: Season 11; Episode 4
- Directed by: Darin Morgan
- Written by: Darin Morgan
- Production code: 2AYW04
- Original air date: January 24, 2018
- Running time: 43 minutes

Guest appearances
- Brian Huskey as Reginald Murgatroid; Stuart Margolin as Dr. They

Episode chronology
← Previous "Plus One"	Next → "Ghouli"
- The X-Files season 11

"The Lost Art of Forehead Sweat" is the fourth episode of the eleventh season of the American science fiction television series The X-Files. The episode was written and directed by Darin Morgan. The episode is a "Monster of the Week" story, unconnected to the series' wider mythology.

The episode focuses on the Mandela Effect and is a self-parody of the show and recurring events.

== Plot ==
A pre-credits black and white sequence appears to show the climactic scene of an episode of The Twilight Zone, in which a man in a late-night café reveals his fears that Martians are invading Earth while disguised as human beings. When the waiter points the man to a mirror, the man is shocked to see that he himself is a Martian, and that the waiter is the Devil.

In an underground garage, Mulder meets a man named Reggie who claims to know him. The man tells Mulder that someone is trying to erase him from society; to prove his point, he refers to Mulder's childhood memory of watching "The Lost Martian". Mulder goes home and digs through his Twilight Zone collection, only to come up empty handed even though he has a memory of the episode. Dana Scully later matches his disbelief when Reggie (now going by the last name "Something") gives her a container of a cherry-flavored Jell-O rip off brand called Goop-O A-B-C, which she remembers from her childhood.

Mulder and Scully, and eventually Reggie, argue over whether these events are an example of the Mandela Effect, in which history is seemingly rewritten by collective acceptance of erroneous facts (Reggie refers to it as the Mengele Effect). Reggie frantically rants that "they" are trying to erase memory. When Mulder explains that conspiracy theorists often use a vaguely defined "they" to give "intentionality" to random events, Reggie explains that "They" is actually the name of a scientist who has learned how to shape collective memory. Reggie shows Scully and Mulder an online video detailing the life of Dr. Thaddeus They, who first learned how to manipulate memory while working at NASA, then perfected his techniques while working at "The United States Hospital" in Grenada. Now in the private sector, They applies his knowledge in cases ranging from corporate products liability to Holocaust denial. Reggie then admits that he had been in Grenada prior to the US invasion of that island, and observed the alien survivor of a crashed spaceship being taken from the hospital by the American military. Reggie then shockingly reveals that his experiences led him to join the FBI and start the X-Files, and that despite their lack of any memory of him, Reggie had actually been Scully's and Mulder's partner from the beginning, and was there on the day in 1993 when Dr. Dana Scully arrived in Mulder's basement office. (A montage is shown of the most memorable scenes of the series, now showing Reggie as being present.) Before Reggie can reveal anything more, two men, possibly henchmen of They, appear and chase Reggie from the garage.

Still skeptical, Mulder is then surprised to receive a call from They himself, who not only meets with Mulder but does so in an obvious public place. When first meeting Mulder, Dr. They ominously says "you're dead," quickly admitting that he means Mulder's purpose via the X-Files and chasing down conspiracies is dead, because the truth does not matter. Despite Mulder's insistence in the existence of an objective truth, They cheerfully explains that in the current era the truth does not matter because "you believe what you want to believe—that's what everybody does now anyway."

Reggie is revealed to be a longtime US government employee turned mental-ward patient named Reggie Murgatroid. In a montage of scenes apparently filmed in the same office, it is revealed that his career has included: Manually sorting mail for the Postal Service, working IRS forms longhand, sleeping through a stint as a fraud detection officer at the SEC, constructing new identities for criminals at the United States Federal Witness Protection Program, waterboarding a prisoner for the CIA, and remotely piloting weaponized drones for the Pentagon (celebrating a hit by saying "Boom goes the dynamite", only to anxiously exclaim "Wait, is that a wedding cake? Dammit! Not again!"). In his final position at the NSA, it is revealed Reggie used his position to eavesdrop on Mulder and Scully's telephone conversations. Reggie suffered a nervous breakdown, probably the result of torment he suffered on realizing that his many years of service to the country he loved were spent on tasks that betrayed that country's ideals. An ambulance from the Spotnitz Sanitarium arrives to take Reggie back.

Sympathizing with Reggie, Mulder asks him about his last X-Files case. While on a stretcher, Reggie recounts their last X-Files case together: an encounter with a Trump-like alien of the same race as that that had been found years earlier in Grenada. The alien, representing the "Intergalactic Union of Sentient Beings from All Known Universes and Beyond" tells the trio that his organization no longer wants to have anything to do with Earth, which he says, "isn't sending us your best people". So that there are no hard feelings, the alien does leave them a book which has the answers to any questions they might have about anything. The alien then leaves, wishing them a less-than-fond goodbye and good riddance. Mulder, distraught with the idea of there being no more answers to seek, breaks down into a childish tantrum as Reggie and Scully embrace.

In the present, as Reggie's ambulance is leaving, Skinner witnesses this, and asks Mulder and Scully "Where the hell are they taking Reggie?", much to Mulder and Scully's surprise.

Back at Mulder's house, Mulder and Scully watch "The Lost Martian", after Mulder realizes that it was a real episode from a cheap Twilight Zone knockoff show called Dusky Realm. Scully serves some Goop-O made in Mulder's mold of Sasquatch's foot. She then decides not to eat it after all, telling Mulder "I want to remember how it all was".

== Production ==
The episode guest stars Brian Huskey as Reggie, whose casting was revealed in September 2017 via Gillian Anderson's Twitter account. The episode features a montage of clips from past episodes, which insert Reggie into them; episodes featured included "Pilot", "Tooms", "Clyde Bruckman's Final Repose", "Teso Dos Bichos", "Home", "Small Potatoes", and "Unusual Suspects". The character of Reggie was previously briefly introduced in the second episode of the season, "This", when he appears in the digitized X-Files database. Regarding what clips to use, writer and director Darin Morgan commented:

I thought I was going to be using different episodes or scenes, but then when I went back and looked at those things, there was no place to put Reggie. They were all tight close-ups, usually Mulder and Scully. That was all sort of last-minute, that was the last thing I wrote in the script. It was like 3 in the morning. I was watching like DVD episodes and sort of fast-forwarding through them. 'No, he could fit in there.' I tried to pick episodes that at least bigger fans of the show would remember, and I think the ones that I picked most people know.

The episode features several other Easter eggs and references, including references to the TV shows The Twilight Zone and The Outer Limits, and the movie Kazaam, which is a popular example of the Mandela effect. The name of the mental institution, Spotnitz Sanitarium, is a reference to former X-Files writer Frank Spotnitz.

The scene featuring Mulder and Dr. They was filmed at the A-maze-ing Laughter art installation park in Vancouver. The unusually prominent use of a Canadian landmark, despite the narrative setting of the USA, has been interpreted as part of the episode's deconstruction of the series' reality.

== Reception ==
"The Lost Art of Forehead Sweat" received very positive reviews from critics. On Rotten Tomatoes, it has an approval rating of 100% with an average rating of 9.34 out of 10 based on 10 reviews.

In its initial broadcast in the United States on January 24, 2018, it received 3.87 million viewers, which was slightly down from the previous week, which had 3.95 million viewers. When taking into account the Live +7 ratings for the week of January 22–28, it received 5.62 million viewers.

== See also ==
- "Will the Real Martian Please Stand Up?", a 1961 Twilight Zone episode about two aliens in a diner
