= Plus One (The X-Files) =

- The X-Files episode
- Episode no.: Season 11; Episode 3
- Directed by: Kevin Hooks
- Written by: Chris Carter
- Production code: 2AYW03
- Original air date: January 17, 2018
- Running time: 43 minutes

Guest appearances
- Karin Konoval as Little Judy Poundstone and Little Chucky Poundstone

Episode chronology
← Previous "This"	Next → "The Lost Art of Forehead Sweat"
- The X-Files season 11

"Plus One" is the third episode of the eleventh season of the American science fiction television series The X-Files. The episode was written by Chris Carter and directed by Kevin Hooks. It aired on January 17, 2018, on Fox. The traditional tagline, "The Truth is Out There" is displayed twice. The cold open features the song "Unsaid Undone" from David Duchovny's debut album Hell or Highwater. This episode functions as a Monster of the Week style plot meaning that it has no ties to series ongoing Mythology.

== Plot ==
In a small rural community event in Virginia, Arkie Seavers appears to see himself in the back of the crowd. Frightened, he drives away from the event, only to have his doppelgänger grab the wheel and drive him into a tree.

Fox Mulder (David Duchovny) ties the Seavers case to a number of people who have tried to kill themselves after claiming they saw someone who looked exactly like them. Dana Scully (Gillian Anderson) thinks Arkie is lying, but Mulder is more inclined to believe. The agents meet with a barely-alive Seavers and discuss his experiences. The agents meet a patient at a psychiatric hospital named Judy Poundstone (Karin Konoval), who has dissociative identity disorder. Her room is filled with games of hangman, which she claims she plays with her brother, Chucky, who lives across town.

After being placed into a cell, Arkie's doppelgänger appears in the cell with him, presumably killing him. Mulder and Scully check into a motel to sleep for the night. He comes to her in the middle of the night to reveal Arkie’s death. Scully argues that it is a suicide, while Mulder and Seavers' attorney, Dean Cavalier, do not believe so. Mulder finds the irascible Chucky, living by himself, with his walls also covered with hangman games. Meanwhile, Scully meets with “Demon Judy” (also Konoval), an evil alter ego, who seems to be flinging chocolate pudding at the cell door. A nurse tells Scully that both of the Poundstone parents hanged themselves. Scully tries to get more information out of Judy, but is tormented by this new nemesis by taunts of her supposedly not being young enough to bear children anymore.

Chucky and Judy begin playing the game again, this time targeting Cavalier. First, Dean sees his double and goes to tell Scully and Mulder. The agents tell him to stay calm and hide away all weapons of harm. Dean ventures to his home and tosses multiple equipment onto the floor. He realizes that the room is filled with swords. Dean accidentally cuts himself with one of the blades. Before he can aid his wound, he sees his double again. The agents arrive to find Cavalier with his head cut off.

Back at the motel, Scully has trouble sleeping wondering if Judy had a point about her advancing age and seeks comfort from Mulder, which turns physically romantic. After their intimacy, Mulder sees his double in the bathroom and freaks out. Mulder races to confront Chucky as Scully goes to stop Judy. On her way to the hospital, Scully sees her double in the backseat of her car, but stays calm, calling the figure a "manifest psychic ideation." It turns out that the twins are fighting each other, not being able to agree on which agent to hang. Before the agents can interrupt their game, the siblings both "hang" each other. On Chucky's wall, Mulder finds two hangman games for "Mom" and "Dad."

== Production ==
=== Filming ===
Filming for the season began in August 2017 in Vancouver, British Columbia, where the previous season was filmed, along with the show's original five seasons. The episode was directed by Kevin Hooks, which marked his X-Files directorial debut. In an interview, Hooks commented regarding not getting to direct for the original series, "I feel like I had missed something very significant and when it came back, I was really excited about that". He continued, saying, "Chris [Carter] reached out to me and asked if I'd be interested in doing the show. I thought it's not every day that you get the creator of the show to call you on the phone and ask you to be a part of it."

=== Casting ===
The episode includes main cast members David Duchovny and Gillian Anderson, while Mitch Pileggi does not appear. The episode guest stars Karin Konoval–who played Madame Zelma in "Clyde Bruckman's Final Repose" and Mrs. Peacock in "Home" in the original series–who appears in a dual role as brother and sister characters Judy and Chucky Poundstone.

== Reception ==
"Plus One" received generally positive reviews from critics. On Rotten Tomatoes, it has an approval rating of 92% with an average rating of 7.27 out of 10 based on 12 reviews.

In its initial broadcast in the United States on January 17, 2018, it received 3.95 million viewers, which was the same number of viewers as the previous episode.
