= En Ami =

- The X-Files episode
- Episode no.: Season 7 Episode 15
- Directed by: Rob Bowman
- Written by: William B. Davis
- Production code: 7ABX15
- Original air date: March 19, 2000
- Running time: 44 minutes

Guest appearances
- Mitch Pileggi as Walter Skinner; William B. Davis as The Smoking Man; Michael Shamus Wiles as Black-Haired Man; Louise Latham as Marjorie Butters; Tom Braidwood as Melvin Frohike; Dean Haglund as Richard Langly; Bruce Harwood as John Fitzgerald Byers; Michael Canavan as Cameron McPeck; Jacqueline Schultz as Irene McPeck; Cory Parravano as Jason McPeck; Timothy Landfield as Cobra; Tom Bailey as Apartment Manager; Thomas Roe as Guard

Episode chronology
← Previous "Theef"	Next → "Chimera"
- The X-Files season 7

"En Ami" is the fifteenth episode of the seventh season of the science fiction television series The X-Files. It premiered on the Fox network in the United States on March 19, 2000. The episode helped to explore the series' overarching mythology. "En Ami" earned a Nielsen household rating of 7.5, being watched by 11.99 million people in its initial broadcast. The episode received mostly positive reviews from critics, although elements of the script, as well as The Smoking Man's (William B. Davis) motives, were criticized.

The show centers on FBI special agents Fox Mulder (David Duchovny) and Dana Scully (Gillian Anderson) who work on cases linked to the paranormal, called X-Files. Mulder is a believer in the paranormal, while the skeptical Scully has been assigned to debunk his work. In this episode, Scully is intrigued after a young boy with cancer, whose parents don't believe in medical treatment because it is against God's will, recovers miraculously. What she soon discovers is that his cure is not miraculous, but scientific. Eager, if wary, to learn of the truth behind his secrets, Scully agrees to travel with the Smoking Man to get the cure to all mankind's diseases.

The script was Davis' first—and only—writing contribution to the series. Davis, inspired by the Shakespeare play Richard III, wanted to write a story wherein The Smoking Man was able to lure Scully in by enticing her with medical knowledge. In addition, "En Ami" was the last episode of The X-Files to be directed by Rob Bowman. The episode's title means "as a friend" in French and also functions as a pun, reading phonetically as "enemy" in English.

== Plot ==
In Goochland, Virginia, Jason McPeck, a young cancer patient, sees a bright light and men in black approaching his window. The next day, he is miraculously cured of cancer. Fox Mulder (David Duchovny) and Dana Scully (Gillian Anderson) anonymously receive information about Jason's case. Jason tells them that angels came to him and pinched the back of his neck. Scully finds an incision identical to the one she received when she was abducted.

Upon leaving, she finds The Smoking Man (William B. Davis) in her car. He claims that he cured Jason and, because he is dying, wants to atone for his past by giving Scully the cure. She agrees to travel with him but wears a wire to record their conversations for Mulder. Once they are alone, the Smoking Man tells Scully that he feels a special kinship with her because he once held her life in his hands. Meanwhile, Mulder becomes suspicious of Scully's absence and learns that she left with an older man who "smokes like a chimney." The Lone Gunmen then tell Mulder they have found e-mails between Scully and a man called Cobra, who is working on a secret Department of Defense project.

Meanwhile, at a gas station, Scully mails the wire to Mulder, but a man following her and the Smoking Man removes it from the mailbox. Later, Scully awakens in a Pennsylvania cabin and accuses The Smoking Man of drugging her; he claims she was merely exhausted and he was trying to make her comfortable. (Note: In the eleventh season opener "My Struggle III", the Cigarette Smoking Man confesses that he drugged Scully and impregnated her with alien technology, leading to the birth of her son, William.) She considers leaving but decides to continue the trip. The Smoking Man tells Scully that his extraterrestrial cure can treat all human disease. Scully then finds a note directing her to meet Cobra at Calico Cove. Cobra gives her a disc but is shot and killed by the man who has been following them. The man also tries to kill Scully but is killed by The Smoking Man. Scully leaves The Smoking Man and gives the disc to The Lone Gunmen, only to discover that he swapped it for a blank. His office has been emptied, and Mulder concludes that Scully was used to retrieve the information. In the final scene, The Smoking Man throws the real disc into a lake.

== Production ==
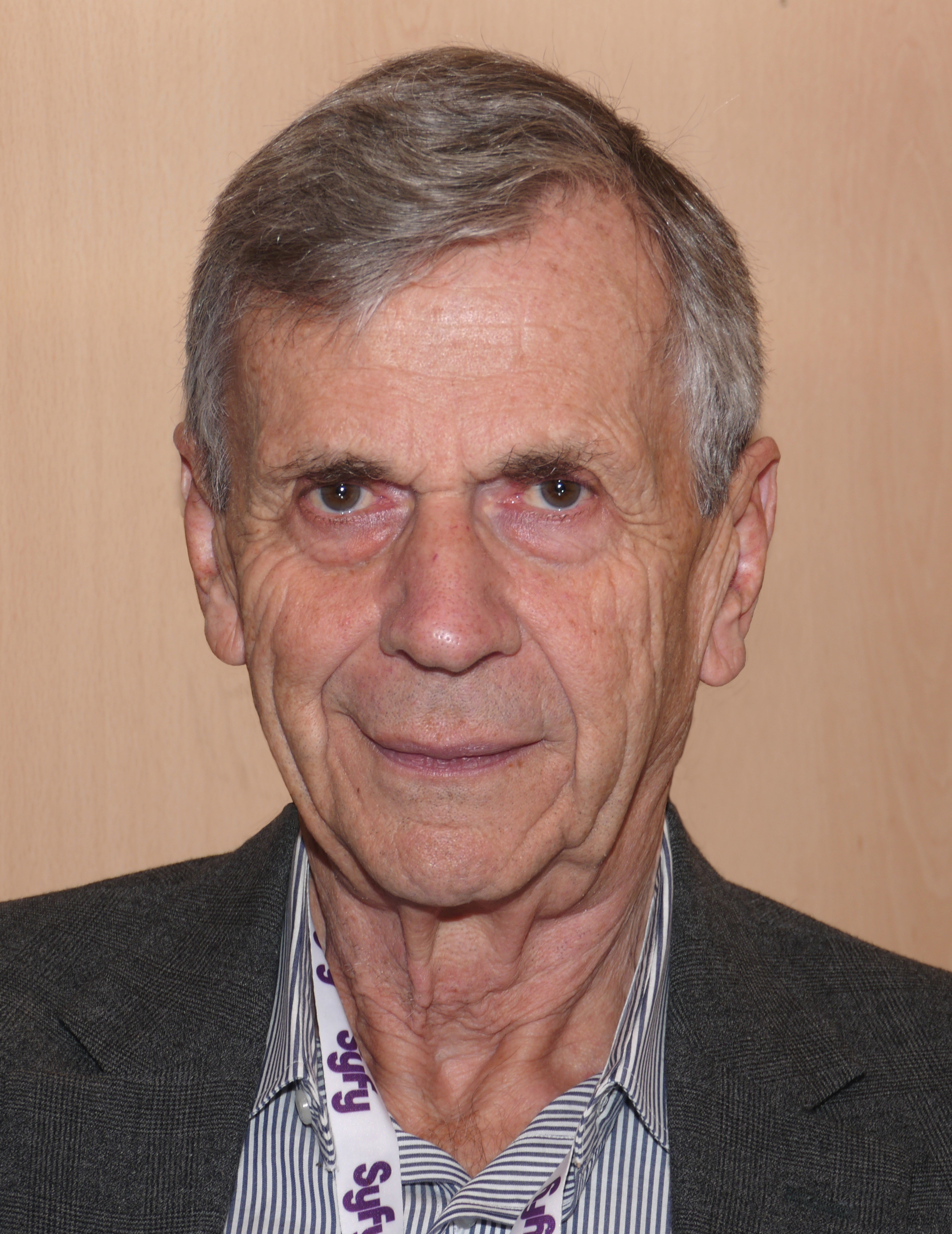
"En Ami" was written by William B. Davis, who played The Smoking Man.

=== Writing ===
The relationship between Scully and Cigarette-Smoking Man was one we had never explored. [...] I thought it was too great an idea not to take a chance on.

— Frank Spotnitz, on the nature of the episode

"En Ami" was written by William B. Davis, who portrayed The Smoking Man. Davis wanted to write an episode in which his character attempted to seduce Scully with something that she cared about: medical knowledge. Davis approached series creator Chris Carter with his idea, and Carter was intrigued. He assigned executive producer Frank Spotnitz to work with Davis and craft a full-fledged script. The script was revised several times, and many of Davis's scenes were cut, including one that featured The Smoking Man teaching Scully how to water-ski. The episode's original script also featured Alex Krycek, whose presence was "integral to the [original] storyline", but this story element too was cut. The first draft of the script was finished in four weeks.

While Davis saw his character as a "romantic hero", Carter and Spotnitz were reluctant to have "Scully [trust] this man she's spent seven years hating" so easily. Eventually, the producers tweaked the script, adding "the reality of The X-Files's existing mythos and past character development" to ease the transition. Davis later noted, "I was basically happy with the way [the episode] turned out, despite the fact that there were many other ideas that I had that I did not get to see. My original conception of the story was that Cigarette-Smoking Man was a much better actor at winning Scully's affections and that Scully was less resistant to this attention to her." Because The Smoking Man was able to manipulate Scully, Carter later referred to "En Ami" as "the creepiest episode of the year."

While elements from this episode were partially inspired by Shakespeare's play Richard III (namely, Richard's attempts to woo Lady Anne), Davis initially wrote the episode so that he could act with Gillian Anderson. He later noted, "If they're not going to give me a scene with Gillian, I'll just have to write one myself." The episode's title, "En Ami," translates from French into English as "as a friend." The title also functions as a pun, reading phonetically as "enemy" in English.

=== Filming ===
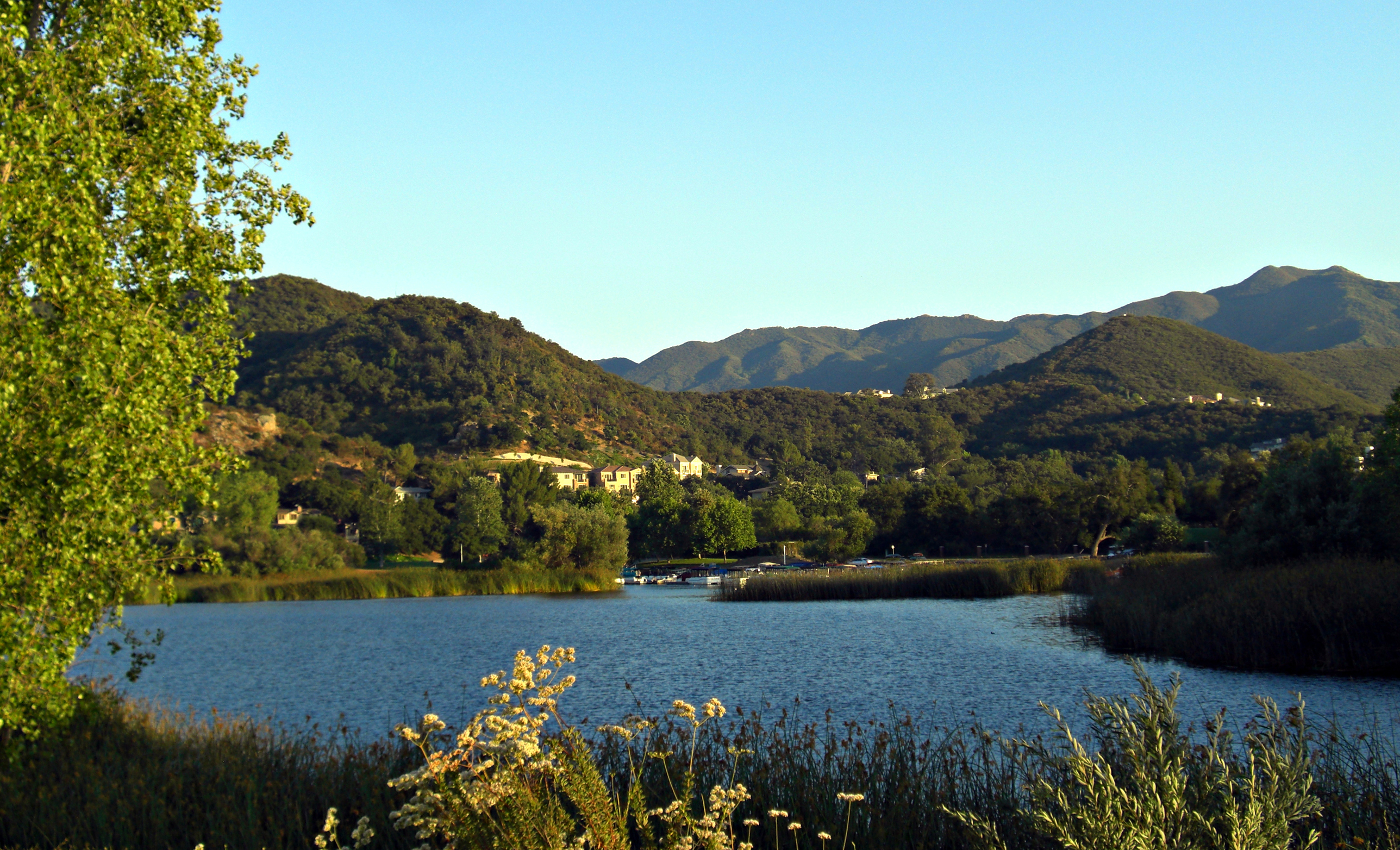
Parts of "En Ami" were filmed at Lake Sherwood, California.

"En Ami" was directed by Rob Bowman and marked his last contribution to the show. Regarding his departure, he later said: "Artistically I felt like I couldn't help any more." Originally, "En Ami" was supposed to air during the first half of seventh season, but the producers realized that placing the episode so close to the Mulder-centric "The Sixth Extinction"/"Amor Fati" arc made character development problematic. It was thus decided to bump the episode to the middle of the season.

Production and filming for the episode were rushed, which resulted in idiosyncrasies. The scene featuring The Smoking Man and Scully eating dinner at a restaurant was actually filmed on two different days: Anderson's side of the scene was shot on one day and Davis' was shot on another. The short schedule also resulted in some quick scene construction, most notably for the dock sequence near the end of the episode. A majority of the lake scenes were filmed at Lake Sherwood, California. A stunt actor, Danny Weselis, filled in for Anderson during the scenes that called for her to drive the motor boat.

== Broadcast and reception ==
"En Ami" first aired in the United States on March 19, 2000. This episode earned a Nielsen rating of 7.5, with an 11 share, meaning that roughly 7.5 percent of all television-equipped households, and 11 percent of households watching television, were tuned in to the episode. It was viewed by 11.99 million viewers. The episode aired in the United Kingdom and Ireland on Sky1 on June 25, 2000, and received 0.62 million viewers, ranking as the fourth most watched episode that week. The episode was later included on The X-Files Mythology, Volume 3 – Colonization, a DVD collection that contains episodes involved with the alien Colonist's plans to take over the earth.

Robert Shearman, in his book Wanting to Believe: A Critical Guide to The X-Files, Millennium & The Lone Gunmen, rated the episode four-and-a-half stars out of five. The author praised the episode, writing, "The plot itself is all smoke (ahem) and mirrors, but that doesn't really matter" and "Davis' skills as both an actor and writer is […] very moving." Rich Rosell from DigitallyObsessed.com awarded the episode 4 out of 5 stars and wrote "Get out your flowcharts to try and keep things straight, as we get to learn a little more about Cigarette Smoking Man and his hijinks, in this ep written by ol' smoky himself. Scully and CSM get some edgy moments together, as info is revealed about an extraterrestrial-based cure for all human diseases. To further confuse things Black-Haired Man from The X-Files feature film shows up, but so do The Lone Gunmen, so all is not lost."

Zack Handlen of The A.V. Club awarded the episode a "B+" and wrote that "it mostly overcomes some significant script flaws". He was critical of the fact that the script "requires Scully to be a lot more naive than she usually is". Handlen wrote that, because the episode was not as believable as it could have been this far into the series, the reveal that The Smoking Man is using Scully is "more disappointing than shocking." Despite these setbacks, he concluded that the episode is largely sound because of the performances of Davis and Anderson, as well as the fact that the entry allowed the audience to gain insight into The Smoking Man's motives. Kenneth Silber from Space.com was not happy with the ambiguity of The Smoking Man, writing, "Perhaps unsurprisingly, the episode provides few answers. And the ending, with its high degree of ambiguity, provides little satisfaction. This reviewer, for one, is puzzled about both CSM's physical condition and his state of mind."

== Bibliography ==
- Hurwitz, Matt; Knowles, Chris (2008). The Complete X-Files. Insight Editions. ISBN 978-1-933784-80-9.
- Shapiro, Marc (2000). All Things: The Official Guide to the X-Files Volume 6. Harper Prism. ISBN 0-06-107611-2.
- Shearman, Robert (2009). Wanting to Believe: A Critical Guide to The X-Files, Millennium & The Lone Gunmen. Mad Norwegian Press. ISBN 978-0-9759446-9-1.
