= My Struggle III =

- The X-Files episode
- Episode no.: Season 11; Episode 1
- Directed by: Chris Carter
- Written by: Chris Carter
- Production code: 2AYW01
- Original air date: January 3, 2018
- Running time: 43 minutes

Guest appearances
- William B. Davis as Cigarette Smoking Man; Annabeth Gish as Monica Reyes; Lauren Ambrose as Agent Einstein; Robbie Amell as Agent Miller; Barbara Hershey as Erika Price; Chris Owens as Jeffrey Spender; Anjali Jay as Dr. Joyet; A.C. Peterson as Mr. Y

Episode chronology
← Previous "My Struggle II"	Next → "This"
- The X-Files season 11

"My Struggle III" is the first episode and season premiere of the eleventh season of the American science fiction television series The X-Files. The episode was written and directed by Chris Carter and it aired on January 3, 2018, on Fox. This episode follows the events of "My Struggle II" and is noted for its major plot twists. "My Struggle III" helps to explore the series' overarching mythology and serves as the first of three mythology episodes of the season. Two taglines are featured in this episode: "I Want to Believe", followed by "I Want to Lie".

The show centers on FBI special agents who work on unsolved paranormal cases called X-Files; focusing on the investigations of Fox Mulder (David Duchovny), and Dana Scully (Gillian Anderson) after their reinstatement in the FBI. In this episode, revolving around the time after the previous episode's conclusion, Scully ends up in the hospital after experiencing a seizure, revealing the events of the previous episode to be a vision of an apocalyptic future. Mulder and Walter Skinner (Mitch Pileggi) find a message from Scully with the words "Find him", which refers to their son William.

== Plot ==
The episode opens with an introduction by the Cigarette Smoking Man (William B. Davis), in which his full name is revealed as Carl Gerhard Busch.

Dana Scully (Gillian Anderson) wakes up in the hospital after having a seizure, now realizing the apparent invasion was a vision and hasn't actually happened yet. She tries to warn Fox Mulder (David Duchovny) about the plague. Mulder initially presumes Scully's ramblings are a product of her illness, but leaves the hospital to investigate. Elsewhere, Jeffrey Spender is chased down and hit by a car in a parking garage. Spender hides behind a door of an apartment building as his would-be assailant demands the whereabouts of a boy. Spender calls Mulder and the Smoking Man intercepts the call, revealing that he is in a room with Monica Reyes. A car chase soon unfolds in which Mulder is able to evade another man.

Spender later appears at Scully's bedside, revealing that someone is looking for William. He first balks at telling her the location of her son, revealing only the name of the family that adopted him – Van De Kamp. Mulder tails a henchman who he believes will take him to the Smoking Man, but he arrives somewhere else with mysterious conspirators; Mr. Y (A.C. Peterson) and Erika Price (Barbara Hershey). The pair says they were once part of the Syndicate, but have their own agenda involving the colonization of space. They try to negotiate with Mulder into turning over his son, but Mulder refuses.

Walter Skinner (Mitch Pileggi) tries to meet with Scully, but can't find her. As he goes to his car, he is met inside by the Smoking Man and Reyes, the latter holding him at gunpoint. The Smoking Man asks Skinner to turn his back on humanity in return for immunity from the Spartan virus, but Skinner is very hesitant. Meanwhile, Scully tries to leave the hospital but her seizures return, causing her to crash her car. She is rescued by agents Einstein and Miller, and is readmitted to the hospital. Both agents leave the room. An assassin sent by Mr. Y and Erika enters and tries to suffocate Scully, but Mulder steps in and saves her by slicing the assassin's neck.

After Mulder kills the assassin, Scully says that she doesn't think the Smoking Man sent him. She then reveals her visions are from William. As Skinner comes in, Mulder confronts him since he smells like smoke. In a flashback to Skinner in a car with the Smoking Man, the latter states in a further flashback that he, not Mulder, artificially impregnated Scully. The final scene (out of focus) shows a teen, presumably William, having seizures.

== Production ==
=== Filming ===
Filming for the season began in August 2017 in Vancouver, British Columbia, where the previous season was filmed, along with the show's original five seasons.

=== Writing ===
The mythology from the previous event series of The X-Files, had negative reviews, causing Chris Carter to focus less on the mythology and have more standalone stories. In various interviews Carter had already planned the solution to "My Struggle II", while it was in production.

The episode is notorious for completely changing a respective part of the show's mythology: revealing that Mulder is not William's father, but that Cigarette Smoking Man had drugged and raped ("artificially impregnated") Scully years ago. This also answers a respective scene from season 7 episode "En Ami" in which Scully woke up in a room in pajamas during a road trip with the Cigarette Smoking Man, accusing him of drugging her. The dialogue in the scene was slightly altered. According to Chris Carter, he planned this strategy ever since that episode was filmed. He explains that it "adds to the characters in an interesting emotional way. And because the audience is now in on this truth, and Mulder and Scully are not, these revelations are huge for this show because they're huge for the characters. Mulder and Scully's life history, both professional and personal, are the heart of the show."

=== Casting ===
Besides main cast members David Duchovny, Gillian Anderson and Mitch Pileggi, the episode features several guest stars, including original series stars William B. Davis and Annabeth Gish, and the return of Lauren Ambrose and Robbie Amell, whose characters debuted in season ten. The episode features the return of character Jeffrey Spender played by Chris Owens, who last appeared in the original series finale episode which aired in 2002. Barbara Hershey also makes her first appearance as a new recurring character, Erika Price.

== Reception ==
"My Struggle III" received generally mixed-to-negative reviews from critics. On Rotten Tomatoes, it has an approval rating of 33% with an average rating of 5.96 out of 10 based on 9 reviews. The episode received strong backlash from fans, particularly the reveal that Cigarette Smoking Man was the father of Scully's son William.

In its initial broadcast in the United States on January 3, 2018, it received 5.2 million viewers, which was a 62 percent decrease in viewership from the previous season premiere in 2016 which had 16.2 million viewers. In the United Kingdom, where the episode was broadcast on February 5, 2018, on Channel 5, it was watched by a total of 1.87 million viewers over a 28-day period, including on the timeshift channel, Channel 5 +1, and the on demand service, My5.
