= Syndicate (The X-Files) =

Shadow government group in The X-Files

In the fictional universe of the science fiction–thriller media franchise The X-Files, The Syndicate is a nefarious group of covertly allied influential government officials and businessmen. Also referred to as The Elders, The Consortium, and The Group, it is the primary antagonistic force opposing Dana Scully, Fox Mulder, John Doggett, and Monica Reyes during the series.

== Overview ==
An embodiment of the concept of the shadow government in UFO conspiracy theory lore, the Syndicate is depicted as operating at the highest levels of power, concealing from the world a program by an unidentified extraterrestrial species to colonize and repopulate the planet, as well as their own plans and stake in that future, which they hold to be inevitable.

To carry out murder, cover-ups, sabotage and other wetworks projects, the Syndicate uses an unknown number of henchmen commonly referred to as the Men in Black. Many work ostensibly for the U.S. Defense Department, Central Intelligence Agency, National Security Agency, along with various other government agencies. Prominent Men in Black agents include X, Alex Krycek, the Crew Cut Man, and Quiet Willy.

The leader of the Syndicate is a former German industrialist named Conrad Strughold, who had fled his home country and relocated to Tunisia. However, most of the Syndicate's meetings are held at a nondescript building located on West 46th Street (with parallels to the Century Association and Ivy League alumni clubs) in New York City, and do not involve Strughold, due to the fact that his entry into the United States would potentially draw too much attention because of his ties to Nazi Germany. Meetings with Strughold are instead held in London. A possible front for the group, evidenced in the episode "Redux II", is a biotechnology firm called Roush. Reportedly, series creator Chris Carter named the company after USA Today TV critic Matt Roush, who was an influential early champion of The X-Files. Roush's facilities are used in some experiments involving the virus, shown in the sixth season premiere "The Beginning". Also, according to Alvin Kurtzweil, when the alien takeover was set to commence in December 2012, the Syndicate would have seized control of the United States via the Federal Emergency Management Agency (FEMA), which had the power to suspend constitutional government upon declaration of a national emergency.

== Appearances ==
=== Early years ===
The Syndicate was formed at the end of World War II, after the Roswell incident 1947, when German scientists were brought to the United States to work on developing an alien-human hybrid. Alvin Kurtzweil recounted that when he and Bill Mulder were young men in the military, they were recruited for a project that they were told was concerned with biological warfare. Deep Throat claimed that it began after Roswell, when an ultrasecret conference of power brokers in the United States, the Soviet Union, United Kingdom, China, France, West Germany, and East Germany, signed a treaty that if an alien spacecraft crashed on Earth and the extraterrestrials survived, the country that held them would be responsible for their immediate extermination.

The group that would become the Syndicate existed as early as 1952 as a secret group within the Department of State. Their activities included experimenting with xenotransplantation, relocating ex-Nazi scientists to the United States after World War II, and covering up the black oil discovered in the Piper Maru in 1953.

The colonists in 1973 when they forged their alliance with the Syndicate

The members of the Syndicate within the State Department officially broke off ties with the United States government in 1973. However, some of the members continued to work within the State Department. On October 13, the Syndicate formally forged their alliance with the alien colonists at El Rico Air Force Base. The Cigarette Smoking Man personally presented a folded American flag to the aliens, symbolizing their surrender to a superior intergalactic force. The Syndicate was also commencing their work on the Project, which would see an immense effort in creating an alien/human hybrid to serve the aliens as a slave race after colonization. To allow the Syndicate to develop the hybrid, they were provided an alien fetus from which to extract DNA and begin research. However, the aliens demanded in exchange samples of human DNA. Members of the Syndicate turned over their loved ones to the aliens as part of the exchange. The Cigarette Smoking Man handed over his wife, Cassandra Spender, and William Mulder reluctantly surrendered his daughter, Samantha.

By March 22, 1993, the Syndicate had use of a vast warehouse in The Pentagon where artifacts constituting evidence of alien existence were stored. The Cigarette Smoking Man added an implant, recovered by Mulder and Scully on their first case together, to the items kept in this storage facility. As Mulder and Scully learned, other efforts to erase their findings were apparently made, including the disappearance of paperwork, such as a case file on Billy Miles, that the agents had filed with the District Attorney's office in Raymon County, Oregon.

=== Destruction ===
In 1998, the Syndicate learned of a rebel faction among the aliens that was fighting against their brethren and the colonization of Earth. The first incident of rebel violence on Earth occurred in Kazakhstan, where dozens of impending abductees were found incinerated. Marita Covarrubias investigated the incident and quickly had it covered up. Shortly thereafter, many more abductees were summoned to Skyland Mountain via their metallic tags. Again, the group was attacked and incinerated by the alien rebels. It was at this time that the rebels were more clearly identified as being faceless—with their facial orifices sewn shut to prevent black oil infection—a telltale characteristic that set them apart as the rebel force. The following year, the rebels made their most daring—and most destructive—move. Outside of Washington, D.C., they attacked a train car, wherein a group of Syndicate doctors led by Eugene Openshaw were experimenting on Cassandra Spender—the first successful alien-human hybrid. The rebels incinerated the doctors, but left Cassandra alive so that the Project would be revealed and subsequently destroyed. Indeed, one of the rebels killed the Second Elder and assumed his position at meetings of the Syndicate; however, The Smoking Man realized this and had the group cease meeting together.

The Smoking Man contacted his son, Jeffrey Spender, and charged him with killing the rebel posing as the Second Elder. However, Spender failed, and Alex Krycek successfully completed the assassination. Spender then realized the scope of the conspiracy being carried out by his father, and he pledged his support to Fox Mulder. Having their hand forced by the rebels, the Syndicate retrieved Cassandra Spender and prepared to present her to the aliens so that colonization could begin. However, the rebels instead appeared and incinerated the entire group of high-ranking Syndicate members, meaning the destruction of the Syndicate.

=== Legacy ===
Later in 1999, Scully asked Mulder what more he could possibly hope to do or to find, after having done and uncovered so much, such as exposing the secrets of a conspiracy of men who had been doing human experiments but were all now dead. Mulder's reply was that he still hoped to find his sister. Later on, Mulder dreamt of the Syndicate, in which an illusory version of the Cigarette Smoking Man claimed that his group had "made entire cultures disappear".

In reality, the Cigarette Smoking Man continued working on the Project with a group of men who held a conference to discuss colonization in 1999. The Cigarette Smoking Man also continued working with his doctors, who were aware of the Syndicate's work to create a human-alien hybrid and attempted to continue this work. The Cigarette Smoking Man is also seen, in "Biogenesis", meeting with a group of men, some in military uniforms, who are speaking about some sort of disaster and "containment" of it. Presumably they are speaking about colonization, and this assembly of men may be part of the Cigarette Smoking Man's intentions, revealed in "Requiem", to try to rebuild the conspiracy.

In season eight, Doctor Lizzy Gill admitted to Mulder, Assistant Director Walter Skinner and Special agent John Doggett that, for the past ten years, she and her colleagues had been working to create a human-alien hybrid. According to her, the work had originally been financed by a group of government men but had continued after their deaths. Gill's colleagues, by this time, included Doctors Parenti, Lev and Duffy Haskell, but they all had been killed recently by super soldier Billy Miles.

With the Syndicate eliminated, the power vacuum was eventually filled in season nine by a new government-like organization. This organization included members such as the Toothpick Man, Gene Crane, and Knowle Rohrer, among others. All known members revealed to viewers in the series were super soldiers, men with superhuman abilities - with the exception of Alex Krycek, who was killed in "Existence". During the season finale, "The Truth" this unnamed organization shuts down the X-Files office at the Federal Bureau of Investigation. Mulder was left on the run until all his criminal charges were lifted in The X-Files: I Want to Believe. In the eleventh season premiere "My Struggle III", Mulder encountered Mr. Y and his accomplice Erika Price, who claimed to be former members of the Syndicate with their own agenda involving the colonization of space and simulated reality.

== Men in Black ==
The Men in Black is the unofficial name of a group of enforcers employed by the Syndicate to take care of the dirty work of the conspiracy. Most of them were ex-military, highly trained and loyal hitmen, who worked as a front in government agencies such as the Federal Bureau of Investigation, Department of Defense, and the National Security Agency.

The Men in Black are analogous to the Alien Bounty Hunters employed by the Colonists. The Men in Black were, however, not as reliable as the bounty hunters and though sometimes they were used initially it took the more capable Alien Bounty Hunters to complete difficult tasks. The Syndicate would use the bounty hunters only when absolutely necessary because of an increased risk of exposure.

== See also ==
- Majestic 12, a debunked supposed-group of UFO insiders
