= Jeffrey Spender =

Fictional character in The X-Files

- The X-Files character
- Chris Owens as Jeffrey Spender
- First appearance: "Patient X"
- Portrayed by: Chris Owens; Michal Suchanek (young)

In-universe information
- Occupation: FBI Special agent
- Birthname: Jeffrey Frank Spender
- Affiliated with: Syndicate
- Duration: 1998–99, 2002, 2018

FBI Special agent Jeffrey Frank Spender is a fictional character in the American Fox television series The X-Files, a science fiction show about a government conspiracy to hide or deny the truth of alien existence. Spender (along with his partner, Diana Fowley) was in control of the X-Files office after Fox Mulder's and Dana Scully's forced exit in "The Beginning". The X-Files office is concerned with cases with particularly mysterious or possibly supernatural circumstances that were left unsolved and shelved by the FBI. Portrayed by Canadian actor Chris Owens, Spender was a recurring character during the fifth and sixth seasons, before returning for the ninth season of The X-Files in a guest role. He returned for the eleventh season of the show.

Federal Bureau of Investigation Special agent Spender made his first appearance in the fifth season 1998 episode "Patient X". During his earlier appearances in the series, because of Mulder's belief in extraterrestrial life, Spender acted unfriendly towards him. But when re-appearing in the ninth season, Spender had moved on to respect and agree with Mulder's beliefs, which is proven to him in "Two Fathers", when he sees and helps to kill an alien rebel.

== Character arc ==
Spender was a skeptic who was assigned to The X-Files after Fox Mulder's forced departure. Spender is the son of the "Cigarette Smoking Man", and the "Cigarette Smoking Man's" ex-wife, multiple abductee Cassandra Spender. Heavily involved in the Syndicate at that time, the "Cigarette Smoking Man" abandoned the family when Spender was 12 years old. Subsequently, his mother was driven insane by what she claims were multiple alien abductions. Shortly after Samantha Mulder was abducted and then returned, Jeffrey and Samantha were raised together by his father in California. Spender met Agents Fox Mulder and Dana Scully in 1998. The same year, the "Cigarette Smoking Man" began sending him letters; however Spender returned them unopened. After his father set fire to The X-Files in "The End", Spender with Agent Diana Fowley start working on the X-Files. Spender got orders from the "Cigarette Smoking Man" to push and eventually get Mulder and Scully fired from the FBI, which he eventually does in "Two Fathers". Later on he reinstates Mulder and Scully to The X-Files but is shot in the head and apparently killed by his father in "One Son".

Three years later it is revealed in "William", that he survived the gunshot, but was subjected to horribly disfiguring experiments at the hand of his father. Posing as Mulder, he infiltrated Scully's house, and injected William with a magnetite substance to seemingly "cure" the baby of his telekinetic powers. The motivation or repercussions of his actions are never fully explained. He testified for the defense during Mulder's murder trial in "The Truth". He also revealed during the trial that Teena Mulder was having an affair with the "Cigarette Smoking Man", and that he and Fox Mulder are half-brothers. A DNA test conducted on a disfigured Spender in the episode "William" initially led agents Scully, Doggett and Reyes to believe he was Mulder thus lending further credence to Spender's claim that both he and Mulder are the children of the "Cigarette Smoking Man".

He reappears in "My Struggle III," having received reconstructive surgery. He warns Mulder and Scully that government agents are seeking out William.

== Conceptual history ==
=== Creation and early development ===
Chris Owens had previously portrayed the Cigarette Smoking Man in the episodes, "Musings of a Cigarette Smoking Man" and "Demons", he had portrayed The Great Mutato in "The Post-Modern Prometheus" on the show before being cast as Spender. Owens had also landed a guest role on The X-Files spin-off Millennium. Chris Carter and David Duchovny were so pleased with his portrayal of The Great Mutato that he was picked for the role, without making an audition. Most of the crew members reacted positively to the selection. When creating the character of Spender, Carter had no long term plans for Owens involvement, meaning that Spender's involvement wouldn't differ much from different previous recurring characters of the show. Michal Suchanek made a small cameo appearance in "The Red and the Black" as a young version of Spender.

However, as the fifth season's production period entered its final months, rumors began to circulate – especially among the production crew members in Vancouver, British Columbia, Canada – about the future of the series, particularly concerning whether the show would be moving to Los Angeles, California for the sixth season and whether the new recurring character of Jeffrey Spender was planned (in case David Duchovny cut back his commitment to the series) to become a replacement for Duchovny's character of Fox Mulder – either as a part-time or full-fledged substitute. Other, contradictory rumors that Owens heard were that either he or Duchovny would appear in only eight episodes of the sixth season and that his casting as Spender was a sign that the series would either be leaving Vancouver or staying there. According to the actor himself, he always knew that Duchovny would not be leaving the series but only discovered that The X-Files would indeed be moving to Los Angeles when the official announcement was made.

According to Owens, he first learned of Spender's seeming demise in "One Son" via the usual way – when Chris Carter phoned the actor to discuss his latest script – and, upon Carter telling him that Jeffrey Spender would make an heroic exit from the series' story arc, Owens questioned himself about this news as he was slightly unable to believe that he was leaving the series so soon. Apparently, the news of Spender's departure from the series was confirmed for him shortly thereafter, however, when he received the episode's script.

When it came time to film Spender's final scene in "One Son", actor William B. Davis became upset, saying that he didn't want to shoot Owens and adding that he enjoyed working with the actor. On the other hand, Davis had no trouble with slapping Owens, in a scene of "Two Fathers" in which Spender is twice hit by the Cigarette Smoking Man.

=== Later development in Season 9 ===
"That makeup job that Owens endured probably took maybe six hours. Cheri Metcalfe, she would come up with these designs and sketches and bring them to myself and Chris [Carter] and Frank [Spotnitz], and the three of us would pow-wow with Vince Gilligan and John Shiban, and most of those makeup decisions or any creative decision were really kind of done or decided as a team."
— Kim Manners talking about Owens make-up job during his return to the last season.

Three years after Spender had been written out of the series and actor Chris Owens had moved to Toronto, Ontario, Canada, Owens received an unexpected phone call from David Duchovny, who said that The X-Files' production crew was filming the series' finale as well as another episode late in the season, and that he wanted to bring Spender back for these two episodes. Duchovny reassured Owens that Spender's survival of the shooting years earlier could be explained away via the plot device of an alien injection but mentioned that the experience would not be fun for Owens, as he would be "under all that shit"; Owens did not realize what Duchovny meant until he got to the studio and saw the makeup for Spender's disfigured appearance, a sight that shocked Owens.

== Reception ==
Entertainment Weekly writer Ken Tucker called Chris Owens portrayal of Spender "gloriously stiff-necked". Lon Grahnke from The Chicago Sun-Times responded positively to the character, calling Spender "devious". Shortly after the premiere of "Terms of Endearment", Owens started to notice "strange reactions" from people on the street. He assumed their odd expressions were those of "annoyance" with his character because of his actions. One day, one particularly aggravated fan of the series actually shook his finger at Owens and called him a "Paper shredder!".
