= Glen Morgan =

American television producer, writer, and director (born 1961)

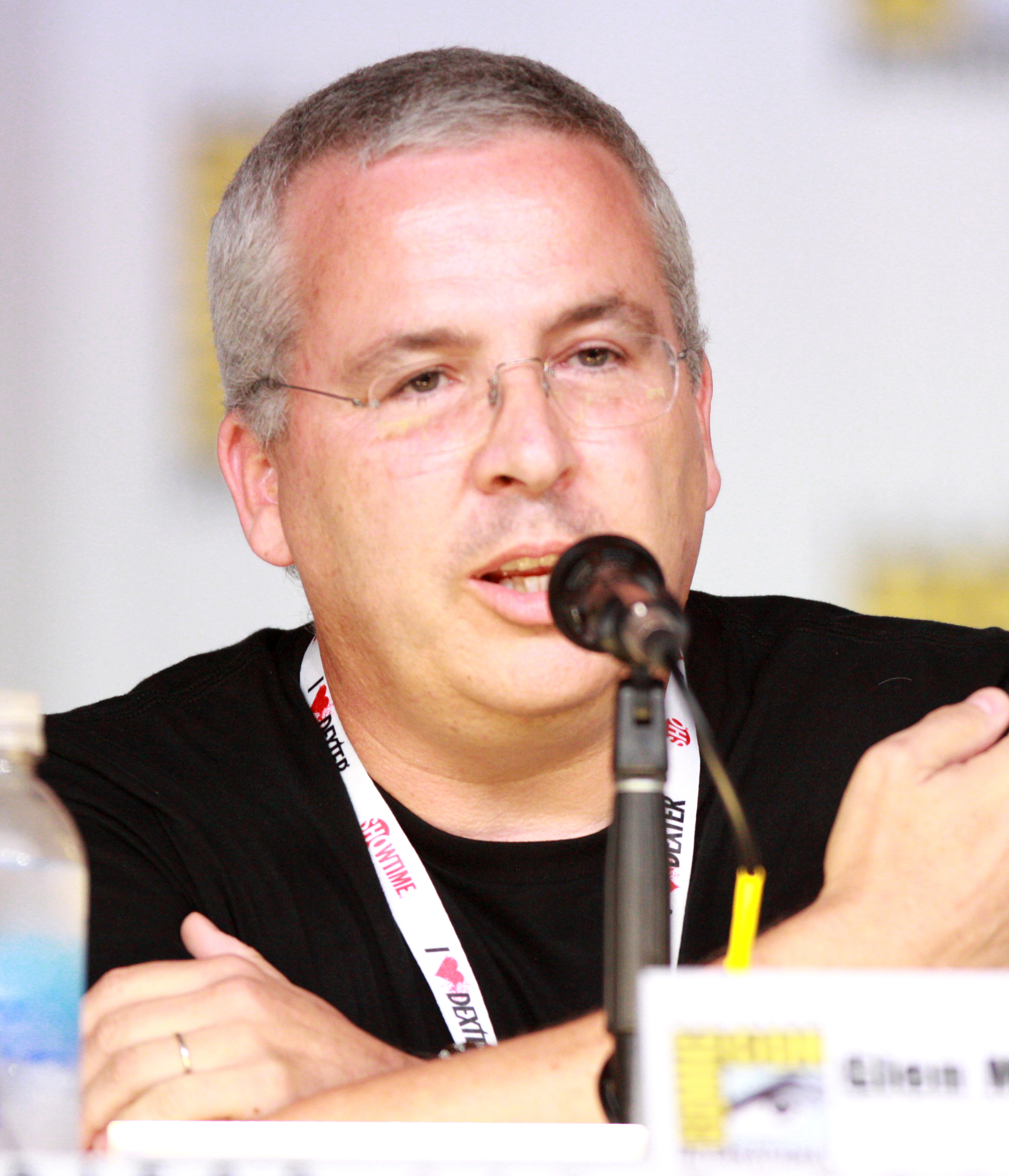
- Morgan at the 2013 San Diego Comic Con
- Born: July 12, 1961 (age 65); Syracuse, New York, U.S.
- Education: Loyola Marymount University
- Occupations: Writer, director, producer
- Notable work: The X-Files
- Spouse: Kristen Cloke (m. 1998)

Glen Morgan (born July 12, 1961) is an American television producer, writer and director. He is best known for co-writing episodes of the Fox science fiction supernatural drama series The X-Files with his partner, James Wong. He served as an executive producer on the show's eleventh season. He also executive produced The Twilight Zone reboot by Jordan Peele's Monkeypaw Productions.

== Early life ==
Morgan resided in Syracuse, New York, before moving to El Cajon, California at the age of 14.

While attending El Cajon Valley High School, he met James Wong, who would become his friend and professional partner. Both enrolled at Loyola Marymount University, graduating from the School of Film and Television in 1983.

== Career ==
Morgan did not want to work in television at first, but wound up accepting a job on 21 Jump Street with James Wong as his writing partner. This would later earn him and Wong a steady job at Stephen J. Cannell Productions. As both men were about to leave the company following writing for The Commish in 1992, their former boss at Cannell, Peter Roth, invited them to work on a new show being developed at 20th Television, The X-Files.

Morgan and Wong left The X-Files after season two to create their own show, Space: Above and Beyond, which was canceled after one season. They returned to The X-Files for season four, after which, Chris Carter hired the duo as showrunners for season two of Millennium. Both Morgan and Wong would eventually jump to film, creating the Final Destination series, The One, the 2003 remake of Willard, and the 2006 remake of Black Christmas, as well as work on American television shows The Others and The X-Files spinoff, The Lone Gunmen. Afterwards, Morgan and Wong developed different interests and started working separately.

In May 2007, The Hollywood Reporter reported that Morgan had joined the production team of NBC's Bionic Woman as an executive producer, however in September 2007 it was reported that Morgan left the show due to "creative differences".

In 2010, Morgan served as executive producer on Cartoon Network's Tower Prep alongside Paul Dini. Morgan was a co-ep on The River in 2012, before writing and serving as executive producer on Those Who Kill for A&E in 2014.

Later in 2014, Morgan was hired on as the writer and executive producer of Intruders, which premiered on BBC America on August 23, 2014.

In 2015, Morgan was once again called in by The X-Files creator and show runner Chris Carter to executive produce The X-Files season ten event series, which aired in 2016 on Fox. Morgan wrote and directed one episode titled "Home Again" that was met with positive reviews from critics.

In 2017, Morgan was executive producer and writer of Amazon's Lore, before leaving the series to serve as executive producer on The X-Files season eleven. Morgan wrote and directed one episode, "This", which was met with generally positive reviews from critics. He directed a second episode titled "Rm9sbG93ZXJz", which received very positive reviews from critics.

In 2019, Morgan was executive producer for the Twilight Zone reboot headed up by Jordan Peele and Monkeypaw Productions.

== Personal life ==
Morgan has been married since 1998 to actress Kristen Cloke, whom he met while working on Space: Above & Beyond. At the time, Morgan was divorcing from his first wife, Cindy, with whom he had a daughter. Cloke has appeared in several of his other projects, including Millennium, Willard, Final Destination, The X-Files, and Black Christmas. They have two children.

He is the older brother of fellow X-Files writer Darin Morgan.

== Filmography ==
Film

| Year | Title | Director | Writer | Producer |
|---|---|---|---|---|
| 1985 | The Boys Next Door | No | Yes | No |
| 1986 | Trick or Treat | No | Uncredited | No |
| 2000 | Final Destination | No | Yes | Yes |
| 2001 | The One | No | Yes | Yes |
| 2003 | Willard | Yes | Yes | Yes |
| 2006 | Final Destination 3 | 2nd Unit | Yes | Yes |
| 2006 | Black Christmas | Yes | Yes | Yes |

Television

| Year | Title | Director | Writer | Executive Producer | Notes |
|---|---|---|---|---|---|
| 1988 | Knightwatch | No | Yes | No | Also story editor |
| 1989–1990 | 21 Jump Street | No | Yes | No | Also executive story editor |
| 1989–1990 | Booker | No | Yes | No | Also executive story editor |
| 1990 | Wiseguy | No | Yes | No | |
| 1990 | The 100 Lives of Black Jack Savage | No | Yes | No | Also creator |
| 1991–1993 | The Commish | No | Yes | No | |
| 1993–1997; 2016–2018 | The X-Files | Yes | Yes | Yes | Also co-executive producer and consulting producer |
| 1995–1996 | Space: Above and Beyond | No | Yes | Yes | Also creator |
| 1996–1998 | Millennium | No | Yes | Yes | Also consulting producer |
| 2000 | The Others | No | Yes | Yes | |
| 2010 | Tower Prep | No | Yes | Yes | |
| 2012 | The River | No | Yes | Yes | Also co-executive producer |
| 2014 | Those Who Kill | No | Yes | Yes | Also developer |
| 2014 | Intruders | No | Yes | Yes | Also developer |
| 2017 | Lore | No | Yes | Yes | |
| 2019–2020 | The Twilight Zone | No | Yes | Yes | |
| 2023 | Almost Paradise | No | Yes | No | |
