= This (The X-Files) =

- The X-Files episode
- Episode no.: Season 11; Episode 2
- Directed by: Glen Morgan
- Written by: Glen Morgan
- Production code: 2AYW02
- Original air date: January 10, 2018
- Running time: 43 minutes

Guest appearances
- Dean Haglund as Langly; Barbara Hershey as Erika Price

Episode chronology
| ← Previous "My Struggle III" | Next → "Plus One" |
- The X-Files season 11

"This" is the second episode of the eleventh season of the American science fiction television series The X-Files. The episode was written and directed by Glen Morgan and it aired on January 10, 2018, on Fox. The tagline for this episode is "Accuse your enemies of that which you are guilty", also known as "accusation in a mirror". The episode is a monster of the week tale and only tangentially related to the series ongoing Mythology.

== Plot ==
Mulder and Scully are asleep at Mulder's home when his phone suddenly activates, with a distorted image of Langly (Dean Haglund). His appearance catches the agents by surprise, since he and The Lone Gunmen have been dead for years. However, three armed men suddenly break into the home, causing a shootout with the agents. Two of them are killed; the last one escapes. As a second group of armed men arrive, Scully calls Walter Skinner (Mitch Pileggi) for help, only to be told to surrender. The second group is able to enter the house and place the agents in handcuffs, but they manage to escape and run through the woods. Skinner spots them and helps them get away.

Mulder and Scully travel to Arlington National Cemetery and find the tombstones of the Lone Gunmen. The agents discover that their birth and death dates are inaccurate and Langly’s is facing in the wrong direction. After solving a questionably convoluted puzzle, they come upon the tombstone of Deep Throat, whose name is revealed to be Ronald Pakula. Mulder and Scully find a chip with a QR code in his tombstone. One of the shooters, identified as belonging to a Russian group of assassins, arrives to attack them. However, he is tackled and knocked out by Mulder.

The agents scan the code to find images of the Long Lines Building in New York City, the home of an NSA program called Titanpointe and a project codenamed Blarney. They run into Skinner, who gives them access to the X-Files online. The agents discover that the files surrounding Langly were hacked and removed. They come across a file in the other Gunmen's folders, leading them to Karen Hamby. She explains that they uploaded her and Langly's consciousness into a simulation that would come to life when they died. She adds that Langly's virtual consciousness sent the message. Before she can finish explaining how to contact Langly's consciousness within the simulation, she is killed by the Russian assassin, who is shot by Scully in response.

Mulder uses Hamby's algorithms to communicate with Langly, who poignantly conveys the horror of virtual heaven. He tells them that the great minds of the world within the virtual reality have been reduced to digital slaves, and the agents need to shut it down. Mulder and Scully enter the Long Lines Building and are attacked on the stairway, but Scully escapes. Mulder is led to a room with Erika Price (Barbara Hershey), revealing that she is the one responsible for devising the simulation. Price insists she's able to painlessly copy a person's consciousness anytime they use a cellphone, and advises Mulder to change the way he looks at the world.

After wondering if he could get uploaded with Scully, Mulder escapes. Meanwhile, Scully breaks through the glass barriers protecting the servers and turns off the simulation. She reunites with Mulder, and both agents escape. They return with additional FBI agents to find an empty office and the servers gone. The episode ends with Langly attempting to contact Mulder again, insisting that he “destroy the backup”. However, before he can reveal the location, Langly is cut off by the Russian man, who is now part of the virtual heaven.

== Production ==
=== Filming ===
Filming for the season began in August 2017 in Vancouver, British Columbia, where the previous season was filmed, along with the show's original five seasons.

=== Casting ===
Besides main cast members David Duchovny, Gillian Anderson and Mitch Pileggi, the episode features guest stars, Barbara Hershey, and the return of Dean Haglund, originally killed off in Season 9.

== Reception ==
"This" received generally positive reviews from critics. On Rotten Tomatoes, it has an approval rating of 94% with an average rating of 7.70 out of 10 based on 18 reviews.

In its initial broadcast in the United States on January 10, 2018, it received 3.95 million viewers, which was a 23 percent decrease in viewership from the previous episode, which had 5.15 million viewers. When taking into account the Live +7 ratings for the week of January 8–14, it received 5.94 million viewers.
