= Deadalive =

- The X-Files episode
- The exhumed three-month-old body of Fox Mulder. The scene featured a double wearing a mask of David Duchovny's face.
- Episode no.: Season 8 Episode 15
- Directed by: Tony Wharmby
- Written by: Chris Carter; Frank Spotnitz
- Production code: 8ABX15
- Original air date: April 1, 2001
- Running time: 44 minutes

Guest appearances
- Mitch Pileggi as Walter Skinner; James Pickens, Jr. as Alvin Kersh; Arlene Pileggi as Skinner's Assistant; Zachary Ansley as Billy Miles; Sheila Larken as Margaret Scully; Nicholas Lea as Alex Krycek; Tom Braidwood as Melvin Frohike; Dean Haglund as Richard Langly; Bruce Harwood as John Fitzgerald Byers; Richard McGonagle as Dr. Francis Orovetz; Nelson Mashita as Dr. Lim; Larry Rippenkroeger as First Deckhand; Judson Scott as Absalom

Episode chronology
← Previous "This Is Not Happening"	Next → "Three Words"
- The X-Files season 8

"Deadalive" (or "DeadAlive") is the fifteenth episode of the eighth season of the science fiction television series The X-Files. It was written by executive producers Chris Carter and Frank Spotnitz, and was directed by Tony Wharmby. It explores the series' alien mythology story arc. Following its North American premiere on April 1, 2001, it received a Nielsen household rating of 7.3 and was watched by 12.4 million viewers. It garnered mixed reviews; while most critics were happy with the return of actor David Duchovny, some criticized the episode's plot holes. It later won the show's last Emmy Award, for Outstanding Makeup.

The season centers on Federal Bureau of Investigation (FBI) special agents Dana Scully (Gillian Anderson) and her new partner John Doggett (Robert Patrick)—following the alien abduction and death of her former partner, Fox Mulder (Duchovny)—who work on cases linked to the paranormal, known as X-Files. In this episode, agent Mulder is buried, but after the body of alien abductee Billy Miles (Zachary Ansley) revives before an autopsy, assistant director Walter Skinner (Mitch Pileggi) orders Mulder's body to be exhumed. When Mulder's body is uncovered, weak vital signs are discovered. Meanwhile, rogue FBI agent Alex Krycek (Nicholas Lea) uses a nanobot infection in Skinner's blood and a vaccine to save Mulder as leverage to make him kill Scully's unborn child. Eventually, Mulder is revived and reunites with Scully.

"Deadalive" was a story milestone for the series, re-introducing Duchovny after his abduction by aliens planning to colonize Earth in the seventh-season finale "Requiem". Spotnitz and Carter deliberately wrote and structured the episode in such a way so as to imply that Duchovny had been written out of the series. "Deadalive" featured several elaborate-make-up scenes, which head make-up effects artist Matthew Mungle was given only six days to complete. The episode has been analyzed for its themes of disease, suffering, healing, salvation and resurrection; Mulder seemingly rising from the dead has been seen as an allusion to the resurrection of Jesus.

== Plot ==
=== Background ===
In the seventh-season finale "Requiem", FBI special agent Fox Mulder (David Duchovny) was abducted by aliens. In the eighth-season premiere "Within", John Doggett (Robert Patrick) took his place on the X-Files, and worked with Dana Scully (Gillian Anderson) to find Mulder. In "This Is Not Happening", Scully, Doggett and FBI assistant director Walter Skinner (Mitch Pileggi) discovered several returned abductees. Although nearly all were in critical condition, a UFO cult, led by the mysterious Absalom (Judson Scott), was using Jeremiah Smith's (Roy Thinnes) healing powers to treat the abductees. Scully headed to their compound, only to discover Mulder's deceased body in the woods.

=== Events ===
Three months after Mulder's funeral, Doggett is offered a transfer from the X-Files. He realizes that if he leaves, the office will be closed, as Scully will soon be on maternity leave. Meanwhile, a fishing trawler finds the decomposing body of Billy Miles (Zachary Ansley)—an alien abductee who was taken at the same time as Mulder. When Miles revives on the autopsy table, Skinner, despite Doggett's objections, orders that Mulder's body be exhumed and brought to a hospital, fearing that he may have been buried alive. When the casket is opened, a decomposing Mulder, contrary to all scientific expectations, shows weak vital signs. Meanwhile, Scully notices that Miles (now on life support) has two heartbeats.

Deputy Director Alvin Kersh unsuccessfully tries to convince Doggett to stop investigating Mulder's apparent death. A short while later, as Skinner walks down a hallway, Alex Krycek (Nicholas Lea) activates nanobots that he had previously placed in Skinner's bloodstream as blackmail. In an elevator, Krycek reveals himself to a pained Skinner and explains that he has a vaccine which could save Mulder's life. However, he will only give it if Skinner can ensure that Scully does not give birth to her baby for reasons that he does not disclose. Later, alone in his hospital bed, Miles regains consciousness and takes a shower. While doing so, his decaying flesh falls away, revealing a healthy body beneath. Miles tells Scully and Doggett that the aliens who abducted him are trying to save humanity. Scully, however, receives a lab report which reveals that Miles's DNA has substantially changed; he is now a new being. Skinner later tells Scully that there is a cure for Mulder's disease, but does not explain Krycek's demands.

From her medical findings, Scully discovers that an alien virus is keeping the abductees alive long enough to cause a radical genetic transformation to take place, similar to the one that Miles experienced. After Scully tells Doggett about the transformation, he visits Absalom, who believes that the abductees are being resurrected into aliens who will eventually conquer Earth. Skinner — torn by his decision — pulls Mulder off life support so that Krycek does not get his way. Doggett, however, catches Skinner in his attempt. Skinner explains Krycek's demands, but Doggett argues that both options are unreasonable because either Scully's child will die, or Mulder will succumb to the virus. Doggett tries to locate Krycek in the parking lot of FBI Headquarters, but Krycek nearly runs him down with a car and destroys the vaccine before escaping. Dejected, Doggett returns to the hospital and tells Skinner he was right not to trust Krycek.

Doggett finds Scully preparing Mulder for the now-destroyed vaccine; she tells Doggett that keeping Mulder on life support was hastening the virus, and that Skinner effectively saved Mulder's life by pulling him off. She states that she will be able to use a combination of antiviral drugs to kill the virus if they can get him and his temperature to stabilize. Later, Scully sits by Mulder's bedside when he regains consciousness. He stares blankly at Scully, and asks, "Who are you?" At first, Scully thinks that Mulder does not remember her. However, she quickly realizes that he is actually playing a practical joke. They laugh, and Mulder asks, "Did anybody miss me?" Scully responds with tears. Later at the FBI, Kersh expresses his disappointment that Doggett did not take his advice to abandon Mulder's case and rescinds his offer to promote him. Doggett indicates that he will continue to work on the X-Files with Scully and Mulder.

== Production ==
=== Background ===
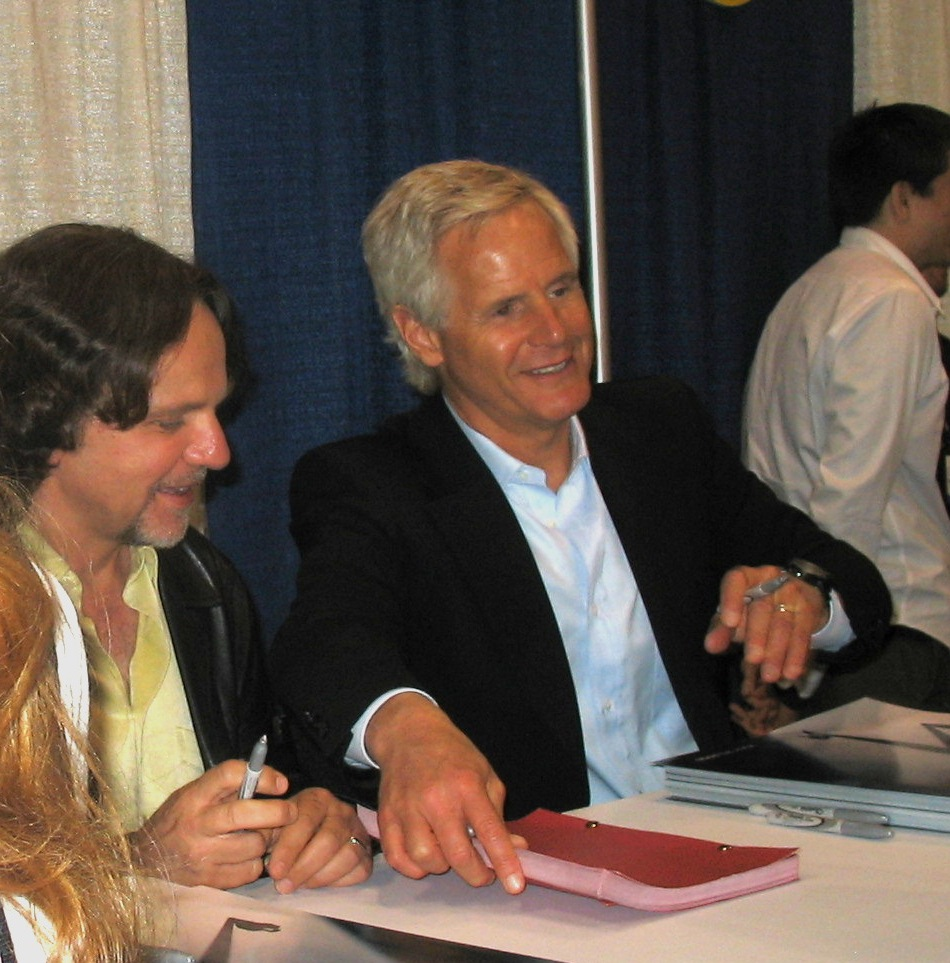
Executive producer Frank Spotnitz (left) and series creator Chris Carter (right) co-wrote the episode.

At the beginning of season seven, several cast and crew members felt it would be the show's last. Desiring closure if the show was cancelled, X-Files creator Chris Carter brought back several characters from the series' pilot for the season finale "Requiem"; this included most notably Billy Miles, played by Zachary Ansley. After an eighth season of the show was confirmed, the mythology of the ongoing alien story arc for the series changed for both practical and artistic reasons. Former series lead David Duchovny left full-time participation in the series after a lengthy lawsuit during the previous season. To replace him, the show's producers hired Robert Patrick, although Duchovny eventually agreed to return for half of season eight's episodes. As such, "Deadalive" was one of the first episodes that Duchovny participated in full-time.

=== Writing ===
Frank Spotnitz, executive producer and co-writer of "Deadalive", wanted the episode to open in a way that would shock viewers and make them watch the entire installment. He concluded that the best way to do this was to show Mulder's funeral. He felt that "the death of the hero [of the series] was shocking enough", but that no one expected "Deadalive" to blatantly open with a funeral. He elaborated, "But here we are actually burying the man ... just pushing something as far as you possibly can because the audience can't quite believe you're doing it." Because a number of actors, such as Sheila Larken (who played Scully's mother), needed to be flown in specifically for the scene, the funeral ended up being an expensive shoot. Spotnitz admitted that while it cost "a lot of money", the show "just couldn't really do Mulder's funeral without having [important characters] there". Spotnitz later called the sequence "a fun scene to write and stage" and "a great tease".

On Duchovny's request, Spotnitz and Carter wrote a larger role for Skinner than usual, giving him the "moral dilemma" of whether or not to kill Scully's unborn child or Mulder. In the end, Spotnitz called the effects of his actions, particularly the aftermath of taking Mulder off life support, a "nice sort of unexpected turn". Scully's role in "Deadalive" was partly based on the 1954 film Magnificent Obsession, in which a young man's behavior causes him to accidentally blind a woman. To atone for this turn of events, he becomes a doctor to cure her. Spotnitz noted, "that movie was on my mind and not in a good way when we were imagining Scully in this operating room where Mulder was being worked on."

=== Filming and effects ===
"Deadalive" was the second episode directed by Tony Wharmby, after the Spotnitz-penned "Via Negativa". Spotnitz later praised the directing of "Deadalive" as "fantastic". The majority of the episode—like others from seasons six to nine—was filmed in and around the Los Angeles area. Spotnitz managed to secure sufficient funds to enable the fishing trawler scene to be filmed off the Los Angeles coast, a situation with which he was "very pleased". He also said that after the series' move from Vancouver following the fifth season, the J. Edgar Hoover Building set became more important to the show than before. For this reason, the scene in which Skinner collapses was filmed almost entirely on an FBI hallway set. This sequence recalls the sixth-season episode "S.R. 819", which featured Skinner being poisoned with nanobots by Krycek.

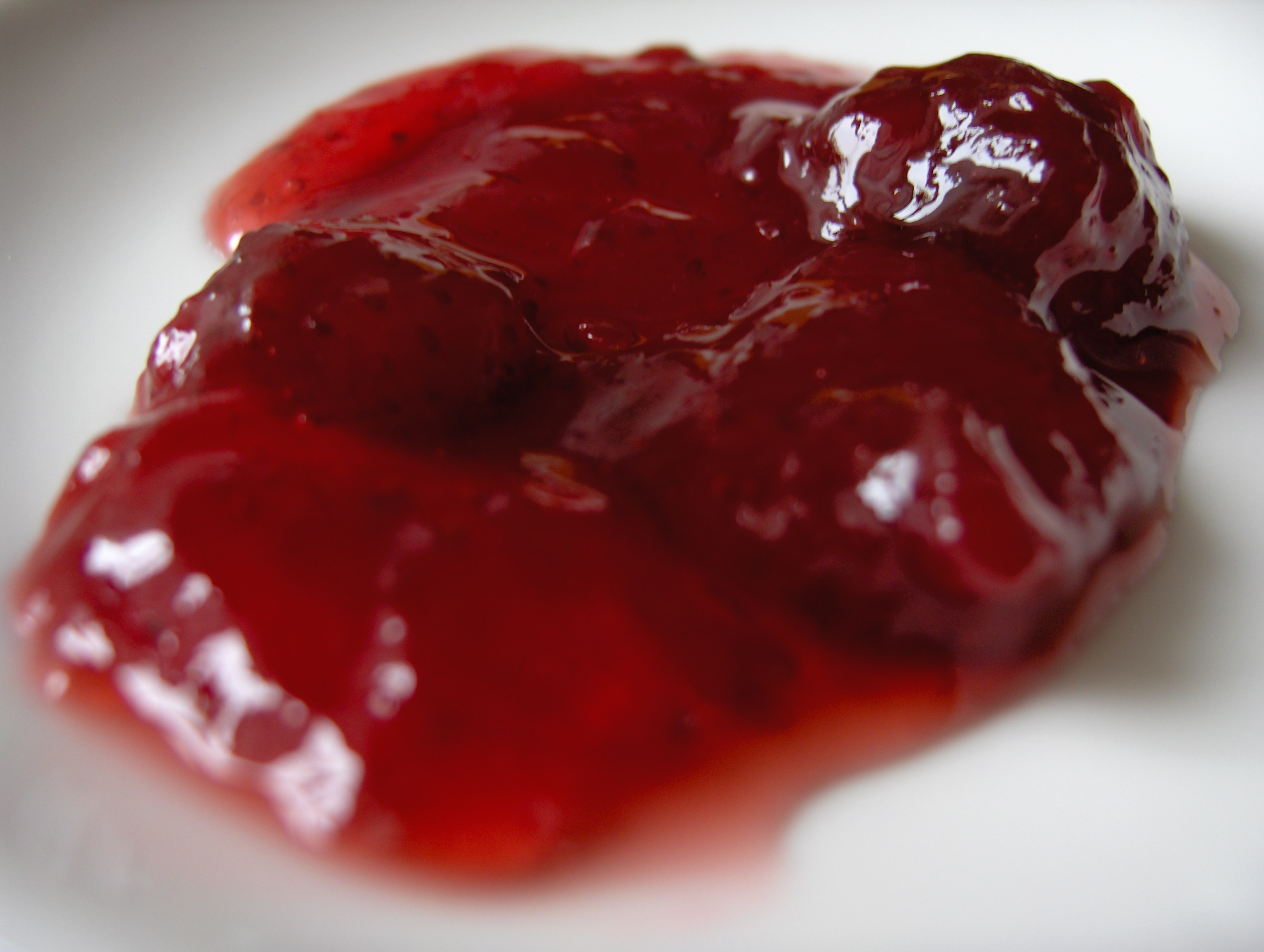
Strawberry jam, among other things, was used to create the effect of shedding flesh.

Make-up effects artist Matthew Mungle was responsible for portraying the decomposition of Mulder's and Miles's bodies. Spotnitz was particularly impressed with Miles's autopsy scene, calling it "something new to do [in the] late stage of the game". Since human bodies which have decomposed in water become "grotesque[ly] ... disfigured", Miles's body was "a toned-down version of what the reality would be." To create the scene, plaster bandages were used to create a cast of the front and back of Ansley's body; these, in turn, were used to create a fiberglass cast. This was sculpted over with water clay to create the appearance of a bloated body. Afterwards, a mold of the clay was made and a body suit created with latex. As the project proceeded, Mungle sent photos to Carter, who gave final approval. In Miles's shower scene, a mix of "red goo", which included strawberry jam, was placed on Ansley's skin. Fake skin, created from thin pieces of urethane, was then placed on top of this mixture and warm water was pumped through to create the illusion of shedding flesh. Mungle reportedly had only six days to complete the prosthetics for the episode. Mungle later noted that after being told what the scene would entail he asked, "if we can figure something out, could we show it on TV?" While the studio approved the footage, Spotnitz later called the sequence "awfully graphic"; he was surprised the sequence got past censors since it would be difficult to show in a PG-rated film.

Because of Duchovny's contract, he was only available for filming on certain days. Spotnitz commented on the irony of "paying all this money to get [Duchovny's] services for a limited time" only to have him spend most of the episode "in a hospital bed, semi-dead". He later lamented the limited access to Duchovny as it prevented the "most satisfying use of the actor or character". Due to Duchovny's unavailability, a stunt double who wore a mask of the actor's face was used when filming the scene in which Mulder is exhumed; head make-up artist Cheri Montesanto-Medcalf later noted that the effect was "brilliant, because nobody knew" it was not actually Duchovny in the casket. For the shots of the stunt double as well as of Duchovny later in the episode, she used egg whites and a facial mask to give Mulder's skin a "really cool, old, dried-up cracked skin effect."

== Themes ==
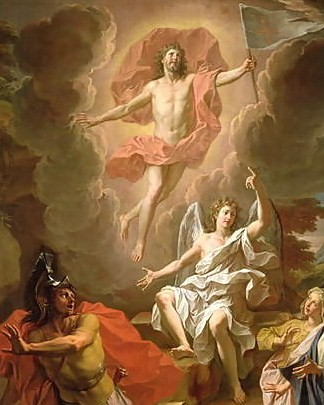
Mulder's revival has been compared to Jesus Christ's resurrection.

"Deadalive", along with other eighth-season episodes, explores the themes of "human resurrection and salvation ... disease, suffering, and healing". These emerged in the season's premiere, "Within", when Scully is shown Mulder's tombstone. The arc would continue in "The Gift", which explored the implications of Mulder's inoperable brain tumor and featured the resurrection of a temporarily deceased John Doggett. In "Deadalive", the theme of resurrection reappears in full force: Billy Miles is found dead but revives. Likewise, Mulder is buried for three months, but is brought back to life. This sub-theme would continue into the ninth season in episodes such as "Audrey Pauley".

The episode is one of many to feature Mulder as a Christlike figure. In We Want to Believe, Amy Donaldson writes that the episode is the most dramatic of Mulder's "multiple resurrections". She compares his resurrection to Jesus's, who Mulder "outdo[es]" by "staying in the grave for three months instead of simply three days." During Mulder's funeral the minister reads John 11:25–26: "Whosoever liveth and believeth in me shall never die". According to scripture, Jesus spoke these words when he raised Lazarus of Bethany from the dead, and many biblical scholars note that the verse foreshadows his own resurrection. Previously, in the seventh-season's "Millennium", the verse was used by a necromancer, but for the wrong reason. The necromancer wanted to raise the dead by reciting the verse, but only their bodies returned as zombies. In "Deadalive", Mulder returns from the dead in both mind and body.

Donaldson also draws parallels between the eighth season of the show and the Gospels, and between the ninth season and the Acts of the Apostles. In the Gospels, Jesus is brought back to life but then leaves his followers, allowing them to spread his message; this is recorded in Acts, the fifth book of the New Testament. In The X-Files, Mulder follows a similar course. After returning to life in "Deadalive", he investigates several cases before disappearing at the beginning of season nine in "Nothing Important Happened Today". During the ninth season, his quest is continued by Scully, Doggett and Monica Reyes.

== Reception ==
=== Ratings and release ===
"Deadalive" premiered on American television on April 1, 2001. The episode earned a Nielsen household rating of 7.3 with an 11-percent share, meaning it was viewed by 7.3 percent of all television-equipped households, and 11 percent of those watching television. It was watched by 12.4 million viewers overall. It won for Outstanding Makeup For a Series at the 53rd Primetime Emmy Awards in 2001; it would be the last Emmy win for The X-Files. "Deadalive" was first released as a single-episode DVD in the United Kingdom on August 6, 2001, for Region 2. On November 4, 2003, the episode was released as part of the eighth season DVD box set. The episode was later included on The X-Files Mythology, Volume 4 – Super Soldiers, a DVD collection of episodes in the Super Soldiers story arc.

=== Reviews ===
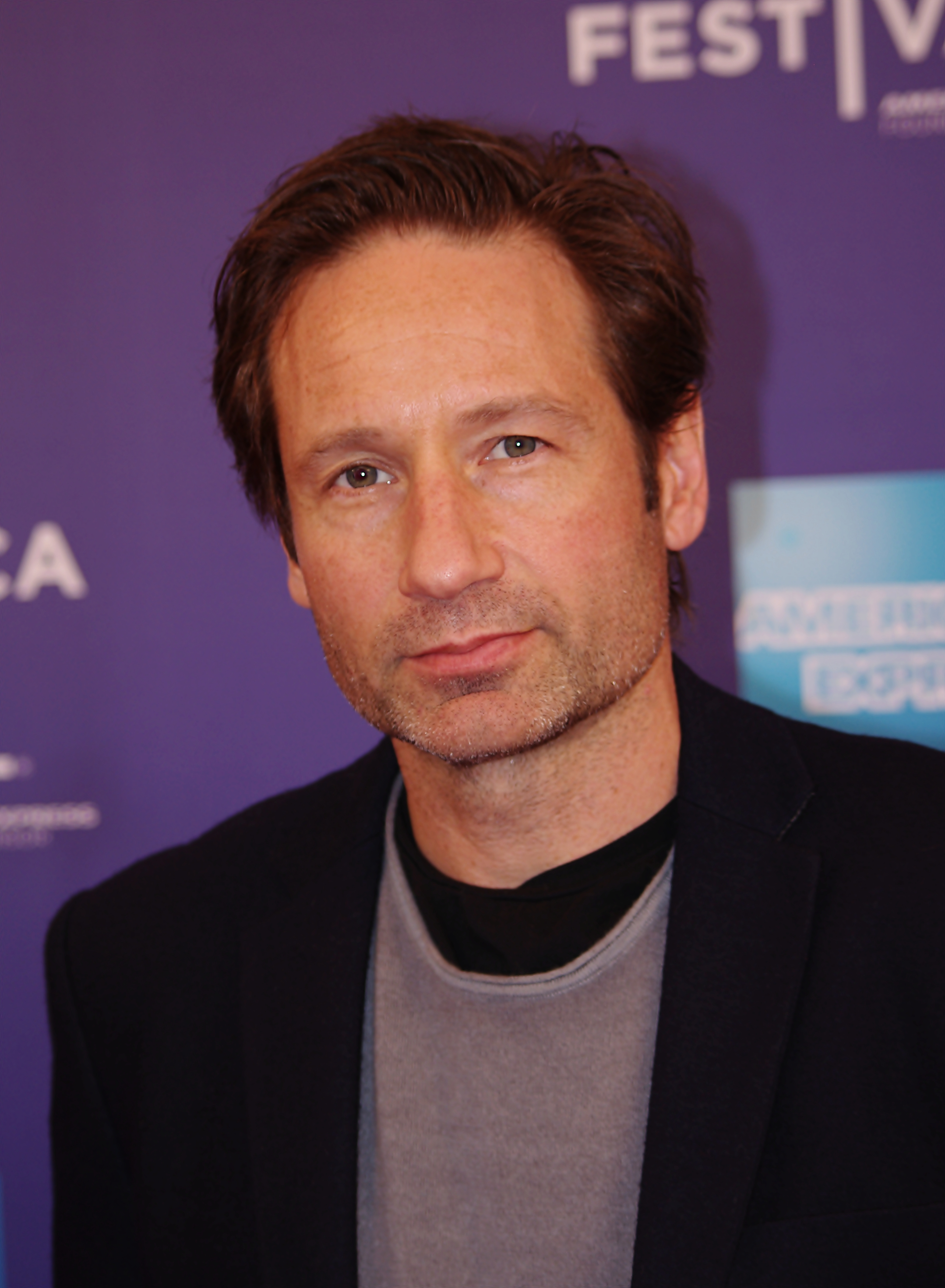
Many critics were happy with the return of David Duchovny as Fox Mulder.

The episode received mixed reviews; many critics praised the return of Fox Mulder, although others felt that the episode had various plot holes and was overcomplicated. Robert Shearman, in his book Wanting to Believe: A Critical Guide to The X-Files, Millennium & The Lone Gunmen, gave "Deadalive" a full five stars, applauding the episode for being a "slice of sci-fi hokum, with action scenes, bits of grisly horror [and] a reexamination of the show's mythology".

Likewise George Avalos and Michael Liedtke of the Contra Costa Times praised the on-screen return of characters such as Mulder and Krycek. They felt so many eighth-season episodes worked well because "Chris Carter seems to be taking an even more active role in the series that is most closely identified with him." Zack Handlen of The A.V. Club awarded the episode a "B+" and wrote that, "it’s a measure of a show’s effectiveness to see how convincingly the writers can threaten a major character, and have that character’s subsequent survival not be a cheat", in regards to Mulder's resurrection. He applauded the fact that the episode is suspenseful, even though the ending has a certain inevitability. Handlen also positively commented on both Anderson's performance—although pointing out that she "is largely pushed to the side for the majority" of the episode—and Lea's reappearance, noting that "it's always fun to see Krycek". However, he argued that the conclusion "makes less sense the more you think about it", but that the final scene with Mulder and Scully "makes up for the contrivance."

Not all reviews were positive. Paula Vitaris from CFQ gave the episode one-and-a-half stars out of four. She criticized its storyline, noting a number of plot holes—such as Mulder's survival for three months without food or water—and the fact that his body was neither autopsied nor embalmed. Tom Kessenich, in Examination: An Unauthorized Look at Seasons 6–9 of the X-Files, called the plot "wooden and convoluted" and felt that it "set the stage for ... the countdown toward the end of Fox Mulder's time on The X-Files". However, he complimented Anderson on her "effective" performance.

SFX magazine ranked the episode as the sixth "Top 10 Resurrections", reasoning that it allowed Mulder to be around for what was then the series finale a year later. However, the magazine felt his return made "poor Robert Patrick’s Agent Doggett a bit superfluous", and that the plot was rather complicated. In a list comparing Fringe episodes with those of the X-Files, UGO Networks writer Alex Zalben named "Deadalive" as the best resurrection story, beating out Fringe's "Unearthed". Zalben cited the "emotional reunion at the end" as the deciding factor, though "both [episodes] kind of suck".
