= The Gift (The X-Files) =

- The X-Files episode
- Episode no.: Season 8 Episode 11
- Directed by: Kim Manners
- Written by: Frank Spotnitz
- Production code: 8ABX11
- Original air date: February 4, 2001
- Running time: 44 minutes

Guest appearances
- Tom Braidwood as Melvin Frohike; Dean Haglund as Richard Langly; Bruce Harwood as John Fitzgerald Byers; Caroline Lagerfelt as Rustic Woman; Michael McGrady as Sheriff Kurt Frey; Jordan Marder as Soul Eater; Mitch Pileggi as Walter Skinner; Natalie Radford as Marie Hangemuhl; Justin Williams as Paul Hangemuhl

Episode chronology
← Previous "Badlaa"	Next → "Medusa"
- The X-Files season 8

"The Gift" is the eleventh episode of the eighth season of the American science fiction television series The X-Files. It premiered on the Fox network in the United States on February 4, 2001. The episode was written by Frank Spotnitz and directed by Kim Manners. "The Gift" has elements of both a "Monster-of-the-Week" episode, and an entry in the series' mythology. The episode received a Nielsen rating of 8.8 and was viewed by 14.6 million viewers. Overall, the episode received largely mixed reviews from television critics; while many appreciated the focus on Fox Mulder's (David Duchovny) absence, others felt that the plot revelations were unnaturally forced into the show.

The season centers on FBI special agents Dana Scully (Gillian Anderson) and her new partner John Doggett (Robert Patrick)—following the alien abduction of her former partner, Mulder—who work on cases linked to the paranormal, called X-Files. In this episode, Doggett traces Mulder's movements shortly before his abduction, learning of his attempts to seek a cure for his terminal brain disease.

"The Gift" featured the first appearance of Duchovny since the season's opening story; he had elected not to return to the show as a full-time main character following the season seven finale. The episode was written by Spotnitz and was based on folklore surrounding the soul eater. Gillian Anderson does not appear in the episode, save for stock footage, due to an agreement to allow her to spend more time with her daughter. The episode has been analyzed for its themes of death and resurrection, its use of a medicine wheel as a motif, and it has been compared and contrasted with the fourth season episode "Leonard Betts".

== Plot ==
=== Background ===
FBI special agent Fox Mulder (David Duchovny) is currently missing, having been abducted by aliens in the seventh season finale, "Requiem." His partner Dana Scully (Gillian Anderson) has been working with Agent John Doggett (Robert Patrick) in order to locate him. Shortly after Mulder was abducted, Scully and Doggett learned that he had been suffering from a brain tumor and was nearing his demise. After a false lead in the Arizona desert early in the year, Doggett has been assigned to the X-Files division, but he has continued his search for Mulder, despite a lack of definite leads.

=== Events ===
A man—whose face is hidden from the camera—drives up to and enters a house, which has an ominous symbol drawn in blood on the door. When he's inside, a humanoid creature approaches a woman but the mysterious man shoots the creature three times. As he returns to his car his identity is finally revealed: Fox Mulder.

Doggett investigates a possible lead into Mulder's disappearance in Squamash, Pennsylvania. Apparently, in the spring of 2000, Mulder visited the town searching for something to cure his terminal brain disease that he received via exposure to an alien artifact. Doggett is informed by the local sheriff (Michael McGrady) that Mulder was investigating a case involving Marie Hangemuhl (Natalie Radford). Marie was told by her sister about a Native American legend of a creature that lives in the woods. While interrogating the Hangemuhls in the present, Doggett learns that Marie is suffering from terminal renal failure. As he is leaving, he also notices plastered-over gunshot holes in their wall. Later, at Mulder's apartment, Doggett finds a gun he kept hidden under his sink. Meanwhile, in Squamash, a backhoe digs at a stone circle located in the town cemetery. Later that night, the townsfolk show up at a cabin in the woods, demanding to a rustic woman (Caroline Lagerfelt) living there that "it" be sent out. A creature attempts to escape, but it is captured.

Doggett and Walter Skinner (Mitch Pileggi) return to Squamash and ask the sheriff about the murder of an unidentified transient, who Doggett believes was killed by Mulder. Doggett and Skinner travel to the cemetery and discover that the grave dug up by the backhoe earlier is that of the transient. The two find the casket empty, but Doggett notices that the transient dug himself out of his own coffin. The sheriff arrives with the creature—revealed to be a soul eater, which subsists off human disease—at the Hangemuhl home, where the symbol in blood is on the door again. The hideous creature opens its jaws wide and bites Marie. Doggett suggests to Skinner that Mulder shot someone to protect her from the man who was supposed to be in that grave. Meanwhile, deep underground, the creature vomits what appears to be the visceral remains of Marie into a person-shaped mold in the soil.

Doggett goes off alone to see the woman who guarded the creature in the woods. The woman implies that Mulder, feeling sorry for the creature, was trying to euthanize it, not save Marie. Doggett hears a noise and finds a trap door leading into the tunnels. Underground, he finds Marie and takes her to the hospital. He reports to Skinner that her kidneys have healed spontaneously. Doggett returns to the woman who watches over the creature; after recoiling at its ugliness, the woman explains that it looks the way it does because it takes the sickness of others into itself, while healing them in the process. Doggett decides to take the creature away from society, which only uses it. However, Doggett is killed after the sheriff and his men, who refuse to relinquish the soul eater or even regard it as more than a thing, arrive and shoot him in the back. Doggett is promptly buried but later awakens in the tunnels. In the dark corner of the cavern, the woman weeps beside the dead soul eater. She reveals that, by eating Doggett's death, it has finally been allowed to die.

Back at FBI Headquarters, Doggett is struggling to write his report. When Skinner checks in on him, he encourages Doggett to not submit a report, as it would contradict Mulder's earlier report and damage his, Scully's, and Doggett's own reputation. Doggett protests that Scully had no knowledge of the events, but Skinner reminds him that it would take months to clear her name, and that it is enough that the two of them know the truth about what happened.

== Production ==
=== Background and writing ===
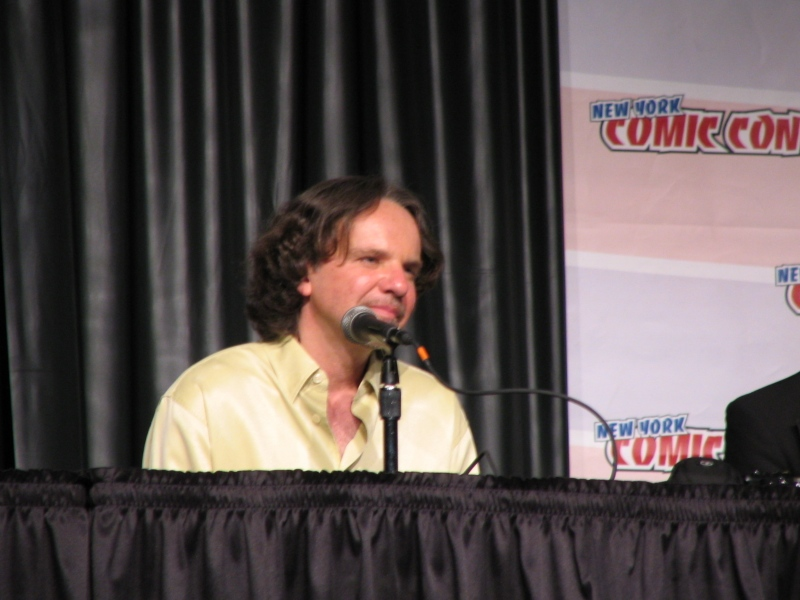
"The Gift" was written by executive producer Frank Spotnitz.

"The Gift" featured the first substantial appearance from Duchovny as Mulder since the season openers "Within" and "Without". After settling his contract dispute with Fox, Duchovny quit full-time participation in the show after the seventh season. In order to explain Mulder's absence, Duchovny's character was abducted by aliens in the seventh-season finale, "Requiem". After several rounds of contractual discussions, Duchovny agreed to return for a total of 11 season eight episodes. Series creator Chris Carter later argued that Mulder's absences from the series did not affect the series, noting that "there are characters who can be powerful as absent centers, as Mulder was through the eighth and ninth seasons."

The episode was written by executive producer Frank Spotnitz and was intended as a morality tale. Spotnitz made sure that the episode had an explicit purpose and reason, and he noted, "If you're going to depart from literal reality as most of us know—if you're going to go into supernatural—as a writer you have to ask yourself 'Why? ... And if you don't really have a point or reason, your story's probably not going to be very good." Despite largely being concerned with a "Monster-of-the-Week", "The Gift" also fits in the series' overarching mythology. The Complete X-Files book, released in 2008, considers the episode part of the overall myth arc, however, it was not included on the 2005 DVD release The X-Files Mythology, Volume 4 – Super Soldiers.

The episode touches upon and explores Mulder's brain disease, a plot device that was introduced in the season opener "Within". This was largely a retcon placed in the series after the fact. The series rationalized this revelation with the fact that, due to Mulder's exposure to the black oil in the fourth season episodes "Tunguska" and "Terma" and his forced brain operation by The Smoking Man (William B. Davis) in the seventh-season episode "The Sixth Extinction II: Amor Fati", his brain developed an incurable disease that was slowly killing him. In fact, Mulder's "one-week recovery" from his brain surgery was a point of criticism when "The Sixth Extinction II: Amor Fati" initially aired in 1999.

=== Filming ===
"The Gift" was directed by Kim Manners, and it marked his third directing credit for the season, after the opening two-parter "Within" and "Without". Due to Duchovny's limited availability, Mulder's appearances were limited to flashbacks. This technique had previously been used during the filming of the episode "Per Manum", which—although it was aired after "The Gift"—was filmed before this episode.

The majority of the episode—like the rest of seasons six, seven, eight and nine—was filmed in and around the Los Angeles, California, area. The scenes taking place at the soul eater's residence were filmed on Ventura Farms, a California horse establishment and filming location near the town of Thousand Oaks. The filming location had previously been used for the earlier eight season episode "Patience", for scenes taking place at the undertaker's residence. The short scene featuring The Lone Gunmen was filmed on the set of their spin-off series, the eponymous The Lone Gunmen. Although the bulk of the episode was filmed by director Manners, the snippet of the Gunmen was directed by Bryan Spicer, who directed several of The Lone Gunmen episodes, as well as the Gunmen-centric sixth season entry "Three of a Kind".

The episode was written to not require Gillian Anderson at all. As a result, the finished episode only features stock footage of Scully from "Within", and Anderson was not required to film any new scenes. Anderson later revealed that she was extremely grateful for this and other "Doggett-centric" episodes, because they provided her time to spend time with her daughter, Piper Maru, who was attending school in Canada. Anderson insisted that the show both understand her situation and make accommodations: in an interview, she explained, "I was determined that they respect that I would work for three weeks and then have two or three weeks off to go and be with her. So they agreed to that, and that was important to me. I'd never had that before on the show."

"The Gift" was the first episode that make-up artist Matthew W. Mungle's company worked on for The X-Files. The soul eater was a combination of actor Jordan Marder in make-up, and a silicone dummy that had an extendable mouth and movable teeth.

== Themes ==
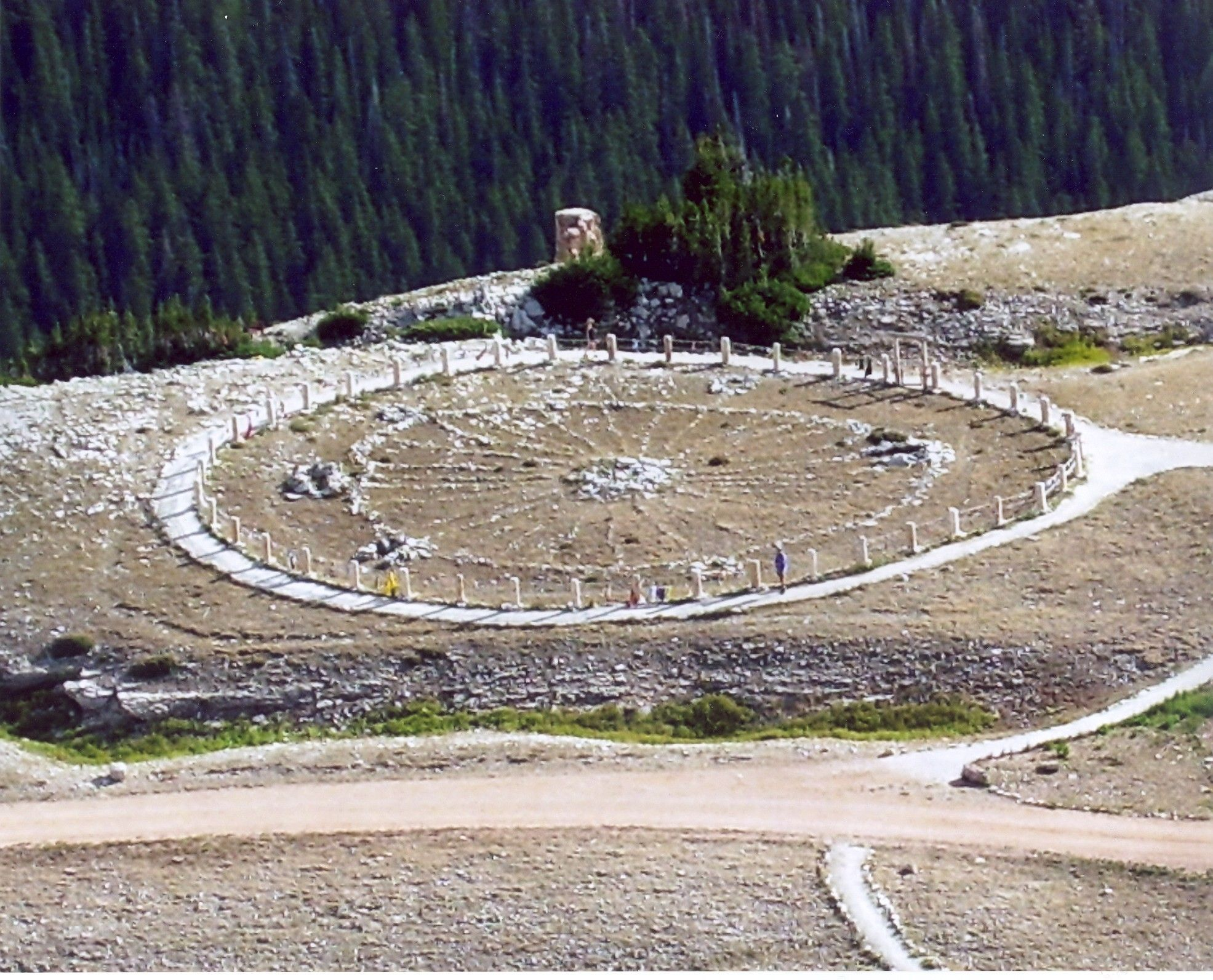
The episode makes prominent use of a medicine wheel (left), which has stylistically been compared to the program symbol for The X-Files (right).

As The X-Files entered into its eighth season, "human resurrection and salvation" as well as "disease, suffering, and healing" became an increasingly central focus of the show. "The Gift", along with various other episodes during the eighth season of the show, would be the first to explore themes of death and resurrection. These sub-themes emerged in the season premiere "Within" when Scully is shown Mulder's tombstone. In "The Gift", the theme is explored further; not only is Doggett mortally wounded and then resurrected, the story behind Mulder's inoperable brain tumor is also explored. In "Deadalive", the theme reappears in full-force: Billy Miles is found dead but resurrects. Likewise, Mulder is buried for three months but returns to life. This sub-theme would continue well into the ninth season, in entries such as "Audrey Pauley".

The episode makes heavy use of a medicine wheel. Doggett first discovers this symbol on the unknown grave that he digs up. The wheel is a Native American symbol common in folklore that is considered sacred; although the size and shape varies, it usually consists of a central stone (or a cairn), surrounded by an outer ring (or rings) of stones, with at least two lines of rocks radiating from the center. The stone usage has been "mired in controversy", but most Native American scholars agree that it represents the "synthesis and wholeness, including concepts of renewal and rebirth". In the episode, the symbol takes the form of an "X"—making it "identical to The X-Files program symbol".

Amy Donaldson, in her book We Want to Believe contrasted the soul eater from "The Gift" to Leonard Betts, a "Monster-of-the-Week" character from the fourth season episode of the same name. In the episode, Mulder and Scully investigate the supposed death and regeneration of an emergency medical technician (EMT) named Leonard Betts, a mutant who subsists on and can detect cancer in others, as well as regenerate severed body parts. Donaldson reasons that Betts' condition, in which he is "riddled with cancer" but can "see the sickness within people", is a metaphor for someone who "has let sin or evil become the regular course of life". Although Betts can detect and consume the illness, his motives are derived from "his own self appetite". Donaldson argues that the soul eater is the polar opposite of Betts because it takes an illness in order to help a person, even though it hurts itself in the process. In other words, the soul eater is altruistic, whereas Betts is selfish.

== Reception ==
=== Ratings ===
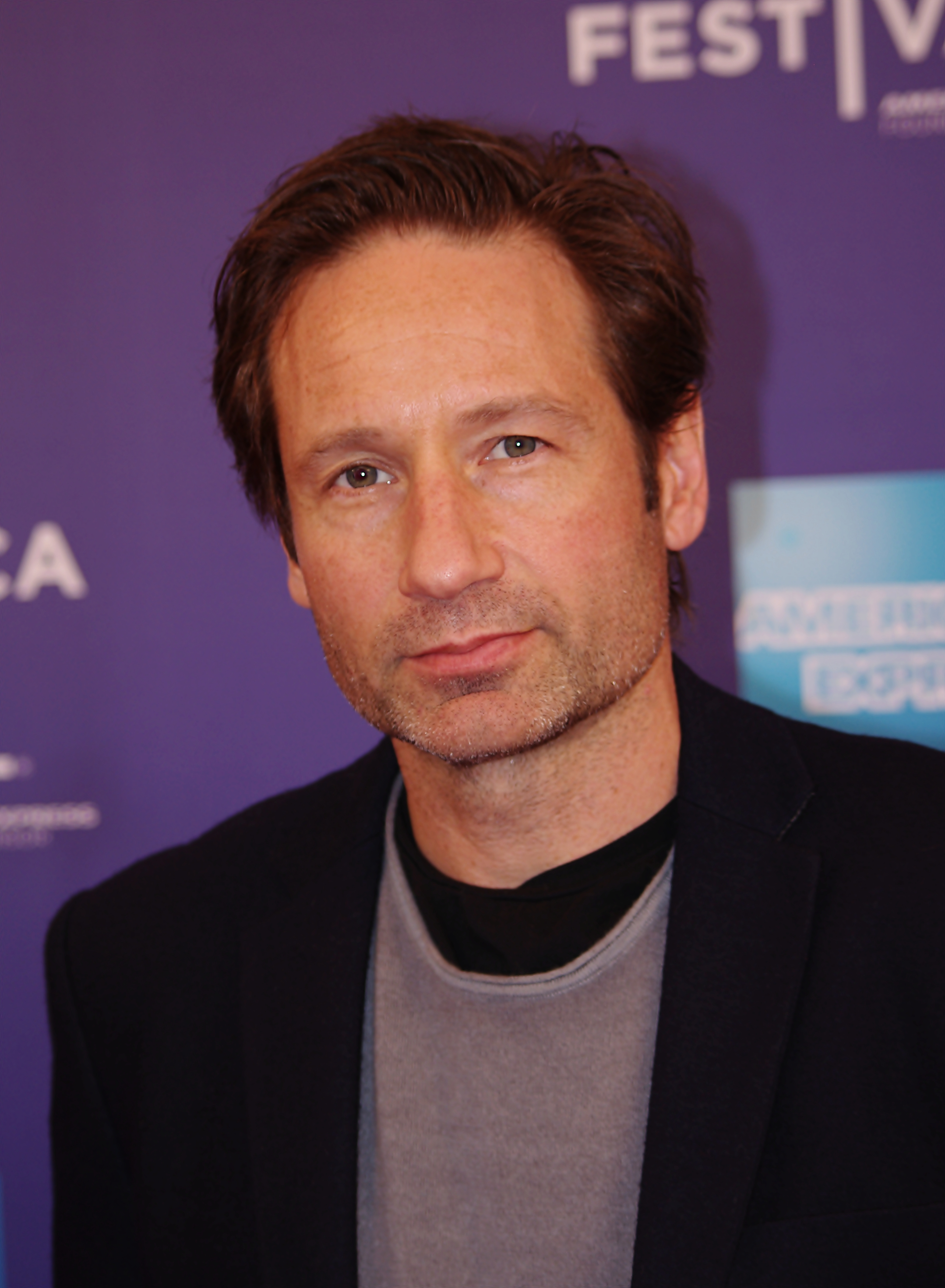
Fox heavily promoted the episode due to the return of David Duchovny as Fox Mulder.

"The Gift" first premiered on Fox in the United States on February 4, 2001. The episode earned a Nielsen household rating of 8.8 (meaning that it was seen by 8.8% of the nation's estimated households). The episode was seen by 14.6 million viewers overall. The episode ranked as the 35th most-watched episode for the week ending February 4. On November 4, 2003, the episode was released as part of the eighth season DVD box set.

=== Reviews ===
Critical reception to the episode was largely mixed. Zack Handlen of The A.V. Club awarded the episode an "A" and called it "a great monster story, and my favorite of what I've seen of [season eight] so far." He argued that the episode was "so effective" because it "isn't just the inversion of the monster/normal personal dichotomy; the show has pulled that trick before, and while it tries to play coy about the true nature of the soul eater at first, it's not hard to recognize who the real villain is." Handlen also wrote that the episode both "forces the audience to identify more strongly with Doggett" and made good use of Anderson's absence. Meghan Deans of Tor.com felt that, while "the tale of the soul eater may have been a little rushed and a little sloppy", the episode itself "has a spark to it [which is the] spark of the absent, the drive of the missing. The feeling that we’re all here for a reason, and that the show wants to live."

George Avalos and Michael Liedtke of the Contra Costa Times called the entry "one of the season's more engaging episodes" and wrote positively of the "intriguing possibilities" that it set up for the final part of the season. They were also positive about the manner in which Doggett and Mulder were able to connect in "some mystical way". However, Avalos and Liedtke were critical of the episode's placement, noting that it would have worked better had it been the "fourth or fifth episode of the season", as opposed to the eighth. Furthermore, they negatively wrote about the revelation that Mulder was suffering from a terminal brain disease, calling it a "monumental story" curve that did not bother "to connect all the dots behind" it.

Robert Shearman, in his book Wanting to Believe: A Critical Guide to The X-Files, Millennium & The Lone Gunmen, rated the episode two stars out of five. While calling the episode "different" from others in the series, Shearman felt that the story involving Mulder was "not very satisfying". In addition, he criticized the decision to have Skinner and Doggett suppress the truth in the end, arguing that this plot point goes against the spirit of the series. Paula Vitaris from Cinefantastique gave the episode a negative review and awarded it one-and-a-half stars out of four. Vitaris criticized Doggett's role, noting that "you would think after this even he would become a raging believer, but no, he's not changed one bit." Marisa Guthrie of the Boston Herald derided the fact that Duchovny was given such little amounts of screen time. Furthermore, she was critical that Doggett remained a skeptic at the end of the episode.
