= Within (The X-Files) =

- The X-Files episode
- Episode no.: Season 8 Episode 1
- Directed by: Kim Manners
- Written by: Chris Carter
- Production code: 8ABX01
- Original air date: November 5, 2000
- Running time: 44 minutes

Guest appearances
- Mitch Pileggi as Walter Skinner; James Pickens, Jr. as Alvin Kersh; Kirk B. R. Woller as Gene Crane; Tom Braidwood as Melvin Frohike; Dean Haglund as Richard Langly; Bruce Harwood as John Fitzgerald Byers; Jeff Gulka as Gibson Praise; Sheila Larken as Margaret Scully; Jo-Ann Dean as Secretary; Christine Firkins as Thea Sprecher; Marc Gomes as Danny Mosley; Bryan Greenberg as Order Taker; Jonathan Palmer as Principal; Dondre Whitfield as Agent; Marty Zagon as Mr. Coeben

Episode chronology
← Previous "Requiem"	Next → "Without"
- The X-Files season 8

"Within" is the eighth season premiere of the science fiction television series The X-Files. The episode first aired in the United States on November 5, 2000, on the Fox Network. It was written by executive producer and series creator Chris Carter, and directed by Kim Manners. The episode earned a Nielsen rating of 9.5 and was watched by 15.87 million viewers, marking a slight increase from the previous season's finale "Requiem". "Within" was largely well-received by critics, although some fans felt alienated by the addition of Robert Patrick to the cast.

The show centers on FBI special agents Fox Mulder (David Duchovny) and Dana Scully (Gillian Anderson) who work on cases linked to the paranormal, called X-Files. In this episode—continuing from the seventh season finale "Requiem" when Mulder was abducted by aliens who are planning to colonize Earth—an FBI taskforce is organized to hunt for Mulder but Scully suspects the taskforce leader, Special Agent John Doggett (Patrick), and instead chooses to search for her lost partner with Walter Skinner (Mitch Pileggi). Scully and Skinner travel to Arizona, only to be followed by Doggett's task force. There, they find Gibson Praise (Jeff Gulka) and someone who they believe may very well be Mulder.

"Within" was a story milestone for the series. It introduced several new character changes for the season, including the departure of Mulder and the inclusion of Doggett as a main character to the cast. The episode was written as a way to both explain Mulder's absence as well as appease fans who would otherwise lament the loss of Duchovny. "Within" also marked the first major change to the opening credits since the show first started, with new images and updated photos for David Duchovny and Gillian Anderson, and the addition of Robert Patrick. "Within" has been analyzed due to its themes of death and resurrection. In addition, the experiments performed on Mulder after his abduction have been thematically compared to the Crucifixion of Jesus.

== Plot ==
Dana Scully (Gillian Anderson) has been deeply distraught since Fox Mulder (David Duchovny) was abducted by aliens. One morning, she arrives in her partner's office to find it being searched by FBI agents. Scully subsequently learns that the Bureau's newly promoted deputy director, Alvin Kersh (James Pickens, Jr.), has launched a manhunt in search for Mulder. The investigation is being led by an FBI special agent named John Doggett. Scully and Walter Skinner (Mitch Pileggi) are taken to the task force's field office to be questioned, despite protests that they would be the most qualified to lead the manhunt themselves. As Skinner is being interrogated, Scully is accosted by an unnamed person who starts asking her about Mulder. When Scully finds out that he is actually Doggett (Robert Patrick), she angrily throws water in his face and leaves.

Back at her apartment, Scully runs a background check of Doggett on her computer, learning about his background as a former NYPD detective. She feels sick and leaves the computer, and later on calls her mom, Margaret (Sheila Larken). When she realizes her phone is tapped, she looks outside the window to see if anyone is out there. She angrily calls Doggett to protest him monitoring her phone conversations, which he seems genuinely surprised about. She notices a mysterious man and runs into the hall to pursue him, but meets her landlord Mr. Coeben, who claims he had seen Mulder.

Meanwhile, Skinner visits the Lone Gunmen, who are monitoring UFO activity in the U.S. in the hopes of tracking down Mulder. Skinner later finds out that someone has used Mulder's FBI pass to gain access to the X-Files, and that the Bureau task force considers him the main suspect. Meanwhile, Doggett has gathered enough evidence to track Mulder's whereabouts before his so-called abduction, discovering that Mulder was dying and had his name engraved in his family's gravestone to mark his death in 2000. Later on, more evidence of high UFO activity in Clifton, Arizona, is found by the Lone Gunmen. Concurrently, Doggett receives information about Gibson Praise (Jeff Gulka) when someone slips his file under his door.

Scully and Skinner leave for Arizona without giving any of their information to Doggett. At the same time, Doggett believes that to find Mulder they must first find the whereabouts of Praise. They locate him at a remote school for the deaf in the town of Flemingtown. By the time Doggett's task force arrives, Gibson has already escaped via a window and is leaving for a desert hill top with another person: Mulder.

== Production ==
=== Casting and development ===
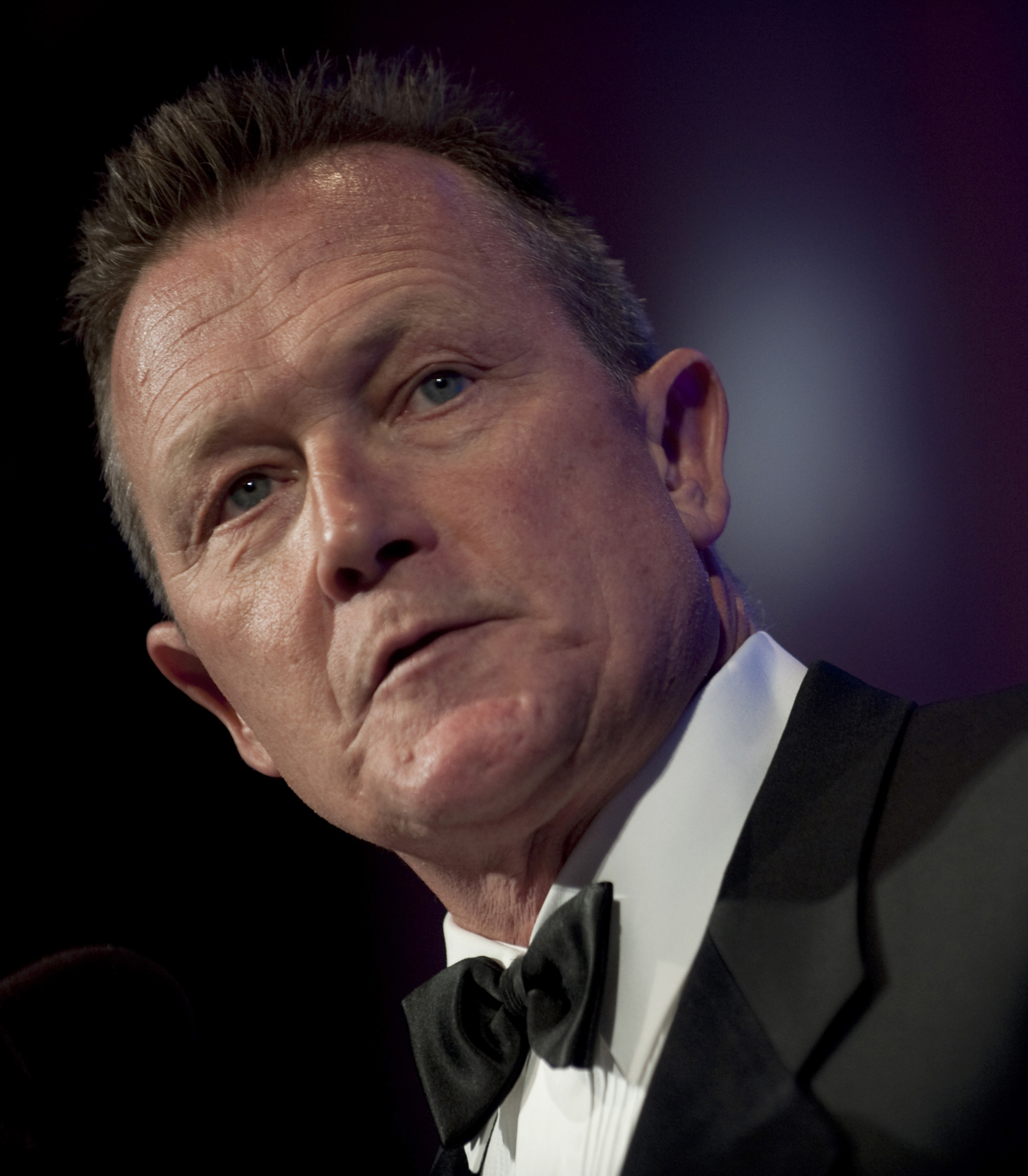
Robert Patrick (pictured in 2009) made his first appearance with "Within."

The seventh season was a time of closure for The X-Files. Characters within the show were written out, including The Smoking Man (William B. Davis) and Mulder's mother (Rebecca Toolan), and several plot threads were resolved, including the fate of Fox Mulder's sister Samantha. After settling his contract dispute, Duchovny quit full-time participation in the show after the seventh season, contributing to uncertainties over the likelihood of an eighth season. Carter and most fans felt the show was at its natural endpoint with Duchovny's departure, and so Carter wrote "Requiem", the final episode of season seven, as a possible series finale. But seeing as how there was still interest from the Fox network in making an eighth season, Carter also sought to construct the finale in such a way that it could segue into another season. However, the producers found it difficult to convincingly write Duchovny's character out of the script, and explain Mulder's absence in the episodes of the upcoming season. Eventually, it was decided that Mulder's character would be abducted by aliens in "Requiem", thereby leaving it open for the actor's return in 11 episodes the following year.

When an eighth season was green-lit, Carter introduced a new central character to replace Mulder: Doggett. More than 100 actors auditioned for the role, including Lou Diamond Phillips, Hart Bochner, and Bruce Campbell. In particular, Campbell, following his involvement with the sixth season episode "Terms of Endearment", was considered, but, due to a contractual obligation, could not take any work during the filming of his series Jack of All Trades. On potentially being cast as the series regular, Campbell mused, "I had worked on an X-Files episode before, and I think they sort of remembered me from that. It was nice to be involved in that – even if you don't get it, it's nice to hang out at that party." Later in Campbell's satirical autobiography Make Love! The Bruce Campbell Way (2005), he joked that Patrick "stiffed him out of the role". In the end, the producers eventually chose Robert Patrick. Reportedly, Patrick was cast due to his role in Terminator 2: Judgment Day (1991), as Fox believed he would attract 18- to 35-year-old males to the show. In fact, Fox executives reported a 10 percent overall increase in this demographic, solely due to Patrick's casting.

=== Writing and filming ===
Carter was inspired to write the scene in which Scully splashes water into Doggett's face, since he was aware that Patrick would be facing opposition from some members of the fan community. The scene was even the first filmed, in order to truly introduce Patrick to the series. After the conclusion of The X-Files in 2002, Patrick commented that this part of the episode had been his favorite scene in the series, and admitted that he could not think of a better way to introduce his character. Tom Braidwood, who appears in this episode as long-running recurring character Frohike, similarly remarked that the first meeting of Doggett and Scully was one of his favorite scenes from the entire series. Both Robert Patrick and the director of this episode, Kim Manners, felt that it was the perfect way to introduce John Doggett, and that Patrick injected a new "sense of energy" into the show, since it had basically used the same characters for the first seven years.

Because the script of the episode does not specify the identity of the person who slides a file about Gibson Praise under Doggett's door, Kim Manners later had to ask the writers who the mysterious visitor was; the director was eventually told by Chris Carter and Frank Spotnitz that the unseen person was actually Kersh. Robert Patrick asked the same question of Manners, but the director—not yet sure of the answer himself and hoping to avoid looking foolish—never gave the actor an answer. Patrick thought the reason that Manners was being purposefully secretive was that the director wanted Patrick to still "be in wonderment" as to the mysterious visitor's identity, thereby aiding his performance. On the audio commentary for "Within", Manners teased Patrick that the reason he had not answered the question was that he had not liked Patrick at the time. Kersh's actions are later revealed and explained in the ninth season premiere "Nothing Important Happened Today".

On the episode's commentary, Patrick revealed that he was "nervous" for the shooting of the episode, since he was a big fan of The X-Files before becoming a part of its cast. Before shooting the episode, Carter reminded Patrick various times that he had to be in "good shape". The majority of the episode—like the rest of seasons six, seven, eight and nine—was filmed in and around the Los Angeles, California, area. The ending of the episode, as well as a majority of its follow-up "Without" were filmed at Split Mountain in Anza-Borrego State Park. According to producer Paul Rabwin, an "incredible heat wave" hit the area during the shooting, resulting in terrible filming conditions. In the desert, the cast and crew were informed that there was a "one in twenty-five" chance that someone would be bit by a rattlesnake. Pileggi later joked that during the filming of his scenes all he could think about was stumbling upon a snake. Jim Engh, a member of the production crew of The X-Files, died during the filming of this episode via electrocution, an accident that injured six other crew members. This episode was dedicated to his memory.

The original opening visual sequence for the show had been made in 1993 for the first season and remained unchanged until "Within". The opening sequence then was modified to include new images, updated FBI badge photos for Duchovny and Anderson, as well as the addition of Patrick to the main cast. (Duchovny would only be featured in the opening credits when he appeared in an episode.) The opening also contains images that allude to Scully's pregnancy and, according to Frank Spotnitz, show an "abstract" explanation for Mulder's absence, with him falling into an eye.

Most of the shots of Mulder being tortured were created using special and practical effects, as well as creative camera techniques. For the scene in which Mulder's face is restrained by hooks, make-up artist Matthew W. Mungle, who created special cheek prosthetics that were then attached to Duchovny (whom series makeup supervisor Cheri Montasanto-Medcalf later noted "sat pretty good through all that"). Likewise, for the scene in which the Colonists use a small laser-guided drill to bore into the roof of Mulder's mouth, visual effects supervisor John Wash placed "weird lens effects" over shots of the laser to give the scene "an alien, other-world-like quality." This scene also called for a shot of the device approaching the camera, which posed a challenge to the series' cinematographers because the device was so small. In a behind-the-scenes interview, supervising producer Paul Rabwin explained that he had the camera operators use "a very, very highly magnified lens" to capture the shot: "[The scene] was very, very scary, Rabwin stated. "We ended up putting some really cool sound effects in there, little servos and motors."

== Themes ==
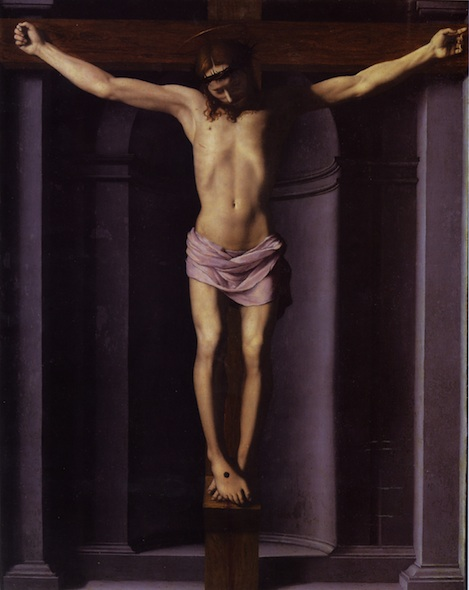
The experiments performed on Mulder after his abduction have been compared to the Crucifixion of Jesus.

As The X-Files entered into its eighth season, "human resurrection and salvation" as well as "disease, suffering, and healing" became an increasingly central focus of the show. "Within", along with various other episodes during the eighth season of the show, would be the first to explore themes of birth, death and resurrection. The sub-theme of birth first emerged in this episode during Scully's opening dream of an abducted Mulder, which "invok[es] strong birth imagery of the amniotic sack [sic] and fluid." Then later in the episode, the themes of death and resurrection are touched upon when Scully is shown Mulder's tombstone. This arc would continue in "The Gift", where Mulder's inoperable brain tumor and the resurrection of John Doggett is explored. In "Deadalive", the theme reappears in full-force: Billy Miles is found dead but resurrects, Mulder is buried for three months, and later, is brought back to life. This sub-theme would continue well into the ninth season, in entries such as "Audrey Pauley".

The episode is one of many to feature Mulder as a Christ-like figure. These comparisons were first purposely inserted during the seventh season episode "The Sixth Extinction II: Amor Fati", in which Mulder is placed on a cross-like table, symbolic of the wooden cross that Jesus was nailed to. Michelle Bush, in her book Myth-X notes that Mulder's torture scenes in "Within" bear a resemblance to the Crucifixion of Jesus. She argues that the metal bars piercing his wrists and ankles are similar to the nails that held Jesus, the metal straps imbedded in his head are similar to the Crown of Thorns, and that his vivisection is reminiscent of the wound made by the Holy Lance. Furthermore, Bush parallels Jesus' "horrific death in order to rise again" to Mulder's abduction, death, and resurrection later on in "Deadalive", which would further make allusions to the Christ-like nature of Mulder.

== Reception ==
=== Ratings ===
"Within" first aired on Fox on November 5, 2000. The episode earned a Nielsen household rating of 9.5, meaning that it was seen by 9.5% of the nation's estimated households. The episode was viewed by 15.87 million viewers. The episode marked an 11% decrease from the seventh season opener, "The Sixth Extinction", but a slight increase over the seventh season finale "Requiem", which was viewed by 15.26 million viewers. As soon as both "Within" and Without" were completed, Carter screened them at the Academy of Television Arts and Sciences. The two were played back-to-back "like a feature film", according to Patrick. The episode was later included on The X-Files Mythology, Volume 3 – Colonization, a DVD collection that contains episodes involved with the alien Colonist's plans to take over the earth.

=== Reviews ===
Overall, the episode received positive reviews from critics. Entertainment Weekly reviewer Ken Tucker gave the episode a largely positive review and awarded it an A−. He said that Patrick's portrayal of Doggett was "hardboiled alertness," giving mostly positive reviews about his inclusion. Furthermore, he noted that Anderson enacted all "her queasiness" in this episode and its follow-up, "Without". Tom Janulewicz from Space.com also reacted positively toward the episode, enjoying the idea of making the character of Skinner into a "true" believer. Paula Vitaris from Cinefantastique gave the episode a more mixed review and awarded it two stars out of four. Vitaris criticized both the unnatural elongation of Scully's pregnancy and the glimpses of Mulder that are shown, calling both "little more than lip-service."

Robert Shearman, in his book Wanting to Believe: A Critical Guide to The X-Files, Millennium & The Lone Gunmen, rated the episode four stars out of five and wrote that it "sings when it reinvents the old and introduces the new." However, Shearman criticized the decision to bring back of Gibson Praise, noting that "the return of Gibson Praise almost derails the episode altogether […] he only manages to make an episode that seemed as if it was giving The X-Files a bold new beginning feel like it's about to offer more of the same old stooge." Tom Kessenich, in his book Examinations wrote a moderately positive review of the episode. He noted, "In many ways, 'Within' reminded us why we tune into The X-Files every week. However, it also reminded us why the road ahead will be difficult. Fox Mulder may be gone, but he will never be forgotten. Or replaced."

Writing on The Companion, A.J. Black praised the manner in which Doggett was introduced in the episode, saying: "Doggett is faced with a difficult challenge from the get-go, both within and without the context of the show (one could argue the case that Carter named the first two episodes of Season 8 ‘Within’ and ‘Without’ as a meta-reference for this very reason). He not only is required to establish himself as an agent working with the brittle and defensive Scully [...] but he is also in need of gaining the trust and support of the X-Files fanbase, many of whom could only ever imagine The X-Files as Mulder/Scully, Duchovny/Anderson."

Zack Handlen of The A.V. Club wrote that both "Within" and "Without" form "a great way to pick up after the cliffhanger ending of the previous season" and that "the pair of episodes [...] work well as an introduction to the new narrative status quo." He awarded both entries a "B+" and praised the characterization of Doggett, writing that "Robert Patrick brings a distinct, charismatic energy to the part." However, he was slightly critical of some of the episode's features, such as the "trope" of Scully being sad or "melodramatic gloom and overheated monologues".

Some fans, however, criticized the introduction of Doggett; claiming that the character had been intentionally created to replace Mulder. Carter responded to this in an interview with National Public Radio (NPR) by stating, "What he brings is a different approach to The X-Files. First of all, he’s a knee jerk skeptic so he couldn’t be more different than the character of Mulder. He’s an insider at the FBI, well liked, has buddies. Mulder, of course, he’s been banished to the basement along with all of his X-files. So when he’s put together with Agent Scully, who has become something of a reluctant believer, the dynamic on the show changes completely".

== Bibliography ==
- Bush, Michelle (2008). Myth-X. Lulu. ISBN 9781435746886.
- Campbell, Bruce (2005). Make Love! The Bruce Campbell Way. St. Martin's Press. ISBN 9780312312602.
- Donaldson, Amy (2011). We Want to Believe. Cascade Books. ISBN 9781606083611.
- Fraga, Erica (2010). LAX-Files: Behind the Scenes with the Los Angeles Cast and Crew. CreateSpace. ISBN 9781451503418.
- Hurwitz, Matt; Knowles, Chris (2008). The Complete X-Files. Insight Editions. ISBN 9781933784809.
- Kellner, Douglas (2003). Media Spectacle. Routledge. ISBN 9780415268288.
- Kessenich, Tom (2002). Examination: An Unauthorized Look at Seasons 6–9 of the X-Files. Trafford Publishing. ISBN 9781553698128.
- Shapiro, Marc (2000). All Things: The Official Guide to the X-Files Volume 6. Harper Prism. ISBN 9780061076114.
- Shearman, Robert (2009). Wanting to Believe: A Critical Guide to The X-Files, Millennium & The Lone Gunmen. Mad Norwegian Press. ISBN 9780975944691.
