= A Community Speaks =

- Directed by: Bruce Campbell; Ida Gearon
- Produced by: Bruce Campbell
- Starring: Bruce Campbell; Ida Gearon
- Edited by: Bruce Campbell
- Release date: 2004
- Running time: 90 minutes
- Country: United States of America
- Language: English

A Community Speaks is a 2004 feature-length documentary about modern-day land stewardship. The documentary was produced and directed by Bruce Campbell and his wife, Ida Gearon.

== Overview ==
The documentary was shot in Oregon. It was also Campbell's second directorial effort, following the 2002 short documentary Fanalysis.

== Starring ==
- Bruce Campbell as himself
- Ida Gearon as herself

== See also ==
- Fanalysis (2002)
