= Ernie & Emma =

2026 American comedy-drama film

- Directed by: Bruce Campbell
- Written by: Bruce Campbell
- Produced by: Bruce Campbell; Ida Gearon
- Starring: Bruce Campbell; Cerina Vincent; Robin McAlpine; Ted Raimi
- Cinematography: Kurt Rauf
- Release dates: February 14, 2026 (Medford, Oregon)
- Country: United States
- Language: English

Ernie & Emma is a 2026 American comedy-drama film written, directed, and starring Bruce Campbell. The film marks a departure from Campbell's traditional work in the horror genre, focusing instead on themes of grief, love, and personal growth. It premiered on February 14, 2026, in Medford, Oregon.

== Premise ==
The film follows Ernie Tyler, a widowed pear salesman who sets out on a journey to scatter his late wife Emma's ashes in locations she specified before her death. Along the way, Ernie reflects on their life together and confronts his grief, ultimately finding a renewed sense of purpose.

== Cast ==
- Bruce Campbell as Ernie Tyler
- Cerina Vincent as Judy
- Robin McAlpine as Emma Tyler
- Ted Raimi as Dance Instructor

== Production ==
The film was written, directed, and produced by Bruce Campbell, alongside producer Ida Gearon. It was filmed in Southern Oregon, particularly in the Rogue Valley region, and features local landmarks such as the Rogue River and Table Rock.

In August 2025, Campbell had an interview with The Horror Zine, where he talked about a new project that he directed, and produced with his wife Ida, Ernie & Emma, a comedy film about a salesman who goes on a roadtrip across the country with his late wife's ashes; he stars as the titular Ernie in the film.

Campbell developed the project as a more personal, character-driven story, intentionally moving away from the horror genre that defined much of his earlier career.

== Release ==
On February 4, 2026, Campbell released a trailer for the film on YouTube.

It premiered at the Holly Theatre in Medford, Oregon on February 14. Following its premiere, the film received a limited theatrical release, with a wider release planned for later in 2026.

In March 2026, Campbell revealed that he had been diagnosed with a form of cancer that he described as "treatable but not curable". Despite the diagnosis, he continued working on the promotional campaign for Ernie & Emma, stating that he intended to prioritize completing the film's press obligations and tour schedule where possible. Campbell indicated that while he would reduce public appearances to focus on treatment, he remained committed to supporting the film's release and promotion.

== Themes ==
The film explores themes of:

- Grief and healing
- Marriage and memory
- Personal reinvention later in life
