= Ripley's Believe It or Not! (2019 TV series) =

- Based on: Ripley's Believe It or Not!
- Country of origin: United States
- Original language: English
- No. of seasons: 1
- No. of episodes: 10

Production
- Production companies: Ripley Entertainment; United Media; Texas Crew Productions

Original release
- Network: Travel Channel
- Release: June 9 – August 4, 2019

Related
- Ripley's Believe It or Not! (Philippine TV program)

Ripley's Believe It or Not! is a television series hosted and executive produced by Bruce Campbell and based on the franchise of the same name. It was produced by Texas Crew Productions and aired for one season on the Travel Channel from June 9 to August 4, 2019.

== Episodes ==
No.	Title	Original air date
1	"Natural Born Thrillers"	June 9, 2019
2	"Invisible Worlds"	June 16, 2019
3	"Showstoppers"	June 23, 2019
4	"Forces of Nature"	June 30, 2019
5	"Beyond Driven"	July 7, 2019
6	"Building the Impossible"	July 14, 2019
7	"The Curious Case of..."	July 21, 2019
8	"Great Obsessions"	July 28, 2019
9	"Surviving the Odds"	August 4, 2019
10	"The Defiant Ones"	August 4, 2019
