= Broken Helix =

1997 video game

- NTSC cover art
- Developer: Konami Computer Entertainment Chicago
- Publisher: Konami
- Director: Jeff Troutman
- Programmer: Scott Krotz
- Composer: Adgio Hutchings
- Platform: PlayStation
- Release: NA: May 30, 1997; EU: February 1998; JP: March 26, 1998
- Genre: Third-person shooter
- Mode: Single-player

Broken Helix is a third-person shooter video game developed and published by Konami for the PlayStation. It was marketed as featuring "4-D" gameplay, referencing the fact that the game's events all unfold in real time (time is sometimes referred to as the fourth dimension). This allows the player to activate and deactivate certain objects in later levels of the game. It also has four plot lines, allowing the player to finish the game in four different ways.

== Plot ==
The game takes place in the year 2026 in a fictitious version of Area 51. The main character is explosives expert Jake Burton of the Marine division, voiced by Bruce Campbell. His father worked at this top-secret military base when Jake was nine years old. He had "died in a plane crash on his way to work 15 years ago, along with 10 other scientists." After Jake's father's death, the government denied any existence of Area 51. Jake got orders via telephone from a man who would not give his name, but said he knew Jake's father very well. Jake was deployed and the game begins.

Jake's mission from the Sarge is to defuse explosives set on levels one and two of the base. A scientist named Fitz demands "two million dollars in unmarked bills, a private jet, and a televised interview" and the timer starts counting down at 20 minutes. A platoon of six Marines, led by the sinister Marine commander Black Dawn, whose orders are to "clean things up after you complete your mission." His main team consists of Tonka, Sweetie and a group of three lesser Marines Frick, Frank and an unnamed Marine.

The first bomb, located in the men's bathroom on Level 1 for reasons untold, is defused. The automated guns on Level 2 are deactivated in the Satlink. Jake heads down to Level 2 and defuses the second bomb. Jake is then given orders to hold his position and Black Dawn is given orders to kill him. A mysterious man who wants to help Jake tells him of Black Dawn's orders. A strange field surrounds the base, preventing radio contact from outside the base. From here, the player has four choices on how to complete the game.

=== Plot 1 ===
Jake meets a reporter named Sara Compton who gives him a satellite link (satlink) amplifier. He is also given a key for an express elevator up to the Satlink. The amplifier is installed and the strange man tells him of Project Broken Helix and gives him the password to access the file. Jake acquires the file about Broken Helix from the Level 3 Lab and gives it to Fitz in the Command Centre on Level 4. Black Dawn and his team enter the command centre and Fitz is killed. Jake meets up with a scientist named Reese on Level 6 and finds out why his father was murdered. Reese leads him down to Level 7, where he shows Jake what Broken Helix actually is. "Their DNA is unraveling at an alarming rate, causing strange mutations to occur. Freezing them was the only way to stop them until we find a cure."

Jack finds out that Project Broken Helix was an experiment for biological warfare. It takes extracted DNA from alien life forms and turns humans into hybrid aliens, but an unintentional side-effect made them see humans as enemies, and therefore, kill them. For this reason, the military wanted to shut the project down because it had gone too far. Reese did not want the alien life forms to die, so he locked up the elevators to Level 6 so he could find a cure that would reverse the effects of Broken Helix. He put the aliens in a cryogenic sleep, as Broken Helix caused the aliens to have their DNA unravel and they themselves turn into mutant hybrids. Jake's father had found this cure, and was killed for this reason.

Jake is told to get a force field device from Level 10, bring it back to Reese and a living alien, and set up an explosive on a fusion reactor droid on Level 9. The alien gives Jake a part of an alien weapon. The alien tells Jake that when this weapon is combined with an organic component, can penetrate the custom made armor that makes Black Dawn and his crew invincible. However, someone lets Black Dawn into Level 6 and Jake has to activate a teleporter so that the alien life forms can flee. Jake kills three of the remaining Marines, as two were killed on their way down to Level 6. Jake sets the explosives and he and Reese get down to Level 10 to activate the droid. They head across the level to activate a force field device to contain the explosion. On their way, they meet up with Black Dawn and a traitor named Jenkins. Jake blows up Black Dawn with the other detonator and they activate the force field device in an alien ship. Jenkins meets up with the two in the ship and Jake finds out that he was the one who killed his father. Reese is knocked out by Jenkins and the alien queen eats Jenkins alive. The alien queen is then killed by Jake. Jake and Reese head out of range of the force field so they do not get blown up with the aliens.

Jake and Reese exit the base only to be confronted by a sergeant. The strange man gives him new orders to let them go and Jake is evacuated. Jake and his wife retire. As for Reese, he disappeared two days after the Area 51 incident and Jake never saw him again.

=== Plot 2 ===
If Jake branches off from Plot 1, Jake acquires a purple keycard from a stunned scientist on Level 3. He uses this to open one of the observation chambers, talks to one of the hybrids and is given another key that looks something like a blue flame. Jake uses this to turn on the gas valves so that the hybrids can't die by the Goliath virus, and a hybrid gives him a blue diamond as a reward. However, humans can still die by virus with the gas valves activated, as the valves were designed for the hybrids to allow them to breathe inside the observation chambers.

When on Level 8, Jake goes into a side passage and uses this diamond to get into a room. The alien queen telepathically talks to Jake and tells him she needs his help, and that Reese banished her into the underworld of Area 51. He uses the gem on a pillar and turns into a spider-like hybrid. A door blows open and a bunch of Marines are freed. Jake is told by the alien queen to get an alien warrior to follow him to the queen's ship (she wants to go to her home world, and the warrior has the co-ordinates). On the way, he runs into Black Dawn and Psyches, who is a Marine commander and Black Dawn's sidekick. Psyches wears blue armour not seen in the other plots. He kills them, moves on and enters the ship with the alien warrior.

The alien queen insists Jake comes with her so he does not get killed. Jake helps pilot the giant ship and readies himself for his new life.

If Jake fails this plot, the alien queen will say she has "no more use" for Jake and blows up Earth from her UFO.

=== Plot 3 ===
Early in Plot 1, Jake can branch off to Plot 3 by talking to Sara after the strange man tells Jake to not bring her to meet Fitz. If he talks to Sara, she tells him how she was supposed to interview Fitz, but her cameraman Robert died on his way down to the command center on Level 5 (Fitz' hideout). Jake has to escort Sara to Level 5 to meet Fitz. Along the way, there is a green gas virus called "Goliath" in Level 3 where Jake and Sara have to find antidote pills using a maintenance robot.

Jake and Sara meet Fitz for the interview. On live TV Fitz shows a VHS tape of one of the spider-like hybrids, who then brutally kills a group of three scientists with the tape cutting out when the hybrid is about to kill the third scientist. As an insider who knew the truth about Area 51, Fitz felt the need to tell the world about Project Broken Helix and explains it in detail on TV, as Reese explained to Jake in Plot 1.

Black Dawn and his team approach Level 5, and Jake, Sara, Fitz and a scientist flee through the command centre's underground warehouse to the mine tunnels on Level 5. Fitz gives Jake a key to the warbot. Jake has to use the warbot to distract Black Dawn and his team so that Fitz, Sara and the scientist have enough time to flee to the mines, where there is an escape tunnel. After that is done, Jake needs to hide long enough to lose Black Dawn, giving Jake the opportunity to reach the mine shafts.

Fitz, Sara and the scientist wait by a drill rig besides the electric barrier blocking the escape tunnels. Fitz orders Jake to disable the mine's barrier with a C4 explosive, where like in Plot 1 Jake has to go all the way down to Level 10 to find the barrier's power source. Upon planting the C4 Jake is ordered to go back up to the mine tunnels on Level 5.

With Fitz, Sara and the scientist in the drill rig Jake jumps on top of the rig and the C4 is detonated automatically to destroy the electric barrier. With the rig driving through the tunnels, Jake has to kills all of the marines on the higher platforms, who expected that Fitz would escape through the mine tunnels. After a very difficult battle Jake and his team make it to the surface where there is an escape helicopter waiting for them.

Fitz in the ending cutscene gives Jake a passport and new ID, so that Jake and his unnamed wife (never discussed in the game) will met in Paris. Jake, Fitz, Sara and a group of scientists board the helicopter together. While on the helicopter Jake thinks to himself how he "just scratched the surface" regarding Area 51 and that "something didn't seem right with Fitz's story". He also wonders what was going on in the lower levels of Area 51 in the alien underground world, which Jake says "perhaps I'll never know".

A military jet shoots at Fitz's helicopter, killing Jake and everyone else on board. The strange man watches from the entrance of Area 51, saying "there was a better way..."

=== Plot 4 ===
If Jake refuses to detonate one of the two bombs and goes straight to Level 3, security cameras spot Jake and Fitz blows up the first two levels of the base. Fitz shouts, "No more deals! Project Broken Helix will now be destroyed!" and when a scientist tells him "No, wait!" Fitz screams and detonates the bomb(s).

Black Dawn, Sweetie and the unnamed Marine die, and Levels 1 and 2 are no longer accessible. Tonka, Frick and Frack manage to survive. Tonka on the communication link communicates with Jake, saying if there are any Marines on Level 3 and that Tonka and his team would wait by the elevator doors. Upon meeting Tonka, Jake receives the following orders that Black Dawn had ordered them:

Kill all scientists on Levels 1-8 including Fitz and destroy the Command Centre on Level 5. After a thorough search on each level, turn on the exterminators. They will take care of any loose ends. Burton (Jake) is armed and dangerous. Kill him on sight. A reporter was last seen on Level 2, make sure any camera footage is destroyed and eliminate her. Delete Broken Helix files in Level 3 lab and kill all Hybrids on Level 3. Agent inside Level 6 will grand access into Medlab. Destroy Medlab, Reese and his men, and all test subjects inside the cryogenic chambers. Agent will give you additional orders.

Tonka tells Jake that "we are unsure who Burton is", and Jake lies to Tonka saying "I've heard of him, he's armed and pretty dangerous." Then Jake has to stay near Tonka the whole time on the way to the Command Centre, where there is a "Kill-O-Meter" challenge where Jake has to kill everything before Tonka does so that you prove yourself as disloyal. Upon reaching the entrance of Level 5, Tonka orders Jake to split from the group to find the yellow keycard.

Even before meeting Tonka, Jake can choose to roam Level 3, 4 and 5 to collect pick-ups and get the yellow keycard early. Jake can also kill everyone on these levels so that the "Kill-O-Meter" challenge is made easier.

Jake and Tonka reach Level 6 and they are blocked by a force field barrier, which Jenkins opens for them. When Jenkins says that Jake looks familiar and asks for his name in front of Tonka, Jake lies and tells him his name is Hudson. Jake then has to escort Jenkins down to Level 7, meanwhile Tonka kills all of the scientists on Level 6. Inside Level 7, the trio encounters Reese. Reese begs the trio not to kill him and the alien life forms in the cryogenic chambers, but Resse is killed anyway. After he is killed, the alien life forms float in the air and the trio must kill off all of the aliens, with Jake having to protect Jenkins from their orb attacks.

Upon killing all of the aliens, Psyches calls Jenkins telling him that he will send all in all of his Marines to "nuke" Area 51. Jenkins disables the forcefield surrounding Area 51. Jake, Tonka and Jenkins walk out of Area 51, and the Sarge is mad at Jake for disobeying his orders to defuse the bombs. Jenkins sticks up for Jake to prevent him from being court marshaled. While boarding a lone helicopter, Jake narrates how feels regret for taking away the aliens' chance at life. Jenkins tells the Sarge that Jake "was a good Marine" while the Sarge complained about Jake being "a loose cannon like his father".

A bomb is secretly planted underneath Jake's helicopter while he is on board, killing Jake. Just like in Plot 2, the strange man watches from the entrance of Area 51, saying "there was a better way..."

== Development ==
Early in development, Broken Helix was a first-person shooter.

== Reception ==
Reception

Review scores
Publication	Score
Electronic Gaming Monthly	7.125/10
GameSpot	6.9/10
IGN	6/10
Next Generation	3/5

Broken Helix received mixed reviews, with critics generally praising the story progression but criticizing the gameplay and graphics. The most common complaint was that the grainy polygons, poor lighting, and rigid over-the-shoulder perspective often make it difficult for players to see what they're doing. Some critics also cited control issues, and a review published in both IGN and Next Generation (with minor changes between the publications) reported that the detection on the cameras is faulty, occasionally resulting in an immediate game over without the player having made any mistakes.

Reviews generally praised the game's humor, particularly Bruce Campbell's deadpan delivery, though Next Generation and Shawn Smith of Electronic Gaming Monthly both said that all the non-Campbell voices are overacted and annoying.

Most critics were impressed by the intriguing storyline and its multiple paths, often arguing they make the game worth consideration in spite of the gameplay issues. For instance, Josh Smith summarized Broken Helix in GameSpot as "a complex web of plotlines in a 3D shooter/adventure whose shortcomings in control and graphical clarity are made up for by the game's narrative twists and tough real-time challenges." Likewise, GamePro concluded that "Broken Helix's so-so action gameplay is in need or repair. Science fiction sleuths, however, may find Helix's plot twists and turns a compelling turn-on."
