= Fanalysis =

- Directed by: Bruce Campbell
- Produced by: Bruce Campbell
- Starring: Bruce Campbell; Ted Raimi; Harry Knowles
- Cinematography: Kurt Rauf
- Edited by: John Walter
- Music by: Dan Kolton
- Distributed by: Campbell Entertainment Inc.
- Release date: 2002
- Running time: 26 minutes
- Country: United States
- Language: English

Fanalysis is a 2002 short documentary film directed by Bruce Campbell and starring Campbell, Ted Raimi, and Harry Knowles.

== Overview ==
Actor Bruce Campbell investigates the world of fans of cult movies and television.

== Starring ==
- Bruce Campbell as himself
- Ted Raimi as himself
- Tim Thomerson as himself
- Ryan Wickerham as himself
- Harry Knowles as himself
