= Make Love! The Bruce Campbell Way =

2005 novel by Bruce Campbell

- Author: Bruce Campbell
- Illustrator: Craig "Kif" Sanborn
- Language: English
- Genre: Comic novel
- Publisher: St. Martin's Press
- Publication date: May 26, 2005
- Publication place: United States
- Media type: Print (Hardback & Paperback) & Audiobook
- Pages: 320 pp
- ISBN: 978-0-312-31260-2
- OCLC: 58975874
- Dewey Decimal: 813/.6 22
- LC Class: PS3603.A465 M35 2005

Make Love! The Bruce Campbell Way is a comedy novel written by actor Bruce Campbell. The novel is written in the first person and involves real life celebrities such as Richard Gere, Renée Zellweger, and Mike Nichols; however, it is fiction. On the jacket of Make Love! The Bruce Campbell Way the author states, quote:

Is it an "autobiographical novel"? Yes. I'm the lead character in the story, and I'm a real person, and everything in the book actually happened except for the stuff that didn't.

It was first published on May 26, 2005, and is a satire of celebrity memoirs.

== Plot summary ==
Make Love! The Bruce Campbell Way begins with an excerpt from an email that Bruce Campbell received from Barry Neville from St. Martin's Press in regard to a book, Walk this Way, that he was attempting to write. The email expresses the publisher's disinterest in that book, but a desire for Campbell to work on a different project. Upon calling Barry Neville, Bruce is presented with the idea of writing a relationship book. Bruce feels he cannot approach the concept, since he does not see himself as an authority on the subject and feels his editor has a false impression of his mastery of relationships.

He is contacted by his acting agent Barry about a potential role in a Richard Gere/Renée Zellweger romantic comedy titled Let's Make Love, written by Kevin Jarre, directed by Mike Nichols, and produced by Robert Evans. Bruce jumps to the conclusion that the role is a small, insignificant part, but he finds out that his role is in fact a large part as the wise-cracking doorman. Bruce goes to New York City and auditions for the role, then gets the role despite the fact he was not the first, second or last choice; others considered included Johnny Depp, John Cusack, Billy Campbell, Gary Sinise, John Malkovich, and Robert Patrick. From this point, Bruce tries to do research for his role. He first tries being a doorman at the Waldorf-Astoria Hotel, where he has an encounter with Colin Powell that does not end well.

Make Love! The Bruce Campbell Way continues to follow Bruce Campbell through his trials and tribulations with the movie. He goes to a gentleman's club, supposedly to learn how to be a true Southern gentleman, but instead finds it to be no more than a strip club and gets shot for portraying himself as someone else while there. Bruce also makes a trip out to see a friend about relationships, but finds his friend to be nothing more than a sleaze who takes advantage of his clients.

By the end of the book, Bruce is fighting to keep his role and seeing Let's Make Love sliding from an A-list movie to a B-list movie supposedly due to the B movie actor curse caused by Bruce Campbell.

== Images ==
Make Love! The Bruce Campbell Way uses many original images created by graphic artist Craig "Kif" Sanborn in order to both illustrate Campbell's narrative and to provide supplemental humor, including an image of a surveillance van with "Ordinary Parked Van, Pay No Attention Just Keep Doing What You Are Doing, Speak Clearly & Audibly" printed in large letters on its side.

== Audiobook ==
The audiobook was produced as a comedy album, rather than a traditional audiobook, with a cast of actors performing the dialogue, and Campbell arranged a deal with a record label, Rykodisc, to distribute the album, rather than a book publisher. The album was released on six compact discs on June 14, 2005.

== Critical reception ==
Kirkus Reviews, "Scratch the willing suspension of disbelief. But never mind: this is good fun, and lots of it. And besides, anyone who allows that Carrot Top's agent is Satan is all right."
