= Bruce Campbell =

American actor and filmmaker (born 1958)

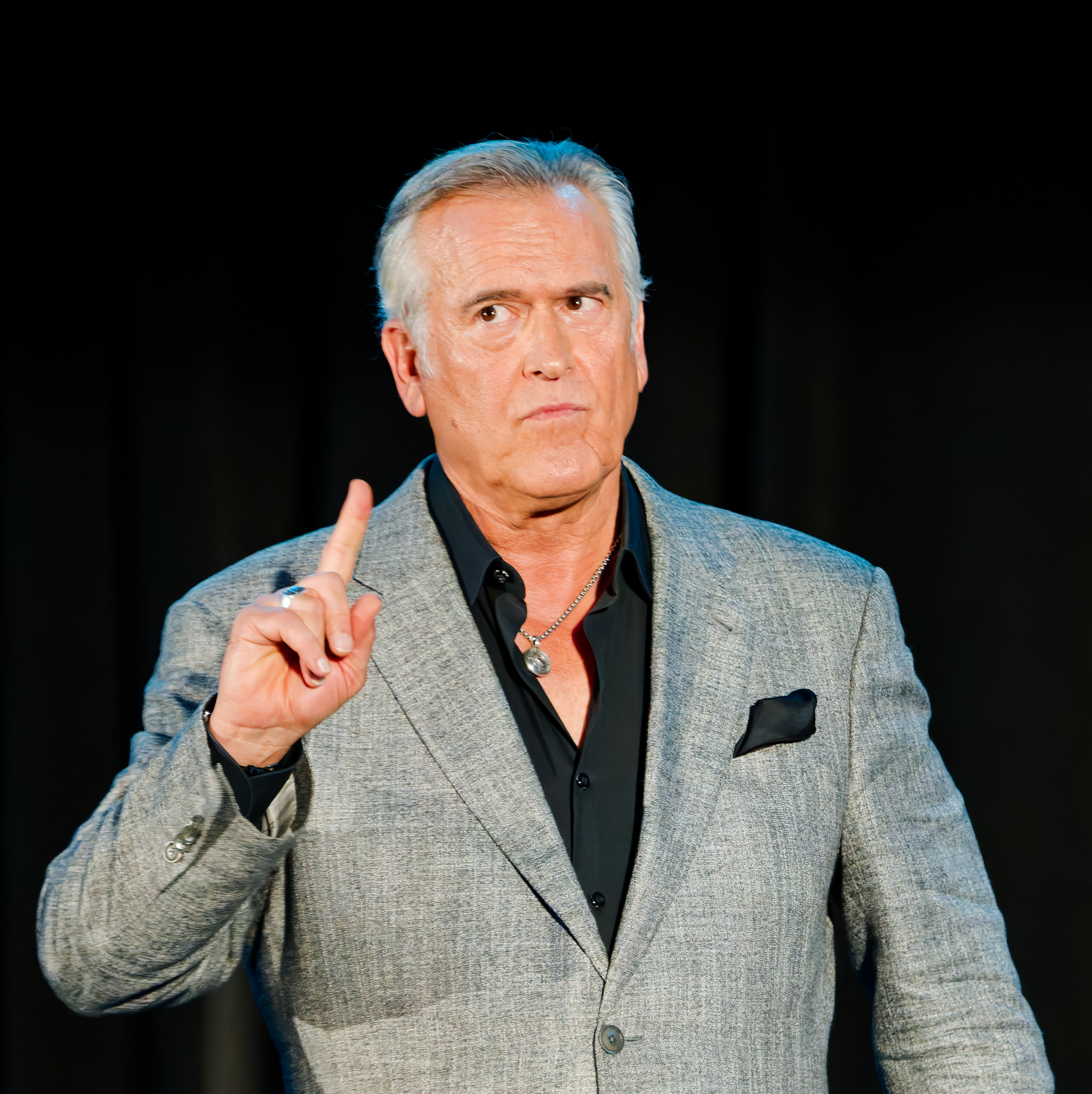
- Campbell in 2025
- Born: Bruce Lorne Campbell; June 22, 1958 (age 68); Royal Oak, Michigan, U.S.
- Education: Western Michigan University
- Occupations: Actor; filmmaker
- Years active: 1977–present
- Spouses: Christine Deveau (m. 1983; div. 1989); Ida Gearon (m. 1991)
- Children: 2
- Website: bruce-campbell.com

Bruce Lorne Campbell (born June 22, 1958) is an American actor and filmmaker. He is best known for portraying Ash Williams in Sam Raimi's Evil Dead horror series. He has also featured in many low-budget cult movies, such as Crimewave (1985), Maniac Cop (1988), Sundown: The Vampire in Retreat (1989), and Bubba Ho-Tep (2002). His roles in horror earned him the fame to be known as a scream king, being referred to as "the definitive one".

Campbell had the main roles of the television series The Adventures of Brisco County, Jr. (1993–1994) and Jack of All Trades (2000), and a recurring role as Autolycus, King of Thieves in Hercules: The Legendary Journeys (1995–1999) and Xena: Warrior Princess (1995–2001). He played Sam Axe on the USA Network series Burn Notice (2007–2013) and reprised his role as Ash for the Starz series Ash vs. Evil Dead (2015–2018).

Campbell directed, produced, and featured in the documentaries Fanalysis (2002) and A Community Speaks (2004); co-wrote, directed, produced, and featured in the movie Man with the Screaming Brain (2005); and directed, produced, and featured in a parody of his career My Name Is Bruce (2007).

Campbell is known for frequent collaborations with Sam Raimi, Ted Raimi, Josh Becker, and Scott Spiegel.

== Early life ==
Bruce Lorne Campbell was born in Royal Oak, Michigan, on June 22, 1958, the son of advertising executive and college professor Charles Newton Campbell and homemaker Joanne Louise (née Pickens). He is of English and Scottish ancestry, and has an older brother named Don and an older half-brother named Michael. His father was also an actor and director for local theater. Campbell began acting and making short Super 8 movies with friends as a teenager. After meeting future moviemaker Sam Raimi while the two attended Wylie E. Groves High School, they became good friends and collaborators. Campbell attended Western Michigan University and continued to pursue an acting career.

== Career ==
=== Film ===
Campbell as Ash Williams in Evil Dead II (1987)

Campbell and Raimi collaborated on a 30-minute Super 8 version of the first Evil Dead movie, titled Within the Woods (1979), which was initially used to attract investors. He and Raimi got together with family and friends to begin working on The Evil Dead (1981). While featuring as the protagonist, Campbell also had participation with the production of the movie, receiving a co-executive producer credit. Raimi wrote, directed, and edited the movie, while Rob Tapert produced. After an endorsement by horror author Stephen King, the movie slowly began to receive attention and offers for distribution. Four years after its original release, it became the most popular movie in the UK. It was then distributed in the United States, resulting in the sequels Evil Dead II (1987) and Army of Darkness (1992).

Campbell was also drawn in the Marvel Zombie comics as his character, Ash Williams. He is featured in five comics, all in the series Marvel Zombies vs. Army of Darkness. In them, he fights alongside the Marvel heroes against the heroes and people who have become zombies (deadites) while in search of the Necronomicon (Book of the Names of the Dead).

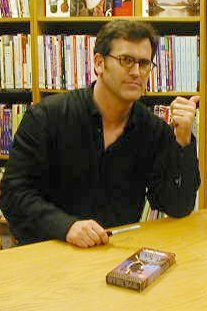
Campbell in 2009, signing a VHS copy of The Evil Dead

He has appeared in several of Raimi's movies other than the Evil Dead series, notably having cameo appearances in the director's Spider-Man film series. Campbell also joined the cast of Raimi's movie Darkman and The Quick and the Dead, though having no actual screen time in the latter movie's theatrical version. In March 2022, Campbell was announced to have a cameo in Raimi's Marvel Cinematic Universe film Doctor Strange in the Multiverse of Madness.

Campbell often performs quirky roles, such as Elvis Presley for the movie Bubba Ho-Tep. Along with Bubba Ho-Tep, he played a supporting role in Maniac Cop and Maniac Cop 2, and spoofed his career in the self-directed My Name is Bruce.

Other mainstream movies for Campbell include supporting or featured roles in the Coen Brothers movie The Hudsucker Proxy, the Michael Crichton adaptation Congo, the movie version of McHale's Navy, Escape from L.A. (the sequel to John Carpenter's Escape from New York), the Jim Carrey drama The Majestic and the 2005 Disney movie Sky High.

Campbell had a major voice role for the 2009 animated adaptation of the children's book Cloudy with a Chance of Meatballs, and a supporting voice role for Pixar's Cars 2.

Campbell produced the 2013 remake of The Evil Dead, along with Raimi and Rob Tapert, appearing in the movie's post-credits scene in a cameo role with the expectation he would reprise that role in Army of Darkness 2. The next year, the comedy metal band Psychostick released a song titled "Bruce Campbell" on their album IV: Revenge of the Vengeance that pays a comedic tribute to his past roles.

Campbell worked as an executive producer for the Evil Dead spin-off films Evil Dead Rise (2023), Evil Dead Burn (2026), and Evil Dead Wrath (2028).

In August 2025, Campbell had an interview with The Horror Zine, where he talked about a new project that he directed, and produced with his wife Ida, Ernie & Emma, a comedy film about a salesman who goes on a roadtrip across the country with his late wife's ashes; he stars as the titular Ernie in the film. On February 4, 2026, he released a trailer for it via YouTube. It premiered at the Holly Theatre in Medford, Oregon on February 14.

=== Television ===
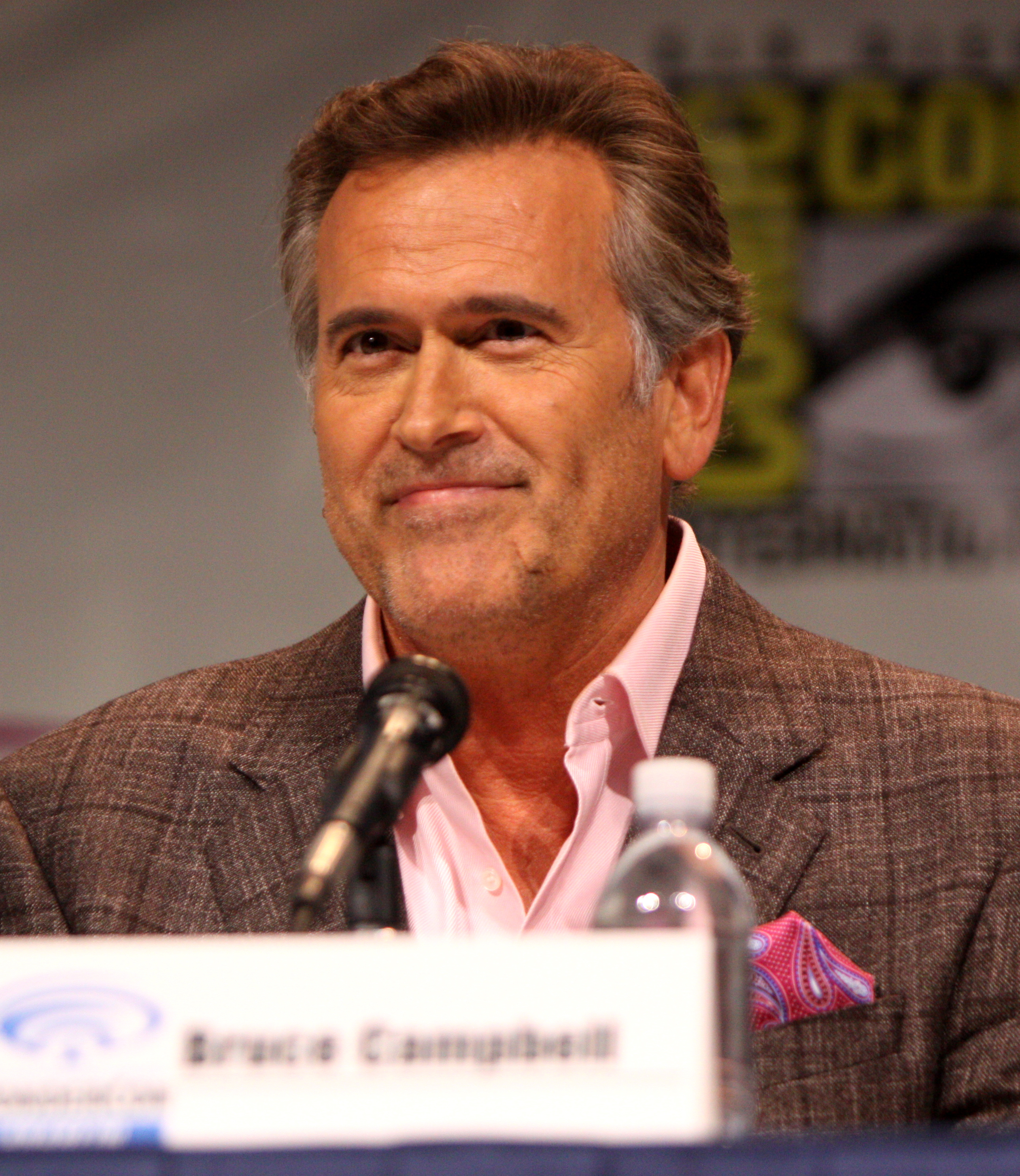
Campbell at WonderCon in 2013

Campbell has appeared in a number of television series in both lead and recurring roles. He featured in The Adventures of Brisco County, Jr. a boisterous science fiction comedy western created by Jeffrey Boam and Carlton Cuse that played for one season. He played a lawyer turned bounty hunter who was trying to hunt down John Bly, the man who killed his father. He featured in the television series Jack of All Trades, set on a fictional island occupied by the French in 1801. Campbell was also credited as co-executive producer, among others. The show was directed by Eric Gruendemann, and was produced by various people, including Sam Raimi. The show was broadcast for two seasons, from 2000 to 2001. He had a recurring role as "Bill Church Jr." based upon the character of Morgan Edge from the Superman comics on Lois & Clark: The New Adventures of Superman.

From 1996 to 1997, Campbell was a recurring guest actor of the television series Ellen as Ed Billik, who becomes Ellen's boss when she sells her bookstore in season four.

He is also known for his supporting role as the recurring character Autolycus ("King of Thieves") on both Hercules: The Legendary Journeys and Xena: Warrior Princess, which reunited him with producer Rob Tapert. Campbell played Hercules/Xena series producer Tapert in two episodes of Hercules set in the present. He directed a number of episodes of Hercules and Xena, including the Hercules series finale.

Campbell also obtained the main role of race car driver Hank Cooper for the Disney made-for-television remake of The Love Bug.

Campbell had a critically acclaimed dramatic guest role as a grief-stricken detective seeking revenge for his father's murder in a two-part episode of the fourth season of Homicide: Life on the Street. Campbell later played the part of a bigamous demon in The X-Files episode "Terms of Endearment". He also featured as Agent Jackman in the episode "Witch Way Now?" of the WB series Charmed, as well as playing a state police officer in an episode of the short-lived series American Gothic titled "Meet The Beetles".

Campbell co-featured in the television series Burn Notice, which was broadcast from 2007 to 2013 by USA Network. He portrayed Sam Axe, a beer-chugging, former Navy SEAL now working as an unlicensed private investigator and occasional mercenary with his old friend Michael Westen, the show's main character. When working undercover, his character frequently used the alias Chuck Finley, which Bruce later revealed was the name of one of his father's old co-workers. Campbell was the star of a 2011 Burn Notice made-for-television prequel focusing on Sam's Navy SEAL career, titled Burn Notice: The Fall of Sam Axe.

In 2014, Campbell played Santa Claus for an episode of The Librarians. Campbell played Ronald Reagan in season 2 of the FX original series Fargo. More recently Campbell reprised his role as Ashley "Ash" Williams in Ash vs Evil Dead, a series based upon the Evil Dead series that began his career. Ash vs Evil Dead began airing on Starz on October 31, 2015, and was renewed by the cable channel for second and third seasons, before being cancelled.

In January 2019, Travel Channel announced a new version of the Ripley's Believe It or Not! reality series, with Campbell serving as host and executive producer. The 10-episode season debuted on June 9, 2019.

=== Voice acting ===
Campbell is featured as a voice actor for several video games. He provides the voice of Ash in the four games based on the Evil Dead movies series: Evil Dead: Hail to the King, Evil Dead: A Fistful of Boomstick, Evil Dead: Regeneration and Evil Dead: The Game. He also provided the voice of Ash in Dead by Daylight, Call of Duty: Modern Warfare II, and Call of Duty: Warzone 2.0.

Campbell also provided voice talent in other titles such as Pitfall 3D: Beyond the Jungle, Spider-Man, Spider-Man 2, Spider-Man 3, and The Amazing Spider-Man.

He provided the voice of main character Jake Logan for the 2000 PC game, Tachyon: The Fringe, the voice of main character Jake Burton for the 1997 PlayStation game Broken Helix, and the voice of Magnanimous in the animated TV series Megas XLR. He also provided the voice of Mayor Shelbourne for the 2009 movie Cloudy With a Chance of Meatballs, the voice of Rod "Torque" Redline in Cars 2, the voice of Himcules in the 2003 Nickelodeon TV series My Life as a Teenage Robot, and the voice of Fugax in the 2006 movie The Ant Bully.

He has a voice in the online MOBA game, Tome: Immortal Arena in 2014. Campbell also provided voice-over and motion capture for Sgt. Lennox in the Exo Zombies mode of Call of Duty: Advanced Warfare.

=== Writing ===
In addition to acting and occasionally directing, Campbell has become a writer, starting with an autobiography, If Chins Could Kill: Confessions of a B Movie Actor, published in June 2001. The autobiography was a successful New York Times Best Seller. It describes Campbell's career to date as an actor in low-budget movies and television, providing his insight into "Blue-Collar Hollywood". The paperback version of the book adds details about the reactions of fans during book signings: "Whenever I do mainstream stuff, I think they're pseudo-interested, but they're still interested in seeing weirdo, offbeat stuff, and that's what I'm attracted to".

Campbell's next book Make Love! The Bruce Campbell Way was published on May 26, 2005. The book's plot involves him (depicted in a comical way) as the main character struggling to make it into the world of A-list movies. He later recorded an audio play adaptation of Make Love with fellow Michigan actors, including longtime collaborator Ted Raimi. This radio drama was released by the independent label Rykodisc and spans six discs with a six-hour running time.

In addition to his books, Campbell also wrote a column for X-Ray Magazine in 2001, an issue of the popular comic series The Hire, and comic book adaptations of his Man with the Screaming Brain. Most recently he wrote the introduction to Josh Becker's The Complete Guide to Low-Budget Feature Filmmaking.

In late 2016, Campbell announced that he would be releasing a third book, Hail to the Chin: Further Confessions of a B Movie Actor, which will detail his life from where If Chins Could Kill ended. Hail to the Chin was released in August 2017, and accompanied by a book tour across the United States and Europe.

Campbell maintained a weblog on his official website, where he posted mainly about politics and the movie industry. However, the website is now defunct.

=== Bruce Campbell Horror Film Festival ===
Since 2014, the Bruce Campbell Horror Film Festival, narrated and organized by Campbell, was held in the Muvico Theater in Rosemont, Illinois. The first festival was originally from August 21 to 25, 2014, presented by Wizard World, as part of the Chicago Comicon. The second festival was from August 20 to 23, 2015, with guests Tom Holland and Eli Roth. The third festival took place over four days in August 2016. Guests of the event were Sam Raimi, Robert Tapert and Doug Benson.

== Personal life ==
Campbell married Christine Deveau in 1983; they had two children before divorcing in 1989. He met costume designer Ida Gearon while working on Mindwarp. They married in 1991. They reside in Jacksonville, Oregon.

Campbell is an ordained minister, and has performed marriage ceremonies. Campbell was raised in a Christian Science household, but since becoming an adult, he has sought a more individual "journey" of belief, preferring to describe himself as a "citizen of the world" rather than identifying with any religious denomination. Campbell is a Kentucky Colonel.

On March 2, 2026, Campbell announced on social media that he was diagnosed with "a type of cancer that's 'treatable' not 'curable'". On September 3, during an appearance on The Adam Carolla Show, he estimated that he had five years left to live.

== Filmography ==
Key
†	Denotes works that have not yet been released

=== Film ===
Year	Film	Role	Director	Notes
1977	It's Murder!	Cop on Bicycle	Sam Raimi	
1978	Shemp Eats the Moon	Shemp Malone	John Cameron	Short film; also producer
1979	Attack of the Helping Hand	The Hamburger Helper Helping Hand / The Pillsbury Doughboy	Scott Spiegel	Uncredited roles; Short film; also cinematographer
1979	Within the Woods	Bruce	Sam Raimi	Short film; also executive producer
1980	The Blind Waiter	The Blind Waiter	Josh Becker and Scott Spiegel	Uncredited role; Short film
1981	The Evil Dead	Ash Williams	Sam Raimi	Also executive producer
1982	Cleveland Smith: Bounty Hunter	Cleveland Smith	Josh Becker	Short film
1982	Blood Simple investor trailer	Julian Marty	Joel and Ethan Coen	Short film
1983	Going Back	Brice Chapman	Ron Teachworth	
1985	Crimewave	Renaldo 'The Heel'	Sam Raimi	Also co-producer
1985	Thou Shalt Not Kill... Except	Video newscaster	Josh Becker	Uncredited cameo; Also story writer
1987	Evil Dead II	Ash Williams	Sam Raimi	Also co-producer
1988	Maniac Cop	Jack Forrest	William Lustig	
1989	Intruder	Officer Howard	Scott Spiegel	
1989	Moontrap	Ray Tanner	Robert Dyke	
1989	Easy Wheels	—N/a	David O'Malley	Producer
1989	The Dead Next Door	Raimi & Commander Carpenter	J.R. Bookwalter	Voices
1990	Sundown: The Vampire in Retreat	Robert Van Helsing	Anthony Hickox	
1990	Maniac Cop 2	Jack Forrest	William Lustig	
1990	Darkman	Final Shemp	Sam Raimi	Cameo
1991	Lunatics: A Love Story	Ray	Josh Becker	Also producer
1992	Eddie Presley	Asylum Attendant	Jeff Burr	Cameo
1992	Waxwork II: Lost in Time	John Loftmore	Anthony Hickox	
1992	Mindwarp	Stover	Steve Barnett	
1992	The Nutt House	—N/a	Adam Rifkin	Writer
1992	Army of Darkness	Ash Williams	Sam Raimi	Also co-producer
1994	The Hudsucker Proxy	Smitty	Joel and Ethan Coen	
1995	Congo	Charles Travis	Frank Marshall	
1995	The Quick and the Dead	Wedding Shemp	Sam Raimi	Deleted scene
1995	The Demolitionist	Raffle Winner	Robert Kurtzman	Uncredited cameo
1996	Fargo	Soap opera actor on TV	Joel and Ethan Coen	Uncredited cameo
1996	Escape from L.A.	Surgeon General of Beverly Hills	John Carpenter	
1997	In the Line of Duty: Blaze of Glory	Jeff Erickson	Dick Lowry	
1997	Menno's Mind	Mick Dourif	Jon Kroll	
1997	Running Time	Carl	Josh Becker	
1997	McHale's Navy	Virgil	Bryan Spicer	
1998	The Ice Rink	Actor	Jean-Philippe Toussaint	
1999	From Dusk Till Dawn 2: Texas Blood Money	Barry	Scott Spiegel	Direct-to-DVD
2000	Icebreaker	Carl Greig	David Giancola	
2000	Timequest	William Roberts	Robert Dyke	
2001	Hubert's Brain	Thompson	Phil Robinson	Voice; Short film
2001	The Majestic	Roland the Intrepid Explorer	Frank Darabont	Cameo
2002	Spider-Man	Ring Announcer	Sam Raimi	Cameo
2002	Hatred of a Minute	—N/a	Michael Kallio	Producer
2002	Bubba Ho-Tep	Elvis Presley	Don Coscarelli	
2002	Serving Sara	Gordon Moore	Reginald Hudlin	
2002	Fanalysis	Himself	Himself	Documentary; also producer
2003	Drugs	Bruce	Chad Peter	Direct-to-DVD
2003	Intolerable Cruelty	Soap opera actor on TV	Joel and Ethan Coen	Uncredited cameo
2004	The Ladykillers	Humane Society Worker	Joel and Ethan Coen	Uncredited cameo
2004	Comic Book: The Movie	Himself	Mark Hamill	Direct-to-DVD
2004	A Community Speaks	Himself	Himself & Ida Gearon	Documentary; also producer and editor
2004	Spider-Man 2	Snooty Usher	Sam Raimi	Cameo
2005	Man with the Screaming Brain	William Cole	Himself	Also writer and producer
2005	Sky High	Tommy Boomowski / Coach Boomer / Sonic Boom	Mike Mitchell	
2006	The Woods	Joe Fasulo	Lucky McKee	
2006	The Ant Bully	Fugax	John A. Davis	Voice
2007	Aqua Teen Hunger Force Colon Movie Film for Theaters	Chicken Bittle	Matt Maiellaro and Dave Willis	Voice
2007	Spider-Man 3	Maître d'	Sam Raimi	Cameo
2007	My Name Is Bruce	Faux Bruce Campbell	Himself	Also producer
2009	Cloudy with a Chance of Meatballs	Mayor Shelbourne	Phil Lord and Christopher Miller	Voice
2009	White on Rice	Muramoto	Dave Boyle	Voice
2011	Cars 2	Rod "Torque" Redline	John Lasseter and Brad Lewis	Voice
2012	The Color of Time	Goody	Various	
2013	Oz the Great and Powerful	Winkie Guard	Sam Raimi	Cameo
2013	Evil Dead	Ash Williams	Fede Álvarez	Uncredited cameo; also producer
2015	The Escort	Charles Cooper	Will Slocombe	
2021	Black Friday	Jonathan Wexler	Casey Tebo	Also producer
2021	18½	President Richard Nixon	Dan Mirvish	Voice
2022	Doctor Strange in the Multiverse of Madness	Pizza Poppa Guy	Sam Raimi	Cameo
2023	Evil Dead Rise	Ash Williams	Lee Cronin	Voice; uncredited cameo; also executive producer
2025	A Winnie-the-Pooh Christmas	Owl	Jimmy Gadd and Michael Johnson	Voice
2026	Send Help	Bradley Preston's father	Sam Raimi	Cameo in photographs
2026	Ernie & Emma	Ernie Tyler	Himself	Also producer
2026	Evil Dead Burn		Sébastien Vaniček	Cameo in photographs; also executive producer
2028	Evil Dead Wrath †	—N/a	Francis Galluppi	Executive producer
TBA	Highly Functional †	Chili Youngfield	Marc Forby	Post-production

=== Television ===
Year	Title	Role	Notes
1983	Generations	Alan Stuart	Soap opera
1987	Knots Landing	Joel Benson	Episode: "Say Uncle"
1993–1994	The Adventures of Brisco County, Jr.	Brisco County, Jr.	27 episodes
1995	Lois & Clark: The New Adventures of Superman	Bill Church Jr.	3 episodes
1995	American Gothic	Lt. Drey	Episode: "Meet the Beetles"
1995–1999	Hercules: The Legendary Journeys	Autolycus	10 episodes; also directed 7 episodes
1996	Homicide: Life on the Street	Jake Rodzinsky	Episodes: "Justice Parts 1 & 2"
1996	Tornado!	Jake Thorne	Television film
1996	Assault on Dome 4	Alex Windham	Television film
1996–1997	Ellen	Ed Billik	8 episodes
1996–1999	Xena: Warrior Princess	Autolycus	8 episodes; also directed 2 episodes
1997	Weird Science	Gene the Genie	Episode: "I Dream of Gene"
1997	The Love Bug	Hank Cooper	Television film
1997	Goldrush: A Real Life Alaskan Adventure	Pierce Thomas 'PT' Madison	Television film
1998	Timecop	Agent Tommy Maddox	Episode: "The Future, Jack, the Future"
1998–1999	Hercules: The Legendary Journeys	Rob Tapert	2 episodes
1999	The X-Files	Wayne Weinsider	Episode: "Terms of Endearment"
2000	Jack of All Trades	Jack Stiles / Daring Dragoon	22 episodes; also co-executive producer
2001	Beggars and Choosers	Jack	2 episodes
2001	The Legend of Tarzan	Max Liebling (voice)	Episode: "Tarzan and One Punch Mullargan"
2002	Charmed	FBI Agent Woody Jackman	Episode: "Witch Way Now?"
2002	Terminal Invasion	Jack	Television film
2003	Duck Dodgers	Pork Piggler (voice)	Episode: "K-9 Kaddy/Pig of Action"
2003	My Life as a Teenage Robot	Himcules (voice)	Episode: "Daydream Believer/This Time with Feeling"
2004	Megas XLR	Magnanimous (voice)	2 episodes
2004	Bench Pressly	Bench Pressly (voice)	Pilot
2005	Alien Apocalypse	Dr. Ivan Hood	Television film
2006	Super Robot Monkey Team Hyperforce Go!	Captain Shuggazoom (voice)	2 episodes
2006	Touch the Top of the World	Ed Weihenmayer	Television film
2006	Robot Chicken	Himself / Red Power Ranger / Car Chase Reporter (voices)	Episode: "Dragon Nuts"
2006–2009	The Replacements	Phil Mygrave / Gordo Glideright (voices)	6 episodes
2007	El Tigre: The Adventures of Manny Rivera	The Industrialist (voice)	Episode: "Burrito's Little Helper/Crouching Tigre, Hidden Dragon"
2007–2013	Burn Notice	Sam Axe	111 episodes
2011	Burn Notice: The Fall of Sam Axe	Sam Axe	Television film; also executive producer
2013	1600 Penn	Doug Gilchrist	Episode: "Skip the Tour"
2014	Psych	Dr. Ashford N. Simpson	Episode: "A Nightmare on State Street"
2014	The Librarians	Santa Claus	Episode: "And Santa's Midnight Run"
2015	Last Fan Standing	Presenter	Streaming Amazon Prime 10 episodes
2015	Fargo	Ronald Reagan	2 episodes
2015	Randy Cunningham: 9th Grade Ninja	The Creep (voice)	Episode; "Ball's Well That Friend's Well"
2015–2018	Ash vs Evil Dead	Ash Williams	30 episodes; also executive producer
2018	Eli Roth's History of Horror	Himself	Docuseries; 2 episodes
2018–2020	Rapunzel's Tangled Adventure	King Edmund (voice)	7 episodes
2018	Lodge 49	Gary Green	3 episodes
2019	Ripley's Believe It or Not!	Himself (host)	10 episodes; also executive producer
2020–2021	The Last Kids on Earth	Chef (voice)	11 episodes
2021	Adopted	John Voss	Unaired pilot
2021	A.P. Bio	John Griffin	Episode: "Tons of Rue"
2021	Archer	McGinley (voice)	Episode: "Dingo, Baby, et Cetera"
2021	One December Night	Steve Bedford	Television film
2022	My Southern Family Christmas	Everett Bergeron	Television film
2023	Impractical Jokers	Himself (guest host)	Episode: "Bruce Campbell"
2023	Discontinued	Himself (host)	Streaming series, 10 episodes
2024	Hysteria!	Chief Ben Dandridge	7 episodes
2025–present	Invincible	Satan (voice)	2 episodes

=== Video games ===
Year	Title	Role	Notes
1997	Broken Helix	Jake Burton	—N/a
1998	Pitfall 3D: Beyond the Jungle	Pitfall Harry Jr	—N/a
2000	Tachyon: The Fringe	Jake Logan	—N/a
2000	Evil Dead: Hail to the King	Ash Williams	—N/a
2002	Spider-Man	Tutorial Narrator	—N/a
2003	Evil Dead: A Fistful of Boomstick	Ash Williams	—N/a
2004	Spider-Man 2	Tutorial Narrator	—N/a
2005	Evil Dead: Regeneration	Ash Williams	—N/a
2005	The Incredible Hulk: Ultimate Destruction	Tutorial Narrator	—N/a
2006	The Ant Bully	Fugax	—N/a
2007	Spider-Man 3	Tutorial Narrator	—N/a
2011	Army of Darkness: Defense	Ash Williams	Game Closed
2011	Cars 2	Rod "Torque" Redline	—N/a
2012	The Amazing Spider-Man	The Extreme Reporter	—N/a
2014	TOME: Immortal Arena	Tutorial Narrator	Game Closed
2015	Call of Duty: Advanced Warfare	Lennox	Exo Zombies DLC
2019	Dead by Daylight	Ash Williams	Ash vs Evil Dead DLC
2022	Evil Dead: The Game	Ash Williams	Also producer
2023	Call of Duty: Modern Warfare II	data-sort-value="" style="background: var(--background-color-interactive, #ececec); color: var(--color-base, inherit); vertical-align: middle; text-align: center; " class="table-na" | —N/a	
2023	Call of Duty: Warzone 2.0	data-sort-value="" style="background: var(--background-color-interactive, #ececec); color: var(--color-base, inherit); vertical-align: middle; text-align: center; " class="table-na" | —N/a	

== Awards and nominations ==
Year	Award	Category	Title	Result
1993	Fangoria Chainsaw Award	Best Actor	Army of Darkness	Won
2003	DVD Exclusive Award	Best Audio Commentary (Limited Edition)	The Evil Dead	Nominated
2003	The Comedy Festival	Film Discovery Jury Award for Best Actor	Bubba Ho-Tep	Won
2004	Chlotrudis Award	Best Actor	Bubba Ho-Tep	Nominated
2004	Fangoria Chainsaw Award	Best Actor	Bubba Ho-Tep	Won
2005	Fantasporto Film Festival	International Fantasy Film Award for Best Actor	Bubba Ho-Tep	Won
2007	Ashland Independent Film Festival	Rogue Award		Won
2010	Satellite Awards	Best Supporting Actor – Series, Miniseries or Television Film	Burn Notice	Nominated
2016	Fangoria Chainsaw Award	Best Actor on Television	Ash vs Evil Dead	Won
2016	Saturn Awards	Best Actor on Television	Ash vs Evil Dead	Won
2017	Fangoria Chainsaw Award	Best TV Actor	Ash vs Evil Dead	Won
2017	Saturn Awards	Best Actor on a Television Series	Ash vs Evil Dead	Nominated
2018	Saturn Awards	Best Actor on a Television Series	Ash vs Evil Dead	Nominated

== See also ==
- Make Love! The Bruce Campbell Way (ISBN 0-312-31260-1)
