= Requiem (The X-Files) =

- The X-Files episode
- Mulder notices a mark he made in the road seven years earlier. Fearing that the show was nearing its end, Chris Carter decided to bring back elements from the show's pilot episode to bring the show closure.
- Episode no.: Season 7 Episode 22
- Directed by: Kim Manners
- Written by: Chris Carter
- Production code: 7ABX22
- Original air date: May 21, 2000
- Running time: 44 minutes

Guest appearances
- Mitch Pileggi as Walter Skinner; Leon Russom as Detective Miles; Peter MacDissi as Prison Guard; Laurie Holden as Marita Covarrubias; Nicholas Lea as Alex Krycek; Eddie Kaye Thomas as Gary; Judd Trichter as Richie; Zachary Ansley as Billy Miles; Gretchen Becker as Greta; William B. Davis as The Smoking Man; Sarah Koskoff as Teresa Hoese; Darin Cooper as Ray Hoese; Tom Braidwood as Melvin Frohike; Bruce Harwood as John Fitzgerald Byers; Dean Haglund as Richard Langly; Brian Thompson as Alien Bounty Hunter; Grace and Kelly Demontesquiou as Baby

Episode chronology
← Previous "Je Souhaite"	Next → "Within"
- The X-Files season 7

"Requiem" is the twenty-second episode and the finale of the seventh season of the science fiction television series The X-Files, and the show's 161st episode overall. It premiered on the Fox network in the United States on May 21, 2000. The episode was written by Chris Carter, and directed by Kim Manners. The episode helped to explore the series' overarching mythology. "Requiem" earned a Nielsen household rating of 8.9, being watched by 15.26 million viewers in its initial broadcast. The episode received mostly positive reviews from television critics. Many applauded the way it made the series' increasingly marginalized alien mythology relevant again, although others lamented the partial loss of David Duchovny.

The show centers on FBI special agents Fox Mulder (Duchovny) and Dana Scully (Gillian Anderson) who work on cases linked to the paranormal, called X-Files. Mulder is a believer in the paranormal, while the skeptical Scully has been assigned to debunk his work. In this episode, Mulder and Scully return to the site of their first investigation together when a series of abductions take place. However, Scully's failing health, and Mulder's concern that she is in danger, cause him to take her off the case. Meanwhile, the Cigarette-Smoking Man (William B. Davis)—on his deathbed—reunites with Marita Covarrubias (Laurie Holden) and Alex Krycek in an attempt to revive their alien-human hybrid project.

"Requiem" was a story milestone for the series, featuring the alien abduction of Mulder. Mulder would appear sporadically in the last two seasons, only returning for about half of the episodes in season eight and only two episodes in season nine. Prior to being picked up for another season, however, many believed that the episode would serve as the series finale. As such, many elements from the show's pilot episode were brought in to bring the show closure and help it segue into a movie franchise.

== Plot ==
In Bellefleur, Oregon, Detective Miles, investigating what he believes to be a crashed aircraft, runs into a man who looks like his detective, Ray Hoese. The lookalike is bleeding green fluid, indicating that he is an alien bounty hunter who has taken Hoese's form. Elsewhere, Marita Covarrubias arranges for Alex Krycek to be released from a penal colony. The two then meet with the dying Smoking Man, who expresses his belief that the crashed aircraft—which is revealed to actually be a downed alien spaceship—might allow them to rebuilt the Project.

In Washington, Fox Mulder receives a call from Billy Miles (the son of Detective Miles and former alien abductee whom Mulder had encountered seven years earlier), who expresses his fear that abductions have begun again. Mulder and Dana Scully subsequently travel to Bellefleur, where they meet with Billy's father, "Detective Miles" (unaware that he is actually the disguised Bounty Hunter), and learn that Hoese has since gone missing. When investigating the site of Hoese's disappearance, the agents find evidence that the deputy fired his weapon before vanishing. Soon thereafter, Hoese's wife, Theresa Nemman (another of the 1992 abductees) goes missing, too. Meanwhile, Billy confronts the man who appears to be his father, who reveals himself as the Bounty Hunter before both disappear.

Back in Washington, Krycek tells the agents that the "crashed aircraft" is a UFO being concealed with cloaking technology. Mulder, worried that Scully's past might put her at risk of abduction, refuses to let her return to Oregon, so Walter Skinner accompanies him. Scully and the Lone Gunmen then discover that Mulder, rather than Scully, is in danger at the abduction site. Suddenly, Scully is overcome by nausea and is hospitalized. Elsewhere, at the Watergate complex, Krycek throws the Smoking Man down a flight of stairs, presumably killing him.

In Oregon, Mulder and Skinner locate the energy field concealing the UFO. Mulder passes through it and finds Billy, Theresa, and other abductees standing beneath a pillar of light. Suddenly, the Bounty Hunter appears, and Mulder vanishes with the group as Skinner watches the UFO depart. Later, while recovering in the hospital, Scully tells Skinner that, although she cannot explain it, she is pregnant.

== Production ==
=== Background and writing ===
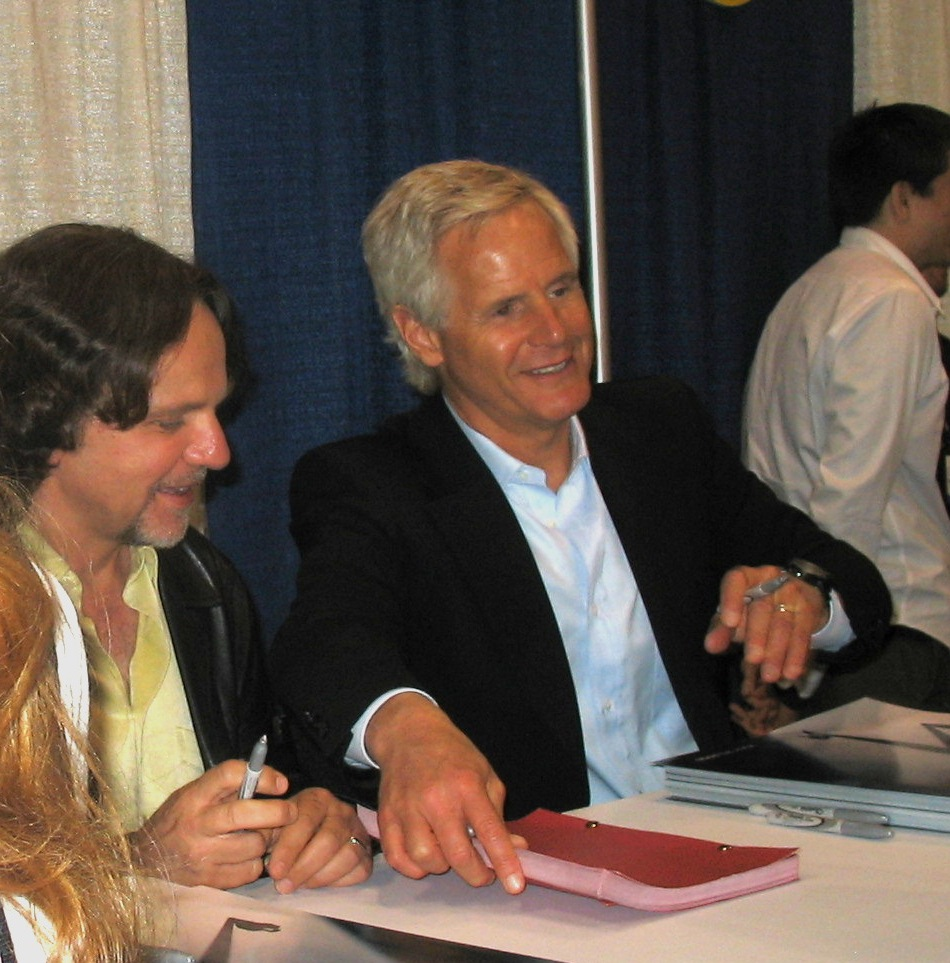
The episode was written by series creator Chris Carter (right).

While filming was underway for the seventh season, many members of the crew felt that the show had entered into its final season. Executive producer Frank Spotnitz later explained that "there was a pretty strong sentiment inside and outside the show that it was time to call it a day." As the season progressed, however, the idea of producing another season emerged. Paul Rabwin explained that, "we found ourselves starting to get energized again. [...] As we got toward the end of the season, everyone was kind of hopeful." As such, when it came time to pen "Requiem", the producers considered several ways to deal with the episode. The first idea was that "Requiem" could serve a series finale. Another idea that emerged was that the episode could end on a cliffhanger, leading into an eighth season or an X-Files movie. The latter idea was chosen, leading to series creator Chris Carter writing "Requiem" as a segue into season eight.

"Someone had sent me some of those YouTube clips that people put together of all the intimate moments between Mulder and Scully. And a few things hit me; one was just the amount of tenderness there was between them. The looks of understanding into each others' eyes and the clarity that we were there for each other; and then there was the number of times we actually did touch hands, or kiss on the cheek or forehead or even on the lips at times. There was a lot of that."

— Gillian Anderson, on the relationship between Mulder and Scully.

"Requiem" attempted to bring closure to several aspects of the series. In one sequence, Alex Krycek throws The Smoking Man down a flight of stairs, presumably to his death. Nicholas Lea, the actor who portrayed Krycek, noted: "That's one of the character's great moments, when I get to push Bill Davis down a set of stairs. In a sense, he has nothing to lose because his life's burned out. So death doesn't have the same terror that it would to a young happy chap." The episode also featured several tender moments between Mulder and Scully, which many fans found "nearly pornographic in the context of their long, chaste courtship", according to Matt Hurwitz and Chris Knowles in their book The Complete X-Files. Gillian Anderson, however, defended the moments, arguing that there was ample amount of romance between Mulder and Scully prior to "Requiem". The ending scene, featuring Scully revealing that she is pregnant, was written the day before it was filmed. Carter held it back because he "didn't want to create something that would let the cat out of the bag and give anybody the opportunity to spoil our fun."

=== Casting and filming ===
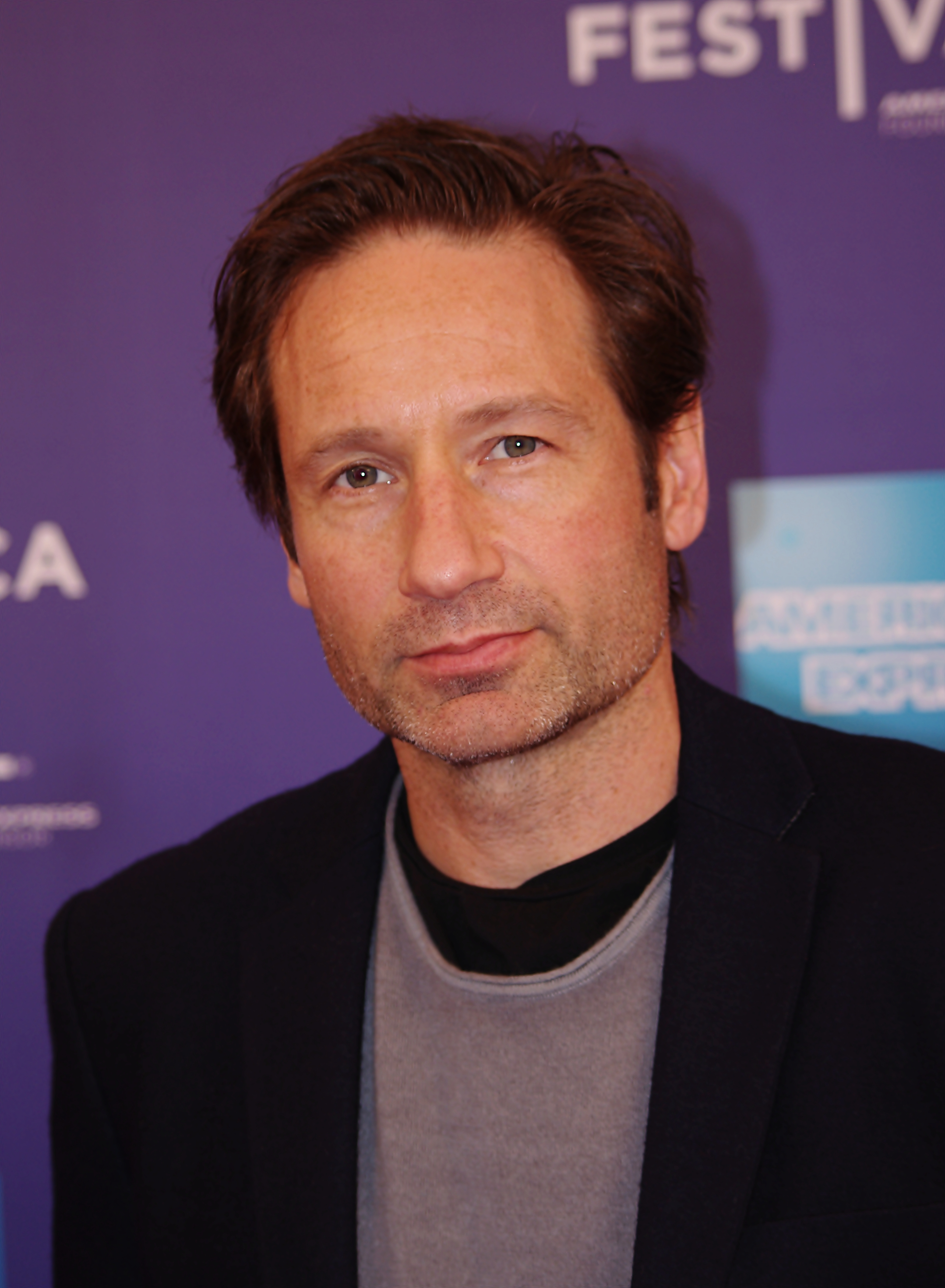
"Requiem" saw the partial departure of David Duchovny's character Fox Mulder by way of alien abduction.

Because there was a chance that the seventh season would be its last, the character of Billy Miles, played by Zachary Ansley and who originally appeared in the pilot episode, was brought back in and featured in "Requiem" to bring the series full-circle. Ansley would also appear in several eighth season episodes as well. After the conclusion of the episode, David Duchovny expressed his desire to leave the series. He explained, "I was kind of a free agent after season seven, and to me, there was not much else to do in terms of the character. So it was really about me wanting to pursue other parts of my career as a writer, director, and actor." Rumors began spreading—which were eventually confirmed—that another character would take Mulder's place. Many fans on the internet believed that Mitch Pileggi, who portrayed Walter Skinner, would take the role; Pileggi later called this guess "ridiculous."

The episode was directed by Kim Manners. Originally, Carter had planned on directing the episode himself, but he eventually felt that it would be better handled by Manners. Manners later noted that he felt "very honored" by this gesture. Principal shooting for the episode began on Soundstage 5 at the Twentieth Century Fox lot on April 20, 2000. Because large parts of this episode as well as the pilot are supposed to take place in the same fictional city of Bellefleur, Oregon. This caused something of an issue, as the pilot had originally been shot on location in Lynn Valley in North Vancouver, British Columbia, in the Lower Seymour Conservation Reserve—formerly known as the Seymour Demonstration Forest. Since production had moved from Vancouver to Los Angeles after the conclusion of the fifth season, a local California location was needed to stand in for Oregon. Consequently, when the cast and crew of the series finished filming at the Fox lot, they relocated to the Big Bear resort, located near Big Bear Lake, California, which was very evocative of Vancouver, thereby providing an "ideal backdrop" for the episode.

The episode featured several elaborate effects, created through both digital and physical means. The scene in which Scully encounters an alien forcefield was created with the use of a special effects harness. Effects producer Bill Millar created many of the special effects for the episode—including shots of the alien craft as well as its interaction with people—in a building in Big Bear. The episode contains a shot of Detective Miles morphing into the alien bounty hunter, which required various shots of Leon Russom and Brian Thompson to be spliced together via blue screen technology. Producer Paul Rabwin called the shot in this episode "one of the best morphs we've ever done."

== Themes ==
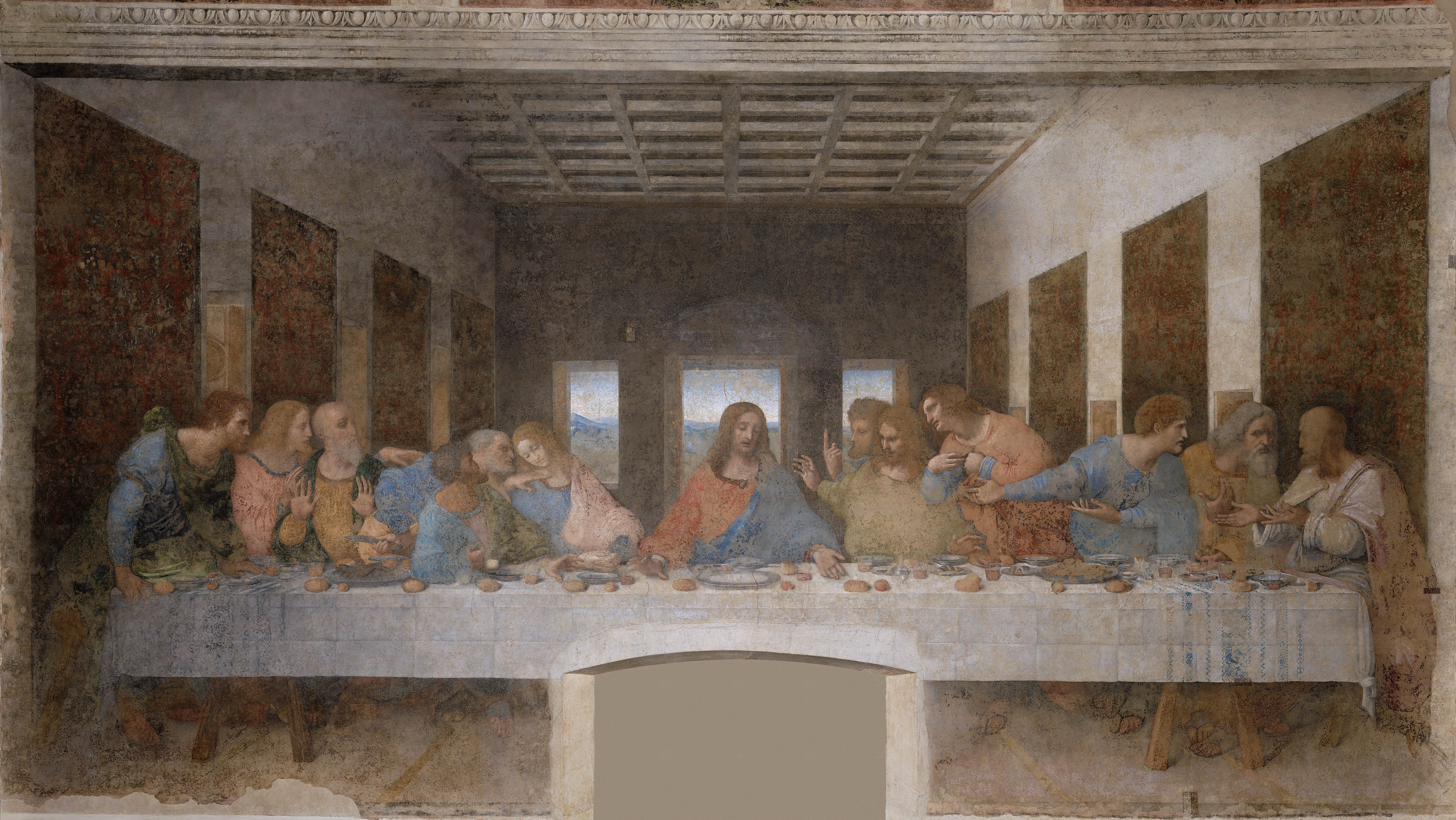
The scene in Skinner's office is a reference to The Last Supper, a painting by Leonardo da Vinci

"Requiem" explores Mulder's desire to leave his pursuit of the truth behind him. Michelle Bush, in her book Myth-X notes that the episode's theme, in a colloquial sense, is Mulder's "realization that maybe it's time to get out of the car". The irony of the episode, however, is that as soon as Mulder discovers absolute proof of alien life, he is subsequently abducted and taken away.

While in Skinner's office, the camera angles and position of the characters recall Leonardo da Vinci's famous painting The Last Supper. Skinner is standing in Saint Peter's spot, and Scully is standing in Judas Iscariot's place. Bush argues that, in this manner, the show is suggesting that Scully, like Judas, directly affects the fate of the savior, in this case Mulder. She notes that Scully's actions result in a fate that "could not be realized without her participation". This is not the first time Scully has been compared to Judas in the show: the earlier episode "The Sixth Extinction II: Amor Fati"—which is heavily based on Nikos Kazantzakis's novel The Last Temptation of Christ—features Scully in a role with direct literary parallels to Kazantzakis's heroic interpretation of Judas.

== Reception ==
=== Ratings ===
"Requiem" first aired on Fox in the United States on May 21, 2000. This episode earned a Nielsen rating of 8.9, with a 14 share, meaning that roughly 8.9 percent of all television-equipped households, and 14 percent of households watching television, were tuned into the episode. It was viewed by 15.26 million viewers. "Requiem" marked a 3.8 percent decrease in viewers from the sixth season finale, "Biogenesis" (Note: "Biogenesis" was viewed by 15.86, whereas "Requiem" was viewed by 15.26 million viewers. Subtracting the two figures and then dividing them by 15.86 million, which represents the largest possible audience, yields a percent decrease of 3.8 percent.) and a 14.4 percent decrease from the seventh season premiere, "The Sixth Extinction." (Note: "The Sixth Extinction" was viewed by 17.82 whereas, "Requiem" was viewed by 15.26 million viewers. Subtracting the two figures and then dividing them by 17.82 million, which represents the largest possible audience, yields a percent decrease of 14.4 percent.) The episode aired in the United Kingdom and Ireland on Sky1 on August 13, 2000, and received 1.00 million viewers, making it the most watched episode that week. On May 13, 2003, the episode was released on DVD as part of the complete seventh season. Two years later the episode was included on The X-Files Mythology, Volume 3 – Colonization, a DVD collection that contains episodes involving the alien colonists.

=== Reviews ===
The episode received mostly positive reviews from critics. Emily St. James of The A.V. Club awarded the episode a "B+". She argued that the episode was "the best season finale cliffhanger the show ever did", and compared it to the second season finale "Anasazi"; she noted that while the latter episode was "pretty amazing", "Requiem" has "a finality" to it and a "sense that nothing will ever be the same" that made its cliffhanger ending work. St. James also wrote that the references to the pilot episode helped to show how far the series had evolved in seven years. Tom Kessenich, in his book Examinations, gave the episode a largely positive review. Despite lamenting the loss of Fox Mulder, he noted that "the truth is The X-Files has been a show like no other and 'Requiem' proved once again there truly is a place for magic and beauty and love on the small screen and I am delighted to have witnessed it for seven seasons now." Kessenich later named the episode one of the "Top 25 Episode of All Time" of The X-Files, ranking it at number 20.

Kenneth Silber from Space.com called the episode "intriguing" and felt that while "The X-Files "foundered" for a large portion of its seventh season, "Requiem" marked "a much-needed return to that mythology," and that it set "the stage for what might be an interesting eighth season." Rich Rosell from DigitallyObsessed.com awarded the episode 4.5 out of 5 stars and wrote that "A lot of characters out of the woodwork come back for the season-ending cliffhanger [...] But that's all window-dressing for a trio of big surprises that wrap up Season 7, in what many consider the show's death knell, or perhaps just a proper ending." Robert Shearman, in his book Wanting to Believe: A Critical Guide to The X-Files, Millennium & The Lone Gunmen, rated the episode four stars out of five. The author noted that, despite the fact that it capped-off a "lacklustre" season, the episode still managed to provide a good enough cliffhanger to hold fans until the premiere of the eighth season. Shearman further noted that "against the odds, after all the disappointments of the year, 'Requiem' is strong enough to leave its audience wanting more."

Paula Vitaris from Cinefantastique gave the episode a more mixed review and awarded it two stars out of four. Despite noting that the episode was "the best mytharc episode and season finale in years", she called the episode's finale "one of the most egregious missteps yet in The X-Files mythology".

== Bibliography ==
- Bush, Michelle (2008). Myth-X. Lulu. ISBN 9781435746886.
- Donaldson, Amy (2007). "The Last Temptation of Mulder". In Yang, Sharon (ed.). The X-Files and Literature: Unweaving the Story, Unraveling the Lie to Find the Truth. Cambridge Scholars Publishing. ISBN 9781847182395.
- Gradnitzer, Louisa; Pittson, Todd (1999). X Marks the Spot: On Location with The X-Files. Arsenal Pulp Press. ISBN 9781551520667.
- Hurwitz, Matt; Knowles, Chris (2008). The Complete X-Files. Insight Editions. ISBN 9781933784724.
- Kessenich, Tom (2002). Examinations: An Unauthorized Look at Seasons 6–9 of the X-Files. Trafford Publishing. ISBN 9781553698128.
- Meisler, Andy (2000). The End and the Beginning: The Official Guide to the X-Files Volume 5. Harper Prism. ISBN 9780061075957.
- Shapiro, Marc (2000). All Things: The Official Guide to the X-Files Volume 6. Harper Prism. ISBN 9780061076114.
- Shearman, Robert (2009). Wanting to Believe: A Critical Guide to The X-Files, Millennium & The Lone Gunmen. Mad Norwegian Press. ISBN 9780975944691.
