= The Truth (The X-Files) =

- The X-Files episodes
- Episode nos.: Season 9 Episodes 19 & 20
- Directed by: Kim Manners
- Written by: Chris Carter
- Production codes: 9ABX19; 9ABX20
- Original air date: May 19, 2002
- Running time: 87 minutes

Guest appearances
- William B. Davis as The Smoking Man; Nicholas Lea as Alex Krycek; James Pickens Jr. as Alvin Kersh; Laurie Holden as Marita Covarrubias; Matthew Glave as Kallenbrunner; Jeff Gulka as Gibson Praise; Chris Owens as Jeffrey Spender; Steven Williams as X; Tom Braidwood as Melvin Frohike; Dean Haglund as Richard Langly; Bruce Harwood as John Fitzgerald Byers; Adam Baldwin as Knowle Rohrer; Alan Dale as Toothpick Man; Patrick St. Esprit as Dark-Suited Man; Julia Vera as Indian Woman; William Devane as General Mark A. Suveg

Episode chronology
← Previous "Sunshine Days"	Next → "My Struggle"
- The X-Files season 9

"The Truth" is the two-part season finale of the ninth season of the American science fiction television series The X-Files. "The Truth", the 19th and 20th episodes of the season and the 201st and 202nd episodes overall, originally served as the series finale for the series until The X-Files was revived in January 2016. First aired together on the Fox network on May 19, 2002, the episodes were written by series creator Chris Carter and directed by Kim Manners. "The Truth" was the most-watched episode of the ninth season and was seen by 13.25 million viewers upon its initial broadcast. The finale received mixed reviews, with many commentators criticizing the episode's lack of closure, though the full return of actor David Duchovny to the series, as well as the episode's conclusion, received praise.

The show centers on FBI special agents who work on unsolved paranormal cases called X-Files; this season focuses on the investigations of John Doggett (Robert Patrick), Monica Reyes (Annabeth Gish), and Dana Scully (Gillian Anderson). In this episode, Walter Skinner (Mitch Pileggi) and Scully learn that Mulder—who has been missing for almost a year—has been placed under military arrest for the supposed murder of Knowle Rohrer (Adam Baldwin), one of the government's secret "Super Soldiers". Mulder breaks out of prison with the help of Skinner, Reyes, Doggett, Scully and Alvin Kersh (James Pickens Jr.). Mulder and Scully travel to New Mexico where helicopters destroy an Anasazi cliff dwelling ruin along with The Smoking Man (William B. Davis).

The episode featured the return of Duchovny—following his departure after the eighth-season finale—as well as several other recurring characters. "The Truth" served to conclude many long-time story arcs while creating new ones for a possible film franchise. Shooting took place at various California locales, including a hydroelectric power plant east of Fresno and Anza-Borrego Desert State Park. Carter would return to The X-Files universe with its second feature film, The X-Files: I Want to Believe (2008); a prospective third film, which would have focused on the impending extraterrestrial invasion revealed in "The Truth", was ultimately supplanted by a tenth season (2016).

== Plot ==
At the Mount Weather government complex, Fox Mulder (David Duchovny) arrives with several government officials. He gains access to highly classified documents on a secure computer system, and is shocked and dismayed to read the documents, which provide details of the impending colonization of the planet by alien forces. Before he can continue reading, Mulder hears another person approaching. He hides quickly and observes Knowle Rohrer (Adam Baldwin), a former friend of John Doggett (Robert Patrick) but who has been irreversibly transformed into an enemy "Super Soldier", approach the computer system. Rohrer immediately realizes the system has been accessed. Mulder attempts to attack Rohrer, but Rohrer overpowers him. Mulder frantically flees, but Rohrer outflanks him. In a violent altercation, Mulder flips Rohrer off a catwalk onto high-voltage wiring, and Rohrer apparently dies by electrocution. Mulder attempts to escape, but is quickly arrested by U.S. Marines.

News of Mulder's arrest spreads to the FBI. Upon hearing that he has resurfaced, and in such a dire manner, Dana Scully (Gillian Anderson) and Walter Skinner (Mitch Pileggi) visit him in military custody. During his time in captivity, Mulder receives mysterious visits from two phantoms of his past: Alex Krycek (Nicholas Lea) and X (Steven Williams). Meanwhile, Scully and Skinner go to great lengths to get him released, but are unsuccessful. Mulder's fate is ultimately made the subject of a military tribunal with Deputy Director Alvin Kersh (James Pickens Jr.) in charge. At the outset, it appears Mulder will become the hopeless victim of a show trial stacked against him.

Skinner takes Mulder's defense, while Scully, Doggett, Monica Reyes (Annabeth Gish), Marita Covarrubias (Laurie Holden), Gibson Praise (Jeff Gulka) and Jeffrey Spender (Chris Owens) testify on Mulder's behalf. The prosecution presents Rohrer's body as evidence against Mulder. Aware that Rohrer is a seemingly invincible "Super Soldier", Scully performs a medical examination and proves that the body is not that of Rohrer. Despite this, the evidence is rejected, given that the autopsy was not authorized, and the defense is overruled. Mulder is sentenced to death for the "murder" of Rohrer. Later, Doggett, Skinner, Reyes, and Scully help Mulder escape, with the unexpected help of Kersh who regretted helping to convict Mulder. Despite being advised to immediately leave the continent via Canada, Mulder instead takes Scully to New Mexico. On their way, Mulder receives a visit by three additional ghosts: The Lone Gunmen, who advise him to flee for his life rather than continue his pursuit of the truth. Mulder politely declines. Meanwhile, Doggett and Reyes find their office emptied, suggesting that the X-Files have been closed down for the third time.

Mulder and Scully arrive at Anasazi ruins to find a "wise man" who they believe can make sense of the classified documents Mulder has read. They discover the so-called "wise man" is none other than The Smoking Man (William B. Davis), who, still alive after all, is hiding out to survive the colonization—an event that will happen on December 22, 2012, the predicted end of the world. Outside, Reyes and Doggett arrive and prepare to fight Rohrer, who has been sent to kill Mulder and The Smoking Man. Rohrer is killed when the magnetite in the ruins affects his superhuman body. Mulder and Scully flee in a separate car to Doggett and Reyes, while black helicopters destroy the cliff dwellings and The Smoking Man within.

In a motel room in Roswell, New Mexico, Mulder and Scully prepare for bed and talk. Mulder explains his belief "that the dead are not lost to us. That they speak to us as part of something greater than us—greater than any alien force. And if you and I are powerless now, I want to believe that if we listen to what's speaking, it can give us the power to save ourselves." Despite their slim chance for success, Mulder declares, "Maybe there's hope", as they lie back, content in each other's arms, in a loving embrace.

== Production ==
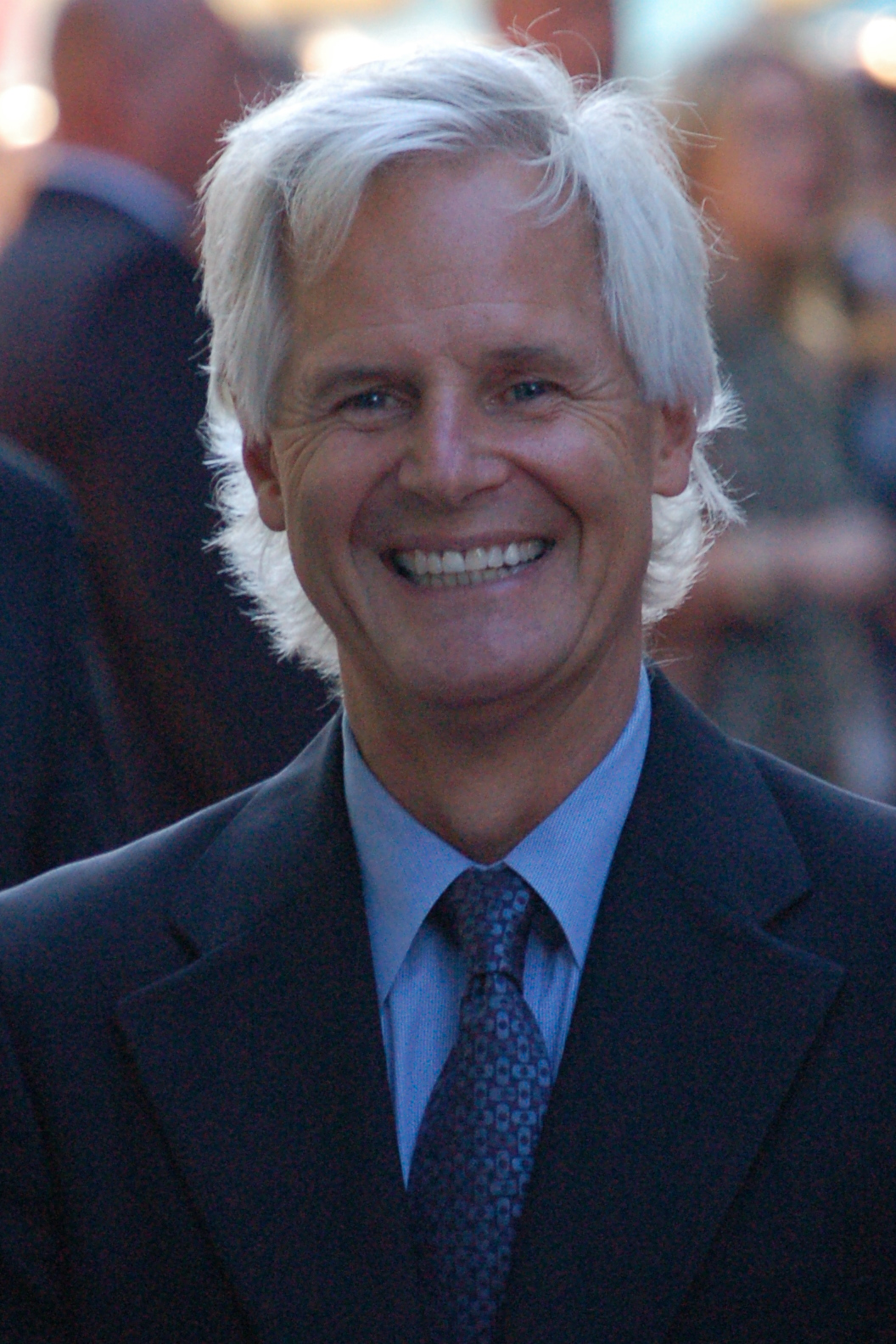
Chris Carter wrote the episode and noted that "it was strange to be writing these things knowing it was the last time".

=== Writing ===
The episode was written by series creator Chris Carter. He noted, "It's the end—you don't get another chance. So you'd better put everything you've ever wanted to put in into the episode. There were things to distract us from what was really going on. The band was breaking up." He expounded on the idea, and he decided "it was probably time to go [...] it was strange to be writing these things knowing it was the last time we'd see Scully doing certain things or hear Mulder saying certain things." Spotnitz explained that Carter made the announcement in January so that "we had time to wrap our minds around the end and plan for it and give all of the characters their due." Gish later said, "I have a great respect for the elegant way in which they're closing the curtain". Actor Bruce Harwood, who played John Fitzgerald Byers on the show, called the finale the "passing of a generation".

Several of the episode's scenes feature elements that refer to the earlier installments. The final scene in which Mulder and Scully speak in a hotel room is reminiscent of the series' pilot episode. Furthermore, in "The Truth", it is revealed to Mulder by The Smoking Man that the aliens plan to colonize the earth on December 22, 2012, an event that, according to the show, the Mayans predicted. This is a throw-back to the second season episode "Red Museum", which featured members of a new religious movement who believed that the year 2012 would bring about the dawning of the New Age.

Before the release of the 2008 film The X-Files: I Want to Believe, Carter expressed an intent to make a third X-Files feature film that would focus on the impending alien invasion revealed in this episode, depending on the success of The X-Files: I Want to Believe. Following the release of The X-Files: I Want to Believe, Carter, Spotnitz, Duchovny, and Anderson all expressed their interest in making one. However, on January 17, 2015, Fox Television Group chairman and CEO Gary Newman revealed that there was network interest in reviving The X-Files, not as a movie franchise, but as a limited run television event.

=== Casting ===
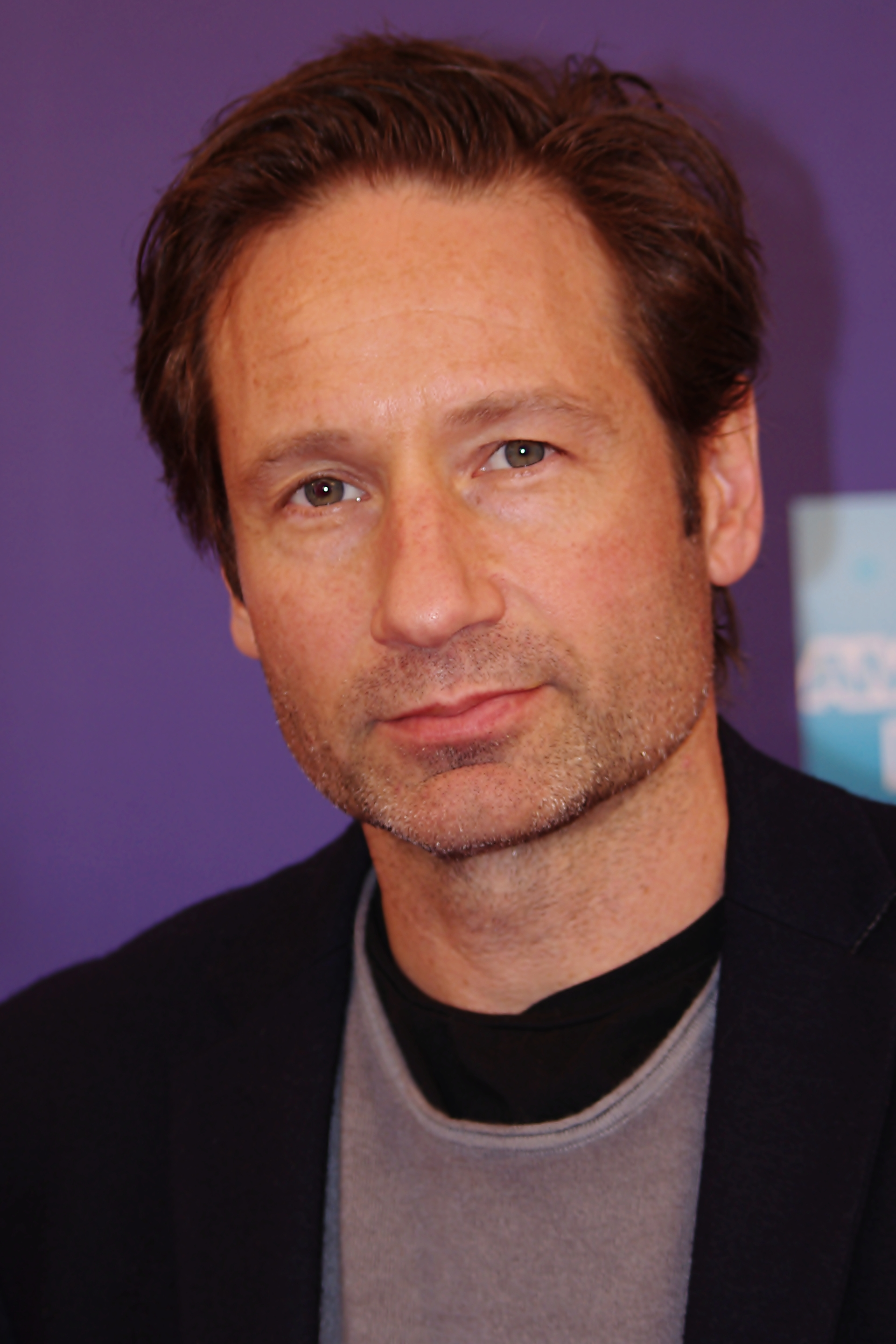
"The Truth" marked David Duchovny's return as Fox Mulder.

With this episode, Duchovny rejoined the main cast of The X-Files after his departure following the eighth season finale "Existence". The episode marks the only time that all five principal actors—Duchovny, Anderson, Patrick, Gish, and Pileggi—are credited together in the opening titles. Mulder, Scully, and the Smoking Man are the only characters to appear in both this episode and the series' pilot. This episode is the fourth of only four episodes in season nine where Duchovny appeared, the others being "Trust No 1", "Jump the Shark", and "William". Duchovny appeared in the first two via archival footage and only made a small cameo in the third. The episode marks the return of several characters who had either previously been killed off or had left the show, including X, who was killed in the season four opener "Herrenvolk"; Alex Krycek, who was shot and killed by Skinner in the eighth-season finale "Existence"; The Smoking Man, who was purportedly killed in "Requiem"; Gibson Praise, who was last seen in the eighth-season episode "Without"; The Lone Gunmen, who were killed off in the ninth-season episode "Jump the Shark"; Jeffrey Spender, who originally was killed off in the sixth season episode "One Son" but reappeared in the ninth-season episode "William"; and Marita Covarrubias, who last appeared in the seventh season finale "Requiem".

Originally, this episode was to feature the recurring character Shannon McMahon. Actress Lucy Lawless became pregnant shortly after filming the two-part episode, "Nothing Important Happened Today" and was not available for subsequent episodes. Julia Vera was called in to play the role of the woman who is helping the Smoking Man live in the Anasazi ruins. Vera had previously appeared in the sixth season two-part episode "Dreamland". She later called the opportunity "amazing" and declared that "my greatest experience was The X-Files". The final scene of the episode was originally going to feature the Toothpick Man, the alien leader of the New Syndicate played by Alan Dale, informing U.S. President George W. Bush, played by actor Gary Newton, of Mulder's escape. The scene was filmed, but was not included in the broadcast version; executive producer Frank Spotnitz later said that he was "so happy" that the producers cut the scene, noting that—despite "a lot of debate about it, on both sides"—the scene was unable to top the final scene with Mulder and Scully. On the DVD's audio commentary, the producers mentioned that they had considered filming the shot on the Oval Office set created by The West Wing, a serial drama created by Aaron Sorkin that was originally broadcast on NBC. In addition, they originally wanted to have Martin Sheen appear as his character on The West Wing, Josiah Bartlet, instead of Bush, noting that the cameo would have been "a nice, sort of wink" to the television audience. Despite being cut from the final episode, the shot was featured as a deleted scene on the season nine video release.

=== Filming ===
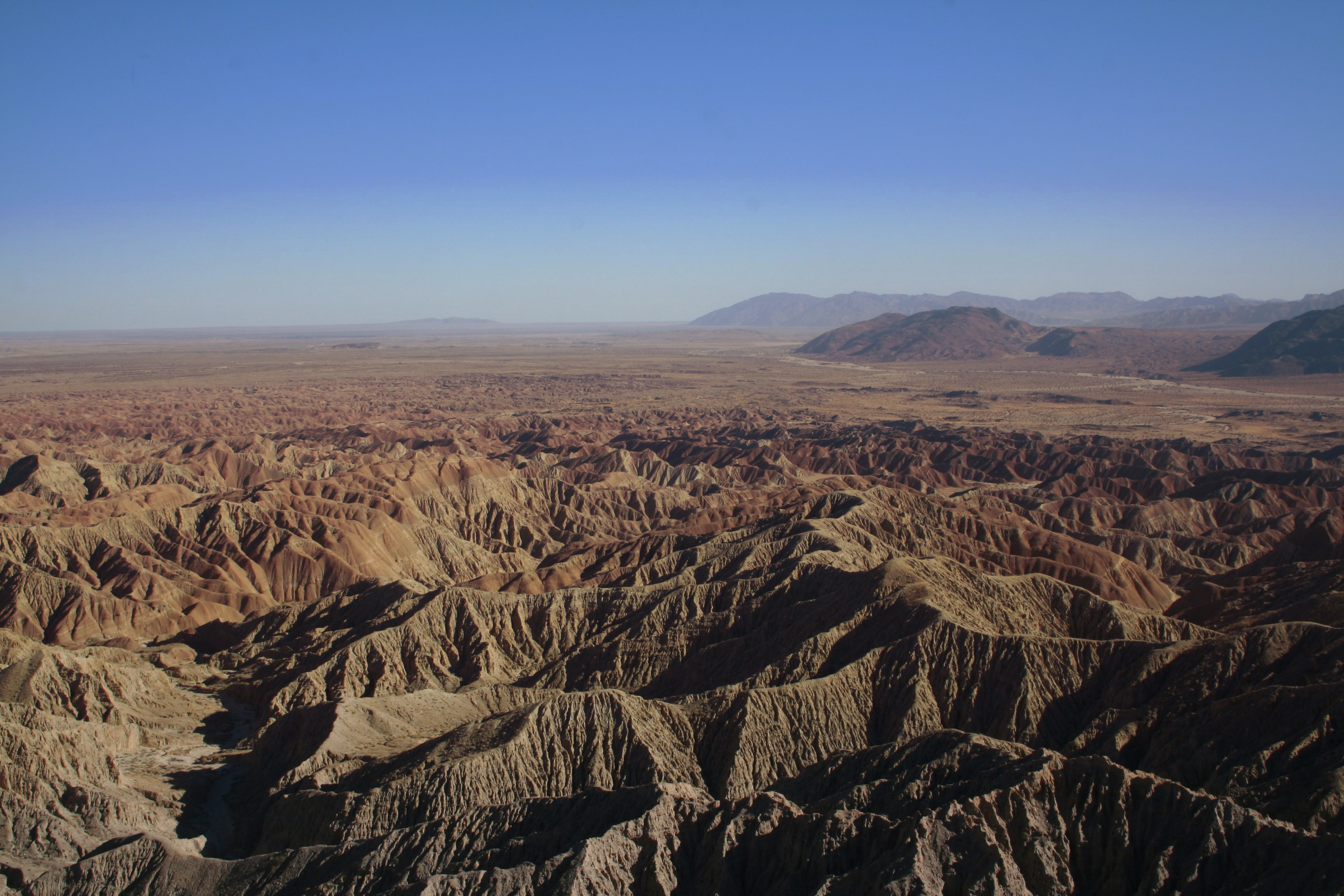
The Anasazi ruins were filmed at Anza-Borrego Desert State Park.

The episode—like the rest of seasons six through nine—was filmed in Los Angeles. The first scene, featuring Mulder breaking into a military base, was shot inside a hydroelectric power plant in the Sierras east of Fresno, California. The rooms that were featured in the episode were the main rooms for the power plant, which The X-Files design team redecorated; the crew later called the set the "war room". Most of the decoration and interior scene was done by the visual effects crew; the only visible part seen in real life was a large sump pump. Bill Roe, the cinematographer for the episode, spent "four or five days lighting [the] set" for filming. Kim Manners called his work "a great job".

The scenes that take place in the main computer terminal room were shot on a 20th Century Fox sound stage, whereas the scenes with Mulder being tortured by the military guards were shot at Fort MacArthur, a former military base in San Pedro, California, that was decommissioned in 1974, (Note: Fort MacArthur: 33.7120°N 118.2962°W) including The Marine Mammal Care Center located at Fort MacArthur. (Note: The Marine Mammal Care Center: 33.7169°N 118.2965°W) Filming the court room was one of the "most challenging sequences" Manners had ever done. Carter wanted the courtroom to have no spectators and no jury. This meant that Manners had to shoot each scene with a limited number of actors and make them look "fresh". Manners was terrified to film the 40-page long courtroom scene, pointing out that the show was basically re-telling a nine-year history of The X-Files. Corey Kaplan designed the set.

The faux Anasazi ruins were constructed inside Anza-Borrego Desert State Park in southern California. (Note: Anza-Borrego Desert State Park: 33.2565°N 116.3991°W) Location manager Mac Gordon later noted that, due to the presence of a rare "spiny black horned toad" in the area, he and his crew were required to hire several biologists to locate any lizards in the area and move them elsewhere. In addition, Gordon had a difficult time persuading the park rangers to allow them to build and then blow up faux-ruins. He explained, "we were on a state park property that was an off road park, with motorcycles and [All-terrain vehicles] flying all over the place, but they still blanched when I said we have to build Indian ruins and then blow it up."

The cameo of The Smoking Man, however, was filmed on the 20th Century Fox sound stage. Manners noted that Davis had "a hell of a time" trying to smoke his cigarettes through a hole in his neck, because the hole was "phony". The scene featuring The Smoking Man being burnt up by the fire from a missile was done via computer animation. The missiles were created via CGI technology by animator Mat Beck. The helicopter, however, included real smoke bombs. A shot of William B. Davis was overlapped with fire, and eventually a skull to give the effect that The Smoking Man's flesh was burnt away. Paul Rabwin later called the scene a "great sequence".

The last scene of the episode shot was between Anderson and Duchovny and was called "extremely tough" by Manners, due to it being "very emotional". He noted that the scene "sums up the series" about a "man who believed and a woman who was skeptical but became a believer". The scene was filmed at an actual motel, called La Cresenta. The location had previously been used in episodes "Sein Und Zeit" and "This is Not Happening".

== Analysis ==
I want to believe that... the dead are not lost to us. That they speak to us... as part of something greater than us—greater than any alien force. And if you and I are powerless now, I want to believe that if we listen to what's speaking, it can give us the power to save ourselves.

— Fox Mulder. The line received philosophical attention due to its perceived religious undertones.

The final scene, featuring a conversation between Mulder and Scully, has been examined by author V. Alan White due to its perceived religious undertones. In the book The Philosophy of The X-Files, he notes that the final scene "undermines Mulder's seemingly persistent scorn of traditional" religion and his subtle acceptance of theism. In previous episodes—mainly those dealing with Scully's Catholicism—Mulder shows a lack of approval when it came to the concept of organized religion, often pointing out that "theologians can be just as dogmatic as scientists" when it comes to unexplained phenomena. White proposes that this needling may be intentional on Mulder's part, as a form of "ironic reversal of [Scully's] skepticism about the paranormal". However, the final lines of "The Truth" see Mulder talking about a belief in "something greater than us, greater than any alien force". White also points out the fact that during this scene Mulder grabs Scully's gold cross, an icon that symbolizes her belief through much of the series.

== Reception ==
=== Ratings ===
"The Truth" was originally aired on the Fox network on May 19, 2002, and became the most-watched episode of the ninth season, receiving the season's highest Nielsen ratings. Nielsen ratings are audience measurement system that determine the audience size and composition of television programming in the United States. "The Truth" earned a household rating of 7.5, meaning that it was seen by 7.5 percent of the nation's estimated households. It was viewed by a total of 13.25 million viewers in the United States. On the date of its airing, the episode ranked third in its timeslot, behind the season finale of Survivor: Marquesas and the heavily promoted reunion of The Cosby Show. "The Truth", however, placed ahead of the season finale of The Practice. The episode was included on The X-Files Mythology, Volume 4 – Super Soldiers, a DVD collection that contains installments involved with the alien "Super Soldiers" arc.

=== Reviews ===
The entry received mixed reviews by critics; the main reason for criticism was that, instead of creating a conclusion, the episode raised new questions for the audience. Robert Shearman, in his book Wanting to Believe: A Critical Guide to The X-Files, Millennium & The Lone Gunmen, gave the episode a scathing review and awarded it one star out of five. Despite calling the opening "promising", Shearman derided the episode's ending—especially the revelation of alien colonization of December 22, 2012—writing, "is this really what the series was about?" Furthermore, Shearman concluded that the problem with the episode was that the show, which he called "brilliant—frequently, truly brilliant," decided "to define itself in the summing up" with the episode, which did not answer very many questions.

In 2011, UGO named the episode the fourteenth "Worst Series Finale" and wrote that the episode—and the show's eighth and ninth seasons by extension—were negatively affected by the series' lack of a defining plot line. The article noted that, while the episode claimed to wrap up the story arcs for the series, "the trial of Mulder ultimately resulted in very little satisfying payoff to the series' overarching mysteries". In 2022, the episode was included on Variety's list of the worst series finales, with staff writer Peter Debruge primarily criticizing it for its lack of closure. Joyce Millman, writing for The New York Times, after the premiere of "The Truth", said of the show: "The most imaginative show on television has finally reached the limits of its imagination."

Not all reviews were critical. Julie Salamon of The New York Times gave the episode a positive review. Salamon noted that "Until the end, the series maintained its mesmerizing visual gloominess, cleverly punctuated with suggestive plays of color and light". She claimed the show "also retained its conspiracy-theory heart that has appealed so greatly to viewers". John C. Snider of SciFiDimensions praised the episode, stating "'The Truth' is a satisfying conclusion to the series, with plenty of twists and turns, a few surprise guest appearances, and an explosive finale complete with requisite black helicopters. The romantics among us will also be pleased with the culmination of the Mulder/Scully relationship". In 2011, the finale was ranked number twenty-two on the TV Guide Network special, TV's Most Unforgettable Finales.

== Bibliography ==
- Fraga, Erica (2010). LAX-Files: Behind the Scenes with the Los Angeles Cast and Crew. CreateSpace. ISBN 9781451503418.
- Hurwitz, Matt; Knowles, Chris (2008). The Complete X-Files. San Rafael, CA: Insight Editions. ISBN 978-1933784809.
- Shearman, Robert (2009). Wanting to Believe: A Critical Guide to The X-Files, Millennium & The Lone Gunmen. Des Moines, IA: Mad Norwegian Press. ISBN 978-0975944691.
- White, V. Alan (2007). "Freedom and Worldviews in The X-Files". In Kowalski, Dean A. (ed.). The Philosophy of The X-Files. Lexington, KY: University Press of Kentucky. ISBN 978-0813124544.
