= The X-Files season 9 =

Season of television series

The X-Files
- Season 9
- DVD cover
- Starring: Gillian Anderson; Robert Patrick; Annabeth Gish; Mitch Pileggi; David Duchovny
- No. of episodes: 20

Release
- Original network: Fox
- Original release: November 11, 2001 – May 19, 2002

Season chronology
- ← Previous; Season 8 Next → Season 10

The ninth season of the American science fiction television series The X-Files commenced airing in the United States on November 11, 2001, concluded on May 19, 2002, and consists of twenty episodes. The season takes place after Fox Mulder (David Duchovny) goes into hiding, following the events of the eighth season finale, "Existence". As such, the main story arc for the season follows Dana Scully (Gillian Anderson), John Doggett (Robert Patrick), and Monica Reyes (Annabeth Gish) on their hunt to reveal a government conspiracy involving the elaborate and malevolent creation of "Super Soldiers".

After only appearing intermittently in the preceding season, Duchovny chose not to return; however, following the series' cancelation he appeared in the finale, "The Truth". Anderson also intended to leave the show prior to its cancelation. Doggett and Reyes accordingly became the show's central characters, and former recurring character Walter Skinner (Mitch Pileggi) became a main character.

Season nine received mixed reviews from critics and garnered a negative reaction from many long-time fans and viewers, partially due to Duchovny's absence. During this year, ratings for the season fell dramatically. Critics blamed it on what they considered an increasingly incoherent story arc, while the cast and crew ascribed the drop in viewership to the September 11 attacks. Regardless, Fox eventually decided to cancel the series.

During the airing of season eight, Carter and The X-Files production team created and aired a spinoff titled The Lone Gunmen. The show was unsuccessful and was canceled before any story arcs were resolved, but The X-Files episode "Jump the Shark" was written to give closure to the series. The X-Files storyline was continued with the 2008 theatrical film The X Files: I Want to Believe and later with a tenth season in 2016 and an eleventh season in 2018.

== Plot overview ==
After the eighth season finale "Existence", Fox Mulder (David Duchovny) goes into hiding. Dana Scully (Gillian Anderson) is again reassigned to the FBI Academy, and Monica Reyes (Annabeth Gish) becomes John Doggett's (Robert Patrick) new FBI partner in the X-Files office. Doggett asks Scully for help on a case involving an EPA official, Carl Wormus (Nicholas Walker), who died after his car was forced off a bridge by a woman he picked up. Doggett and Walter Skinner (Mitch Pileggi) travel to a reclamation plant, looking for links between Wormus' work and death. After doing an illegal autopsy on Wormus, Alvin Kersh (James Pickens, Jr.) sends Brad Follmer (Cary Elwes) to locate Doggett. The investigation at the reclamation plant leads to an unknown woman, whose identity is later revealed to be Shannon McMahon (Lucy Lawless), one of Doggett's former Marine associates. She reveals to Doggett that she is a "Super Soldier". This leads them to a clandestine laboratory where a secret experiment is taking place on board a naval ship. They later find connections between the experiments on the ship and Scully's child, William.

"The show has been Mulder's quest for the truth. It was that for seven years and for part of the eighth year. But I really think that with the introduction of John Doggett last year, [...] a baton was passed [...] literally he [Mulder] handed over the X-Files office to Doggett."
— Frank Spotnitz talking about the possibility of a "Mulder-less" season.

After Scully begins to miss Mulder, a complete stranger—the "Shadow Man" (Terry O'Quinn)—offers his service to drive Mulder out of hiding. Scully takes the offer, but unknowingly gets herself and Mulder in even more danger. The "Shadow Man", is revealed to be a "Super Soldier" bent on killing Scully and Mulder. After a chase through a quarry, the "Shadow Man" is destroyed after being exposed to magnetite. Later, Scully, Doggett, and Reyes find evidence of a dangerous UFO cult which has uncovered a second spacecraft similar to one Scully studied in Africa three years ago. Misled by the FBI, the agents enlist the help of The Lone Gunmen to protect Scully's son after they learn that the cult intends to kill the child. The cult, however, is successful in kidnapping the child. Concurrent with these events, Doggett is run over by a car, which sends him to the hospital. As Follmer and the "Toothpick Man" (Alan Dale) try to uncover the plans of the three agents, Scully and Reyes leave Washington, D.C. to find Scully's son.

Doggett finds a strange disfigured man in the X-Files office; believing he is Mulder, Scully has his DNA tested, and the results reveal him to have the same pattern as Mulder. The disfigured man sticks a needle into William, which the other agents believe to be a virus of some kind, but it is later revealed to be a cure for William's powers. The unnamed man is later revealed to be Jeffrey Spender (Chris Owens), Mulder's half-brother. In the season finale, Mulder returns from hiding in the attempts of finding classified information at an army base. He is caught, however, after allegedly killing an apparently indestructible "Super Soldier", which causes him to be tried before a military tribunal. With the help of Kersh, Scully, Reyes, Doggett, Spender, Marita Covarrubias (Laurie Holden) and Gibson Praise (Jeff Gulka), Mulder breaks out, and Mulder and Scully travel to New Mexico to find an old "wise man", later revealed to be the "Cigarette Smoking Man" (William B. Davis). He tells the two that aliens will begin colonizing the planet on December 22, 2012. Cigarette Smoking Man appears to be killed by a missile, launched under the command of Knowle Rohrer (Adam Baldwin), who is revealed to be alive and well. Mulder and Scully escape, but become fugitives on the run from the FBI. The final scene of the season features the two in a motel room facing an uncertain—but possibly hopeful—future.

== Production ==
=== Development ===
Following the eighth season of The X-Files, David Duchovny announced that he would be completely leaving the show. As such, the future of the show was up in the air. Before greenlighting a ninth season, neither the Fox Network nor any of the Ten Thirteen Productions members knew if creator Chris Carter would return for another season. With this being said, he encouraged the other members of the crew to continue the series without him. Eventually, however, several crew members began to develop new script ideas for the ninth season, many of which excited Carter. This new-found enthusiasm eventually caused Carter to sign a contract with Fox for another year. Likewise, Anderson signed on at the last minute, with her contract extension only lasting until the end of 2002; she specifically stated that she would leave the show following the conclusion of the season. Filming took place in 2001, including on the day of the September 11 attacks. Due to the changes in the cast, during the ninth season Doggett and Reyes became the series' new leads. Executive producer Frank Spotnitz speculated that the show could extend into a tenth and possibly eleventh season, if the show was able to attract an audience. However, the show lost viewers and was eventually cancelled by Fox.

With the news of the impending end of the series, the crew members decided to wrap up long-running plots. "Jump the Shark", the final episode to feature the Lone Gunmen, served as a de facto series finale for the cancelled X-Files spin-off series The Lone Gunmen. Executive producer and co-writer Frank Spotnitz had to fight to get the episode made; the studio informed Spotnitz that they did not want to bring the characters back in any capacity, as Fox reportedly "hated [the] characters". Similarly, "Release" was written to create closure to the story of the murder of Doggett's son.

The show's crew and actors had a range of opinions about the show's finale, "The Truth". Carter said of the finale, "It's the end—you don't get another chance. So you'd better put everything you've ever wanted to put into the episode. There were things to distract from what was going on. The band was breaking up." Gish said, "It did feel like a big movie set. We were on location, there was an enormous budget, and everyone came back." Davis said, "It was great that they brought us all back in the finale, that they found a way to get us all in again." Pileggi said, "I can remember the last day on the set. We shot a scene with Gillian and myself, and that was it. And then I had to say goodbye to another family, another crew. I almost teared up, and Gillian was standing there looking at me saying 'Okay, go ahead, big guy; get through this.' It was tough." Patrick said, "It was pretty euphoric, and sad, and all those emotions you can imagine. A chapter's closing, and we're all moving on to something new and exciting. And yet we were all going to miss each other." Kim Manners called the final scene "truly one of the most emotional experiences I've ever witnessed in my life." Former lead actor Duchovny said, "In some ways, psychically I didn't really leave. It was nice to be able to – I'm just really happy that I was able to come back and finish it."

=== Casting ===
With "Nothing Important Happened Today", the style of the opening credits was changed from the original credits, which, more or less, had been the same for the previous eight seasons. The credits included new graphics as well as new cards for Gish and Pileggi. In addition, Elwes was cast to portray the new recurring character, Brad Follmer, an Assistant Director at the FBI, and Alan Dale was also written into the show as a new "villain", the "Toothpick Man". Lucy Lawless was cast as the intended-recurring character Shannon McMahon, but she became pregnant after filming the season premiere, and—due to her high-risk pregnancy—had to leave the series.

After the departure of Duchovny, the show garnered much criticism by fans and critics alike, with many saying that the bond between Mulder and Scully was what actually kept the show together for the first seven seasons of the show. Realizing his importance in the series, Chris Carter and his crew opened negotiations with Duchovny in the hopes that he would reprise his character for the finale. Initially, they were unsure if he would appear, but he eventually elected to return. Spotnitz said, "My impression from talking to him was that he still cares about the show. He's still invested in it and certainly cares about [Mulder]. And I think he recognized that it was the best thing for the show and the audience [for him] to come back and give closure to nine years of the series." Not only did Duchovny return for the finale, he also returned to write and direct the episode "William"; he even had a small cameo in the episode, appearing as a reflection in Scully's eye. Three episodes later, Duchovny returned as an actor for the season finale, "The Truth".

=== Crew ===
Chris Carter served as executive producer and showrunner for the season and wrote nine episodes, including the two-part season premiere and season finale, as well as important mytharc episodes. Spotnitz continued as executive producer and wrote seven episodes, plus receiving story credit for an additional episode. Vince Gilligan continued as executive producer and wrote three episodes. John Shiban was promoted to executive producer and wrote two episodes, plus receiving story credit for an additional episode. David Amann was promoted to supervising producer and wrote two episodes. Steven Maeda was promoted to executive story editor and wrote two episodes. A former writer for The Lone Gunmen Thomas Schnauz joined the writing staff as a story editor and wrote two episodes. Duchovny received story credit for a single episode.

Manners continued as co-executive producer and directed the most of episodes of the season with eight, including the two-part season finale. Tony Wharmby directed three episodes. Series creator Chris Carter directed two episodes. Co-executive producer Michelle MacLaren and series writer John Shiban each made their directorial debuts, directing one episode. Series writers Frank Spotnitz and Vince Gilligan each directed an episode, after previously directing their first episodes in the previous season. The remaining episodes were directed by Dwight Little, Cliff Bole, and cast member David Duchovny.

== Cast ==
=== Main cast ===
==== Starring ====
- Gillian Anderson as Special Agent Dana Scully
- Robert Patrick as Special Agent John Doggett
- Annabeth Gish as Special Agent Monica Reyes
- Mitch Pileggi as Assistant Director Walter Skinner (Note: Pileggi is only credited for the episodes he appears in.)
- David Duchovny as Special Agent Fox Mulder (Note: Duchovny is featured in the opening credits for the two-part season finale only. He also has a small uncredited cameo in "William", and appears in archive footage in "Trust No 1" and "Jump the Shark".)

==== Also starring ====
- James Pickens, Jr. as Alvin Kersh
- Nicholas Lea as Alex Krycek
- William B. Davis as Cigarette Smoking Man

=== Recurring cast ===
- Cary Elwes as Assistant Director Brad Follmer
- Tom Braidwood as Melvin Frohike
- Bruce Harwood as John Fitzgerald Byers
- Dean Haglund as Richard Langly
- Alan Dale as Toothpick Man

==== Guest starring ====
- Adam Baldwin as Knowle Rohrer
- Jeff Gulka as Gibson Praise
- Sheila Larken as Margaret Scully
- Lucy Lawless as Shannon McMahon
- Chris Owens as Jeffrey Spender
- Laurie Holden as Marita Covarrubias
- Michael McKean as Morris Fletcher
- Steven Williams as X

== Episodes ==
Episodes marked with a double dagger (‡) are episodes in the series' Alien Mythology arc. (Note: The episodes were included in the DVD collection The X-Files Mythology, Volume 4 – Super Soldiers, released by Fox.)

No. overall	No. in season	Title	Directed by	Written by	Original release date	Prod. code	U.S. viewers (millions)
183	1	"Nothing Important Happened Today"‡	Kim Manners	Chris Carter & Frank Spotnitz	November 11, 2001	9ABX01	10.60
John Doggett begins his investigation of Deputy Director Alvin Kersh and search for Fox Mulder.
184	2	"Nothing Important Happened Today II"‡	Tony Wharmby	Chris Carter & Frank Spotnitz	November 18, 2001	9ABX02	9.41
Shannon McMahon, a former Marine associate of Doggett's, reveals to Doggett that she is a "Super Soldier." This leads them to a clandestine laboratory where secret experiments are taking place aboard a naval ship.
185	3	"Dæmonicus"	Frank Spotnitz	Frank Spotnitz	December 2, 2001	9ABX03	8.67
With Dana Scully reassigned to the Quantico Training Academy, Doggett and Monica Reyes investigate their first X-File together—a series of satanic ritual killings.
186	4	"4-D"	Tony Wharmby	Steven Maeda	December 9, 2001	9ABX05	8.74
A vicious murderer threatens Doggett and Reyes and then vanishes. Doggett is shot and Brad Follmer discovers that Reyes' gun was used.
187	5	"Lord of the Flies"	Kim Manners	Thomas Schnauz	December 16, 2001	9ABX06	9.94
Scully, Doggett and Reyes investigate when a teenager dies while performing a daredevil feat for a television show, but his death is soon revealed to be caused by a disturbing family secret.
188	6	"Trust No 1"‡	Tony Wharmby	Chris Carter & Frank Spotnitz	January 6, 2002	9ABX08	8.35
Scully is hopeful about reuniting with Mulder when a complete stranger offers new information about what drove him into hiding. Yet her trust in the stranger may place Mulder in even more danger. The tagline of this episode is "They're Watching."
189	7	"John Doe"	Michelle MacLaren	Vince Gilligan	January 13, 2002	9ABX07	8.67
With no knowledge of his identity or his past, Doggett is found wandering a dusty Mexican town. While he struggles to piece together his memory, he finds himself embroiled in a smuggling plot. Across the border Scully and Reyes attempt to find him.
190	8	"Hellbound"	Kim Manners	David Amann	January 27, 2002	9ABX04	7.78
Reyes takes the lead while investigating an X-File case surrounding a man found skinned alive. When she discovers that he had visions of a similar thing, she calls on Scully's expertise to help with the investigation.
191	9	"Provenance"‡	Kim Manners	Chris Carter & Frank Spotnitz	March 3, 2002	9ABX10	9.72
When rubbings from the spaceship resurface, the FBI hides its investigation from the X-Files. Meanwhile, Scully is forced to take drastic measures when she discovers a threat to William.
192	10	"Providence"‡	Chris Carter	Chris Carter & Frank Spotnitz	March 10, 2002	9ABX11	8.44
Distrustful of both Skinner and Follmer, Scully circumvents the FBI's investigation into William's kidnapping and performs her own, assisted by Reyes and The Lone Gunmen.
193	11	"Audrey Pauley"	Kim Manners	Steven Maeda	March 17, 2002	9ABX13	7.99
Awakening in a surreal hospital—which a companion believes to be Death's Waiting Room—after being hit by a car, a comatose Reyes struggles to wake herself up before her organ donor card is acted upon.
194	12	"Underneath"	John Shiban	John Shiban	March 31, 2002	9ABX09	7.29
Doggett is determined to find an error in the DNA evidence that freed the convicted "Screwdriver Killer", whom he nearly caught in the act 13 years earlier.
195	13	"Improbable"	Chris Carter	Chris Carter	April 7, 2002	9ABX14	8.62
In the race to catch a serial killer, Scully and Reyes find themselves relying on numerology, their powers of deduction, and a mysterious, card-playing stranger.
196	14	"Scary Monsters"	Dwight Little	Thomas Schnauz	April 14, 2002	9ABX12	8.24
Special agent Leyla Harrison takes Reyes and Doggett on a drive into the mountains after a woman stabs herself repeatedly and her widowed husband refuses to let anyone see their son.
197	15	"Jump the Shark"	Cliff Bole	Vince Gilligan & John Shiban & Frank Spotnitz	April 21, 2002	9ABX15	8.59
When Morris Fletcher approaches the agents with information related to the "Super Soldiers", they turn to The Lone Gunmen. But the Gunmen are already knee-deep in a bio-terrorist's plot which has links to the mysterious Yves Adele Harlow.
198	16	"William"‡	David Duchovny	Story by : David Duchovny & Frank Spotnitz & Chris Carter; Teleplay by : Chris Carter	April 28, 2002	9ABX17	9.68
Doggett finds a strange, disfigured man in the X-Files office and, on a whim of Scully's, they test his DNA. The surprising answers they find become even more surprising when William's life is put on the line.
199	17	"Release"	Kim Manners	Story by : John Shiban & David Amann; Teleplay by : David Amann	May 5, 2002	9ABX16	7.78
When one of Scully's students displays an inordinate ability to profile serial killers, his insights reopen the homicide case of Doggett's son, Luke.
200	18	"Sunshine Days"	Vince Gilligan	Vince Gilligan	May 12, 2002	9ABX18	10.33
Doggett, Reyes, Scully and Skinner stumble on to a bizarre homicide case where the main suspect is Oliver Martin, a man with an unusual obsession with The Brady Bunch.
201 202	19 20	"The Truth"‡	Kim Manners	Chris Carter	May 19, 2002	9ABX19 9ABX20	13.25
After not knowing Mulder's whereabouts for the last year, Skinner and Scully learn he's being held for the homicide of a military man he couldn't possibly have killed: Knowle Rohrer, one of the government's secret "Super Soldiers." Mulder breaks out of prison with the help of Skinner, Reyes, Doggett, Scully and Alvin Kersh. Mulder and Scully travel to New Mexico where Black helicopters destroy an Anasazi cliff dwelling ruin along with the Cigarette Smoking Man.

== Reception ==
=== Ratings ===
The first episode of the season, "Nothing Important Happened Today", gathered 10.6 million viewers, whereas the second part gathered 9.4 million viewers. On May 19, 2002, the series finale, "The Truth", aired, and the Fox Broadcasting Company confirmed that The X-Files was not being renewed for a tenth season. When talking about the beginning of the ninth season, Chris Carter said, "We lost our audience on the first episode. It's like the audience had gone away, and I didn't know how to find them. I didn't want to work to get them back because I believed what we are doing deserved to have them back." "The Truth" received the highest Nielsen household rating and viewership numbers of the season. It earned a 7.5 rating and gathered 13.25 million viewers in the United States. The loss of viewers resulted in this season seeing a 30 percent ratings drop when compared to the eighth season.

=== Reviews ===
Sabadino Parker from PopMatters, when commenting on the series finale, said, "It's also for the good, because The X-Files has long been but a pale reflection of the show it once was." Brian Linder from IGN was more positive to the ninth season, saying that the series could still have aired if the writers created a new storyline for Robert Patrick and Annabeth Gish's character, which The X-Files crew did not do and continued what was seen by many critics as tiresome. Aaron Kinney from Salon magazine was more negative to the new season, even joking about the new female lead, calling her a "peppy new female presence." Entertainment Weekly reviewer Ken Tucker said the show operated in what he called "quaint territory", speculating that Chris Carter was the only one who seemed to understand the complex mytharc. Elizabeth Weinbloom from The New York Times concluded with, "shoddy writing notwithstanding, it was this halfhearted culmination of what was once a beautifully complicated friendship", between Mulder and Scully, ended remaining interest in what was a "waning phenomenon". Another review from The New York Times said of the show, "The most imaginative show on television has finally reached the limits of its imagination." The A.V. Club listed the ninth season and the 2008 film The X-Files: I Want to Believe as the "bad apple" of The X-Files, describing the ninth season as "clumsy mish-mash of stuff that had once worked and new serialized storylines about so-called 'super soldiers'". M.A. Crang, in his book Denying the Truth: Revisiting The X-Files after 9/11, noted that season nine "does not have a great reputation among viewers". However he argued that the season contains a few "hidden gems" and praised those episodes which dealt with new material, while criticising other entries for focusing too heavily on "plotlines and characters from years gone by".

== DVD release ==
The X-Files – The Complete Ninth Season
Set details		Special features
20 episodes; 7-disc set; 1.78:1 aspect ratio; Subtitles: English, Spanish; English (Dolby Digital 2.0 Surround)		"The Truth About Season Nine" Documentary; Documentary on "The Truth"; Audio Commentaries (Dolby Digital 2.0 Stereo); "Improbable" – Chris Carter; "Jump the Shark" – Vince Gilligan, Frank Spotnitz, John Shiban; "The Truth" – Kim Manners; 9 special effects clips; 10 deleted scenes; Character profiles; 38 promotional television spots
Release dates
Region 1	Region 2	Region 4
May 11, 2004	June 7, 2004	July 27, 2004

== Bibliography ==
- Fraga, Erica (2010). LAX-Files: Behind the Scenes with the Los Angeles Cast and Crew. CreateSpace. ISBN 9781451503418.
- Hurwitz, Matt; Knowles, Chris (2008). The Complete X-Files. Insight Editions. ISBN 978-1-933784-80-9.
- Kessenich, Tom (2002). Examination: An Unauthorized Look at Seasons 6–9 of the X-Files. Trafford Publishing. ISBN 1-55369-812-6.
