= Scary Monsters (The X-Files) =

- The X-Files episode
- Episode no.: Season 9 Episode 14
- Directed by: Dwight H. Little
- Written by: Thomas Schnauz
- Production code: 9ABX12
- Original air date: April 14, 2002
- Running time: 43 minutes

Guest appearances
- Robert Beckwith as FBI Cadet; Gavin Fink as Tommy Conlon; Jolie Jenkins as FBI Agent Leyla Harrison; Scott Paulin as Jeffrey Conlon; Brian Poth as Gabe Rotter; Steve Ryan as Sheriff Jack Coogan

Episode chronology
← Previous "Improbable"	Next → "Jump the Shark"
- The X-Files season 9

"Scary Monsters" is the fourteenth episode of the ninth season of the American science fiction television series The X-Files. It originally aired on the Fox network on April 14, 2002. It was written by Thomas Schnauz and directed by Dwight H. Little. The episode is a "monster-of-the-week" episode, a stand-alone plot which is unconnected to the mythology, or overarching fictional history, of The X-Files. The episode earned a Nielsen household rating of 5.1 and was viewed by 8.2 million viewers in its initial broadcast. It received mixed to positive reviews from television critics.

The show centers on FBI special agents who work on cases linked to the paranormal, called X-Files; this season focuses on the investigations of John Doggett (Robert Patrick), Monica Reyes (Annabeth Gish), and Dana Scully (Gillian Anderson). In this episode, Special Agent Leyla Harrison (Jolie Jenkins) takes Reyes and Doggett on a drive into the mountains after a woman stabs herself repeatedly and her widowed husband refuses to let anyone see their son. The three soon discover that the boy's imagination can bring killer bug-like creatures to life.

The idea for "Scary Monsters" stemmed from an idea that became the episode's teaser. Fellow writer Vince Gilligan suggested making Tommy the episode's villain. Originally, the story featured Doggett and Reyes investigating the case with a new agent. Executive producer Frank Spotnitz suggested to Schnauz that the new FBI agent should be Leyla Harrison, played by Jolie Jenkins, who had first appeared in the Spotnitz-penned eighth season episode "Alone". The writing staff used Leyla's character to comment on the state of the show and, most notably, the members of the audience who preferred Fox Mulder (David Duchovny) over Doggett.

== Plot ==
In his room in Fairhope, Pennsylvania, young boy Tommy Conlon (Gavin Fink) believes he sees a monster reflected in his mirror. He calls for his dad, Jeffrey Conlon (Scott Paulin), who looks under the bed and sees a crawling bug-like creature. He lies to his son, telling him that he sees nothing, and tells Tommy to go back to sleep. Tommy sees the creature again and calls for his dad; Jeffrey holds the door shut as Tommy bangs on the door.

Meanwhile, Agent Leyla Harrison (Jolie Jenkins) tells Dana Scully (Gillian Anderson) about a woman who stabbed herself repeatedly. Harrison insists that the case is an X-File and that the woman was killed by monsters that her son Tommy saw. She also believes that the monster killed the family cat, Spanky. Scully dismisses Harrison's claims, so Harrison dupes John Doggett (Robert Patrick) and Monica Reyes (Annabeth Gish) into investigating.

Doggett, Reyes, and Harrison arrive at the Conlon residence in Fairhope, Pennsylvania. The agents talk to Tommy and conclude that something is going on. They soon discover that their car will not start. Back at her apartment, Scully is visited by Gabe Rotter (Brian Poth), a potential suitor of Harrison's. He presents Scully with the corpse of Spanky. Scully does an ad hoc necropsy and concludes that the cat bit its stomach open to try to get something out. She also discovers a cavity, where it appears something had lived inside the cat.

Doggett, Reyes, and Harrison camp out at the Conlon's house and soon witness the monsters: large, silverfish-like creatures that multiply when shot by Doggett. Alerted by Scully, the local sheriff (Steve Ryan) arrives, but a scuffle ensues. The sheriff draws a gun, and Doggett gut punches him, only to have his hand go completely through the man's stomach. Upon investigation, Reyes is unable to find any organs in the man's body. Tommy shows Reyes the pictures he has been drawing. They include the sheriff with a gun, insect creatures, and Reyes with an insect creature bursting from her body. Reyes asks Tommy why he would imagine such things, and Tommy replies because he is very scared.

Suddenly, the sheriff's body disappears, and Reyes doubles over in pain. Doggett and Harrison pull up her shirt to reveal movement in her abdomen, as if something is trying to get out. Harrison then begins to bleed from her eyes. Doggett approaches Tommy, orders him to stop, and follows him down the hall when he fails to stop. Doggett follows Tommy into a room, but plummets into a blackened abyss where he is attacked by the insects. However, due to Doggett's skepticism, he is able to fight off the illusion. Because he does not believe they are real, they cease to be real. Doggett explains to Jeffrey that all of the creatures are imaginary and are produced by Tommy's imagination. This includes the bugs, the "sheriff" who had no organs, and Reyes's and Harrison's ailments. Jeffrey's wife and their cat Spanky killed themselves trying to remove the insect creatures, believing they were real.

Doggett tricks and subdues Tommy by pretending to set the house on fire. He pours a gas canister filled with water over the floor and furniture, acting as though it is gasoline. Because Tommy believes it to be real, when Doggett lights a match, he sees an inferno surrounding him in the living room. Tommy passes out in fear. Tommy is eventually transported to a psychiatric ward where his imagination is suppressed by watching a wall of television screens.

== Production ==
=== Writing ===
"Scary Monsters" was written by Thomas Schnauz, who had previously penned the ninth-season episode "Lord of the Flies". The entry was directed by Dwight H. Little, his first and only directing credit for the series. Schnauz explained that before the episode was green-lit, the writing staff needed to get the script done as quickly as possible, but Schnauz only had the teaser conceived. When he went to pitch it, he even had a "whole other story that wasn't working." Fellow writer Vince Gilligan suggested that Shnauz make the child the root of all of the episode's problems. However, the writing staff did not want the story to develop into a "kid-in-the-cornfield" territory, according to Gilligan (a reference to a 1961 episode of The Twilight Zone entitled "It's a Good Life", in which a monster-child can control the world. When the writers began to piece the script together, they realized that they needed a villain, and the only character that could play the part would be Tommy.

=== Filming ===
Schnauz's original story featured Doggett and Reyes investigating the case with a new agent. Executive producer Frank Spotnitz suggested to Schnauz that the new FBI agent should be Leyla Harrison, played by Jolie Jenkins. Harrison, who had first appeared in the Spotnitz-penned eighth season episode "Alone", was created and named in memory of an Internet fan of The X-Files and prolific writer of fan fiction of the same name, who had died of cancer on February 10, 2001. Jenkins' character, according to Spotnitz, brought out the "Clint [Eastwood]" in Robert Patrick's character John Doggett and her performance was called "near perfection" by Spotnitz during the audio commentary for "Alone". Near the end of "Scary Monsters", Leyla and Gabe Rotter were supposed to walk off-screen, holding hands, which prompted series director Kim Manners to sardonically ask "when did this turn into the fucking Brady Bunch?" The sequence was subsequently cut.

The writing staff used Leyla's character to comment on the state of the show and, most notably, the members of the audience who preferred Fox Mulder (David Duchovny) over Doggett. Due to Harrison's extensive knowledge of the X-Files, the episode contains several references to previous episodes. Harrison suggests early on that Doggett and Reyes may be dealing with a person capable of channeling electricity, a reference to the third season episode "D.P.O." Doggett later suggests that the three of them may be experiencing some sort of hallucination, and cites the events in the sixth season episode "Field Trip" as an example. Finally, when Tommy shows Reyes his drawing, he tells her "I made this", a possible reference to the tagline at the end of every Ten Thirteen Production.

During the filming of the episode, The X-Files was canceled by the Fox network, meaning that the show would not return for a tenth season. Robert Patrick explained that series creator Chris Carter watched him film a scene—an act which he had reportedly not done since Patrick had been hired in 2000—and then informed him of the news. Patrick noted that Fox's new show 24 was being heavily promoted instead of The X-Files, an act which he felt was like being "abandoned by Fox".

== Broadcast and reception ==
"Scary Monsters" originally aired in the United States on the Fox network on April 14, 2002, and was first broadcast in the United Kingdom on BBC Two on February 16, 2003. The episode's initial broadcast was viewed by approximately 5.4 million households (Note: At the time of airing, the estimated number of households was 105.5 million. Thus, 5.1 percent of 105.5 million is 5.4 million households.) and 8.2 million viewers, making it the fifty-seventh most watched episode of television that aired during the week ending January 27. "Scary Monsters" earned a Nielsen household rating of 5.1, meaning that it was seen by 5.1% of the nation's estimated households.

The episode received mixed to positive reviews from television critics. Jessica Morgan from Television Without Pity awarded the episode a "C−" grade. Robert Shearman and Lars Pearson, in their book Wanting to Believe: A Critical Guide to The X-Files, Millennium & The Lone Gunmen, rated the episode four stars out of five. The two enjoyed Schnauz's script, calling it "better than most" of season nine's episodes, and noted that he wrote it with "pace and wit". They noted, however, that the entry's self-references "feel like carping […] at the audience who are still left to complain." Despite this, Shearman and Pearson also positively critiqued several of the episode's juxtapositions, such as the scene featuring Scully performing an autopsy on a cat while wearing a kitchen apron that says "something smells goooood", calling them "the funniest of the season". M.A. Crang, in his book Denying the Truth: Revisiting The X-Files after 9/11, called the episode a "solid little entry", saying that it was a "nice spin on the isolation stories that the series has always done so effectively".

== Bibliography ==
- Fraga, Erica (2010). LAX-Files: Behind the Scenes with the Los Angeles Cast and Crew. CreateSpace. ISBN 9781451503418.
- Hurwitz, Matt; Knowles, Chris (2008). The Complete X-Files. Insight Editions. ISBN 978-1933784809.
- Shearman, Robert; Pearson, Lars (2009). Wanting to Believe: A Critical Guide to The X-Files, Millennium & The Lone Gunmen. Mad Norwegian Press. ISBN 978-0975944691.
