= Jump the Shark (The X-Files) =

- The X-Files episode
- Episode no.: Season 9 Episode 15
- Directed by: Cliff Bole
- Written by: Vince Gilligan; John Shiban; Frank Spotnitz
- Production code: 9ABX15
- Original air date: April 21, 2002
- Running time: 44 minutes

Guest appearances
- Bruce Harwood as John Fitzgerald Byers; Tom Braidwood as Melvin Frohike; Dean Haglund as Richard Langly; Stephen Snedden as Jimmy Bond; Zuleikha Robinson as Yves Adele Harlow; Michael McKean as Morris Fletcher; Jim Fyfe as Kimmy Belmont; Pamela Paulshock as Brittany

Episode chronology
← Previous "Scary Monsters"	Next → "William"
- The X-Files season 9

"Jump the Shark" is the fifteenth episode of the ninth season of the American science fiction television series The X-Files. The episode first aired in the United States on April 21, 2002 on the Fox network. It was written by executive producers Vince Gilligan, John Shiban and Frank Spotnitz, and directed by Cliff Bole. The episode is a "monster-of-the-week" episode—unconnected to the series' wider mythology—and was created to give closure for The Lone Gunmen television series, which was a spin-off of The X-Files. The episode earned a Nielsen rating of 5.1 and was viewed by 8.6 million viewers. The episode received mixed to negative reviews from television critics.

The show centers on FBI special agents who work on cases linked to the paranormal, called X-Files; this season focuses on the investigations of John Doggett (Robert Patrick), Monica Reyes (Annabeth Gish), and Dana Scully (Gillian Anderson).

In this episode, Doggett and Reyes attempt to locate a female friend of The Lone Gunmen after former Area 51 Man-in-Black Morris Fletcher appears and claims that she is actually a super-soldier. What Doggett and Reyes soon discover is a bizarre plot to unleash a biological weapon via the use of grafted shark organs.

"Jump the Shark" features the death of The Lone Gunmen—popular recurring characters who first appeared in the first season episode "E.B.E.", although this plot was later retconned in the comic book series The X-Files Season 10. The episode proved difficult to make because, after the cancellation of The Lone Gunmen television series, Fox was adamant that the characters not have a featured role back on The X-Files. (The characters did appear in four previous season 9 episodes, but always very briefly.) The choice to kill off the trio was controversial. Writers Spotnitz and Gilligan later revealed some regret with the way the episode was handled. However, actors Bruce Harwood and Dean Haglund were happy with the way the episode ended. The episode title is a humorous reference to the phrase "jumping the shark", which is used to describe shows that are in decline and therefore try a gimmick to get attention.

== Plot ==
The episode begins with Morris Fletcher (Michael McKean) on a boat in the Bahamas, where he is accosted by armed men and his vessel is blown up. When he is rescued and detained, he approaches FBI agents Monica Reyes (Annabeth Gish) and John Doggett (Robert Patrick) with information related to the Super Soldiers in exchange for his release. Doggett and Reyes turn to The Lone Gunmen when Fletcher provides an alleged photo of the Super Soldier, whom the Gunmen recognize as Yves Adele Harlow (Zuleikha Robinson), a fellow hacker who disappeared a year before. The Gunmen refuse to believe the evidence, especially when they find that Fletcher provided it, although the agents continue to pursue the trail.

Meanwhile, Harlow murders a biology professor, cuts out an organ and disposes of it in a furnace. After the Gunmen capture her, she reveals that the biology professor had been experimenting with the immune system of sharks and had been grafting pieces of shark onto his body in order to become a living host to a biological weapon. His research had been funded by Harlow's arms-dealing father, who had commissioned Fletcher to find her and prevent her from stopping his biological terrorism plot. She further informs them that there is another host, whom she is trying to identify and locate before he can unleash his deadly payload.

Once Fletcher realizes that he has been used by Harlow's father, he teams with the Gunmen to help her find the second bio-terrorist. After a few false starts and chases, the Gunmen corner the bio-terrorist with only a few minutes before his virus is due to be released. They realize that they lack the time to destroy his virus-filled organ and therefore pull a fire alarm, causing large emergency doors to seal shut, simultaneously containing the virus and entrapping them with it. Their sacrifice earns them a final resting place in Arlington National Cemetery, where Fletcher, Doggett, Reyes, Harlow, Dana Scully (Gillian Anderson), Walter Skinner (Mitch Pileggi), and Jimmy Bond (Stephen Snedden) pay their respects to them.

== Comic book alternate universe ==
In the comic book adaptation of the series The X-Files Season 10—which takes place in an alternate universe after the events of The X-Files: I Want to Believe—it is revealed that the Lone Gunmen are alive and well, having faked their deaths during the events of "Jump the Shark". The group was aided by the FBI and have since been working underground, aiding the US government; for instance, Langly mentions that he was responsible for the Stuxnet virus in 2010. (The X-Files Season 10 comic series is not considered canon due to the television tenth and eleventh seasons reaffirming their deaths in the series.)

== Production ==
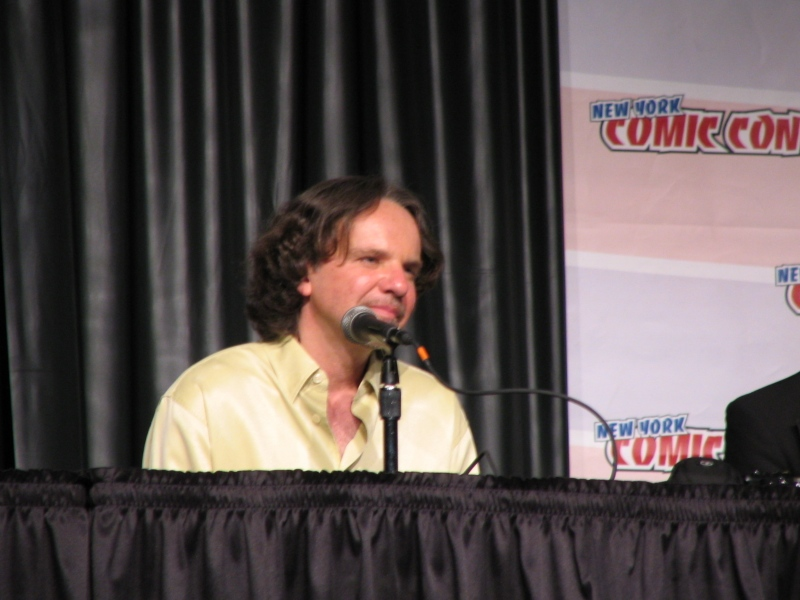
Executive producer Frank Spotnitz, one of the co-writers of the episode, had to contest Fox in order to get the episode made, due to the studio's disdain for the characters.

"Jump the Shark" was written by Vince Gilligan, John Shiban, and Frank Spotnitz; it was directed by Cliff Bole. After the cancellation of The Lone Gunmen television series, which aired in 2001, Fox reportedly "hated [the] characters". Executive producer and co-writer Frank Spotnitz had to fight to get the episode made, as the studio was not interested in bringing the characters back for the ninth season. Actor Bruce Harwood later explained that "I think if the studio objected to anything, it was wasting time on our characters long enough to kill us off." Co-writer Gilligan later recalled "The Lone Gunmen was still kind of an open wound for me." Thus, the episode was crafted as a way to wrap up the series. Due to the nature of the episode—which effectively works as a tie-in—various long-term characters from both The X-Files and The Lone Gunmen make cameo appearances.

The episode title is a humorous reference to the phrase "jumping the shark", coined when Fonzie did a water ski jump of a shark pen on the television series Happy Days. The phrase is used to describe shows that have peaked and are in decline. Executive producer Chris Carter said that the title was tongue-in-cheek, and further stated that it was their "way of lowering the boom on anybody who thought that it did". He further stated that the series was "good" until the end, even after the departure of David Duchovny as Fox Mulder. According to IGN, the episode's title was an homage to the popular website Jump the Shark. In fact, during the commentary for "Jump the Shark", Vince Gilligan makes a direct reference to the website.

Various plotlines leaked before the episode's release, the most notable being the death of the Lone Gunmen. The choice to kill off the trio was controversial; Gilligan himself later admitted that "I still think we made the wrong choice on that one." Spotnitz later said, "I can't say I regret killing them off, as you know, no one really dies in The X-Files [...] But I do feel tonally it was a mistake to end the episode on such a somber note. I wish we'd ended it on a laugh or smile." The actors who played The Lone Gunmen complimented the script. Harwood admitted that the episode would have either featured the trio's death or would have featured them "walk[ing] off into the sunset without hobo bags over our shoulders." Ultimately, he concluded, "I was glad we were killed off in the end". Dean Haglund said that he "liked the way we were sent off", and called the ending "cool".

== Reception ==
"Jump the Shark" first aired on the Fox network in the United States on April 21, 2002. The episode later aired in the United Kingdom on Sky One and later on BBC One on 23 February 2003. The episode earned a Nielsen household rating of 5.1, meaning that it was seen by 5.1% of the nation's estimated households and was viewed by 5.38 million households, (Note: At the time of airing, the estimated number of households was 105.5 million. Thus, 5.1 percent of 105.5 million is 5.38 million households.) and 8.6 million viewers. "Jump the Shark" was the 58th most watched episode of television that aired during the week ending April 21.

The episode received mixed to negative reviews from television critics. Aaron Kinney from Salon magazine said that the episode title showed that the creators at least still had a sense of humor, but that the episode demonstrated some of the flaws that caused the series to jump the shark in the first place: "cheesy melodrama, deathly slow pacing, and a lack of coherence". Robert Shearman and Lars Pearson, in their book Wanting to Believe: A Critical Guide to The X-Files, Millennium & The Lone Gunmen, rated the episode one star out of five, and noted that "there's nothing celebratory" about the entry. The two were highly critical of the episode's conclusion, calling it "such a bland way of dying that for a moment, you feel you must have missed the point". Shearman and Pearson, furthermore, argued that "The Lone Gunmen deserved better. No, worse than that—we deserved better." M.A. Crang, in his book Denying the Truth: Revisiting The X-Files after 9/11, criticized the "goofy tone" of the episode, saying it felt "very out of place" within the context of the series.

== Bibliography ==
- Fraga, Erica (2010). LAX-Files: Behind the Scenes with the Los Angeles Cast and Crew. CreateSpace. ISBN 9781451503418.
- Hurwitz, Matt; Knowles, Chris (2008). The Complete X-Files. Insight Editions. ISBN 978-1933784809.
- Shearman, Robert; Pearson, Lars (2009). Wanting to Believe: A Critical Guide to The X-Files, Millennium & The Lone Gunmen. Mad Norwegian Press. ISBN 978-0975944691.
- Crang, M.A. (2015). Denying the Truth: Revisiting The X-Files after 9/11. Createspace. ISBN 9781517009038.
