= Black Oil =

Black Oil may refer to:

- black oil, an alien virus in the X-Files
- a sunflower variety
- 19th century Australian term for oil from the Right Whale

== See also ==
- Fuel oil
- Petroleum
