= Trust No 1 =

- The X-Files episode
- Episode no.: Season 9 Episode 6
- Directed by: Tony Wharmby
- Written by: Chris Carter; Frank Spotnitz
- Production code: 9ABX08
- Original air date: January 6, 2002
- Running time: 44 minutes

Guest appearances
- Terry O'Quinn as Shadow Man; Allison Smith as Patti; Steven Flynn as Man on the Street; Kathryn Joosten as Agent Edie Boal; Fitz Houston as Station Manager; Brianne Prather as Young Woman; James Riker as Baby William; Travis Riker as Baby William

Episode chronology
← Previous "Lord of the Flies"	Next → "John Doe"
- The X-Files season 9

"Trust No 1" is the sixth episode of the ninth season of the American science fiction television series The X-Files. It premiered on the Fox network on January 6, 2002. The episode was written by series creator Chris Carter and executive producer Frank Spotnitz, and directed by Tony Wharmby. "Trust No 1" helps to explore the series' overarching mythology. The episode received a Nielsen household rating of 5.1 and was viewed by 8.4 million viewers; it garnered mixed to negative reviews from television critics, with many feeling that it portrayed the series' characters in a way that was unfaithful to the show's history.

The show centers on FBI special agents who work on cases linked to the paranormal, called X-Files; this season focuses on the investigations of John Doggett (Robert Patrick), Monica Reyes (Annabeth Gish), and Dana Scully (Gillian Anderson). In this episode, Scully is hopeful about reuniting with her former partner, Fox Mulder (David Duchovny) when a complete stranger offers new information about what drove him into hiding. Yet her trust in the stranger may place Mulder in even more danger, for the man turns out to be a super soldier.

"Trust No 1" features former leading star Duchovny via the use of previously filmed footage. It was written in response to fans who felt that, during season eight, Mulder's abduction was not dealt with until his miraculous return in "This is Not Happening"/"Deadalive". Actor Terry O'Quinn, who appears in this episode as the Shadow Man, had appeared as different characters in the second season episode "Aubrey" and the 1998 feature film and appeared as Peter Watts in The X-Files sister show Millennium. The tagline for the episode is "They're Watching."

== Plot ==
Dana Scully (Gillian Anderson) is at a coffee shop, where she replies to an email from Fox Mulder. Later, she is visited by John Doggett (Robert Patrick) and Monica Reyes (Annabeth Gish), who inform her that they have a tipster who claims to have vital information about the Super Soldiers, but he will only talk to Fox Mulder. Scully lies that she cannot contact Mulder, fearing for his safety.

Scully offers support to Patti, another young mother, who spends the night at her apartment. The following day Patti's husband attempts to break in, pursued by Doggett and Reyes. He reveals that he works for the NSA and has discovered the Super Soldier project and wants to expose it to Mulder. He says that their daughter is also a special child like William and that they are trying to protect them. Scully is then phoned by the NSA agent's boss, the Shadow Man (Terry O'Quinn), who provides her with instructions to meet him at a remote location. There, the Shadow Man confronts her, saying that he knows everything about her, including "that one lonely night you invited Mulder to your bed." He then tells Scully that he has information on the Super Soldier project, but he will only surrender it to Mulder.

Scully contacts Mulder to tell him to come back by train, hoping to get the information from the Shadow Man. Doggett warns her that it might be a trap, but Scully is determined to see Mulder again. They go to the train station with Reyes and the NSA agent, but the Shadow Man shows up and kills the agent. He then tries to shoot Scully, but Doggett saves her by shooting the Shadow Man, who falls under the train and disappears, confirming to Doggett that he is a Super Soldier. Due to the shootings the train passes by without stopping, and the agents learn that someone jumped off it near a rock quarry. They travel there to search for Mulder, and Doggett and Reyes see a figure fleeing in the distance. Scully encounters the Shadow Man, but he is suddenly destroyed by the magnetite in the quarry. Scully continues to email Mulder, but no longer expects him to reply.

== Production ==
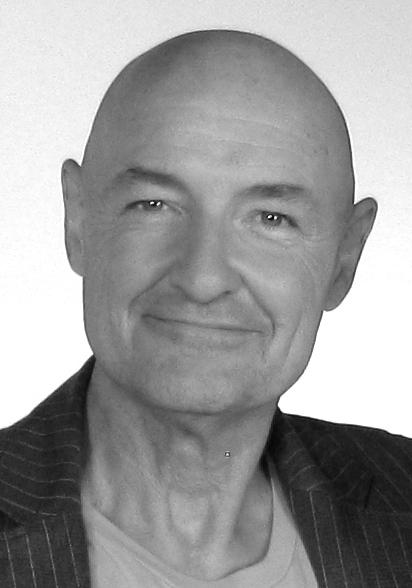
Terry O'Quinn guest starred in the episode.

"Trust No 1" was written by series creator Chris Carter along with executive producer Frank Spotnitz; it was directed by Tony Wharmby. The episode features former leading star David Duchovny via the use of previously shot footage. According to Matt Hurwitz and Chris Knowles in their book The Complete X-Files, the episode includes themes "about Orwellian surveillance." "Trust No 1" was written in response to fans who felt that, during season eight, Mulder's abduction was not dealt with until his miraculous return in "This is Not Happening"/"DeadAlive". Despite this, series director Kim Manners was critical of this take on Mulder, noting, "The only thing I thought we didn't do right during seasons eight and nine was that a lot of the shows were about Mulder, and I thought it was a mistake to make a series about a man that wasn't standing in front of the camera."

The email addresses that Mulder and Scully use to communicate with each other were real addresses, created and maintained by Ten Thirteen Productions. The tagline for the episode is "They're Watching", changed from the usual "The Truth is Out There".

Actor Terry O'Quinn, who appears in this episode as the Shadow Man, had appeared as different characters in the second season episode "Aubrey" and the 1998 feature film. He had also played a recurring role as Peter Watts on Millennium and appeared in the short-lived series Harsh Realm. O'Quinn later earned the nickname "Mr. Ten Thirteen", due to his appearance in multiple shows and movies affiliated with Ten Thirteen Productions, the company that produced The X-Files.

== Broadcast and reception ==
"Trust No 1" first premiered on the Fox network in the United States on January 6, 2002. The episode earned a Nielsen household rating of 5.1, meaning that it was seen by 5.1% of the nation's estimated households and was viewed by 5.4 million households, (Note: At the time of airing, the estimated number of households was 105.5 million. Thus, 5.1 percent of 105.5 million is 5.4 million households.) and 8.4 million viewers. It was the 55th most watched episode of television that aired during the week ending March 3. The episode eventually aired in the United Kingdom on BBC Two on December 8, 2002. The episode was later included on The X-Files Mythology, Volume 4 – Super Soldiers, a DVD collection that contains episodes involved with the alien super soldiers arc.

The episode received mixed to negative reviews from television critics. Jessica Morgan from Television Without Pity gave the episode a B− grade. Robert Shearman and Lars Pearson, in their book Wanting to Believe: A Critical Guide to The X-Files, Millennium & The Lone Gunmen, rated the episode one star out of five. The two called the entry "an exercise in futility […] at best" and argued that, because Duchovny had left the series, the sense of excitement that he might have made an appearance in the episode was completely gone. Furthermore, Shearman and Pearson heavily criticized Mulder and Scully's characterization, calling Mulder a character the audience "can't recognize any more" and Scully a "gullible patsy". M.A. Crang, in his book Denying the Truth: Revisiting The X-Files after 9/11, was also critical of the script's treatment of the characters, arguing that Mulder and Scully in this episode "sound nothing like the characters we have come to know". He also lamented that the episode did not examine the central theme of electronic surveillance in greater detail. Tom Kessenich, in his book Examinations, wrote a largely negative review of the episode. He derided the series for making it appear that Mulder abandoned the woman he loved and his own child. He noted, "Just because it walks, talks, and sometimes acts like The X-Files, doesn't make it The X-Files."

== Bibliography ==
- Hurwitz, Matt; Knowles, Chris (2008). The Complete X-Files. Insight Editions. ISBN 978-1933784809.
- Kessenich, Tom (2002). Examination: An Unauthorized Look at Seasons 6–9 of the X-Files. Trafford Publishing. ISBN 1553698126.
- Shearman, Robert; Pearson, Lars (2009). Wanting to Believe: A Critical Guide to The X-Files, Millennium & The Lone Gunmen. Mad Norwegian Press. ISBN 978-0975944691.

This article incorporates material derived from the "Trust No 1" article on the X-Files wiki at Fandom (formerly Wikia) and is licensed under the Creative Commons Attribution-Share Alike 3.0 License (July 14, 2012).
