= Improbable (The X-Files) =

- The X-Files episode
- Burt's smiling face merged with a high city view.
- Episode no.: Season 9 Episode 13
- Directed by: Chris Carter
- Written by: Chris Carter
- Production code: 9ABX14
- Original air date: April 7, 2002
- Running time: 44 minutes

Guest appearances
- Travis Riker as Baby William; Burt Reynolds as Burt/God; Ellen Greene as Vicki Burdick; John Kapelos as Fordyce; Ray McKinnon as Mad Wayne; Tighe Barry as Homeless Man; Shannon Maureen Brown as Pretty Blonde; Amy D'Allessandro as Amy; Nick De Marinis as Pizza Man; Ernesto Gasco as Heavy Italian Man; Benito Prezia as Old Italian Man; Cara Tripicchio as Italian Girl; Christine Trippichio as Italian Girl; Sandra Tripicchio as Italian Girl; Larry Udy as Middle-Aged Man; Angelo Vacco as Bartender; Angelo Vacco as Guido; Beth Watson as Woman

Episode chronology
← Previous "Underneath"	Next → "Scary Monsters"
- The X-Files season 9

"Improbable" is the thirteenth episode of the ninth season and the 195th episode overall of the science fiction television series The X-Files. The episode first aired in the United States and Canada on April 7, 2002, on Fox, and subsequently aired in the United Kingdom. It was written and directed by series creator and executive producer Chris Carter. The episode is a "monster-of-the-week" episode, a stand-alone plot which is unconnected to the mythology, or overarching fictional history, of The X-Files. The episode earned a Nielsen rating of 5.1 and was viewed by 9.1 million viewers. The episode received mostly positive reviews from critics.

The show centers on FBI special agents who work on cases linked to the paranormal, called X-Files; this season focuses on the investigations of John Doggett (Robert Patrick), Monica Reyes (Annabeth Gish), and Dana Scully (Gillian Anderson). In this episode, Reyes and her fellow agents investigate a serial killer who uses numerology to choose his victims. Soon, Reyes and Scully meet an unusual man who may prove more of a hindrance than a help.

"Improbable" features Burt Reynolds playing God. Reynolds was chosen after he expressed his desire to appear in an episode of The X-Files to Robert Patrick. Carter approved the idea, and Patrick later said that Reynolds enjoyed filming the episode. "Improbable" contains several elaborate effects, such as a cityscape rendered to look like Reynolds' head. Furthermore, the episode contains themes pertaining to fate, free will, and numerology. The tagline for this episode is "Dio Ti Ama", meaning "God loves you" in Italian, replacing the usual phrase "The Truth is Out There."

== Plot ==
At a casino bar, an unpleasant man known as "Wayno" (Ray McKinnon) meets a mysterious man (Burt Reynolds) who seems to know a lot about him. The mysterious man speaks in an enigmatic way, but his words do not seem to make any difference to Wayno, who murders a woman in a casino restroom shortly after the mysterious man tells him to "surprise him" by leaving the casino rather than following the woman into the restroom.

Agent Monica Reyes (Annabeth Gish) is investigating the woman's murder as the latest in a series of cases that she believes are linked by numerology. She realizes that when she adds the numbers of letters in the victims' names with the numbers in their birthdates, a pattern arises. While explaining the case to Dana Scully (Gillian Anderson), who rejects the idea that numerology is relevant or that the world can be broken down into one simple equation, Scully discovers another possible clue—marks on each of the victim's cheeks that looks like three small circles, likely imprinted by the killer's ring while he beat the victims. On consulting a numerologist, who happens to have an office in the same building as the killer's apartment, Reyes ties the murders together. However, the killer also finds the numerologist, murdering her as she is on the phone with Reyes.

Reyes' numerology theories do not go down well at the FBI, but the pattern of the killings, when viewed on a map, seem to line up as the number six (6). After looking at the pictures of the victims, Scully realizes that the pattern on the victims was not three circles, but instead, three sixes, the mark of the devil. Meanwhile, Wayno has several additional run-ins with the mysterious man, who continues to give cryptic advice.

Scully and Reyes revisit the murdered numerologist's office and meet the killer in the elevator. Scully recognizes the ring on the killer's hand as the agents exit the elevator, and draws her gun on him. The killer slips back into the elevator and gets to the parking lot first. Reyes and Scully arrive only to see a car fleeing the garage and the gate closing behind it. Scully and Reyes are locked in the garage without a way out and their phones are without service.

They see another person hiding in a car and demand that he come out. It is the strange man. He says he is meeting a friend to play checkers, but does not know when his friend is coming. He does not have any identification and does not have a phone. The pair demand that he open his trunk. Inside are many CDs—the man proclaims his love of music—and a checker board. To pass the time, the mysterious man engages Reyes and Scully in a game of checkers. They play several rounds. Reyes eventually realizes that the checkers' colors (red & black) are surrogates for Scully (a redhead) and herself (a brunette); The pair realize that the last victim, the numerologist (victim number 7) was a blonde, and that the murderer has been following a pattern of killing a blonde, then a redhead, then a brunette. Thus, a redhead and a brunette are the anticipated hair-colors of the next two victims. Scully and Reyes also realize that, although they assumed that the car that exited the garage was the killer, it was possible that the killer might still be inside the garage with them. Scully and Reyes begin searching, but are surprised by the killer, who shuts off the lights, grabs Reyes and eventually gets hold of her gun. However, John Doggett (Robert Patrick), also realizing that the number "6" pattern is actually a "9" and that the killer must intend to have two more victims, arrives in the nick of time to shoot him. Reyes attempts to ask the killer why he did what he did. The killer begins to mouth a word, but dies before being able to speak to Reyes. Scully and Reyes then realize that the mysterious man is no longer in the garage.

At the end of the episode, Scully and Reyes are getting ready for bed. Scully suddenly calls Reyes and asks her what her assigned numerology "number" is. Reyes informs Scully she is a "9" which means she has risen above the other numbers and understands that there is more to life than this world. The clock shows us that it is 9:09 pm. In a nearby Italian neighborhood, an Italian festival is in progress. Two men sing a comical and upbeat song (Io Mammeta E Tu) in Corsican and lead a crowd through the streets. The camera zooms out to reveal that the entire neighborhood, when viewed from above, suggests the appearance of Burt's face, hinting at the fact that he might be God.

== Production ==
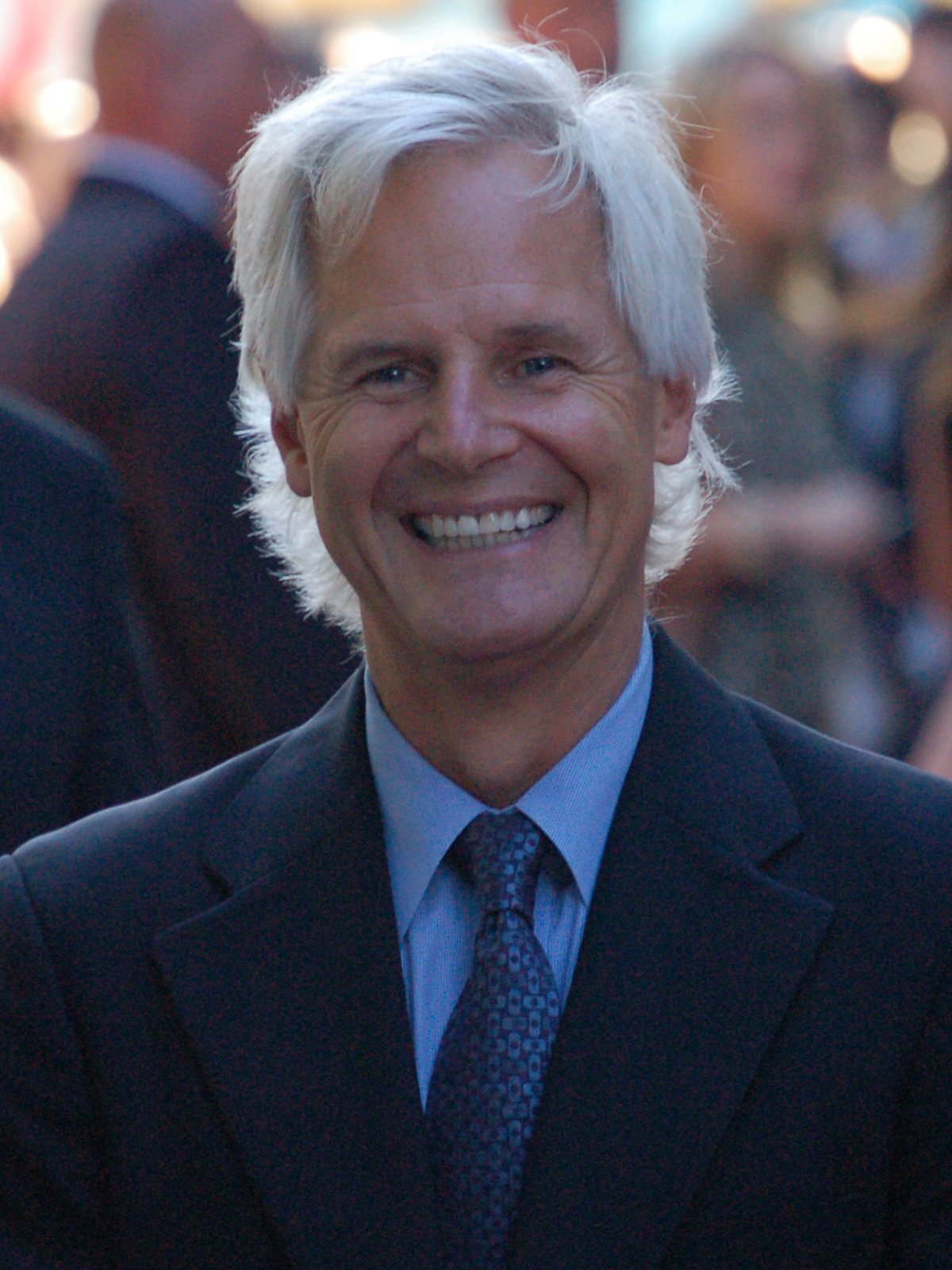
The episode was written and directed by Chris Carter.

=== Development ===
Carter later explained that humorous episodes were important to the show, especially during the "pitch-black" ninth season. He reasoned "there are the downbeats, and then you need the relief in the tension." The use of numbers in this episode helped emphasize the idea "that numerology is an important part of our life and plays a part, but it really ... illustrate[s] the idea of patterns, patterns of behavior, of the ways in which numbers rule both the universe and our lives and our ability to solve things, [and] to solve our mysteries of life". The tagline for this episode is "Dio Ti Ama", meaning "God loves you" in Italian, replacing the usual phrase "The Truth is Out There." The normal line "Executive Producer: Chris Carter" is also rendered in Italian, reading, "Produttore Esecutivo: Chris Carter".

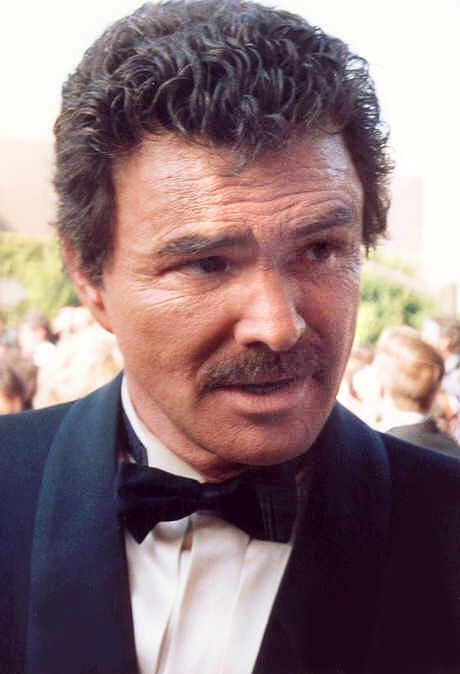
The episode guest starred Burt Reynolds as God.

The name Vicki Burdick came from a high school student Chris Carter knew. Carter felt that he needed to kill the character "all out of fondness." Before casting Ellen Greene, Carter had first spotted her in the musical, Little Shop of Horrors both in "New York and Los Angeles." The first scene shot for Greene's character took a "long day". Carter called her a "trouper" and said she was open to the direction he gave her. The set for that scene was created by Tim Stepeck, the show's set decorator during its ninth season. Annabeth Gish later revealed that her lines were difficult to remember. She explained, "I remember learning my lines and thinking, 'Oh my God. I've got to memorize this. It's scary. Like physics united theory, all of that."

=== Casting ===
Burt Reynolds was chosen for "Improbable" after he expressed his desire to appear in an episode of The X-Files to Robert Patrick. Carter approved the idea and told Patrick that he would "write something good". He later noted that "as a young man, [Reynolds] meant something to me" and that the chance to act alongside him was "surreal". After Carter had written the script, he presented it to Reynolds for his approval; Reynolds approved of the script and agreed to be in the episode. Robert Patrick later noted that Reynolds "had a great time, and he loved working with everybody."

=== Effects and music ===
The final scene, featuring Burt's face superimposed onto the cityscape, was created by special effects supervisor Mat Beck. The only actual footage in the scene is a pull-back shot of the carnival that was filmed with the use of a crane. A CGI cityscape was then created that resembled Burt Reynolds' head. The two shots were composited together, and a blur effect was added to "[make] it sell". An alternate version of the scene was created that featured Chris Carter's head instead of Reynolds'. This version was included as a bonus feature on the season nine DVD set. The score for the episode, like the rest of the series, was composed by Mark Snow. Snow based much of the music in the episode on records made by Karl Zéro, on the request of Carter. Carter later noted that "I had heard his music and it was so far out and it fit with exactly what I wanted to do because I wanted to recreate [the yearly celebration in] Little Italy. [...] I wanted to create that festival."

== Themes ==
According to Chris Carter, the whole idea behind the episode was about numbers and that the "significance of numbers in our lives starts here on the card table where the players are being dealt a hand each." He continued with "the idea is that we're all dealt hands, genetic hands, and maybe even numerological hands that give us basically the tools with which we deal and/or use for our lives." He further stated that the idea was that it was "free will" and "fate", continued with that fate was determined by our own genetics.

The villain in the story, Mad Wayne, had been dealt a bad hand in life. Because of his situation, he "acts on his bad impulses"; Carter elaborated, "Is it fate that Wayne is about, the character, this is what I was interested in exploring here. As we'll see with the introduction in a moment of a character who throws all of this into question – God – we're going to see what his place is in all of this, or at least explore what Burt Reynolds, playing God here, has to do with the character Wayne." The main idea behind the episode, was that "God knows all the numbers [because] they're his numbers" and he is laying them down and is in "charge of the big game". God in this episode is thus "trying to show [the characters] the game" of life that is to be "won or lost". By making the wrong decisions, Wayne, by the end of the episode, has lost this game.

== Reception ==
=== Ratings ===
"Improbable" first aired in the United States on April 7, 2002. The episode earned a Nielsen household rating of 5.1, meaning that it was seen by an estimated 5.1% of the nation's households. The episode was viewed by 5.38 million households (Note: At the time of airing, the estimated number of households was 105.5 million. Thus, 5.1 percent of 105.5 million is 5.38 million households.) and 9.1 million viewers "Improbable" was the 57th most watched episode of television that aired during the week ending April 14.

=== Reviews ===
"Improbable" received mostly positive reviews from critics. Jessica Morgan of Television Without Pity awarded the episode a "B+". Robert Shearman and Lars Pearson, in their book Wanting to Believe: A Critical Guide to The X-Files, Millennium & The Lone Gunmen, rated the episode four stars out of five, and called the script "very witty". The two wrote that "the brilliance of Chris Carter's direction" allowed the viewer of the episode to see it "from God's point of view". Shearman and Pearson concluded that the episode "is not as smart as it thinks it is. But it's still pretty smart." M.A. Crang, in his book Denying the Truth: Revisiting The X-Files after 9/11, called the episode "bizarre yet amusing" and said that the central numerology story "doesn't feel like it's enough to sustain an entire episode".

UGO named God/Mr. Burt as one of the "Top 11 X-Files Monsters", noting that "as [series creator Chris Carter] imagines him, [God] is a benevolent deity, constantly prodding his creatures to look at the patterns before them, to see the overall plan that he's laid out. He's doomed to failure, and he knows it, though it doesn't stop him from trying".

== Bibliography ==
- Fraga, Erica (2010). LAX-Files: Behind the Scenes with the Los Angeles Cast and Crew. CreateSpace. ISBN 9781451503418.
- Hurwitz, Matt; Knowles, Chris (2008). The Complete X-Files. Insight Editions. ISBN 978-1933784809.
- Shearman, Robert; Pearson, Lars (2009). Wanting to Believe: A Critical Guide to The X-Files, Millennium & The Lone Gunmen. Mad Norwegian Press. ISBN 978-0975944691.
- Crang, M.A. (2015). Denying the Truth: Revisiting The X-Files after 9/11. Createspace. ISBN 9781517009038.
