= Lord of the Flies (The X-Files) =

- The X-Files episode
- Dylan Lokensgard covered with flies
- Episode no.: Season 9 Episode 5
- Directed by: Kim Manners
- Written by: Thomas Schnauz
- Production code: 9ABX06
- Original air date: December 16, 2001
- Running time: 44 minutes

Guest appearances
- Aaron Paul as David "Winky" Winkle; Aeryk Egan as Camera Dude; Branden Williams as Cap'n Dare; Erick Avari as Dr. Herb Fountain; Hank Harris as Dylan Lokensgard; Jane Lynch as Anne Lokensgard; Michael Wiseman as Dr. Rocky Bronzino; Samaire Armstrong as Natalie Gordon

Episode chronology
← Previous "4-D"	Next → "Trust No 1"
- The X-Files season 9

"Lord of the Flies" is the fifth episode of the ninth season of the science fiction television series The X-Files, and the show's 187th episode overall. It first premiered on the Fox network in the United States on December 16, 2001, and was subsequently aired in the United Kingdom on BBC Two. The episode was written by Thomas Schnauz, and was directed by Kim Manners. The episode is a "monster-of-the-week" episode, a stand-alone plot which is unconnected to the mythology, or overarching fictional history, of The X-Files. "Lord of the Flies" earned a Nielsen household rating of 6.2, and was watched by 9.9 million viewers. The episode received mixed reviews from television critics, with many critical of the episode's reliance on humor.

The show centers on FBI special agents who work on cases linked to the paranormal, called X-Files; this season focuses on the investigations of John Doggett (Robert Patrick), Monica Reyes (Annabeth Gish), and Dana Scully (Gillian Anderson). In this episode, an amateur stunt performer is killed while performing a daring act for a local cable reality show. Scully, Doggett and Reyes discover that the culprit was apparently a swarm of killer flies hidden in the victim's brain.

"Lord of the Flies" marked a return of comedic episodes to the series. Due to this, Patrick had issues with his acting because, initially, he felt the entry was too foolish. The aggressiveness of flies in the episode was inspired by the actual habits of Australian blow flies.

== Plot ==
A group of teenagers, led by "Sky Commander Winky" (Aaron Paul), film one of their friends, nicknamed "Cap'n Dare" (played by Branden Williams), doing stunts for a cable TV show called Dumbass. The last stunt involves a ramp-jump in a shopping cart. During the stunt, Dare veers off and falls out of the cart and is found dead after part of his skull collapses. The local coroner calls in John Doggett (Robert Patrick) and Monica Reyes (Annabeth Gish) to investigate the death. During the autopsy, flies erupt from Dare's eye sockets. Dana Scully (Gillian Anderson) examines the body and finds that the insects had fed on Dare's brain to such a degree that it simply collapsed.

At a local high school, Winky and his brother film a memorial service for Dare, much to the annoyance of his girlfriend Natalie. The teens harass Dylan Lokensgard, the son of the principal and a social outcast. Doggett and Reyes arrive at the school to talk to Winky. During their interview, body lice mysteriously attack him and bite "Dumbass" into his flesh. While watching the Dumbass recordings, Doggett notices that Dylan was at each of the stunts and decides to question him. While the two agents talk to Dylan, his mother appears and tries to stop the questioning. During the proceedings, Dylan becomes covered in flies; subsequently, Reyes starts to believe that Dylan is behind the attack. The agents take a tissue soaked with Dylan's sweat back for Scully to analyze. The results show that Dylan's body fluids contain a high number of insect pheromones.

That night, Natalie sneaks into Dylan's house. When they kiss, something apparently cuts her mouth, causing her to leave in tears. Dare's friends, who believe Dylan is responsible for his death, pull up moments later and abduct him. During the drive, an insect-like protrusion comes out of Dylan's mouth and sprays webbing everywhere, causing the car to flip and crash. Doggett and Reyes arrive at the scene, and are told that Dylan chewed his way out the back window. Meanwhile, Scully and a bug specialist search Dylan's home. Scully leaves to help Reyes find the teenager while the specialist stays behind; the specialist is subsequently attacked by Dylan's mother.

After tracking down Natalie, Reyes is attacked and cocooned by Dylan. She is rescued by Doggett. Dylan's mother approaches him as he attempts to flee with Natalie. She tells him that he is not like other kids and never will be. Scully finds the bug specialist, cocooned but alive, though Dylan and his mother are nowhere to be found. A subsequent search of the Lokensgard home reveals other bodies, including Dylan's father, who supposedly ran off years earlier. After leaving with his mother, Dylan sends Natalie one last message in the form of fireflies: "I love you."

== Production ==
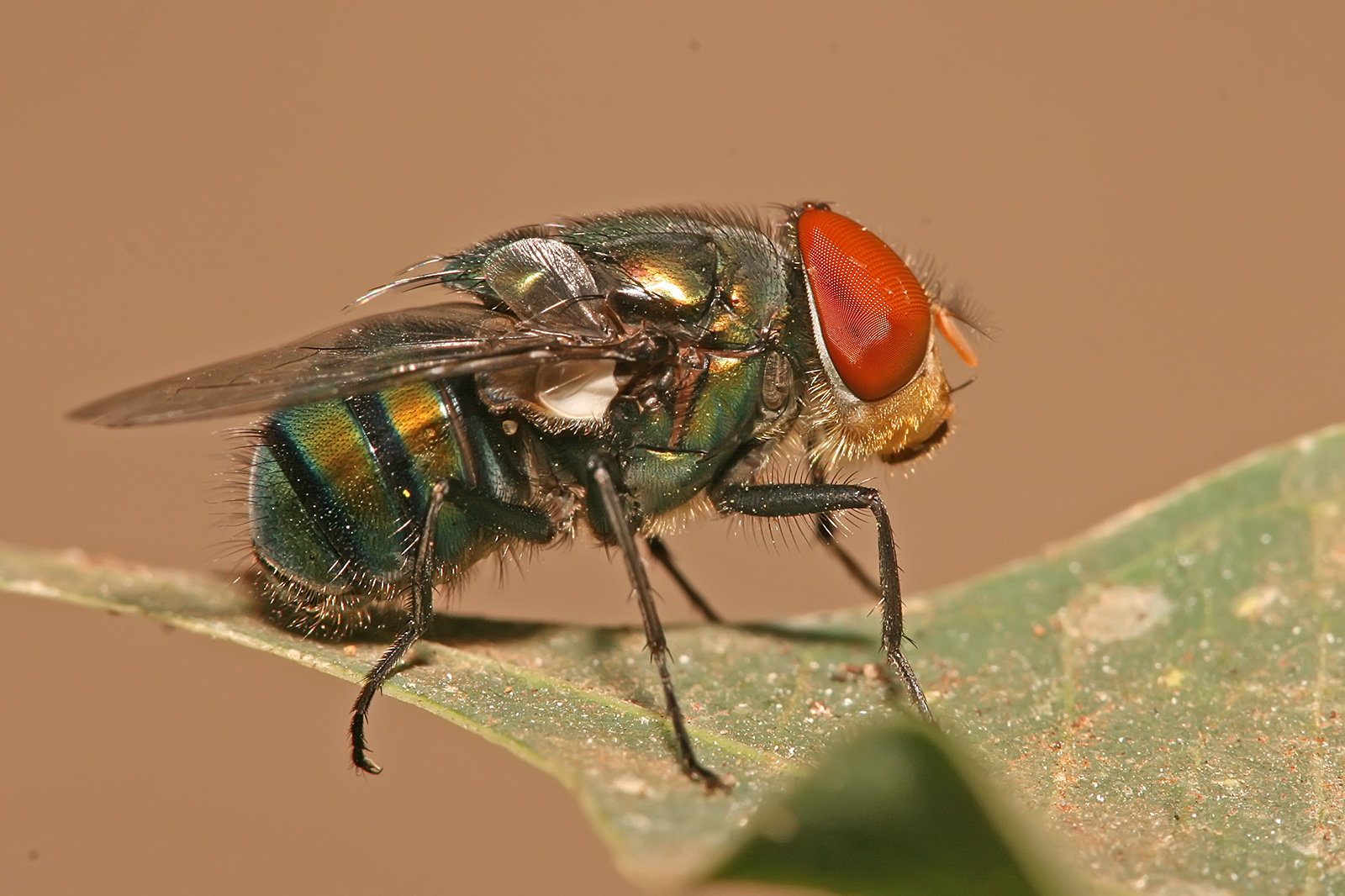
The aggressiveness of flies in the episode was inspired by the actual habits of Australian blow flies.

The episode was written by Thomas Schnauz, and was directed by Kim Manners. It was Schnauz's first writing credit, and Manner's second directing credit for the season. The episode, whose title is an English translation of the semitic demon Beelzebub's name, marked a return of "the comedy episode" for the series. According to Matt Hurwitz and Chris Knowles in their book The Complete X-Files, the episode "revisit[s] [the] themes of genetic grafting experiments from 'Travelers' in a humorous context." Series co-star Robert Patrick had a difficult time with the episode; he later explained, "I couldn't deal with some of the material. As an actor, I found some of it to be a little silly." Accordingly, Manners helped Patrick traverse the script, helping him achieve the desired delivery for his lines.

The aggressiveness of flies in the episode was inspired by the actual habits of Australian blow flies. A few of the flies on the dead body of "Cap'n Dare" were real, but the rest were created via CGI, according to special effects supervisors John Wash. Conversely, when filming the scene where Dylan is covered in flies, Hank Harris wore a suit that was covered with 30,000 live flies. The opening for the episode was filmed at Cheviot Hills Park in Los Angeles. The site had previously been used for various shots in the sixth season episode "The Unnatural" and the eighth season episode "Three Words". Garfield High School in Sherman Oaks, California, stood in for Grant High School.

The episode makes several references to British singer-songwriter Syd Barrett, with whom the character of Dylan strongly identifies. Barrett was the original lead singer for the rock band Pink Floyd before his departure in 1968. Two songs from Barrett's 1970 solo album The Madcap Laughs, "No Good Trying" and "Terrapin", are featured in the episode.

== Broadcast and reception ==
"Lord of the Flies" first premiered on the Fox network in the United States on December 16, 2001. "Lord of the Flies" earned a Nielsen household rating of 6.2, meaning that it was seen by 6.2% of the nation's estimated households and was viewed by 6.54 million households, (Note: At the time of airing, the estimated number of households was 105.5 million. Thus, 6.2 percent of 105.5 million is 6.54 million households.) and 9.9 million viewers. "Lord of the Flies" was the 51st most watched episode of television that aired during the week ending December 16. The episode eventually aired on BBC Two in the United Kingdom on December 1, 2002.

The episode received mixed reviews from television critics. Jessica Morgan of Television Without Pity gave the episode a "C" grade rating. She derided the Fox network's decision to place The X-Files logo over the pre-titles teaser, but ultimately concluded that the episode was a "decent [one] to recap". Robert Shearman and Lars Pearson, in their book Wanting to Believe: A Critical Guide to The X-Files, Millennium & The Lone Gunmen, rated the episode one-and-a-half stars out of five. The two argued that the entry was trying to "be a 'Rain King' or a 'Terms of Endearment' and would like to recapture the sweet and charming feel of those early Season Six experiments." However, they noted that because the show was in a different stage—Mulder and Scully were no longer the focus of the show's attention—that "the same style falls flat on its face". Furthermore, Shearman and Pearson complained that "The X-Files is draining the trough of teenage angst again". M.A. Crang, in his book Denying the Truth: Revisiting The X-Files after 9/11, felt that the teaser "intrigues for a moment", but that the competing elements of "quirky humour, body horror and teen love story quickly sink this disappointing outing."

== Bibliography ==
- Fraga, Erica (2010). LAX-Files: Behind the Scenes with the Los Angeles Cast and Crew. CreateSpace. ISBN 9781451503418.
- Hurwitz, Matt; Knowles, Chris (2008). The Complete X-Files. Insight Editions. ISBN 978-1933784809.
- Shearman, Robert; Pearson, Lars (2009). Wanting to Believe: A Critical Guide to The X-Files, Millennium & The Lone Gunmen. Mad Norwegian Press. ISBN 978-0975944691.

This article incorporates material derived from the "Lord of the Flies" article on the X-Files wiki at Fandom (formerly Wikia) and is licensed under the Creative Commons Attribution-Share Alike 3.0 License (June 27, 2012).
