= Chris Owens (actor) =

Canadian actor (born 1961)

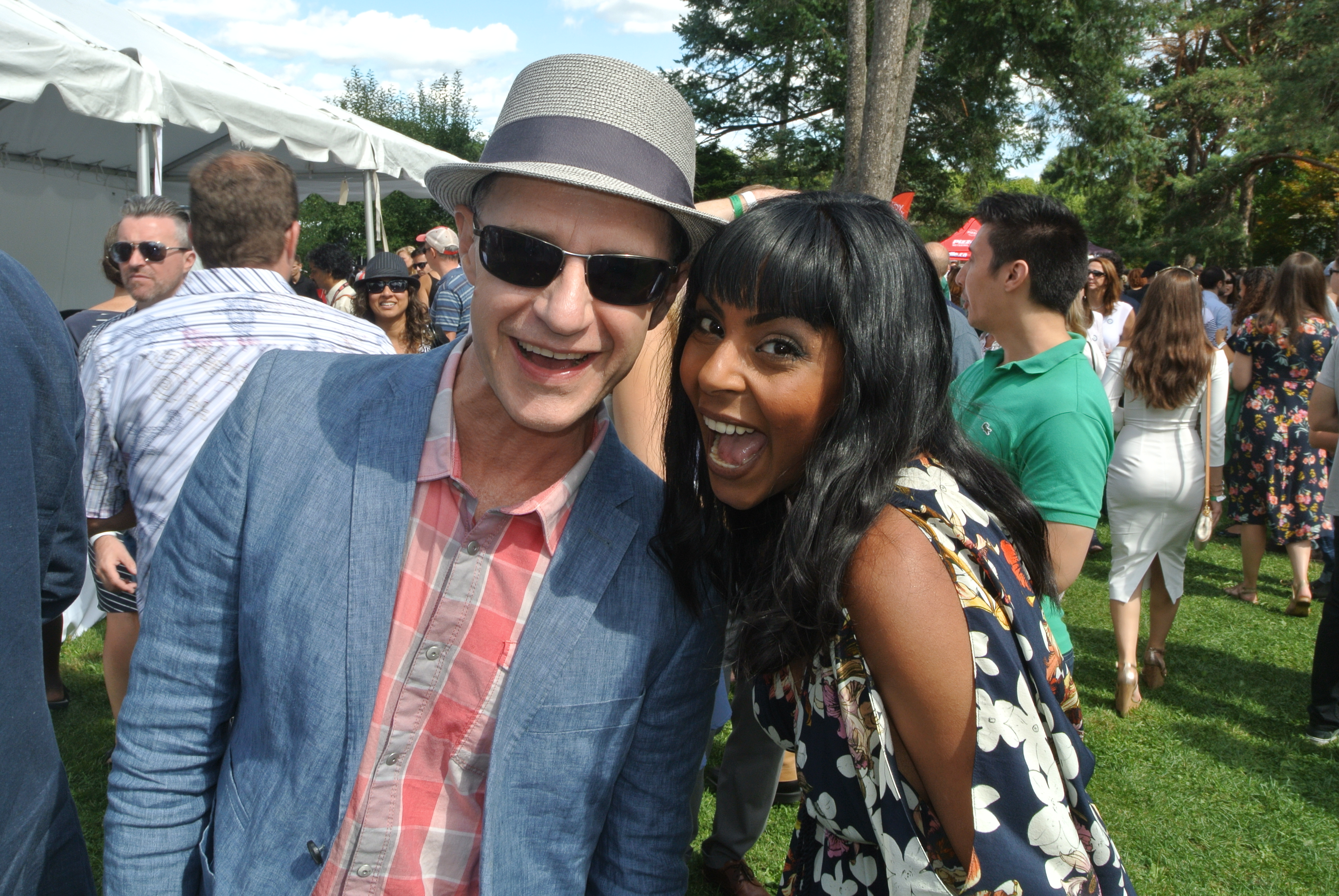
- Owens (left) with actress Farah Merani at 2016 CFC Annual BBQ Fundraiser
- Born: Christopher Bradley Owens; 7 September 1961 (age 64); Toronto, Ontario, Canada
- Occupation: Actor
- Years active: 1983–present

Christopher Bradley Owens (born 7 September 1961) is a Canadian actor. He is best known for his performances on the television series The X-Files.

== Early life ==
Owens was born in Toronto, Ontario, the son of Jeannette, a jazz singer, and Garry Owens, a jazz drummer.

== Career ==
Owens has performed in many feature films, often in minor roles, including appearances in Cocktail and The Recruit. However, he is best known for his performances on the television series The X-Files. Owens initially guest starred as the younger version of William B. Davis's character, the Cigarette Smoking Man, in a 1996 episode "Musings of a Cigarette Smoking Man". He returned in 1997 in the same role in an episode called "Demons". Later that year, he played the Frankenstein-esque Great Mutato in a surreal episode called "The Post-Modern Prometheus".

In 1998, Owens was cast as special agent Jeffrey Spender, son of The Smoking Man and alien abductee Cassandra Spender. Owens was credited as 'Also Starring' but only appeared in eight episodes, spread across the show's fifth and sixth seasons, before his character died at the hand of his father. Owens returned in a 2002 episode called "William", playing a hideously disfigured Jeffrey Spender who had survived the "murder". He appeared a few episodes later in "The Truth", the series finale. Owens appeared one final time as Jeffrey Spender, on January 3, 2018, in The X-Files Eleventh Season Premiere, "My Struggle III", in order to warn Agent Scully and also divulged the last name of her son’s adoptive parents.

He has been nominated for numerous awards, including a 2002 Genie Award for Best Performance by an Actor in a Leading Role for The Uncles.

== Filmography ==
=== Film ===
| Year | Title | Role | Notes |
|---|---|---|---|
| 1985 | Cages | Billy Simpson | Short film |
| 1987 | The Big Town | Garage Boy | |
| 1988 | Cocktail | Soldier | |
| 1990 | The Nutcracker Prince | Erik | Voice |
| 1996 | Sabotage | Young Security Guard | |
| 1998 | Disturbing Behavior | Officer Kramer | |
| 2000 | The Uncles | John | Nominated—Genie Award for Best Performance by an Actor in a Leading Role |
| 2003 | The Happy Couple | Dwayne | |
| 2003 | The Recruit | Art Wallis | |
| 2007 | Breach | Trunk Cataloguer | |
| 2008 | The Incredible Hulk | Commando | |
| 2008 | High School Musical 3: Senior Year | Dancer | |
| 2009 | Saw VI | Additional voices | |
| 2010 | Red | Hanged Man | |
| 2010 | Saw 3D: The Final Chapter | Additional voices | |
| 2011 | Dream House | Tom Barrion | Uncredited |
| 2017 | Molly's Game | LA Player | |
| 2024 | The Apprentice | Jay Pritzker | |

=== Television films ===
| Year | Title | Role |
|---|---|---|
| 1986 | As Is | Pickup #2 |
| 1986 | 9B | Steven Lapiere |
| 1987 | Haunted By Her Past | Thomas |
| 1996 | Double Jeopardy | Rocco |
| 1994 | Paris or Somewhere | Shawn |
| 1995 | Almost Golden: The Jessica Savitch Story | Nebraska |
| 1996 | Giant Mike | Tom Aitken |
| 1997 | Their Second Chance | Jeff Colvin |
| 2000 | Python | Brian Cooper |
| 2001 | A Glimpse of Hell | Agent Flynn |
| 2001 | My Louisiana Sky | Lonnie Parker |
| 2002 | Guilt by Association | Roger |
| 2002 | Power and Beauty | Weston |
| 2008 | Victor | Dave Stubbs |
| 2018 | Believe Me: The Abduction of Lisa McVey | Detective Wolf |

=== Television series ===
| Year | Title | Role | Notes |
|---|---|---|---|
| 1983 | Hangin' In | Brian | Episode: "Video Fever" |
| 1985 | Night Heat | Mel Braddock | Episode: "Ancient Madness" |
| 1986 | Adderly | Gang Member | Episode: "Rich Kid" |
| 1988 | 9B | Steven Lapiere | 5 episodes |
| 1988 | The Campbells | Volunteer Rifleman | Episode: "The Rifle Company" |
| 1989 | Street Legal | Ricky Palmer | Episode: "Slipping Through the Cracks" |
| 1990 | Top Cops | Astorotti | Episode: "James Garcia/Mike Coleman" |
| 1990 | Street Legal | Seth Cuthbert | Episode: "Standard of Care" |
| 1992 | Rin Tin Tin K-9 Cop | —N/a | Episode: "Under Siege" |
| 1993 | The Hidden Room | Peter Semple | Episode: "The First Battle" |
| 1995 | TekWar | Roy Henry | Episode: "Chill Factory" |
| 1996 | Kung Fu: The Legend Continues | Tremaine | Episode: "Shaolin Shot" |
| 1996 | PSI Factor | Deputy Carl Hall | Episode: "Reptilian Revenge/Ghostly Voices" |
| 1996–1997 | The X-Files | Young Cigarette Smoking Man | 2 episodes |
| 1997 | Millennium | Deputy Bill Sherman | Episode: "Monster" |
| 1997 | The X-Files | Mutato | Episode: "The Post-Modern Prometheus" |
| 1998 | Stargate SG-1 | Armin Selig | Episode: "Secrets" |
| 1998–2018 | The X-Files | Jeffrey Spender | 11 episodes Nominated—Screen Actors Guild Award for Outstanding Performance by an Ensemble in a Drama Series |
| 1999 | The Net | Sam Lloyd | Episode: "Y2K: Total System Failure" |
| 2001 | Blue Murder | Speltz | Episode: "Wrongful Convictions" |
| 2001 | Lexx | Biff | Episode: "Texx Lexx" |
| 2001 | Soul Food | Jim | Episode: "Fly Away Home" |
| 2002 | Mutant X | Mr. Delay | Episode: "Interface" |
| 2003 | Blue Murder | John Doe | Episode: "John Doe" |
| 2004 | This Is Wonderland | —N/a | Episode: "#1.9" |
| 2004 | The Grid | Polygrapher | Episode: "#1.2" |
| 2005 | 1-800-MISSING | —N/a | Episode: "Sisterhood" |
| 2005 | Air Crash Investigation | Scott Lustig | Episode: "Mistaken Identity" |
| 2007 | Til Death Do Us Part | Carl Lawford | Episode: "The Pond Scum Murder" |
| 2009 | The Line | Andy | 15 episodes |
| 2010 | Baxter | Sam | 4 episodes |
| 2011 | Combat Hospital | Sergeant Major Gaestner | Episode: "Shifting Sands" |
| 2015 | The Strain | Medical Officer | Episode: "Quick and Painless" |
| 2016 | 11.22.63 | Anesthesiologist | Episode: "Happy Birthday, Lee Harvey Oswald" |
| 2018 | The Expanse | Kolvoord | 6 episodes |
| 2020 | The Comey Rule | Man Behind Him | Episode: "Night One" |
| 2021 | Mayor of Kingstown | Tom | Episode: "Orion" |
| 2023 | Murdoch Mysteries | Bruce Marshall | Episode: "Cool Million" |
| 2023 | Fellow Travelers | Barker | 2 episodes |
| 2024 | The Madness | Levi | 2 episodes |
| 2026 | Reacher | Nolan Cahill | 3 episodes |
