= Colonist (The X-Files) =

- A Colonist "bounty hunter" revealing his true face as a grey-like alien.
- First appearance: "The Erlenmeyer Flask"
- Last appearance: "This Is Not Happening"
- Portrayed by: Various actors

In-universe information
- Affiliated with: Syndicate

The Colonists are an extraterrestrial species and are also the primary group of antagonists in the science fiction television show The X-Files as well as the first X-Files feature film. The mystery revolving around their identity and purpose is slowly revealed across the course of the series. In the series' plot, the Colonists are collaborating with a group of United States government officials known as the Syndicate in a plan to colonize the Earth, correlating to their name.

== Character arc ==
According to the series mythology, an extraterrestrial lifeform, known in the series' mythology simply as the Colonists, were originally present on Earth in the early stages of human evolution. They highly resemble the well-known "grey aliens" in their mature form. In their immature stage, they are more yellowish-colored, tall, and very aggressive, possessing fangs, claws and scale-like texture of their skin. This immature form is a protective stage, able to viciously defend itself from birth. This outer skin is eventually shed when the alien develops into its mature form. The immature form resembles that of a reptilian extraterrestrial and is referred to as the "long-clawed" form.

The aliens were forced to abandon the planet during the last ice age as their viral form is deactivated by extreme cold. Upon their departure, they left behind underground deposits of the black oil virus, in preparation for their return. The virus apparently contains the aliens' genetic blueprints, awaiting reconstitution when the master species returns to Earth. While away from Earth, the Colonists evidently sought out life throughout the universe in an effort to subdue other species and take over the universe. Purportedly, the Colonists planned on returning to Earth in the year 2012, as The Smoking Man (William B. Davis) later remarks to Fox Mulder (David Duchovny) that the ancient Mayans were so terrified that they stopped their calendar on the exact date of colonization: December 22, 2012. The Colonists eventually returned to Earth in 1947 when one of their ships crashed in New Mexico due to exposure to magnetite in the surrounding rocks. Shortly after this event, a select few power brokers, mainly in the United States and the Soviet Union (though some also came from other nations), first learned of the Colonist plot to retake the planet. These men eventually formed the Syndicate; they included the Well-Manicured Man (John Neville), The Smoking Man, and Bill Mulder (Peter Donat), among others.

The Syndicate threatened to use nuclear weapons to render the Earth uninhabitable to the Colonists due to extreme cold. As such, humanity was spared immediate invasion, and The Syndicate began negotiations with the Colonists. In 1973, an alliance was created and an agreement was reached that a small group of humans would be allowed by the Colonists to survive by becoming alien-human hybrids. The date for recolonization was firmly established in 2012 so that both sides could work on creating an alien-human hybrid before the arrival of the Colonist fleet. These hybrids, if successful, would serve as a slave race for the Colonists – the Syndicate and other chosen humans would receive the hybrid genes and be spared. In exchange for the Syndicate's cooperation, the Colonists handed over alien embryos as a source of genetic material for the hybrid experiments, as well as allowing limited military use of their technology and resources (such as the Alien Bounty Hunters), and promising that the heirs of the Syndicate members, who were turned over to the Colonists as an act of good faith, would survive the takeover. Meanwhile, both sides had a secret. The human conspirators would attempt to develop a vaccine for the alien virus in an effort to save all of humanity. The Colonists pretended that mass infection of humanity by the black oil would make them a controlled slave race, but in reality the oil would give birth to new alien beings within the human hosts resulting in re-population rather than colonization.

== Alien factions ==
=== Alien Bounty Hunters ===
==== Character arc ====
Alien Bounty Hunter
- First appearance: "Colony"
- Last appearance: "Without"
- Portrayed by: Brian Thompson; Various actors

In-universe information
- Affiliated with: Colonists

The Bounty Hunters are a distinct group from the Colonist aliens. Although all Colonist aliens are shape-shifters, the Alien Bounty Hunters readily take the shape of humans and are tasked with policing their plans and tracking down and eliminating any threats. The bounty hunters have green blood that contains a retrovirus which, when exposed to humans, is lethal. The alien blood can burn through most surfaces like an acid, and can kill a normal human if exposed for too long to its noxious fumes. In addition, the alien's blood causes human blood to coagulate into a jelly-like substance, but its effects can be neutralized by extreme cold. The Bounty Hunters, and any member of the Colonists' race, could also only be killed by piercing a small area at the base of the neck; the bounty hunters carried a kind of alien stiletto-like weapon to assassinate rogue aliens and to destroy imperfect alien-human hybrids. Once dead, their bodies would rapidly dissolve into a pool of their severely acidic blood, which would eventually evaporate.

Inconsistent with this arc, in season 8 episode 2 "Without" Scully kills the bounty hunter by shooting him with her gun. He oozes green blood, yet neither she, nor the other FBI agents who enter the room while the body is disintegrating, are affected by the green acid-like blood.

The Alien Rebels, those aliens that opposed the plans of the alien Colonists, are of the same species. The distinguishing characteristic of the Rebels is that they have had all of their facial orifices sealed shut in an effort to avoid absorption of and subsequent infection by the parasitic black oil; this led to a somewhat grotesque appearance. In the latter seasons of The X-Files, the role of the Bounty Hunters on Earth has largely been taken over by the Super Soldiers, human replacements capable of withstanding incredible amounts of damage.

==== Conceptual history ====
In the two-part episodes "Colony" and "End Game", Chris Carter and Frank Spotnitz along with some help from David Duchovny created what would become a recurring character named the Alien Bounty Hunter. According to Carter, Duchovny came to him and said "wouldn't it be great if we had like an alien bounty hunter?" Carter was positive towards the idea and acted upon it. The actor Brian Thompson auditioned for the role in a casting session, where he was competing with another actor. Spotnitz and Carter did not have much time to cast this character, but they knew this casting would be important since they intended the character to become a recurring character. Thompson was chosen according to Spotnitz because he had a very "distinctive look" about him, most notably his face and mouth. After casting him, they told Thompson's agent that he needed a hair cut, because he was originally envisioned as a U.S. Air Force pilot who'd been shot down. When Thompson came to Vancouver, British Columbia, Canada there had been some "misunderstanding" between them, and he had not been told of the hair cut. So the hairstyle seen in this and every episode since was a "compromise" between Thompson and the producers.

==== Reception ====
Critical reception to the Alien Bounty Hunters has been largely positive. Den of Geek also named the Alien Bounty Hunters among "The Top 10 X-Files Baddies". The review wrote positively of the Alien Bounty Hunters and described them as "the nasty minions of the colonists". The review wrote that their being written out of the series was a "shame". The site awarded the bounty hunters a "Coolness" rating of four out of five, an "Impact" rating of two out of five, and a "Creepiness" rating of two out of five.

=== Black oil ===
==== Character arc ====
Black Oil
- A black oil infectee as seen in "Vienen"
- First appearance: "Piper Maru"
- Last appearance: "Vienen"

In-universe information
- Affiliated with: Colonists; Syndicate

Purity, more commonly referred to as black oil, and called the "black cancer" by the Russians, is an alien virus that thrived underground on Earth, in petroleum deposits. The virus is capable of entering humanoids and assuming control of their bodies. It has sentience and is capable of communicating. It was revealed to be the "life force" of the alien colonists, which they seemingly used to reproduce their kind, as well as infect other alien races in order to conquer the universe.

The Syndicate in cooperation with the alien Colonists developed a delivery mechanism that would be used to introduce the virus into an unsuspecting public upon colonization. Africanized bees, extremely aggressive, that would sting indiscriminately, would carry the black oil virus through a transgenic corn crop specifically engineered to carry the virus and to attract the bees. The bees would be released on colonization and the infected human beings would become a slave race. The Syndicate, however, secretly tried to create a vaccine to protect themselves, which they code-named "Purity Control." While the Purity Control project ultimately fails, a rival Russian shadow group was successful in developing a weak vaccine that eventually fell into the hands of the Syndicate.

The plot to cooperate with the alien colonization plan was implemented with the aim of being given access to the black oil for the transgenic corn, in order to perform experiments with it in an effort to develop a vaccine. This attempt was semi-successful, as the "weak vaccine" administered to Scully while in the Antarctic alien ship was able to cure her infection and cause the entire ship to depart its underground residence. After the events of the 1998 film, the Syndicate, as well as Mulder and Scully, learned that the black oil can either take over a host's body or incubate within other life forms, including humans. Once infected with the gestational form of the black oil virus, a human host gestates the immature alien form after 96 hours, or sooner if the surrounding temperature is raised significantly, killing the host in the process.

==== Conceptual history ====
The third season episode "Piper Maru" marked the first occurrence of the black oil. The on-screen appearance of the substance was achieved through visual effects, with the shimmering oil effect being digitally placed over the actors' corneas in post-production. The crew went through various iterations to find the two "right" types of fluids. According to physical effects crewman David Gauthier, they used a mix of oil and acetone, which he believed gave the substance a more globular look. Special effects technician Mat Beck was able to digitally bend the oil effect around the shape of the actors' eyes.

The season eight episode, "Vienen", marked the last appearance of the black oil in the series. Molasses and chocolate syrup were used for the visual effects of the black oil. The scene with the black oil coming out of the eyes, ears and mouth was mostly done on a visual effects stage. Due to the uncontrollable nature of the substance, it took nine takes to get the syrup to spill on the right places.

==== Reception ====
Critical reception to the black oil has been largely positive. Den of Geek named the black oil and the killer bees among "The Top 10 X-Files Baddies". The review applauded the black oil's creepy nature and noted that the black oil was "central part of the larger Colonisation Plan that underpins the big story arc of the series". They awarded it a "Coolness" rating of four out of five, an "Impact" rating of three out of five, and a "Creepiness" rating of four out of five. Furthermore, Den of Geek wrote positively of the Killer Bees and wrote that "you gotta love" them. The review stated that they were "in the pantheon of 'cool shit to do in movies'" and that their presence added to the overall effect of the first movie. The site awarded the bees a "Coolness" rating of five out of five, an "Impact" rating of two out of five, and a "Creepiness" rating of two out of five.

=== Alien rebels ===
Alien rebels
- The faceless rebels, as seen in season five.
- First appearance: "Patient X"
- Last appearance: "One Son"

In-universe information
- Affiliated with: Colonists

There also exists a faction of aliens who actively oppose Colonization. They are the same species as the Alien Bounty Hunter(s), free from the effects of black oil infection. The Rebels are distinguished by their grotesque appearance: the orifices on their face are morphed shut to avoid absorption of the parasitic black oil. Colonization has apparently begun in the Rebels' home environment, but members of this species are spared gestation to become Bounty Hunters for the Colonists' ongoing conquest efforts. Although enemies of the Colonists, the Rebels can also be hostile to humanity; they carry prod-like weapons that can quickly incinerate a human and do not hesitate to use them. They burn abductees with chips in their necks at abduction sites in attempts to prevent colonization from proceeding.

The Rebels have a vested interest in keeping the Colonists from finding out that a successful hybrid has been created. While the Rebels had an opportunity to destroy the hybrid, Cassandra Spender, they choose to let her survive in the hope that the Syndicate will join them in fighting the Colonists. If they refuse, Cassandra can be used to expose the truth and the conspiracy. The Rebels go so far as to infiltrate the Syndicate and bring up the possibility of fighting the Colonists. However, the Syndicate decides that fighting the Colonists would be futile. At this point, a fully working vaccine has not been created, and it is therefore decided that the best thing for the Syndicate to do is to comply with the original deal and turn over the hybrid to the Colonists in the hope that they are spared the resulting takeover. Before this can be done, however, the Rebels kill all but a few members of the Syndicate in addition to Cassandra, the only living successful alien-human hybrid, before the Syndicate is able to send a signal to the Colonists. Without a successful hybrid, the timetable for the Colonist invasion will not be advanced and the date set for colonization remains December 22, 2012.

==== Conceptual history ====
Frank Spotnitz explained that, despite their tendency of killing human abductees, the rebels can really be viewed as allies of mankind. He said in the commentary of "One Son" that the faceless rebels and the human race are the only two species of advanced civilization in the galaxy that have not been consumed by the black oil. Thus, he notes that at the end of the episode "humanity has lost, Mulder has lost, and the rebels in fact save the day, ultimately by stopping the delivery of Cassandra Spender to the aliens".

The initial look of the rebels was created by special effects supervisor Tony Lindala, during the production of "Patient X". Spotnitz had a problem with the visual effects used for the rebels in "One Son", going so far as to say that the effects of them landing were among the worst ever created for the show. He noted that the effects were created on short notice, saying "It was one of those cases where you just run out of time, sorry to say." Spotnitz later said that the overall production values were fantastic, but that he wished he could have changed some things about the episode; in particular, he wished to have done the scene wherein one of the Syndicate members changes into an alien rebel differently.

=== Alien-human hybrids ===
Alien-human hybrid
- First appearance: "Paper Clip" (first mentioned)
- Last appearance: "One Son"
- Portrayed by: Veronica Cartwright

In-universe information
- Affiliated with: Colonists; Syndicate; The X-Files

Early attempts to create alien-human hybrids were pioneered by German and Japanese scientists shortly after World War II, and for some time during the Cold War. However, these often met with failure, and the Syndicate started to rely more on their own scientists. According to the Alien Bounty Hunter, in the 1950s, Soviet geneticists found a unique genetic anomaly within identical twins. The Colonists and Syndicate scientists used this to eventually develop human clones with alien elements and partial hybrids, but they were still ultimately inferior. Hybrids of this type include Samantha Mulder, Kurt Crawford, the Gregors, Ernest Calderon, and Dr. William Secare. Child and adult versions of Samantha and Kurt are also seen. These clones have the same caustic greenish blood of the aliens, have greater muscular strength and higher physical endurance levels than most normal humans, and can breathe underwater. In addition to their intended use by the alien colonists, the Syndicate is occasionally seen using these clones to perform various tasks, such as research and physical labor.

The pinnacle of the project is Cassandra Spender (Veronica Cartwright), mother of Jeffrey Spender (Chris Owens) and ex-wife of The Smoking Man. Cassandra is a hybrid created through a process other than cloning, and worked on by both the Syndicate and the aliens themselves, although the exact methods used to transform her are never fully revealed. The experiment presumably began when she, along with other family members of the Syndicate, were turned over to the colonists in 1973. For years, Cassandra was under the mistaken impression that she was to be an emissary of the aliens to spread a higher spiritual understanding to humanity, but after her final abduction in the late 1990s she comes to realize the truth. She is killed, along with most of the Syndicate, by the alien rebels.

After being exposed to an alien artifact, Mulder slipped into a coma, although he was imbued with telepathic abilities. In order to find a cure for her partner, Dana Scully (Gillian Anderson) discovered a book containing Native American beliefs and practices; the books described how one man would be able to hold off the forces of the apocalypse and become humanity's savior. Meanwhile, The Smoking Man took Mulder and prepped to have his genetic material—the same material that allowed Mulder to become telepathic—implanted into him. He believed that Mulder had, in effect, become a perfect alien-human hybrid and that by taking his genetic material, he would be able to continue "The Project" and survive the coming alien onslaught.

=== "Super Soldiers" ===
"Super Soldiers"
- First appearance: "Per Manum"
- Last appearance: "The Truth"
- Portrayed by: Adam Baldwin; Various actors

In-universe information
- Affiliated with: Colonists; New Syndicate

With nearly every Syndicate member dead, the Colonists began to clear up any evidence of alien life and began to create human replacements called "Super Soldiers", on which the Colonists had been working covertly as an alternative slave race should the hybridization experiments be unsuccessful. To create Super Soldiers, the Colonists infect humans with a new strain of their virus, which slowly destroys and then rebuilds the body of the host. This process seems to involve a lengthy surgical procedure on abductees as opposed to simple infection (as with the black oil). As they have normal red blood and can replace individuals within powerful positions, they provide an ideal way for the Colonists to infiltrate humanity to ensure that the plans for colonization are uninterrupted. They are identifiable however by small spiny protrusions on the backs of their necks or by detailed analysis of a blood sample which shows their DNA exists as a complex with iron. Although they cannot shapeshift, Super Soldiers are practically unstoppable. They can survive being crushed by a garbage compactor, decapitation, and can rip through steel with their bare hands. The only known way to kill them takes advantage of their metallic biochemistry: their bodies are torn apart by the magnetic fields present near large deposits of magnetite ore. The Super Soldiers quietly fill the positions of power previously occupied by Syndicate members and rarely use human conspirators. By the end of season 9 they virtually replaced the Syndicate and were successful in chasing Mulder and Scully out of the FBI so that they can no longer investigate the X-Files and interfere with their plans. As of their last appearance, they were preparing for the final invasion in 2012.

==== Reception ====
Critical reception to the super-soldiers was mixed. The A.V. Club was highly critical of the final season and its mythology story, noting that the "new serialized storylines about so-called 'super soldiers'" resulted in a "clumsy mish-mash of" ideas that worked and did not. Not all reviews were negative, however. Den of Geek also named the Super Soldiers among "The Top 10 X-Files Baddies". The site wrote moderately positively of the Super soldiers and applauded the show's continuity, citing their decision to make Billy Miles, a character who appeared in the series' pilot episode, the first super-soldier. However, the review did call them not "as interesting as what came before them". The site awarded the super soldiers a "Coolness" rating of three out of five, an "Impact" rating of three out of five, and a "Creepiness" rating of two out of five.
