= John Doggett =

Fictional character in The X-Files (television series)

- The X-Files character
- First appearance: "Within"
- Last appearance: "The Truth (Part II)"
- Portrayed by: Robert Patrick
- City: Washington, D.C.
- Born: John Jay Doggett
- Date of birth: April 4, 1960; Atlanta, Georgia, U.S.

In-universe information
- Occupation: FBI Special Agent
- Family: Barbara Doggett
- Children: Luke Doggett
- Partners: Dana Scully; Monica Reyes
- Affiliations: Fox Mulder; Walter Skinner; The Lone Gunmen
- Duration: 2000–02
- Seasons: 8, 9

FBI Special Agent John Jay Doggett is a fictional character in the Fox television series The X-Files. With his FBI partners Dana Scully (season 8) and Monica Reyes (season 9), he works on the X-Files which are cases with particularly mysterious or possibly supernatural circumstances that were left unsolved and shelved by the FBI. John Doggett is played by Robert Patrick. Doggett was a main character from the eighth to ninth seasons (2000–2002), replacing David Duchovny's character Fox Mulder. Doggett appeared in the opening credits and every episode from the season eight premiere to the final episode of season 9.

Doggett made his first appearance in the 2000 episode "Within". Doggett served in the United States Marine Corps from the 1970s to the 1980s. Later he started working for the New York Police Department, he was eventually promoted to detective. After his son's death, he got a job in the FBI. He started to work for the Criminal Investigations Division. In 2000, he was assigned to the X-Files office, after the disappearance of Mulder. The introduction of Doggett was met with mostly positive reaction by critics, while getting more mixed response from longtime fans of the series.

== Character arc ==
Doggett served in the United States Marine Corps in the 24th Marine Amphibious Unit from 1977 to 1983. His final rank was Sergeant (E-5). While serving in the military, he became good friends with fellow Marine Knowle Rohrer. From 1982 to 1983, Doggett played a role in the Multi-National Peacekeeping Force in Lebanon. He served during the 1983 Beirut barracks bombings. Doggett retired from the U.S. Marine Corps with commendations after being wounded in the line of duty. After gaining a Juris Doctor and a Master's degree in Public Administration from Syracuse University, Doggett went on to work for the New York Police Department from 1987 to 1995, eventually becoming a detective in the Fugitive Division's Warrant section. While he was working for the NYPD, his son, Luke Doggett (played in flashbacks by Jake Fritz), was abducted and murdered. Doggett teamed up with Special Agent Monica Reyes, who was working out of the New York City FBI field office at the time, to search for his son's killer. After his son's death, Doggett's marriage to Barbara Doggett (played by Patrick's real-life wife Barbara) ended in divorce.

In 1995, Doggett graduated from the FBI Academy and assumed the position of FBI Special Agent in the Criminal Investigations Division. In 2000, Agent Doggett was assigned by Deputy Director Alvin Kersh to head up the manhunt to find Special Agent Fox Mulder. The manhunt was unsuccessful and Doggett was demoted to work on the X-Files with Special Agent Dana Scully. During this time, Doggett and Kersh developed a bitter enmity, similar to the early relationship between Mulder and Walter Skinner.

Initially, Scully and Doggett were not very trusting of each other. After years of investigating several X-Files cases with Mulder, Scully had slowly grown to believe in the existence of the paranormal. Doggett, however, is a no-nonsense agent, who frequently utilizes his down-to-earth sensibilities he learned as a Marine and a cop. Doggett therefore functioned as "the skeptic", while Scully somewhat served in Mulder's old position of "the believer". Gradually, Doggett and Scully came to trust one another to some degree, although he and Mulder, who later returned and recovered from his abduction, remained untrusting of each other for some time. Doggett and his new partner, Reyes, took charge of the X-Files after Mulder was fired from the FBI and Scully left active duty to teach at the FBI Academy and to care for her son, Baby William. In the series finale, Doggett testified on Mulder's behalf when Mulder was charged with murder. Later, he and Reyes narrowly escaped from Knowle Rohrer, who Doggett had discovered about a year prior was working for the conspiracy. At the end of the series, Doggett is likely a regular agent, as it appears that Kersh was forced to close down the X-Files division.

Doggett does not appear, nor is he mentioned, in the 2008 X-Files feature film. He similarly does not appear or is mentioned in the 2016 television revival of The X-Files.

== Conceptual history ==
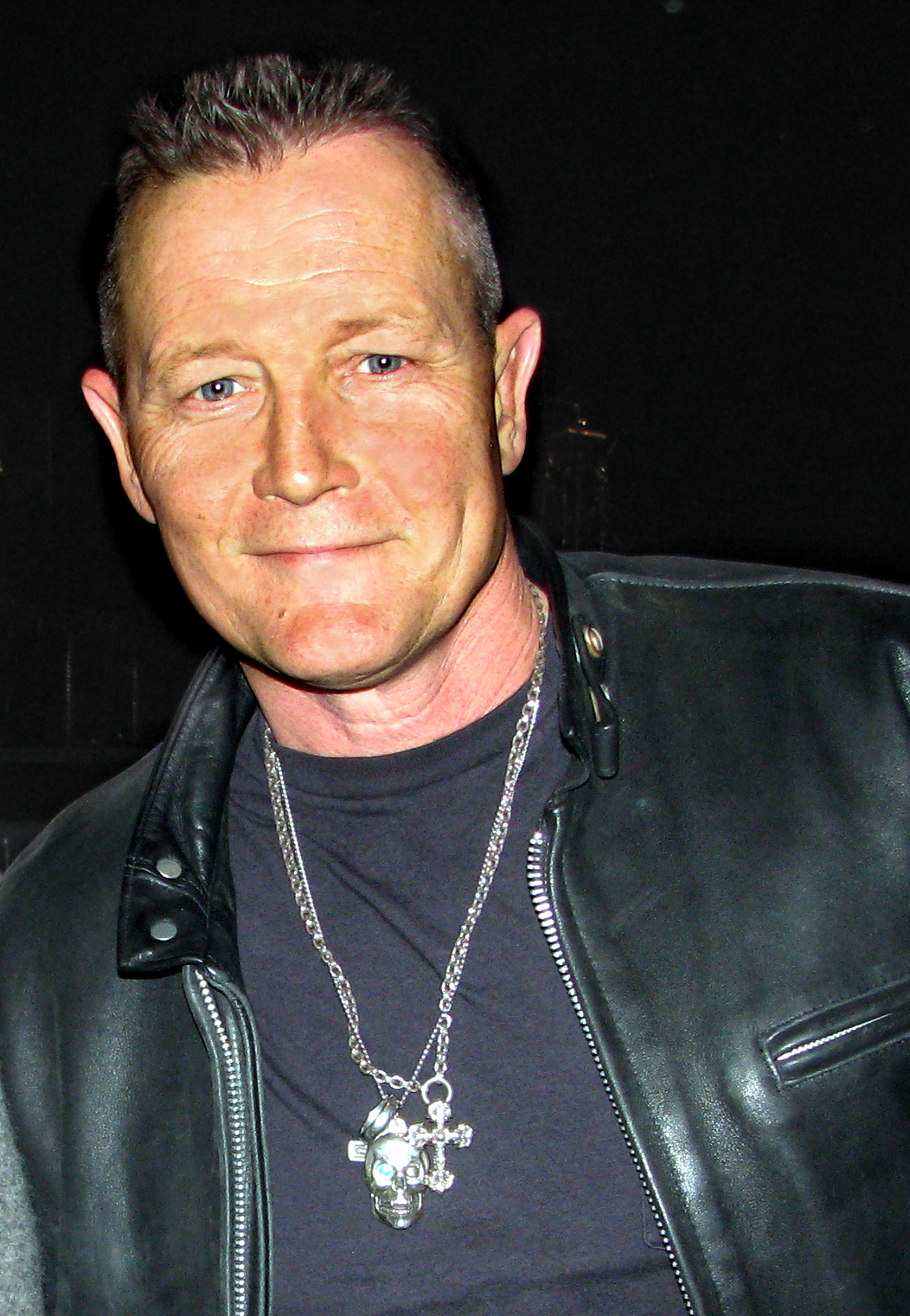
Patrick at a convention, taken in December, 2007

More than one hundred actors auditioned for the role, but only ten were taken seriously by the producers. Known actors such as Lou Diamond Phillips and Hart Bochner were among the auditionees for the role as Agent Doggett. Both Phillips and Bochner were considered for the role, but the producers eventually chose Robert Patrick. Chris Carter said "I think it was something that we all talked about, but I wrote his voice. So, I think he was someone we all came up with together, but his voice came out of my head. But, it was something that was helped in a large degree by casting Robert Patrick."

Patrick had an obligation to work on another series after being cast as Doggett. The series was entitled L.A. Sheriff's Homicide and was shooting its pilot episode. Carter was able to broker a deal with the other studio, paving the way for Patrick's portrayal of Doggett in season eight premiere "Within". Doggett was modeled after Bud White from the 1997 feature film, L.A. Confidential. Carter had previously named Dana Scully after Los Angeles Dodgers announcer Vin Scully, and he decided to name the new character after Vin Scully's longtime broadcasting partner Jerry Doggett as an homage. Before the character got a name, he was referred to by the producers as "Agent White".

Carter was inspired to write the scene in which Scully throws water into Doggett's face, due to Carter being aware that new actor Patrick would be facing opposition from some members of the fan community, Patrick has even called that scene his favorite ever shot for the series, admitting that he couldn't think of a better way to introduce the character and that the scene not only said a lot but that it had actually helped him. The introduction of the new character in the eighth season was one of two main factors that influenced the series' production personnel to decide to go back to more serious episodes. The other major reason was to avoid "trivializing the absence of Mulder".

== Reception ==
Some members of the fanbase criticized the introduction of Doggett, claiming that the character had been intentionally created to replace previous lead Fox Mulder's work. Chris Carter responded to this with a denial of the accuracy of their claims, and further stated in an interview with National Public Radio (NPR), "What he brings is a different approach to The X-Files. First of all, he's a knee jerk skeptic so he couldn't be more different than the character of Mulder. He's an insider at the FBI, well liked, has buddies. Mulder, of course, he's been banished to the basement along with all of his X-files. So when he's put together with Agent Scully, who has become something of a reluctant believer, the dynamic on the show changes completely".

Robert Patrick was awarded a Saturn Award in the category "Best Television Actor" in 2001 for his role as Doggett, winning over such nominees as Richard Dean Anderson for his work as Jack O'Neill on Stargate SG-1. He was also nominated for the award the following year. Entertainment Weekly reviewer Ken Tucker said that Patrick's portrayal brought "hardboiled alertness" to the series, being overall positive towards the new character. Anita Gates from The New York Times said that most fans had "accepted" Doggett, and further commented that the character actually looked "like a Secret Service Agent." Kathie Huddleston from Sci Fi Wire commented on the absence of Mulder, calling Patrick a "fine actor", and asserting that the character was "way-too-serious" to be intended as a direct replacement for Mulder. Carter commented on the character, saying "everybody likes Robert Patrick and the character", but added that fans missed David Duchovny and his character. Patrick's performance saw him named as one of "The Ten Sexiest Men of Sci-Fi" by TV Guide.
