= List of The X-Files episodes =

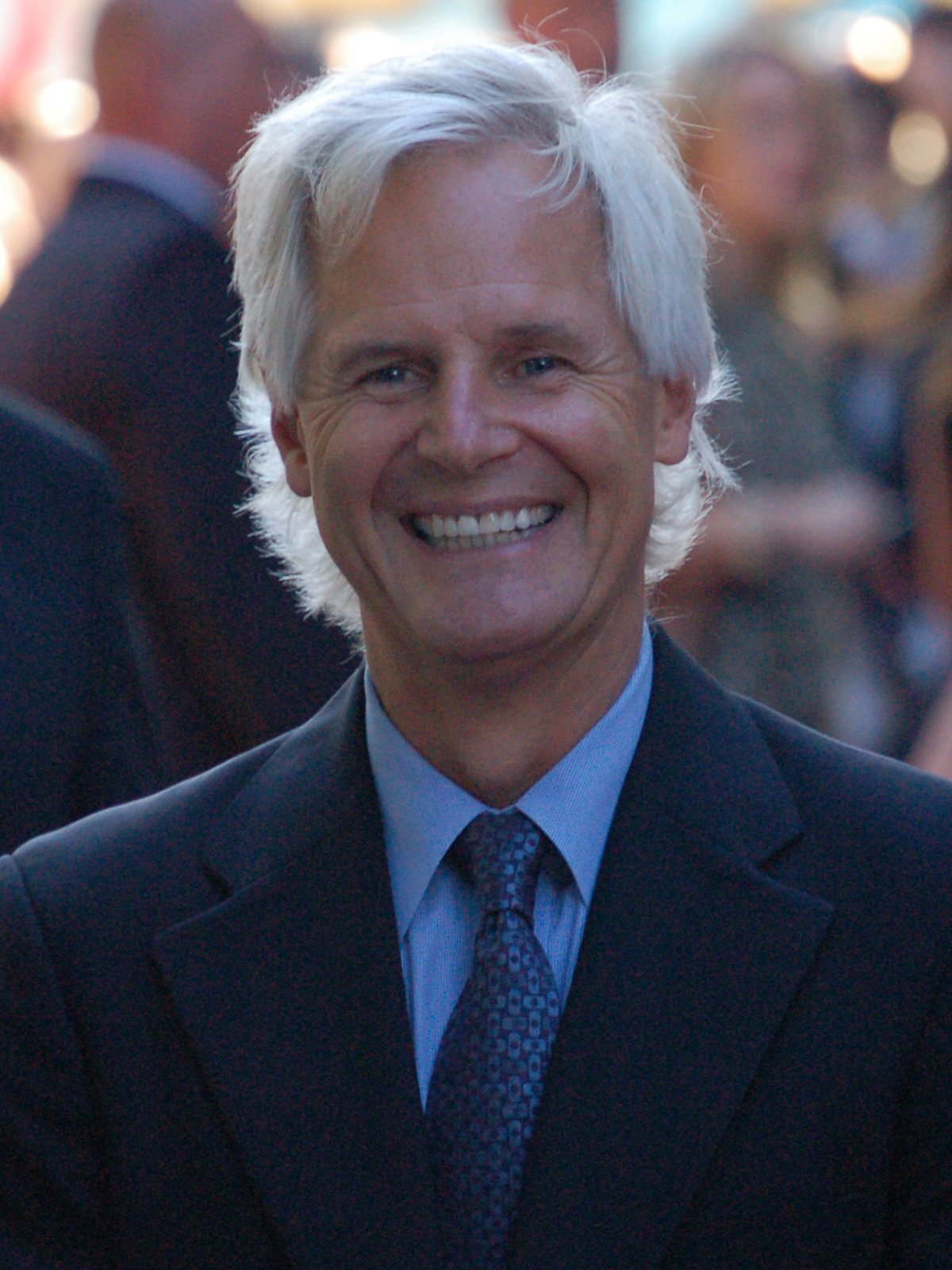
Chris Carter created The X-Files, which premiered on September 10, 1993.

The X-Files is an American science fiction–supernatural television series that originally aired on the Fox network for nine seasons from September 10, 1993, to May 19, 2002. The series centers on FBI special agents Fox Mulder (David Duchovny) and Dana Scully (Gillian Anderson), who work on cases linked to the paranormal, called X-Files. Mulder, an FBI profiler, is a believer in the paranormal, and the skeptical Scully, a medical doctor, is assigned to make scientific analyses of Mulder's discoveries which could ultimately be used to discredit his work. Throughout the series the two develop a close friendship. During the eighth and ninth seasons of the series, Duchovny's role was reduced from lead actor to an intermittent lead role.

The show's premise originated with Chris Carter, who served as an executive producer along with R. W. Goodwin, Frank Spotnitz, Howard Gordon, Vince Gilligan, John Shiban, Kim Manners, Glen Morgan, James Wong, and many others. Filming for seasons one to five took place primarily in Vancouver, British Columbia, and for the remaining seasons in Los Angeles.

Episodes were broadcast on Fridays at 9:00 pm Eastern Time for the series' first three seasons; the following six seasons aired on Sundays at 9:00 pm Eastern Time. Episodes are approximately 45 minutes in length (not including commercials) and were broadcast in standard definition. Two feature films based on the television series have been released as part of The X-Files franchise: the first premiered in summer 1998, between seasons five and six of the series, and a post-series film, The X-Files: I Want to Believe, was released in 2008. On March 24, 2015, Fox officially announced the series would return for a six-episode tenth season, which aired in 2016. On April 20, 2017, Fox officially announced The X-Files would be returning for an eleventh season of ten episodes, which premiered on January 3, 2018. As of March 21, 2018, 218 episodes of The X-Files have aired, concluding the eleventh season.

Many mythology collections of The X-Files episodes have been released on DVD. Since 2000, 20th Century Fox Home Entertainment has distributed all seasons on DVD, and episodes are also available for download at the iTunes Store and Amazon Video, and are available for streaming on Hulu. The show's episodes have won a number of awards, including three Golden Globe Awards for Best Drama Series and a Satellite Award for Best Drama Series. Various cast members' performances have been praised by critics, particularly those of Duchovny and Anderson.

== Series overview ==
Season	Episodes	Originally released		Average viewers (millions)	Rank
Season	Episodes	First released	Last released	Average viewers (millions)	Rank
1	24	September 10, 1993	May 13, 1994	11.21	111
2	25	September 16, 1994	May 19, 1995	14.50	63
3	24	September 22, 1995	May 17, 1996	15.40	55
4	24	October 4, 1996	May 18, 1997	19.20	20
5	20	November 2, 1997	May 17, 1998	19.80	11
Fight the Future		June 19, 1998		—N/a	—N/a
6	22	November 8, 1998	May 16, 1999	17.20	12
7	22	November 7, 1999	May 21, 2000	14.20	29
8	21	November 5, 2000	May 20, 2001	13.93	31
9	20	November 11, 2001	May 19, 2002	9.10	63
I Want to Believe		July 25, 2008		—N/a	—N/a
10	6	January 24, 2016	February 22, 2016	9.53	7
11	10	January 3, 2018	March 21, 2018	3.74	91

== Episodes ==
Episodes marked with a double dagger (‡) are episodes in the series' alien mythology arc. (Note: Although "The Gift" was not included on the mythology compilation DVD The X-Files Mythology, Volume 3 – Colonization, it was labelled as a mythology episode in the official guide book The Complete X-Files: Behind the Series the Myths and the Movies, released in 2008.)

=== Season 1 (1993–94) ===
No. overall	No. in season	Title	Directed by	Written by	Original release date	Prod. code	U.S. viewers (millions)
1	1	"Pilot"‡	Robert Mandel	Chris Carter	September 10, 1993	1X79	12.0
2	2	"Deep Throat"‡	Daniel Sackheim	Chris Carter	September 17, 1993	1X01	11.1
3	3	"Squeeze"	Harry Longstreet	Glen Morgan & James Wong	September 24, 1993	1X02	11.1
4	4	"Conduit"	Daniel Sackheim	Alex Gansa & Howard Gordon	October 1, 1993	1X03	9.2
5	5	"The Jersey Devil"	Joe Napolitano	Chris Carter	October 8, 1993	1X04	10.4
6	6	"Shadows"	Michael Katleman	Glen Morgan & James Wong	October 22, 1993	1X05	8.8
7	7	"Ghost in the Machine"	Jerrold Freedman	Alex Gansa & Howard Gordon	October 29, 1993	1X06	9.5
8	8	"Ice"	David Nutter	Glen Morgan & James Wong	November 5, 1993	1X07	10.0
9	9	"Space"	William Graham	Chris Carter	November 12, 1993	1X08	10.7
10	10	"Fallen Angel"‡	Larry Shaw	Howard Gordon & Alex Gansa	November 19, 1993	1X09	8.8
11	11	"Eve"	Fred Gerber	Kenneth Biller & Chris Brancato	December 10, 1993	1X10	10.4
12	12	"Fire"	Larry Shaw	Chris Carter	December 17, 1993	1X11	11.1
13	13	"Beyond the Sea"	David Nutter	Glen Morgan & James Wong	January 7, 1994	1X12	10.8
14	14	"Gender Bender"	Rob Bowman	Larry Barber & Paul Barber	January 21, 1994	1X13	11.1
15	15	"Lazarus"	David Nutter	Alex Gansa & Howard Gordon	February 4, 1994	1X14	12.1
16	16	"Young at Heart"	Michael Lange	Scott Kaufer and Chris Carter	February 11, 1994	1X15	11.5
17	17	"E.B.E."‡	William Graham	Glen Morgan & James Wong	February 18, 1994	1X16	9.2
18	18	"Miracle Man"	Michael Lange	Chris Carter & Howard Gordon	March 18, 1994	1X17	11.6
19	19	"Shapes"	David Nutter	Marilyn Osborn	April 1, 1994	1X18	11.5
20	20	"Darkness Falls"	Joe Napolitano	Chris Carter	April 15, 1994	1X19	12.5
21	21	"Tooms"	David Nutter	Glen Morgan & James Wong	April 22, 1994	1X20	13.4
22	22	"Born Again"	Jerrold Freedman	Howard Gordon & Alex Gansa	April 29, 1994	1X21	13.7
23	23	"Roland"	David Nutter	Chris Ruppenthal	May 6, 1994	1X22	12.5
24	24	"The Erlenmeyer Flask"‡	R. W. Goodwin	Chris Carter	May 13, 1994	1X23	14.0

=== Season 2 (1994–95) ===
No. overall	No. in season	Title	Directed by	Written by	Original release date	Prod. code	U.S. viewers (millions)
25	1	"Little Green Men"‡	David Nutter	Glen Morgan & James Wong	September 16, 1994	2X01	16.1
26	2	"The Host"	Daniel Sackheim	Chris Carter	September 23, 1994	2X02	15.9
27	3	"Blood"	David Nutter	Story by : Darin Morgan; Teleplay by : Glen Morgan & James Wong	September 30, 1994	2X03	14.8
28	4	"Sleepless"	Rob Bowman	Howard Gordon	October 7, 1994	2X04	13.4
29	5	"Duane Barry"‡	Chris Carter	Chris Carter	October 14, 1994	2X05	13.9
30	6	"Ascension"‡	Michael Lange	Paul Brown	October 21, 1994	2X06	15.5
31	7	"3"	David Nutter	Chris Ruppenthal and Glen Morgan & James Wong	November 4, 1994	2X07	15.0
32	8	"One Breath"‡	R. W. Goodwin	Glen Morgan & James Wong	November 11, 1994	2X08	15.3
33	9	"Firewalker"	David Nutter	Howard Gordon	November 18, 1994	2X09	15.2
34	10	"Red Museum"‡	Win Phelps	Chris Carter	December 9, 1994	2X10	16.1
35	11	"Excelsis Dei"	Stephen Surjik	Paul Brown	December 16, 1994	2X11	14.2
36	12	"Aubrey"	Rob Bowman	Sara B. Charno	January 6, 1995	2X12	16.2
37	13	"Irresistible"	David Nutter	Chris Carter	January 13, 1995	2X13	14.7
38	14	"Die Hand Die Verletzt"	Kim Manners	Glen Morgan & James Wong	January 27, 1995	2X14	17.7
39	15	"Fresh Bones"	Rob Bowman	Howard Gordon	February 3, 1995	2X15	17.8
40	16	"Colony"‡	Nick Marck	Story by : David Duchovny & Chris Carter; Teleplay by : Chris Carter	February 10, 1995	2X16	15.9
41	17	"End Game"‡	Rob Bowman	Frank Spotnitz	February 17, 1995	2X17	17.5
42	18	"Fearful Symmetry"	James Whitmore, Jr.	Steve De Jarnatt	February 24, 1995	2X18	16.5
43	19	"Død Kalm"	Rob Bowman	Story by : Howard Gordon; Teleplay by : Howard Gordon & Alex Gansa	March 10, 1995	2X19	17.1
44	20	"Humbug"	Kim Manners	Darin Morgan	March 31, 1995	2X20	15.7
45	21	"The Calusari"	Michael Vejar	Sara B. Charno	April 14, 1995	2X21	12.9
46	22	"F. Emasculata"	Rob Bowman	Chris Carter & Howard Gordon	April 28, 1995	2X22	14.0
47	23	"Soft Light"	James Contner	Vince Gilligan	May 5, 1995	2X23	12.9
48	24	"Our Town"	Rob Bowman	Frank Spotnitz	May 12, 1995	2X24	14.5
49	25	"Anasazi"‡	R. W. Goodwin	Story by : David Duchovny & Chris Carter; Teleplay by : Chris Carter	May 19, 1995	2X25	16.6

=== Season 3 (1995–96) ===
No. overall	No. in season	Title	Directed by	Written by	Original release date	Prod. code	U.S. viewers (millions)
50	1	"The Blessing Way"‡	R. W. Goodwin	Chris Carter	September 22, 1995	3X01	19.94
51	2	"Paper Clip"‡	Rob Bowman	Chris Carter	September 29, 1995	3X02	17.20
52	3	"D.P.O."	Kim Manners	Howard Gordon	October 6, 1995	3X03	15.57
53	4	"Clyde Bruckman's Final Repose"	David Nutter	Darin Morgan	October 13, 1995	3X04	15.38
54	5	"The List"	Chris Carter	Chris Carter	October 20, 1995	3X05	16.72
55	6	"2Shy"	David Nutter	Jeffrey Vlaming	November 3, 1995	3X06	14.83
56	7	"The Walk"	Rob Bowman	John Shiban	November 10, 1995	3X07	15.91
57	8	"Oubliette"	Kim Manners	Charles Grant Craig	November 17, 1995	3X08	15.90
58	9	"Nisei"‡	David Nutter	Chris Carter & Howard Gordon & Frank Spotnitz	November 24, 1995	3X09	16.36
59	10	"731"‡	Rob Bowman	Frank Spotnitz	December 1, 1995	3X10	17.68
60	11	"Revelations"	David Nutter	Kim Newton	December 15, 1995	3X11	15.25
61	12	"War of the Coprophages"	Kim Manners	Darin Morgan	January 5, 1996	3X12	16.32
62	13	"Syzygy"	Rob Bowman	Chris Carter	January 26, 1996	3X13	16.04
63	14	"Grotesque"	Kim Manners	Howard Gordon	February 2, 1996	3X14	18.32
64	15	"Piper Maru"‡	Rob Bowman	Frank Spotnitz & Chris Carter	February 9, 1996	3X15	16.44
65	16	"Apocrypha"‡	Kim Manners	Frank Spotnitz & Chris Carter	February 16, 1996	3X16	16.71
66	17	"Pusher"	Rob Bowman	Vince Gilligan	February 23, 1996	3X17	16.20
67	18	"Teso Dos Bichos"	Kim Manners	John Shiban	March 8, 1996	3X18	17.38
68	19	"Hell Money"	Tucker Gates	Jeffrey Vlaming	March 29, 1996	3X19	14.86
69	20	"Jose Chung's From Outer Space"	Rob Bowman	Darin Morgan	April 12, 1996	3X20	16.08
70	21	"Avatar"	James Charleston	Story by : David Duchovny & Howard Gordon; Teleplay by : Howard Gordon	April 26, 1996	3X21	14.62
71	22	"Quagmire"	Kim Manners	Kim Newton	May 3, 1996	3X22	16.00
72	23	"Wetwired"	Rob Bowman	Mat Beck	May 10, 1996	3X23	14.48
73	24	"Talitha Cumi"‡	R. W. Goodwin	Story by : David Duchovny & Chris Carter; Teleplay by : Chris Carter	May 17, 1996	3X24	17.86

=== Season 4 (1996–97) ===
No. overall	No. in season	Title	Directed by	Written by	Original release date	Prod. code	U.S. viewers (millions)
74	1	"Herrenvolk"‡	R. W. Goodwin	Chris Carter	October 4, 1996	4X01	21.11
75	2	"Home"	Kim Manners	Glen Morgan & James Wong	October 11, 1996	4X03	18.85
76	3	"Teliko"	James Charleston	Howard Gordon	October 18, 1996	4X04	18.01
77	4	"Unruhe"	Rob Bowman	Vince Gilligan	October 27, 1996	4X02	19.10
78	5	"The Field Where I Died"	Rob Bowman	Glen Morgan & James Wong	November 3, 1996	4X05	19.85
79	6	"Sanguinarium"	Kim Manners	Valerie Mayhew & Vivian Mayhew	November 10, 1996	4X06	18.85
80	7	"Musings of a Cigarette Smoking Man"‡	James Wong	Glen Morgan	November 17, 1996	4X07	17.09
81	8	"Tunguska"‡	Kim Manners	Frank Spotnitz & Chris Carter	November 24, 1996	4X09	18.85
82	9	"Terma"‡	Rob Bowman	Frank Spotnitz & Chris Carter	December 1, 1996	4X10	17.34
83	10	"Paper Hearts"	Rob Bowman	Vince Gilligan	December 15, 1996	4X08	16.59
84	11	"El Mundo Gira"	Tucker Gates	John Shiban	January 12, 1997	4X11	22.37
85	12	"Leonard Betts"	Kim Manners	Vince Gilligan & John Shiban & Frank Spotnitz	January 26, 1997	4X14	29.15
86	13	"Never Again"	Rob Bowman	Glen Morgan & James Wong	February 2, 1997	4X13	21.36
87	14	"Memento Mori"‡	Rob Bowman	Chris Carter & Vince Gilligan & John Shiban & Frank Spotnitz	February 9, 1997	4X15	19.10
88	15	"Kaddish"	Kim Manners	Howard Gordon	February 16, 1997	4X12	16.56
89	16	"Unrequited"	Michael Lange	Story by : Howard Gordon; Teleplay by : Howard Gordon & Chris Carter	February 23, 1997	4X16	16.56
90	17	"Tempus Fugit"‡	Rob Bowman	Chris Carter & Frank Spotnitz	March 16, 1997	4X17	18.85
91	18	"Max"‡	Kim Manners	Chris Carter & Frank Spotnitz	March 23, 1997	4X18	18.34
92	19	"Synchrony"	James Charleston	Howard Gordon & David Greenwalt	April 13, 1997	4X19	18.09
93	20	"Small Potatoes"	Cliff Bole	Vince Gilligan	April 20, 1997	4X20	20.86
94	21	"Zero Sum"‡	Kim Manners	Howard Gordon & Frank Spotnitz	April 27, 1997	4X21	18.60
95	22	"Elegy"	James Charleston	John Shiban	May 4, 1997	4X22	17.10
96	23	"Demons"‡	Kim Manners	R. W. Goodwin	May 11, 1997	4X23	19.10
97	24	"Gethsemane"‡	R. W. Goodwin	Chris Carter	May 18, 1997	4X24	19.85

=== Season 5 (1997–98) ===
No. overall	No. in season	Title	Directed by	Written by	Original release date	Prod. code	U.S. viewers (millions)
98	1	"Redux"‡	R. W. Goodwin	Chris Carter	November 2, 1997	5X02	27.34
99	2	"Redux II"‡	Kim Manners	Chris Carter	November 9, 1997	5X03	24.84
100	3	"Unusual Suspects"	Kim Manners	Vince Gilligan	November 16, 1997	5X01	21.72
101	4	"Detour"	Brett Dowler	Frank Spotnitz	November 23, 1997	5X04	22.88
102	5	"The Post-Modern Prometheus"	Chris Carter	Chris Carter	November 30, 1997	5X06	18.68
103	6	"Christmas Carol"‡	Peter Markle	Vince Gilligan & John Shiban & Frank Spotnitz	December 7, 1997	5X05	20.91
104	7	"Emily"‡	Kim Manners	Vince Gilligan & John Shiban & Frank Spotnitz	December 14, 1997	5X07	20.94
105	8	"Kitsunegari"	Daniel Sackheim	Vince Gilligan & Tim Minear	January 4, 1998	5X08	19.75
106	9	"Schizogeny"	Ralph Hemecker	Jessica Scott & Mike Wollaeger	January 11, 1998	5X09	21.37
107	10	"Chinga"	Kim Manners	Stephen King & Chris Carter	February 8, 1998	5X10	21.33
108	11	"Kill Switch"	Rob Bowman	William Gibson & Tom Maddox	February 15, 1998	5X11	18.04
109	12	"Bad Blood"	Cliff Bole	Vince Gilligan	February 22, 1998	5X12	19.25
110	13	"Patient X"‡	Kim Manners	Chris Carter & Frank Spotnitz	March 1, 1998	5X13	20.21
111	14	"The Red and the Black"‡	Chris Carter	Chris Carter & Frank Spotnitz	March 8, 1998	5X14	19.98
112	15	"Travelers"	William A. Graham	John Shiban & Frank Spotnitz	March 29, 1998	5X15	15.06
113	16	"Mind's Eye"	Kim Manners	Tim Minear	April 19, 1998	5X16	16.53
114	17	"All Souls"	Allen Coulter	Story by : Billy Brown & Dan Angel; Teleplay by : Frank Spotnitz & John Shiban	April 26, 1998	5X17	13.44
115	18	"The Pine Bluff Variant"	Rob Bowman	John Shiban	May 3, 1998	5X18	18.24
116	19	"Folie à Deux"	Kim Manners	Vince Gilligan	May 10, 1998	5X19	17.63
117	20	"The End"‡	R. W. Goodwin	Chris Carter	May 17, 1998	5X20	18.76

=== The X-Files (1998) ===
Title	Directed by	Written by	Release date (U.S.)
The X-Files‡	Rob Bowman	Story by : Chris Carter & Frank Spotnitz; Screenplay by : Chris Carter	June 19, 1998
The film takes place between seasons 5 and 6. The X-Files have been shut down, and Mulder and Scully are dealing with a terrorist threat. However, when a government building is destroyed, Mulder is approached by a mysterious doctor who reveals that there was more to the bomb than meets the eye. Mulder and Scully's investigations lead to the discovery of several secret installations and the true nature of the relationship between the alien colonists and the Syndicate.

=== Season 6 (1998–99) ===
No. overall	No. in season	Title	Directed by	Written by	Original release date	Prod. code	U.S. viewers (millions)
118	1	"The Beginning"‡	Kim Manners	Chris Carter	November 8, 1998	6ABX01	20.34
119	2	"Drive"	Rob Bowman	Vince Gilligan	November 15, 1998	6ABX02	18.48
120	3	"Triangle"	Chris Carter	Chris Carter	November 22, 1998	6ABX03	18.20
121	4	"Dreamland"	Rob Bowman	Vince Gilligan & John Shiban & Frank Spotnitz	November 29, 1998	6ABX04	17.48
122	5	"Dreamland II"	Michael Watkins	Vince Gilligan & John Shiban & Frank Spotnitz	December 6, 1998	6ABX05	17.01
123	6	"How the Ghosts Stole Christmas"	Chris Carter	Chris Carter	December 13, 1998	6ABX08	17.31
124	7	"Terms of Endearment"	Rob Bowman	David Amann	January 3, 1999	6ABX06	18.69
125	8	"The Rain King"	Kim Manners	Jeffrey Bell	January 10, 1999	6ABX07	21.24
126	9	"S.R. 819"‡	Daniel Sackheim	John Shiban	January 17, 1999	6ABX10	15.65
127	10	"Tithonus"	Michael Watkins	Vince Gilligan	January 24, 1999	6ABX09	15.83
128	11	"Two Fathers"‡	Kim Manners	Chris Carter & Frank Spotnitz	February 7, 1999	6ABX11	18.81
129	12	"One Son"‡	Rob Bowman	Chris Carter & Frank Spotnitz	February 14, 1999	6ABX12	16.57
130	13	"Agua Mala"	Rob Bowman	David Amann	February 21, 1999	6ABX14	16.91
131	14	"Monday"	Kim Manners	Vince Gilligan & John Shiban	February 28, 1999	6ABX15	16.74
132	15	"Arcadia"	Michael Watkins	Daniel Arkin	March 7, 1999	6ABX13	17.91
133	16	"Alpha"	Peter Markle	Jeffrey Bell	March 28, 1999	6ABX16	17.67
134	17	"Trevor"	Rob Bowman	Jim Guttridge & Ken Hawryliw	April 11, 1999	6ABX17	17.65
135	18	"Milagro"	Kim Manners	Story by : John Shiban & Frank Spotnitz; Teleplay by : Chris Carter	April 18, 1999	6ABX18	15.20
136	19	"The Unnatural"	David Duchovny	David Duchovny	April 25, 1999	6ABX20	16.88
137	20	"Three of a Kind"	Bryan Spicer	Vince Gilligan & John Shiban	May 2, 1999	6ABX19	12.94
138	21	"Field Trip"	Kim Manners	Story by : Frank Spotnitz; Teleplay by : John Shiban & Vince Gilligan	May 9, 1999	6ABX21	15.38
139	22	"Biogenesis"‡	Rob Bowman	Chris Carter & Frank Spotnitz	May 16, 1999	6ABX22	15.86

=== Season 7 (1999–2000) ===
No. overall	No. in season	Title	Directed by	Written by	Original release date	Prod. code	U.S. viewers (millions)
140	1	"The Sixth Extinction"‡	Kim Manners	Chris Carter	November 7, 1999	7ABX03	17.82
141	2	"The Sixth Extinction II: Amor Fati"‡	Michael Watkins	David Duchovny & Chris Carter	November 14, 1999	7ABX04	16.15
142	3	"Hungry"	Kim Manners	Vince Gilligan	November 21, 1999	7ABX01	16.17
143	4	"Millennium"	Thomas J. Wright	Vince Gilligan & Frank Spotnitz	November 28, 1999	7ABX05	15.09
144	5	"Rush"	Robert Lieberman	David Amann	December 5, 1999	7ABX06	12.71
145	6	"The Goldberg Variation"	Thomas J. Wright	Jeffrey Bell	December 12, 1999	7ABX02	14.49
146	7	"Orison"	Rob Bowman	Chip Johannessen	January 9, 2000	7ABX07	15.63
147	8	"The Amazing Maleeni"	Thomas J. Wright	Vince Gilligan & John Shiban & Frank Spotnitz	January 16, 2000	7ABX08	16.18
148	9	"Signs and Wonders"	Kim Manners	Jeffrey Bell	January 23, 2000	7ABX09	13.86
149	10	"Sein und Zeit"‡	Michael Watkins	Chris Carter & Frank Spotnitz	February 6, 2000	7ABX10	13.95
150	11	"Closure"‡	Kim Manners	Chris Carter & Frank Spotnitz	February 13, 2000	7ABX11	15.35
151	12	"X-Cops"	Michael Watkins	Vince Gilligan	February 20, 2000	7ABX12	16.56
152	13	"First Person Shooter"	Chris Carter	William Gibson & Tom Maddox	February 27, 2000	7ABX13	15.31
153	14	"Theef"	Kim Manners	Vince Gilligan & John Shiban & Frank Spotnitz	March 12, 2000	7ABX14	11.91
154	15	"En Ami"‡	Rob Bowman	William B. Davis	March 19, 2000	7ABX15	11.99
155	16	"Chimera"	Cliff Bole	David Amann	April 2, 2000	7ABX16	12.89
156	17	"all things"	Gillian Anderson	Gillian Anderson	April 9, 2000	7ABX17	12.18
157	18	"Brand X"	Kim Manners	Steven Maeda & Greg Walker	April 16, 2000	7ABX19	10.81
158	19	"Hollywood A.D."	David Duchovny	David Duchovny	April 30, 2000	7ABX18	12.88
159	20	"Fight Club"	Paul Shapiro	Chris Carter	May 7, 2000	7ABX20	11.70
160	21	"Je Souhaite"	Vince Gilligan	Vince Gilligan	May 14, 2000	7ABX21	12.79
161	22	"Requiem"‡	Kim Manners	Chris Carter	May 21, 2000	7ABX22	15.26

=== Season 8 (2000–01) ===
No. overall	No. in season	Title	Directed by	Written by	Original release date	Prod. code	U.S. viewers (millions)
162	1	"Within"‡	Kim Manners	Chris Carter	November 5, 2000	8ABX01	15.87
163	2	"Without"‡	Kim Manners	Chris Carter	November 12, 2000	8ABX02	15.15
164	3	"Patience"	Chris Carter	Chris Carter	November 19, 2000	8ABX04	13.34
165	4	"Roadrunners"	Rod Hardy	Vince Gilligan	November 26, 2000	8ABX05	13.60
166	5	"Invocation"	Richard Compton	David Amann	December 3, 2000	8ABX06	13.89
167	6	"Redrum"	Peter Markle	Story by : Steven Maeda & Daniel Arkin; Teleplay by : Steven Maeda	December 10, 2000	8ABX03	13.21
168	7	"Via Negativa"	Tony Wharmby	Frank Spotnitz	December 17, 2000	8ABX07	12.37
169	8	"Surekill"	Terrence O'Hara	Greg Walker	January 7, 2001	8ABX09	13.33
170	9	"Salvage"	Rod Hardy	Jeffrey Bell	January 14, 2001	8ABX10	11.69
171	10	"Badlaa"	Tony Wharmby	John Shiban	January 21, 2001	8ABX12	11.87
172	11	"The Gift"‡	Kim Manners	Frank Spotnitz	February 4, 2001	8ABX11	14.58
173	12	"Medusa"	Richard Compton	Frank Spotnitz	February 11, 2001	8ABX13	13.75
174	13	"Per Manum"‡	Kim Manners	Chris Carter & Frank Spotnitz	February 18, 2001	8ABX08	16.10
175	14	"This Is Not Happening"‡	Kim Manners	Chris Carter & Frank Spotnitz	February 25, 2001	8ABX14	16.87
176	15	"Deadalive"‡	Tony Wharmby	Chris Carter & Frank Spotnitz	April 1, 2001	8ABX15	12.57
177	16	"Three Words"‡	Tony Wharmby	Chris Carter & Frank Spotnitz	April 8, 2001	8ABX18	10.46
178	17	"Empedocles"	Barry K. Thomas	Greg Walker	April 22, 2001	8ABX17	12.46
179	18	"Vienen"‡	Rod Hardy	Steven Maeda	April 29, 2001	8ABX16	11.81
180	19	"Alone"	Frank Spotnitz	Frank Spotnitz	May 6, 2001	8ABX19	12.71
181	20	"Essence"‡	Kim Manners	Chris Carter	May 13, 2001	8ABX20	12.75
182	21	"Existence"‡	Kim Manners	Chris Carter	May 20, 2001	8ABX21	14.01

=== Season 9 (2001–02) ===
No. overall	No. in season	Title	Directed by	Written by	Original release date	Prod. code	U.S. viewers (millions)
183	1	"Nothing Important Happened Today"‡	Kim Manners	Chris Carter & Frank Spotnitz	November 11, 2001	9ABX01	10.60
184	2	"Nothing Important Happened Today II"‡	Tony Wharmby	Chris Carter & Frank Spotnitz	November 18, 2001	9ABX02	9.41
185	3	"Dæmonicus"	Frank Spotnitz	Frank Spotnitz	December 2, 2001	9ABX03	8.67
186	4	"4-D"	Tony Wharmby	Steven Maeda	December 9, 2001	9ABX05	8.74
187	5	"Lord of the Flies"	Kim Manners	Thomas Schnauz	December 16, 2001	9ABX06	9.94
188	6	"Trust No 1"‡	Tony Wharmby	Chris Carter & Frank Spotnitz	January 6, 2002	9ABX08	8.35
189	7	"John Doe"	Michelle MacLaren	Vince Gilligan	January 13, 2002	9ABX07	8.67
190	8	"Hellbound"	Kim Manners	David Amann	January 27, 2002	9ABX04	7.78
191	9	"Provenance"‡	Kim Manners	Chris Carter & Frank Spotnitz	March 3, 2002	9ABX10	9.72
192	10	"Providence"‡	Chris Carter	Chris Carter & Frank Spotnitz	March 10, 2002	9ABX11	8.44
193	11	"Audrey Pauley"	Kim Manners	Steven Maeda	March 17, 2002	9ABX13	7.99
194	12	"Underneath"	John Shiban	John Shiban	March 31, 2002	9ABX09	7.29
195	13	"Improbable"	Chris Carter	Chris Carter	April 7, 2002	9ABX14	8.62
196	14	"Scary Monsters"	Dwight Little	Thomas Schnauz	April 14, 2002	9ABX12	8.24
197	15	"Jump the Shark"	Cliff Bole	Vince Gilligan & John Shiban & Frank Spotnitz	April 21, 2002	9ABX15	8.59
198	16	"William"‡	David Duchovny	Story by : David Duchovny & Frank Spotnitz & Chris Carter; Teleplay by : Chris Carter	April 28, 2002	9ABX17	9.68
199	17	"Release"	Kim Manners	Story by : John Shiban & David Amann; Teleplay by : David Amann	May 5, 2002	9ABX16	7.78
200	18	"Sunshine Days"	Vince Gilligan	Vince Gilligan	May 12, 2002	9ABX18	10.33
201 202	19 20	"The Truth"‡	Kim Manners	Chris Carter	May 19, 2002	9ABX19 9ABX20	13.25

=== The X-Files: I Want to Believe (2008) ===
Title	Directed by	Written by	Release date (U.S.)
The X-Files: I Want to Believe	Chris Carter	Frank Spotnitz & Chris Carter	July 25, 2008
Mulder and Scully have both left the FBI, but when an FBI agent is mysteriously kidnapped, and a former priest who has been convicted of being a child molester claims to be experiencing psychic visions of the endangered agent, they reluctantly accept the FBI's request for their paranormal expertise.

=== Season 10 (2016) ===
No. overall	No. in season	Title	Directed by	Written by	Original release date	Prod. code	U.S. viewers (millions)
203	1	"My Struggle"‡	Chris Carter	Chris Carter	January 24, 2016	1AYW01	16.19
204	2	"Founder's Mutation"	James Wong	James Wong	January 25, 2016	1AYW05	9.67
205	3	"Mulder and Scully Meet the Were-Monster"	Darin Morgan	Darin Morgan	February 1, 2016	1AYW03	8.37
206	4	"Home Again"	Glen Morgan	Glen Morgan	February 8, 2016	1AYW02	8.31
207	5	"Babylon"	Chris Carter	Chris Carter	February 15, 2016	1AYW04	7.07
208	6	"My Struggle II"‡	Chris Carter	Story by : Dr. Anne Simon & Dr. Margaret Fearon & Chris Carter; Teleplay by : Chris Carter	February 22, 2016	1AYW06	7.60

=== Season 11 (2018) ===
No. overall	No. in season	Title	Directed by	Written by	Original release date	Prod. code	U.S. viewers (millions)
209	1	"My Struggle III"‡	Chris Carter	Chris Carter	January 3, 2018	2AYW01	5.15
210	2	"This"	Glen Morgan	Glen Morgan	January 10, 2018	2AYW02	3.95
211	3	"Plus One"	Kevin Hooks	Chris Carter	January 17, 2018	2AYW03	3.95
212	4	"The Lost Art of Forehead Sweat"	Darin Morgan	Darin Morgan	January 24, 2018	2AYW04	3.87
213	5	"Ghouli"‡	James Wong	James Wong	January 31, 2018	2AYW05	3.64
214	6	"Kitten"	Carol Banker	Gabe Rotter	February 7, 2018	2AYW06	3.74
215	7	"Rm9sbG93ZXJz" (Note: This is Base64 for "Followers".)	Glen Morgan	Shannon Hamblin & Kristen Cloke	February 28, 2018	2AYW07	3.23
216	8	"Familiar"	Holly Dale	Benjamin Van Allen	March 7, 2018	2AYW09	3.46
217	9	"Nothing Lasts Forever"	James Wong	Karen Nielsen	March 14, 2018	2AYW08	3.01
218	10	"My Struggle IV"‡	Chris Carter	Chris Carter	March 21, 2018	2AYW10	3.43

== See also ==
- The Lone Gunmen (TV series) § Episodes

== Bibliography ==
- Kessenich, Tom (2002). Examination. New York: Trafford Publishing. ISBN 978-1-55369-812-8.
- Lowry, Brian (1995). The Truth is Out There: The Official Guide to the X-Files. Harper Prism. ISBN 978-0-06-105330-6.
- Lowry, Brian (1996). Trust No One: The Official Guide to the X-Files. Harper Prism. ISBN 978-0-06-105353-5.
- Meisler, Andy (1998). I Want to Believe: The Official Guide to the X-Files Volume 3. Harper Prism. ISBN 978-0-06-105386-3.
- Shapiro, Marc (2000). All Things: The Official Guide to the X-Files Volume 6. Harper Prism. ISBN 978-0-06-107611-4.
