= List of accolades received by The X-Files =

List of accolades for The X-Files
Awards and nominations
Award	Wins	Nominations
ACE Eddie Awards	0	2
ACTRA Awards	1	2
ADG Excellence in Production Design Awards	2	3
Aftonbladets TV-pris	6	6
American Society of Cinematographers Awards	2	10
Artios Awards	0	1
ASCAP Film and Television Music Awards	4	4
British Academy Television Awards	1	2
Cinema Audio Society Awards	0	5
Directors Guild of America Awards	0	3
Edgar Awards	0	2
Environmental Media Awards	4	4
Golden Globe Awards	5	12
Golden Reel Awards	1	9
Golden Televizier-Ring Gala	0	1
International Horror Guild Awards	0	2
Jupiter Awards	0	1
Leo Awards	0	1
Make-Up Artists and Hair Stylists Guild Awards	1	2
Monte-Carlo Television Festival	0	1
National Television Awards	1	3
Peabody Awards	1	1
People's Choice Awards	0	1
Primetime Emmy Awards	15	61
Producers Guild of America Awards	1	2
Q Awards	2	12
Satellite Awards	2	9
Saturn Awards	5	27
Screen Actors Guild Awards	2	14
TCA Awards	0	9
Teen Choice Awards	0	1
Telegatto	1	1
TP de Oro	2	2
TV Guide Awards	4	9
TV Land Awards	0	1
Writers Guild of America Awards	0	2
Young Artist Awards	1	2

Totals (Note: Certain award groups do not simply award one winner. They acknowledge several different recipients, have runners-up, and have third place. Since this is a specific recognition and is different from losing an award, runner-up mentions are considered wins in this award tally. For simplification and to avoid errors, each award in this list has been presumed to have had a prior nomination.)
- Wins: 64
- Nominations: 230

This is a list of accolades received by the American science fiction drama television series, The X-Files.

== Accolades ==
Accolades received by The X-Files
Award	Year (Note: The listed year refers to the date of the ceremony, not necessarily the year in which the corresponding season or episode aired)	Category	Nominee(s)	Result	Ref.
ACE Eddie Awards	1997	Best Edited One-Hour Series for Television	Heather MacDougall (for "Unruhe")	Nominated	
ACE Eddie Awards	1998	Best Edited One-Hour Series for Television	Lynne Willingham (for "The Post-Modern Prometheus")	Nominated	
ACTRA Awards	2016	Best Stunt	Lauro David Chartrand-Del Valle, Crystal Dalman, Dean Choe, Scott Nicholson, Mike Mitchell (for "Babylon")	Nominated	
ACTRA Awards	2018	Best Actress	Karin Konoval (for "Plus One")	Won	
ADG Excellence in Production Design Awards	1999	Excellence in Production Design for Television Series	Corey Kaplan, Sandy Getzler, Lauren E. Polizzi, Kevin Kavanaugh	Won	
ADG Excellence in Production Design Awards	2000	Excellence in Production Design for Television Series	Corey Kaplan, Phil Dagort, Sandy Getzler, Steve Miller	Nominated	
ADG Excellence in Production Design Awards	2001	Excellence in Production Design for Television, Single-Camera Series	Corey Kaplan, Phil Dagort, Sandy Getzler, Steve Miller	Won	
Aftonbladets TV-pris	1995	Best Foreign TV Program	The X-Files	Won	
Aftonbladets TV-pris	1996	Best Foreign TV Program	The X-Files	Won	
Aftonbladets TV-pris	1996	Best Foreign TV Personality – Male	David Duchovny	Won	
Aftonbladets TV-pris	1996	Best Foreign TV Personality – Female	Gillian Anderson	Won	
Aftonbladets TV-pris	1997	Best Foreign TV Program	The X-Files	Won	
Aftonbladets TV-pris	1997	Best Foreign TV Personality – Female	Gillian Anderson	Won	
American Society of Cinematographers Awards	1994	Outstanding Achievement in Cinematography in a Movie of the Week or Pilot	Thomas Del Ruth (for "Pilot")	Nominated	
American Society of Cinematographers Awards	1995	Outstanding Achievement in Cinematography in Regular Series	John Bartley (for "Duane Barry")	Nominated	
American Society of Cinematographers Awards	1996	Outstanding Achievement in Cinematography in Regular Series	John Bartley (for "731")	Nominated	
American Society of Cinematographers Awards	1997	Outstanding Achievement in Cinematography in Regular Series	John Bartley (for "Grotesque")	Nominated	
American Society of Cinematographers Awards	1999	Outstanding Achievement in Cinematography in Regular Series	Joel Ransom (for "Travelers")	Nominated	
American Society of Cinematographers Awards	1999	Outstanding Achievement in Cinematography in Regular Series	Bill Roe (for "Drive")	Won	
American Society of Cinematographers Awards	2000	Outstanding Achievement in Cinematography in Regular Series	Bill Roe (for "Agua Mala")	Won	
American Society of Cinematographers Awards	2001	Outstanding Achievement in Cinematography in Regular Series	Bill Roe (for "Patience")	Nominated	
American Society of Cinematographers Awards	2002	Outstanding Achievement in Cinematography in Regular Series	Bill Roe (for "This Is Not Happening")	Nominated	
American Society of Cinematographers Awards	2003	Outstanding Achievement in Cinematography in Regular Series	Bill Roe (for "Release")	Nominated	
Artios Awards	1994	Best Casting for TV, Dramatic Episodic	Rick Millikan, Lynne Carrow	Nominated	
ASCAP Film and Television Music Awards	1996	Top TV Series	Mark Snow	Won	
ASCAP Film and Television Music Awards	1997	Top TV Series	Mark Snow	Won	
ASCAP Film and Television Music Awards	1998	Top TV Series	Mark Snow	Won	
ASCAP Film and Television Music Awards	1999	Top TV Series	Mark Snow	Won	
British Academy Television Awards	1996	Lloyds Bank People's Vote for the Most Popular Television Programme	The X-Files	Won	
British Academy Television Awards	1999	Best International (Programme or Series)	The X-Files (Note: Nominee: Chris Carter)	Nominated	
Cinema Audio Society Awards	1996	Outstanding Achievement in Sound Mixing for Television – Series	Michael T. Williamson, Marti D. Humphrey, Gary D. Rogers (for "Humbug")	Nominated	
Cinema Audio Society Awards	1997	Outstanding Achievement in Sound Mixing for Television – Series	Michael T. Williamson. David John West, Nello Torri, Doug E. Turner (for "Tunguska")	Nominated	
Cinema Audio Society Awards	1998	Outstanding Achievement in Sound Mixing for Television – Series	Michael T. Williamson, David John West, Harry Andronis, Kurt Kassulke (for "The Post-Modern Prometheus")	Nominated	
Cinema Audio Society Awards	2000	Outstanding Achievement in Sound Mixing for Television – Series	Steve Cantamessa, David John West, Harry Andronis, Kurt Kassulke (for "The Unnatural")	Nominated	
Cinema Audio Society Awards	2003	Outstanding Achievement in Sound Mixing for Television – Series	Steve Cantamessa, David John West, Harry Andronis, Brian Harman (for "The Truth")	Nominated	
Directors Guild of America Awards	1996	Outstanding Directorial Achievement in Dramatic Series – Night	Chris Carter (for "The List")	Nominated	
Directors Guild of America Awards	1998	Outstanding Directorial Achievement in Dramatic Series – Night	Chris Carter (for "The Post-Modern Prometheus")	Nominated	
Directors Guild of America Awards	1999	Outstanding Directorial Achievement in Dramatic Series – Night	Chris Carter (for "Triangle")	Nominated	
Edgar Awards	1995	Best Episode in a TV Series	Chris Carter (for "The Erlenmeyer Flask")	Nominated	
Edgar Awards	1996	Best Episode in a TV Series	Darin Morgan (for "Humbug")	Nominated	
Environmental Media Awards	1994	Television Episodic – Drama	"Darkness Falls"	Won	
Environmental Media Awards	1995	Television Episodic – Drama	"Fearful Symmetry"	Won	
Environmental Media Awards	1996	Television Episodic – Drama	"Quagmire"	Won	
Environmental Media Awards	1999	Television Episodic – Drama	"Arcadia"	Won	
Golden Globe Awards	1995	Best Television Series – Drama	The X-Files	Won	
Golden Globe Awards	1996	Best Performance by an Actor in a Television Series – Drama	David Duchovny	Nominated	
Golden Globe Awards	1996	Best Performance by an Actress in a Television Series – Drama	Gillian Anderson	Nominated	
Golden Globe Awards	1997	Best Television Series – Drama	The X-Files	Won	
Golden Globe Awards	1997	Best Performance by an Actor in a Television Series – Drama	David Duchovny	Won	
Golden Globe Awards	1997	Best Performance by an Actress in a Television Series – Drama	Gillian Anderson	Won	
Golden Globe Awards	1998	Best Television Series – Drama	The X-Files	Won	
Golden Globe Awards	1998	Best Performance by an Actor in a Television Series – Drama	David Duchovny	Nominated	
Golden Globe Awards	1998	Best Performance by an Actress in a Television Series – Drama	Gillian Anderson	Nominated	
Golden Globe Awards	1999	Best Television Series – Drama	The X-Files	Nominated	
Golden Globe Awards	1999	Best Performance by an Actor in a Television Series – Drama	David Duchovny	Nominated	
Golden Globe Awards	1999	Best Performance by an Actress in a Television Series – Drama	Gillian Anderson	Nominated	
Golden Reel Awards	1998	Best Sound Editing – Television Episodic – Effects & Foley	Thierry J. Couturier, Stuart Calderon, Ira Leslie, Chris Fradkin, Susan Welsh (for "Tempus Fugit")	Won	
Golden Reel Awards	1999	Best Sound Editing – Television Episodic – Dialogue & ADR		Nominated	
Golden Reel Awards	1999	Best Sound Editing – Television Episodic – Music	Jeff Charbonneau	Nominated	
Golden Reel Awards	2000	Best Sound Editing – Television Episodic – Dialogue & ADR	Thierry J. Couturier, H. Jay Levine, Maciek Malish, James L. Pearson, Gabrielle Gilbert Reeves, Donna Beltz, Mike Goodman (Note: Additional crew: Barbara Harris (voice casting); Steve Cantamessa (production mixer); David John West (re-recording mixer); Debby Ruby-Winsberg, Warren Kleiman (ADR mixers)) (for "The Unnatural")	Nominated	
Golden Reel Awards	2000	Best Sound Editing – Television Episodic – Effects & Foley	Thierry J. Couturier, Cecilia Perna, George Nemzer, Stuart Calderon, Peggy McAffee, Michael Kimball, Susan Welsh, Ira Leslie (Note: Additional crew: Anthony Torretto (assistant sound editors); Michael Salvetta, Gary Marullo (foley artists); David John West, Harry Andronis, Kurt Kassulke (re-recording mixer); Cecilia Perna (foley mixer)) (for "Agua Mala")	Nominated	
Golden Reel Awards	2002	Best Sound Editing in Television – Effects & Foley, Episodic	Harry Andronis, David John West, Susan Welsh, Anthony Torretto, Jackson Schwartz, Debby Ruby-Winsberg (Note: Additional crew: Ray O’Reilly, Diane Greco (foley artists); David John West, Eric Clopein (re-recording mixers)) (for "Dæmonicus")	Nominated	
Golden Reel Awards	2003	Best Sound Editing in Television Episodic – Sound Effects & Foley	David John West, Harry Andronis, Susan Welsh, Anthony Torretto, Jackson Schwartz, Debby Ruby-Winsberg (for "The Truth")	Nominated	
Golden Reel Awards	2019	Outstanding Achievement in Sound Editing – Dialogue and ADR for Episodic Short Form Broadcast Media	Thierry J. Couturier, Xiao'ou Olivia Zhang (for "This")	Nominated	
Golden Reel Awards	2019	Outstanding Achievement in Sound Editing – Sound Effects and Foley for Episodic Short Form Broadcast Media	Thierry J. Couturier, Cormac Funge, Pete Nichols, Gretchen Thoma, Ginger Geary, Sam C. Lewis (for "This")	Nominated	
Golden Televizier-Ring Gala	1998	Silver Televizier-Tulip	The X-Files	Nominated	
International Horror Guild Awards	1999	Best Television	The X-Files	Nominated	
International Horror Guild Awards	2000	Best Television	The X-Files	Nominated	
Jupiter Awards	2017	Best International TV Series	The X-Files	Nominated	
Leo Awards	2016	Best Guest Performance by a Male in a Dramatic Series	Jonathan Whitesell (for "Founder's Mutation")	Nominated	
Make-Up Artists and Hair Stylists Guild Awards	2000	Best Character Make-Up – Television (for a Single Episode of a Regular Series – Sitcom, Drama or Daytime)	Cheri Montesanto, Kevin Westmore (for "Two Fathers" and "One Son")	Nominated	
Make-Up Artists and Hair Stylists Guild Awards	2000	Best Period Make-Up – Television (for a Single Episode of a Regular Series – Sitcom, Drama or Daytime)	Cheri Montesanto, Kevin Westmore, Laverne Munroe (for "Triangle")	Won	
Monte-Carlo Television Festival	2017	Best Drama TV Series	The X-Files	Nominated	
National Television Awards	1996	Most Popular Actor	David Duchovny	Won	
National Television Awards	1996	Most Popular Actress	Gillian Anderson	Nominated	
National Television Awards	1997	Most Popular Actress	Gillian Anderson	Nominated	
Peabody Awards	1997	Honoree (Note: Presented to Fox and Ten Thirteen Productions in association with Twentieth Television)		Honored	
People's Choice Awards	1997	Favorite TV Dramatic Series	The X-Files	Nominated	
Primetime Emmy Awards	1995	Outstanding Drama Series	The X-Files (Note: Nominees: Rob Bowman, Chris Carter, Joseph Patrick Finn, R.W. Goodwin, Howard Gordon, Kim Manners, Glen Morgan, David Nutter, Paul Rabwin, James Wong)	Nominated	
Primetime Emmy Awards	1995	Outstanding Individual Achievement in Writing in a Drama Series	Chris Carter (for "Duane Barry")	Nominated	
Primetime Emmy Awards	1996	Outstanding Drama Series	The X-Files (Note: Nominees: Rob Bowman, Chris Carter, Joseph Patrick Finn, R.W. Goodwin, Howard Gordon, Kim Manners, Paul Rabwin)	Nominated	
Primetime Emmy Awards	1996	Outstanding Lead Actress in a Drama Series	Gillian Anderson (for "Piper Maru")	Nominated	
Primetime Emmy Awards	1996	Outstanding Writing for a Drama Series	Darin Morgan (for "Clyde Bruckman's Final Repose")	Won	
Primetime Emmy Awards	1997	Outstanding Drama Series	The X-Files (Note: Nominees: Rob Bowman, Chris Carter, Joseph Patrick Finn, Vince Gilligan, R.W. Goodwin, Howard Gordon, Ken Horton, Kim Manners, Glen Morgan, Lori Jo Nemhauser, Paul Rabwin, Frank Spotnitz, James Wong)	Nominated	
Primetime Emmy Awards	1997	Outstanding Lead Actor in a Drama Series	David Duchovny (for "Small Potatoes")	Nominated	
Primetime Emmy Awards	1997	Outstanding Lead Actress in a Drama Series	Gillian Anderson (for "Memento Mori")	Won	
Primetime Emmy Awards	1997	Outstanding Directing for a Drama Series	James Wong (for "Musings of a Cigarette Smoking Man")	Nominated	
Primetime Emmy Awards	1997	Outstanding Writing for a Drama Series	Chris Carter, Vince Gilligan, John Shiban, Frank Spotnitz (for "Memento Mori")	Nominated	
Primetime Emmy Awards	1998	Outstanding Drama Series	The X-Files (Note: Nominees: Rob Bowman, Chris Carter, Joseph Patrick Finn, Vince Gilligan, R.W. Goodwin, Ken Horton, Kim Manners, Lori Jo Nemhauser, Frank Spotnitz, Paul Rabwin, John Shiban)	Nominated	
Primetime Emmy Awards	1998	Outstanding Lead Actor in a Drama Series	David Duchovny (for "Redux")	Nominated	
Primetime Emmy Awards	1998	Outstanding Lead Actress in a Drama Series	Gillian Anderson (for "All Souls")	Nominated	
Primetime Emmy Awards	1998	Outstanding Directing for a Drama Series	Chris Carter (for "The Post-Modern Prometheus")	Nominated	
Primetime Emmy Awards	1998	Outstanding Writing for a Drama Series	Chris Carter (for "The Post-Modern Prometheus")	Nominated	
Primetime Emmy Awards	1999	Outstanding Lead Actress in a Drama Series	Gillian Anderson (for "Milagro")	Nominated	
Primetime Creative Arts Emmy Awards	1994	Outstanding Individual Achievement in Graphic Design and Title Sequences	Bruce Bryant, James Castle, Carol Johnsen	Won	
Primetime Creative Arts Emmy Awards	1994	Outstanding Individual Achievement in Main Title Theme Music	Mark Snow	Nominated	
Primetime Creative Arts Emmy Awards	1995	Outstanding Guest Actress in a Drama Series	CCH Pounder (for "Duane Barry")	Nominated	
Primetime Creative Arts Emmy Awards	1995	Outstanding Individual Achievement in Cinematography for a Series	John Bartley (for "One Breath")	Nominated	
Primetime Creative Arts Emmy Awards	1995	Outstanding Individual Achievement in Editing for a Series – Single-Camera Production	Stephen Mark (for "Sleepless")	Nominated	
Primetime Creative Arts Emmy Awards	1995	Outstanding Individual Achievement in Editing for a Series – Single-Camera Production	James Coblentz (for "Duane Barry")	Nominated	
Primetime Creative Arts Emmy Awards	1995	Outstanding Individual Achievement in Sound Editing for a Series	Thierry J. Couturier, Maciek Malish, Christopher B. Reeves, Marty Stein, H. Jay Levine, Stuart Calderon, Michael Kimball, David F. Van Slyke, Susan Welsh, Chris Fradkin, Matthew West, Ira Leslie, Jeff Charbonneau, Debby Ruby-Winsberg, Kitty Malone, Yvonne Preble (for "Duane Barry")	Nominated	
Primetime Creative Arts Emmy Awards	1996	Outstanding Guest Actor in a Drama Series	Peter Boyle (for "Clyde Bruckman's Final Repose")	Won	
Primetime Creative Arts Emmy Awards	1996	Outstanding Art Direction for a Series	Graeme Murray, Shirley Inget (for "Jose Chung's From Outer Space")	Nominated	
Primetime Creative Arts Emmy Awards	1996	Outstanding Cinematography for a Series	John Bartley (for "Grotesque")	Won	
Primetime Creative Arts Emmy Awards	1996	Outstanding Sound Editing for a Series	Thierry J. Couturier, Maciek Malish, Christopher B. Reeves, Mike Goodman, Debby Ruby-Winsberg, Susan Welsh, Michael Kimball, Rick Hinson, Ira Leslie, Marty Stein, Jeff Charbonneau, Kitty Malone, Joseph T. Sabella, Jerry Jacobson, Greg Pusateri (for "Nisei")	Won	
Primetime Creative Arts Emmy Awards	1996	Outstanding Sound Mixing for a Drama Series	Michael T. Williamson, David John West, Nello Torri, Doug E. Turner (for "Nisei")	Won	
Primetime Creative Arts Emmy Awards	1997	Outstanding Art Direction for a Series	Graeme Murray, Shirley Inget, Gary Allen (for "Memento Mori")	Won	
Primetime Creative Arts Emmy Awards	1997	Outstanding Makeup for a Series	Laverne Basham, Toby Lindala (for "Leonard Betts")	Nominated	
Primetime Creative Arts Emmy Awards	1997	Outstanding Music Composition for a Series (Dramatic Underscore)	Mark Snow (for "Paper Hearts")	Nominated	
Primetime Creative Arts Emmy Awards	1997	Outstanding Single-Camera Picture Editing for a Series	Jim Gross (for "Terma")	Nominated	
Primetime Creative Arts Emmy Awards	1997	Outstanding Single-Camera Picture Editing for a Series	Heather MacDougall (for "Tempus Fugit")	Nominated	
Primetime Creative Arts Emmy Awards	1997	Outstanding Sound Editing for a Series	Thierry J. Couturier, Stuart Calderon, Ira Leslie, Maciek Malish, Debby Ruby-Winsberg, Chris Fradkin, H. Jay Levine, Christopher B. Reeves, Susan Welsh, Jeff Charbonneau, Gary Marullo, Michael Salvetta (for "Tempus Fugit")	Won	
Primetime Creative Arts Emmy Awards	1997	Outstanding Sound Mixing for a Drama Series	David John West, Nello Torri, Harry Andronis, Michael T. Williamson (for "Tempus Fugit")	Nominated	
Primetime Creative Arts Emmy Awards	1998	Outstanding Guest Actress in a Drama Series	Veronica Cartwright (for "Patient X")	Nominated	
Primetime Creative Arts Emmy Awards	1998	Outstanding Guest Actress in a Drama Series	Lili Taylor (for "Mind's Eye")	Nominated	
Primetime Creative Arts Emmy Awards	1998	Outstanding Art Direction for a Series	Graeme Murray, Greg Loewen, Shirley Inget (for "The Post-Modern Prometheus")	Won	
Primetime Creative Arts Emmy Awards	1998	Outstanding Cinematography for a Series	Joel Ransom (for "The Post-Modern Prometheus")	Nominated	
Primetime Creative Arts Emmy Awards	1998	Outstanding Makeup for a Series	Laverne Munroe, Pearl Louie, Toby Lindala, Dave Coughtry, Rachel Griffin, Robin Lindala, Leanne Rae Podavin, Brad Proctor, Geoff Redknap, Tony Wohlgemuth, Wayne Dang, Vince Yoshida (for "The Post-Modern Prometheus")	Nominated	
Primetime Creative Arts Emmy Awards	1998	Outstanding Music Composition for a Series (Dramatic Underscore)	Mark Snow (for "The Post-Modern Prometheus")	Nominated	
Primetime Creative Arts Emmy Awards	1998	Outstanding Single-Camera Picture Editing for a Series	Lynne Willingham (for "The Post-Modern Prometheus")	Nominated	
Primetime Creative Arts Emmy Awards	1998	Outstanding Single-Camera Picture Editing for a Series	Heather MacDougall (for "Kill Switch")	Won	
Primetime Creative Arts Emmy Awards	1998	Outstanding Single-Camera Picture Editing for a Series	Casey O. Rohrs (for "Mind's Eye")	Nominated	
Primetime Creative Arts Emmy Awards	1998	Outstanding Sound Editing for a Series	Thierry J. Couturier, Maciek Malish, H. Jay Levine, Gabrielle Gilbert Reeves, Mike Goodman, Ira Leslie, Chris Fradkin, Rick Hinson, Michael Kimball, Jeff Charbonneau, Gary Marullo, Michael Salvetta (for "The Red and the Black")	Nominated	
Primetime Creative Arts Emmy Awards	1998	Outstanding Sound Mixing for a Drama Series	Michael T. Williamson, David John West, Harry Andronis, Kurt Kassulke (for "The Red and the Black")	Nominated	
Primetime Creative Arts Emmy Awards	1999	Outstanding Guest Actress in a Drama Series	Veronica Cartwright (for "Two Fathers" and "One Son")	Nominated	
Primetime Creative Arts Emmy Awards	1999	Outstanding Art Direction for a Series	Corey Kaplan, Lauren E. Polizzi, Sandy Getzler, Timothy Stepeck (for "One Son")	Nominated	
Primetime Creative Arts Emmy Awards	1999	Outstanding Cinematography for a Series	Bill Roe (for "The Unnatural")	Nominated	
Primetime Creative Arts Emmy Awards	1999	Outstanding Makeup for a Series	Cheri Montesanto, Laverne Munroe, John Vulich, Kevin Westmore, Greg Funk, John Wheaton, Mark Shostrom, Rick Stratton, Jake Garber, Craig Reardon, Fionagh Cush, Steve LaPorte, Kevin Haney, Jane Aull, Perri Sorel, Jeanne Van Phue, Julie Socash (for "Two Fathers" and "One Son")	Won	
Primetime Creative Arts Emmy Awards	1999	Outstanding Music Composition for a Series (Dramatic Underscore)	Mark Snow (for "S.R. 819")	Nominated	
Primetime Creative Arts Emmy Awards	1999	Outstanding Single-Camera Picture Editing for a Series	Heather MacDougall (for "S.R. 819")	Nominated	
Primetime Creative Arts Emmy Awards	1999	Outstanding Sound Editing for a Series	Thierry J. Couturier, Stuart Calderon, Mike Goodman, H. Jay Levine, Maciek Malish, George Nemzer, Cecilia Perna, Christopher B. Reeves, Gabrielle Gilbert Reeves, Jeff Charbonneau, Gary Marullo, Michael Salvetta (for "Triangle")	Nominated	
Primetime Creative Arts Emmy Awards	2000	Outstanding Makeup for a Series	Cheri Montesanto, Kevin Westmore, Laverne Munroe, Greg Funk, Cindy J. Williams (for "Theef")	Won	
Primetime Creative Arts Emmy Awards	2000	Outstanding Music Composition for a Series (Dramatic Underscore)	Mark Snow (for "Theef")	Nominated	
Primetime Creative Arts Emmy Awards	2000	Outstanding Sound Editing for a Series	Thierry J. Couturier, Cecilia Perna, Debby Ruby-Winsberg, Donna Beltz, H. Jay Levine, Ken Gladden, Michael Kimball, Stuart Calderon, Susan Welsh, Jeff Charbonneau, Michael Salvetta, Sharon Michaels (for "First Person Shooter")	Nominated	
Primetime Creative Arts Emmy Awards	2000	Outstanding Sound Mixing for a Drama Series	Steve Cantamessa, David John West, Harry Andronis, Ray O'Reilly (for "First Person Shooter")	Won	
Primetime Creative Arts Emmy Awards	2000	Outstanding Special Visual Effects for a Series	Bill Millar, Deena Burkett, Monique Klauer, Don Greenberg (for "Rush")	Nominated	
Primetime Creative Arts Emmy Awards	2000	Outstanding Special Visual Effects for a Series	Bill Millar, Deena Burkett, Monique Klauer, Don Greenberg, Jeff Zaman, Steven J. Scott, Steve Strassburger, Cory Strassburger (for "First Person Shooter")	Won	
Primetime Creative Arts Emmy Awards	2001	Outstanding Cinematography for a Single-Camera Series	Bill Roe (for "This Is Not Happening")	Nominated	
Primetime Creative Arts Emmy Awards	2002	Outstanding Music Composition for a Series (Dramatic Underscore)	Mark Snow (for "The Truth")	Nominated	
Producers Guild of America Awards	1998	Outstanding Producer of Episodic Television	Chris Carter, R.W. Goodwin, Howard Gordon, Frank Sponitz, Joseph Patrick Finn, Kim Manners, Paul Rabwin, Rob Bowman, Lori Jo Nemhauser, John Shiban, Vince Gilligan, Ken Horton	Nominated	
Producers Guild of America Awards	1999	Most Promising Producer in Television	Chris Carter (Note: Shared with Millennium)	Won	
Q Awards	1994	Best Actress in a Quality Drama Series	Gillian Anderson	Nominated	
Q Awards	1995	Best Quality Drama Series	The X-Files	Nominated	
Q Awards	1995	Best Actor in a Quality Drama Series	David Duchovny	Nominated	
Q Awards	1995	Best Actress in a Quality Drama Series	Gillian Anderson	Nominated	
Q Awards	1996	Best Actress in a Quality Drama Series	Gillian Anderson	Nominated	
Q Awards	1997	Best Quality Drama Series	The X-Files	Nominated	
Q Awards	1997	Best Actor in a Quality Drama Series	David Duchovny	Nominated	
Q Awards	1997	Best Actress in a Quality Drama Series	Gillian Anderson	Nominated	
Q Awards	1997	Best Recurring Player	Mitch Pileggi	Nominated	
Q Awards	1998	Best Quality Drama Series	The X-Files	Nominated	
Q Awards	1998	Best Actress in a Quality Drama Series	Gillian Anderson	Won	
Q Awards	1999	Best Actress in a Quality Drama Series	Gillian Anderson	Won	
Satellite Awards	1997	Best Television Series, Drama	The X-Files	Won	
Satellite Awards	1997	Best Actor in a Series, Drama	David Duchovny	Won	
Satellite Awards	1997	Best Actress in a Series, Drama	Gillian Anderson	Nominated	
Satellite Awards	1998	Best Television Series, Drama	The X-Files	Nominated	
Satellite Awards	1998	Best Actor in a Series, Drama	David Duchovny	Nominated	
Satellite Awards	1998	Best Actress in a Series, Drama	Gillian Anderson	Nominated	
Satellite Awards	1999	Best Television Series, Drama	The X-Files	Nominated	
Satellite Awards	1999	Best Actress in a Series, Drama	Gillian Anderson	Nominated	
Satellite Awards	2001	Best Actress in a Series, Drama	Gillian Anderson	Nominated	
Saturn Awards	1994	Best Genre Television Series	The X-Files	Nominated	
Saturn Awards	1995	Best Genre Television Series	The X-Files	Won	
Saturn Awards	1997	Best Genre Television Series	The X-Files	Won	
Saturn Awards	1997	Best Genre Television Actor	David Duchovny	Nominated	
Saturn Awards	1997	Best Genre Television Actress	Gillian Anderson	Won	
Saturn Awards	1998	Best Genre Television Series	The X-Files	Nominated	
Saturn Awards	1998	Best Genre Television Actor	David Duchovny	Nominated	
Saturn Awards	1998	Best Genre Television Actress	Gillian Anderson	Nominated	
Saturn Awards	1999	Best Genre Television Series	The X-Files	Won	
Saturn Awards	1999	Best Genre Television Actor	David Duchovny	Nominated	
Saturn Awards	1999	Best Genre Television Actress	Gillian Anderson	Nominated	
Saturn Awards	2000	Best Network Television Series	The X-Files	Nominated	
Saturn Awards	2000	Best Actress on Television	Gillian Anderson	Nominated	
Saturn Awards	2001	Best Network Television Series	The X-Files	Nominated	
Saturn Awards	2001	Best Actor on Television	Robert Patrick	Won	
Saturn Awards	2001	Best Actress on Television	Gillian Anderson	Nominated	
Saturn Awards	2002	Best Network Television Series	The X-Files	Nominated	
Saturn Awards	2002	Best Actor on Television	Robert Patrick	Nominated	
Saturn Awards	2002	Best Actress on Television	Gillian Anderson	Nominated	
Saturn Awards	2002	Best Supporting Actress on Television	Annabeth Gish	Nominated	
Saturn Awards	2003	Best DVD TV Programming Release	The X-Files (for Seasons 5–6)	Nominated	
Saturn Awards	2016	Best Science Fiction Television Series	The X-Files	Nominated	
Saturn Awards	2016	Best Actor on Television	David Duchovny	Nominated	
Saturn Awards	2016	Best Actress on Television	Gillian Anderson	Nominated	
Saturn Awards	2016	Best DVD or Blu-ray Television Release	The X-Files: The Collector's Set	Nominated	
Saturn Awards	2018	Best Science Fiction Television Series	The X-Files	Nominated	
Saturn Awards	2018	Best Actress on Television	Gillian Anderson	Nominated	
Screen Actors Guild Awards	1996	Outstanding Performance by a Male Actor in a Drama Series	David Duchovny	Nominated	
Screen Actors Guild Awards	1996	Outstanding Performance by a Female Actor in a Drama Series	Gillian Anderson	Won	
Screen Actors Guild Awards	1997	Outstanding Performance by a Male Actor in a Drama Series	David Duchovny	Nominated	
Screen Actors Guild Awards	1997	Outstanding Performance by a Female Actor in a Drama Series	Gillian Anderson	Won	
Screen Actors Guild Awards	1997	Outstanding Performance by an Ensemble in a Drama Series	Gillian Anderson, William B. Davis, David Duchovny, Mitch Pileggi, Steven Williams	Nominated	
Screen Actors Guild Awards	1998	Outstanding Performance by a Male Actor in a Drama Series	David Duchovny	Nominated	
Screen Actors Guild Awards	1998	Outstanding Performance by a Female Actor in a Drama Series	Gillian Anderson	Nominated	
Screen Actors Guild Awards	1998	Outstanding Performance by an Ensemble in a Drama Series	Gillian Anderson, William B. Davis, David Duchovny, Mitch Pileggi	Nominated	
Screen Actors Guild Awards	1999	Outstanding Performance by a Male Actor in a Drama Series	David Duchovny	Nominated	
Screen Actors Guild Awards	1999	Outstanding Performance by a Female Actor in a Drama Series	Gillian Anderson	Nominated	
Screen Actors Guild Awards	1999	Outstanding Performance by an Ensemble in a Drama Series	Gillian Anderson, William B. Davis, David Duchovny, Chris Owens, James Pickens Jr., Mitch Pileggi	Nominated	
Screen Actors Guild Awards	2000	Outstanding Performance by a Male Actor in a Drama Series	David Duchovny	Nominated	
Screen Actors Guild Awards	2000	Outstanding Performance by a Female Actor in a Drama Series	Gillian Anderson	Nominated	
Screen Actors Guild Awards	2001	Outstanding Performance by a Female Actor in a Drama Series	Gillian Anderson	Nominated	
TCA Awards	1994	Outstanding Achievement in Drama	The X-Files	Nominated	
TCA Awards	1995	Program of the Year	The X-Files	Nominated	
TCA Awards	1995	Outstanding Achievement in Drama	The X-Files	Nominated	
TCA Awards	1996	Outstanding Achievement in Drama	The X-Files	Nominated	
TCA Awards	1997	Program of the Year	The X-Files	Nominated	
TCA Awards	1997	Outstanding Achievement in Drama	The X-Files	Nominated	
TCA Awards	1997	Individual Achievement in Drama	David Duchovny	Nominated	
TCA Awards	1997	Individual Achievement in Drama	Gillian Anderson	Nominated	
TCA Awards	1998	Outstanding Achievement in Drama	The X-Files	Nominated	
Teen Choice Awards	1999	TV – Choice Drama	The X-Files	Nominated	
Telegatto	1996	Best Foreign TV Series	The X-Files	Won	
TP de Oro	1996	Best Foreign Series	The X-Files	Won	
TP de Oro	1997	Best Foreign Series	The X-Files	Won	
TV Guide Awards	1993	Favorite Sci-Fi/Fantasy Show	The X-Files	Won	
TV Guide Awards	1993	Actor of the Year in a New Series	David Duchovny	Won	
TV Guide Awards	1993	Actress of the Year in a New Series	Gillian Anderson	Won	
TV Guide Awards	1999	Favorite Drama Series	The X-Files	Nominated	
TV Guide Awards	1999	Favorite Actor in a Drama Series	David Duchovny	Won	
TV Guide Awards	1999	Favorite Actress in a Drama Series	Gillian Anderson	Nominated	
TV Guide Awards	2000	Favorite Sci-Fi/Fantasy Show	The X-Files	Nominated	
TV Guide Awards	2000	Favorite Actor in a Drama Series	David Duchovny	Nominated	
TV Guide Awards	2000	Favorite Actress in a Drama Series	Gillian Anderson	Nominated	
TV Land Awards	2007	The "Hey! It's...!" Award (Favorite Cameo or Guest Star)	Jodie Foster	Nominated	
Writers Guild of America Awards	1996	Television: Episodic Drama	Chris Carter (for "Duane Barry")	Nominated	
Writers Guild of America Awards	1997	Television: Episodic Drama	Darin Morgan (for "Clyde Bruckman's Final Repose")	Nominated	
Young Artist Awards	2000	Best Performance in a TV Drama Series – Young Actor Age Ten and Under	Jeffrey Schoeny	Nominated	
Young Artist Awards	2003	Best Performance in a TV Comedy or Drama Series – Guest Starring Young Actor Age Ten or Younger	Gavin Fink	Won	
