= Brad Follmer =

Fictional character from The X-Files

- The X-Files character
- Cary Elwes as Brad Follmer
- First appearance: "Nothing Important; Happened Today"
- Last appearance: "Release"
- Portrayed by: Cary Elwes

In-universe information
- Occupation: FBI Assistant Director
- Birthname: Brad D. Follmer
- Duration: 2001-2002
- Seasons: 9

FBI Assistant Director Brad D. Follmer is a fictional character in the American Fox television series The X-Files, a science fiction series about a government conspiracy to hide or deny the truth of Alien existence. Follmer was introduced during the ninth season of the show, as an ex-lover to main character Monica Reyes (Annabeth Gish). Follmer was portrayed by British actor Cary Elwes.

Federal Bureau of Investigation Assistant Director Follmer made his first appearance in the ninth season episode "Nothing Important Happened Today" (2001). At the start of the season, Follmer was unfriendly towards John Doggett (Robert Patrick) because of his case against Alvin Kersh, the Deputy Director of the FBI. In time, however, he came to respect him.

== Character arc ==
Follmer was an Assistant Director at the FBI. He had a romantic history with Monica Reyes that he briefly brought up while trying to keep her away from the X-files. His true motives were more political in nature and part of his sycophancy to Alvin Kersh. He did not believe in the X-files and deliberately showed disrespect to John Doggett by calling him "Mr. Doggett" instead of "Agent".

In 2002, new evidence concerning the murder of Luke Doggett came to light. Doggett sought Follmer's assistance because he had worked against organized crime in New York City before coming to Washington. Reyes, however, recalled seeing Follmer accept a bribe from a mobster. Although he tried to play the event off as him paying an informant (at which he nearly succeeded), the truth was as Reyes suspected: Follmer was crooked. Once the truth of Luke's fate was revealed, Follmer killed the mobster who had nevertheless threatened blackmail concerning Follmer's bribe acceptance. Follmer's future at the FBI was left unresolved, although he most likely faced criminal charges for his actions.

== Conceptual history ==
When creating the character, Chris Carter, one of the executive producers of The X-Files, personally wanted British actor Cary Elwes in the role. Elwes won the role after an audition with Annabeth Gish on August 8, 2001. He was chosen because of "the dynamic" and "the energy between the two of them." Along with announcing the character, he said that the character would only appear in six episodes. Carter named the character Brad Follmer after his personal assistant during seasons 8 and 9.

"He is so much different than Doggett, he's so much different than Mulder. He is a person that is physically attractive, terrific actor, and has a kind of quality that we saw we could use, which was, I don't want to say devious, but there is something going on behind Cary's eyes."
— Carter talking about the character of Follmer and portraying actor Elwes.

When creating the character, Elwes did not want the character to be looked as "good or bad", even having discussing it with Carter and Frank Spotnitz, another executive producer of the show. The producers and actors have instead labeled him as "ambiguous", and a man who wants to see "evidence through logic" and not superstition. When describing his character to The Hollywood Reporter, Elwes said he "is a guy who is a little more buttoned up, a little more polished; he represents a different kind of FBI."

There were two reasons for creating the character of Follmer, the first being when making Monica Reyes (Annabeth Gish) became a main character in the ninth season, they decided to provide a love interest for the character. When introducing Follmer to the show, they wanted to strengthen John Doggett's (Robert Patrick) and Reyes relationship. The second reason was that they wanted to create a character different from Doggett; according to John Shiban, they wanted from the start to have a character who was basically "anti-Doggett".

== Reception ==
John Sellers from Entertainment Weekly reacted overall positive when it was confirmed that Cary Elwes would become a recurring guest actor. Marisa Guthrie from the Boston Herald said Elwes was "fine" as Follmer. Michigan Daily reviewer Christian Smith called the character "unreadable". An unnamed staff writer of Airlock Alpha felt that Elwes performance was "forced," concluding his review of Follmer that Elwes did not feel "comfortable with his character." An unnamed reviewer from Critical Myth felt Follmer's dialogue in the season premiere, "Nothing Important Happened Today", especially the scene at the bar did not "make any sense." While another review from the same site, felt that Follmer's "characterization" was much "stronger" in "4-D" than in the season premiere.
