= 4-D (The X-Files) =

- The X-Files episode
- Episode no.: Season 9 Episode 4
- Directed by: Tony Wharmby
- Written by: Steven Maeda
- Production code: 9ABX05
- Original air date: December 9, 2001
- Running time: 44 minutes

Guest appearances
- Cary Elwes as Brad Follmer; Gil Colon as Agent Rice; Dylan Haggerty as Erwin Timothy Lukesh; Ming Lo as Doctor Kim; Angela Paton as Miriam Lukesh

Episode chronology
← Previous "Dæmonicus"	Next → "Lord of the Flies"
- The X-Files season 9

"4-D" is the fourth episode of the ninth season and the 186th episode overall of the American science fiction television series The X-Files. The episode first aired in the United States on December 9, 2001, on the Fox network. It was written by Steven Maeda and directed by Tony Wharmby. The episode is a "monster-of-the-week" episode, a stand-alone plot which is unconnected to the mythology, or overarching fictional history, of The X-Files. The episode earned a Nielsen rating of 5.1 and was viewed by 5.38 million households. It received mixed to positive reviews from television critics.

The show centers on FBI special agents who work on cases linked to the paranormal, called X-Files; this season focuses on the investigations of John Doggett (Robert Patrick), Monica Reyes (Annabeth Gish), and Dana Scully (Gillian Anderson). In this episode, a vicious murderer named Erwin Lukesh, capable of jumping between parallel universes, shoots Doggett using Reyes' gun. Brad Follmer opens an investigation to figure out the truth. They eventually deduce that Lukesh is the real murderer.

Maeda wrote the episode after being inspired by the situation of a real-life French journalist, Jean-Dominique Bauby, who had been paralyzed and could only communicate by blinking his left eyelid. The character of Lukesh was in part inspired by Alfred Hitchcock's Psycho and was created by Maeda in the hopes that he would go on to be a memorable villain. Effects expert Mat Beck created the unique visual sequence that showed Doggett and Lukesh traveling between the different universes. To create the effect of a parallel universe, every scene in the episode's teaser was flipped so that the mirror image was shown.

== Plot ==
Monica Reyes (Annabeth Gish) monitors Erwin Lukesh, a suspected serial killer who cuts out his victims' tongues. While pursuing him, Reyes goes into an apartment building and is attacked by Lukesh with a razor. John Doggett (Robert Patrick), observes the pursuit electronically and hears a scream. He rushes to help Reyes and finds her dying, her throat cut. Doggett chases Lukesh into an alleyway, where the killer seemingly vanishes. Lukesh then appears behind Doggett and fires at him with Reyes' gun.

The setting then changes; Doggett arrives at Reyes' new apartment with a housewarming gift. Neither seems to be aware of the previous events. Reyes then receives a phone call from Walter Skinner (Mitch Pileggi), who informs her that Doggett has been shot and is being taken to the hospital. Reyes tells Skinner that Doggett is in her apartment, but then finds that he has vanished. The FBI matches the bullet surgically removed from Doggett with Reyes' gun and she is questioned by Brad Follmer (Cary Elwes), but she insists that Doggett was with her at the time of the shooting. Meanwhile, Lukesh watches the interrogation and identifies Reyes as the shooter.

Doggett regains consciousness, but is breathing with the help of a respirator. Meanwhile, Lukesh goes to his apartment where he lives with his disabled mother. As he prepares to fix her lunch, he goes to his freezer and pulls out a bag containing a human tongue, intending to surreptitiously feeding it to her, as he has many times before. Reyes performs a background check on Lukesh, and becomes convinced that he is in fact responsible for the shooting. Reyes goes to Doggett, and through a computer setup that enables him to tap out words on a screen, Doggett tells her that Lukesh shot him but that Doggett also saw her with her throat cut.

Lukesh then returns to the alleyway where Doggett was shot and vanishes. Based on the contradictory evidence, Reyes concludes that Lukesh can travel between parallel universes in order to kill. She also concludes that the unharmed Doggett disappeared because two versions of the same person cannot exist in the same universe. Follmer and Skinner question Lukesh, who becomes agitated when his mother is mentioned. Noting this, Skinner decides to hint that his mother will be questioned, which leads Lukesh to become more uncomfortable. Lukesh returns home to find his mother has found the gun with which he shot Doggett. After she threatens to talk to the FBI, Lukesh kills her.

Doggett tells Reyes that, in order to resolve the situation, she must turn off his respirator and allow him to die, but she refuses. Suspecting that Lukesh plans to kill Reyes next, Skinner convinces Reyes to go back to her apartment while he, Scully, and Follmer monitor her. She returns and is attacked by Lukesh. The team rush to her aid and Follmer shoots Lukesh in the head, killing him. Reyes then returns to the hospital, closing her eyes as she shuts off Doggett's respirator. As she opens her eyes, the scene changes back to her apartment at the moment Doggett had disappeared earlier. Reyes, stunned and fighting back tears, embraces Doggett as he, evidently unaware of any of the previous events, asks her what is wrong.

== Production ==
=== Writing ===
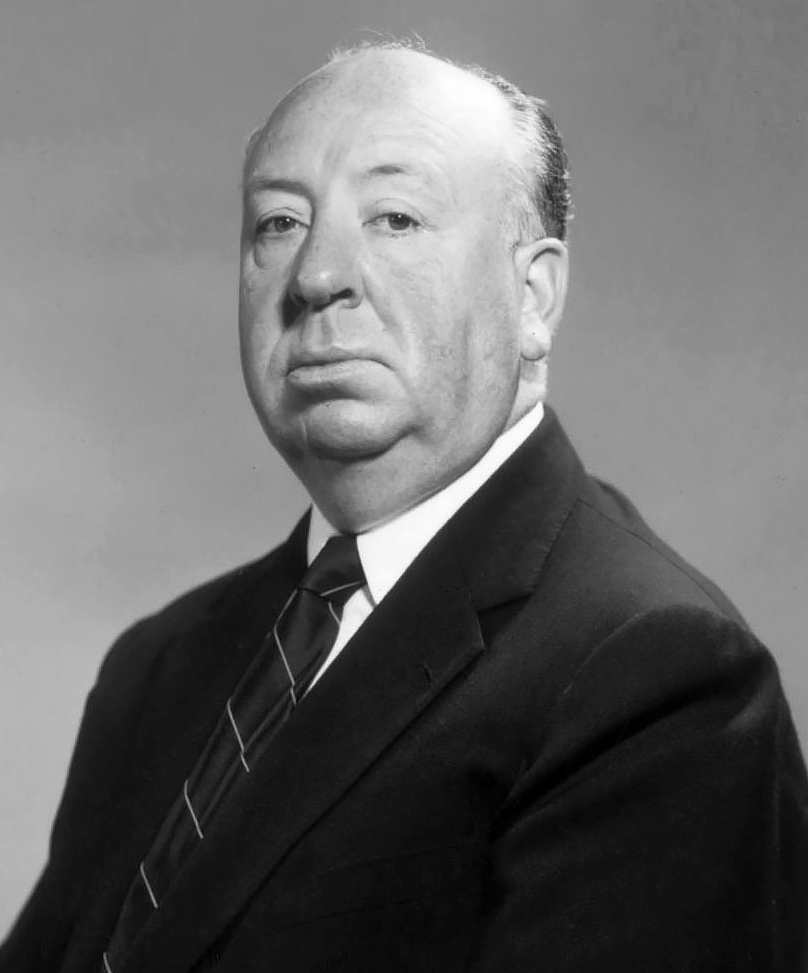
The episode's villain, Lukesh, was inspired by Alfred Hitchcock's 1960 film Psycho.

Writer Steven Maeda had previously written the eighth season episodes "Redrum" and "Vienen"; due to their success, Maeda was asked to pen a ninth season standalone episode. His efforts were hampered by the fact that, due to the departure of David Duchovny, the show had changed considerably. Maeda was inspired to write the episode after learning the story of a French journalist named Jean-Dominique Bauby, who had been paralyzed and could only communicate by blinking his left eyelid. Maeda thought the ailment was interesting and initially wanted to give it to a guest character for this purpose. However, he eventually felt it would be more successful if it affected a regular character, such as Doggett. Maeda employed the theory of parallel universes in order to explain the logistics of the episode. The character of Lukesh was in part inspired by Alfred Hitchcock's 1960 film Psycho. Maeda later noted that he wished to create a villain that would be as memorable as other antagonists in The X-Files, such as Eugene Victor Tooms and The Flukeman.

"4-D" expounded upon the budding relationship between Doggett and Reyes. Most of the two's romantic interactions were limited to "flirtatious undercurrents" because, according to Annabeth Gish, series creator Chris Carter "was never big on the flamboyant big performances." Robert Patrick later claimed that he came up with the scene in which Reyes shaves a wounded Doggett. He noted, "I'd read The Diving Bell and the Butterfly, and I believe there's a part of that in the book where the character gets shaved, and I thought, 'Wow, that's really an intimate kind of moment.'"

=== Effects and cultural references ===
Effects expert Mat Beck was instructed to create a visual sequence that showed Doggett and Lukesh traveling between the different universes. Various effects were tested, including characters disappearing into black holes as well as phasing through the air in a more "exaggerated" and "watery" way. Beck ultimately decided to use a combination of both effects. Separate shots of a morphing scene were taken: one of the actors, and one of the background. Beck then used software to morph the two together to make it appear as if they had vanished. Later, artistic touches were added in post-production editing to give a more futuristic effect.

To create the effect of a parallel universe, every scene in the episode's teaser was flipped so that the mirror image was shown. In order to render words correctly, letters had to be re-written backwards so that they yielded the correct spelling. Monica Reyes' Georgetown apartment address is 67 Bennett Avenue. This is a reference to Rod Serling's address in Binghamton, New York. Furthermore, her apartment number 6, is a reference to Patrick McGoohan's number in the 1967 television series, The Prisoner.

== Reception ==
=== Ratings ===
"4-D" first aired in the United States on December 9, 2001. The episode earned a Nielsen household rating of 5.1, meaning that it was seen by 5.1% of the nation's estimated households and was viewed by 5.38 million households. (Note: At the time of airing, the estimated number of households was 105.5 million. Thus, 5.1 percent of 105.5 million is 5.38 million households.) "4-D" was the 62nd most watched episode of television that aired during the week ending December 9. The episode was later broadcast in the United Kingdom on BBC One on November 25, 2002.

=== Reviews ===
"4-D" received mixed to positive reviews from critics. Robert Shearman and Lars Pearson, in their book Wanting to Believe: A Critical Guide to The X-Files, Millennium & The Lone Gunmen, rated the episode four stars out of five. The two noted that, while the episode's premise "doesn't seem as well thought through" as Maeda's past efforts, "4-D" is "worth it". Shearman and Pearson concluded that the episode "earns its stripes by at last restoring to the series a pulse." Furthermore, they praised Gish's performance, noting that she "finally [is] given a showcase that makes Reyes so much more than a New Age fanatic". Christina Urban, in an editorial review of the ninth season for Barnes & Noble, praised the episode, calling it "by far the best of the season". Jessica Morgan of Television Without Pity awarded the episode a "B". Morgan slightly criticized the episode's resolution, writing that it "explained nothing. I mean, how do these other universes work?" In a season review, Michelle Kung from Entertainment Weekly wrote that "4-D" was one of the few ninth-season episodes "worthy" of praise, but that it was overshadowed by the show's "ludicrous conspiracy plots".

Other reviews were more mixed. Zack Handlen of The A.V. Club gave the episode a "C" and called it a "mediocre to bad hour of television", but one that could have been better had more effort been applied to it. Handlen was particularly critical of the editing, structure, and sense of urgency. He wrote that "'4-D' shows what happens when this creative team has a legitimately cool concept: it wastes the opportunity." M.A. Crang, in his book Denying the Truth: Revisiting The X-Files after 9/11, felt that the interactions between Robert Patrick and Annabeth Gish were the "highlights" of the episode, but he was critical of the ending for wrapping things up "far too conveniently."

== Bibliography ==
- Hurwitz, Matt; Knowles, Chris (2008). The Complete X-Files. Insight Editions. ISBN 978-1933784809.
- Shearman, Robert; Pearson, Lars (2009). Wanting to Believe: A Critical Guide to The X-Files, Millennium & The Lone Gunmen. Mad Norwegian Press. ISBN 978-0975944691.
