= Nothing Important Happened Today =

- The X-Files episodes
- Episode nos.: Season 9 Episodes 1 & 2
- Directed by: Kim Manners; Tony Wharmby
- Written by: Chris Carter; Frank Spotnitz
- Production codes: 9ABX01; 9ABX02
- Original air dates: November 11, 2001; November 18, 2001
- Running time: 44 minutes (per episode)

Guest appearances
- James Pickens, Jr. as Alvin Kersh; Sheila Larken as Margaret Scully; Bruce Harwood as John Fitzgerald Byers; Tom Braidwood as Melvin Frohike; Dean Haglund as Richard Langly; Adam Baldwin as Knowle Rohrer; Cary Elwes as Brad Follmer; Various as Baby William; Lucy Lawless as Shannon McMahon; Nicholas Walker as Carl Wormus; John Casino as Roland McFarland; Jane Yamamoto as News Anchor

Episode chronology
| ← Previous "Existence" | Next → "Dæmonicus" |
- The X-Files season 9

"Nothing Important Happened Today" refers to the two premiere episodes of the ninth season of the science fiction television series The X-Files. Part 1 first aired on November 11 and Part 2 aired on November 18, 2001, on Fox in the United States. The episodes were written by executive producers Chris Carter and Frank Spotnitz. "Nothing Important Happened Today I" was directed by Kim Manners and "Nothing Important Happened Today II" was directed by Tony Wharmby. The episode helped to explore the series' overarching mythology and earned a Nielsen rating of 6.5 and was viewed by 10.6 million viewers, whereas the second part earned a rating of 5.9 and was viewed by 9.4 million viewers. Critical reception to the episode was largely mixed.

The show centers on FBI special agents who work on cases linked to the paranormal, called X-Files; this season focuses on the investigations of John Doggett (Robert Patrick), Monica Reyes (Annabeth Gish), and Dana Scully (Gillian Anderson).

The episodes introduced both the story arc about baby William, which would continue to develop throughout the ninth season. Part 1 deals with the investigation of Deputy Director Alvin Kersh by special agent John Doggett (Robert Patrick) and Doggett's related investigation into the death of EPA official Carl Wormus. In Part 2, Scully, Reyes, and Doggett are led to a ship, where they find evidence of experimentation on human embryos.

The episode was supposed to be the first appearance of recurring regular Lucy Lawless as Shannon McMahon, a female Super Soldier, but Lawless' high-risk pregnancy prevented her from returning to the show after these episodes. These episodes marked, however, the first appearance of recurring regular, Cary Elwes as FBI Assistant Director Brad Follmer. The phrase "nothing important happened today" comes from King George III's supposed diary entry on 4 July 1776, the same day that the United States declared Independence from Great Britain.

== Plot ==
=== Nothing Important Happened Today ===
Carl Wormus, an EPA official, picks up a beautiful woman, Shannon McMahon (Lucy Lawless), in a Baltimore bar. While he is driving her home, she forces the car off a bridge and holds Wormus underwater until he drowns. Two days after Dana Scully's (Gillian Anderson) son was born, Monica Reyes (Annabeth Gish) meets FBI Assistant Director Brad Follmer (Cary Elwes) in his office, where he hands her two videotapes that apparently disprove the events John Doggett (Robert Patrick) has reported. Doggett goes to Fox Mulder's apartment to consult him, but finds it empty. Meanwhile, McMahon surfaces at a water reclamation plant and drowns a worker there.

Scully refuses to disclose the circumstances of Mulder's departure to Doggett. Meanwhile, Assistant Director Walter Skinner urges him to drop his investigation of Deputy Director Alvin Kersh's (James Pickens, Jr.) actions against the X-Files. Doggett tries to contact some of his old friends from the Marine Corps to find out what happened to Knowle Rohrer (Adam Baldwin); one of them turns out to be McMahon. Meanwhile, at FBI headquarters, an unseen figure slips Wormus' obituary to Reyes. Scully's baby causes the mobile of his crib to spin without touching it. Scully is shocked, contacts Doggett, and tells him to continue his investigation. Scully also performs an autopsy on Wormus' body, where she finds fingerprints on his ankle. After leaving, Scully and Reyes see McMahon, who removes the body from the morgue. Follmer, whom Kersh has ordered to rein in Doggett, arrives at the scene and accuses Scully and Reyes of moving the body.

The Lone Gunmen find that Wormus had been receiving data from Roland McFarland, the drowned reclamation worker. Doggett breaks into McFarland's office with Skinner and finds files on monochloramine, a mutation-inducing chemical, before Follmer arrives. Doggett slips into a filtration tank to hide, but is pulled deep underwater by McMahon.

=== Nothing Important Happened Today II ===
The naval captain (Ryan Cutrona) delivers a communication to Dr. Nordlinger (Jeff Austin), who orders the vessel returned to its base. Follmer leaves the water reclamation facility after failing to spot Doggett, who is still underwater; McMahon keeps him alive by passing air from her lungs into his. Back at FBI headquarters, Reyes is warned by Follmer to distance herself from Doggett and his investigation of Kersh. Reyes believes that Follmer simply wants to force Doggett out of the FBI and storms out of the office.

Doggett wakes up at his home to find McMahon, who tells him that both she and Knowle Rohrer are invulnerable Super Soldiers developed by a military program. Doggett calls Scully to his house, and McMahon tells them that the program is to be expanded by adding chloramine to the water supply. Meanwhile, at the ship, now docked in Baltimore, the captain attempts to call Wormus. Rohrer approaches the captain, informing him that he is now second-in-command and demanding information on the vessel's mission. The body of the original officer is found in the water nearby.

Scully examines McMahon and finds her to be physically normal. Doggett is then suspended by Kersh and Follmer. Reyes tries to find out more about McMahon's history and learns that she is a Justice Department employee who had been contacted by Wormus and McFarland in their attempts to expose the plans to contaminate the water supply. The Lone Gunmen intercept the captain's call to Wormus, on which Rohrer is eavesdropping. The captain then pulls a gun on the Navy Seal guarding the lab, demanding that Nordlinger surrender the project's data. He does not notice Rohrer creeping up behind him.

Scully, Reyes and Doggett go to the ship, where they are confronted by Rohrer. Just as Rohrer is about to crush Doggett's skull, he is decapitated by McMahon. Rohrer is presumed dead, but soon awakens and stabs McMahon. Both bodies tumble into the water. The three agents board the abandoned ship and find the captain's decapitated body. Scully gains access to the lab and finds evidence of manipulation of ova. However, she is forced to leave when Doggett finds a time bomb on the bridge. The agents narrowly escape the explosion.

Later, Doggett confronts Kersh, who was not implicated in the conspiracy. Kersh explains to Doggett that he left the evidence that helped Doggett, and that he had told Mulder to flee, but ultimately it was Scully who actually convinced Mulder to do so. Meanwhile, Scully dreams of McMahon's and Rohrer's lifeless bodies below the harbor. Suddenly, she sees McMahon's eyes snap open. Scully wakes up and the episode cuts to William's mobile; it begins to move on its own accord.

== Production ==
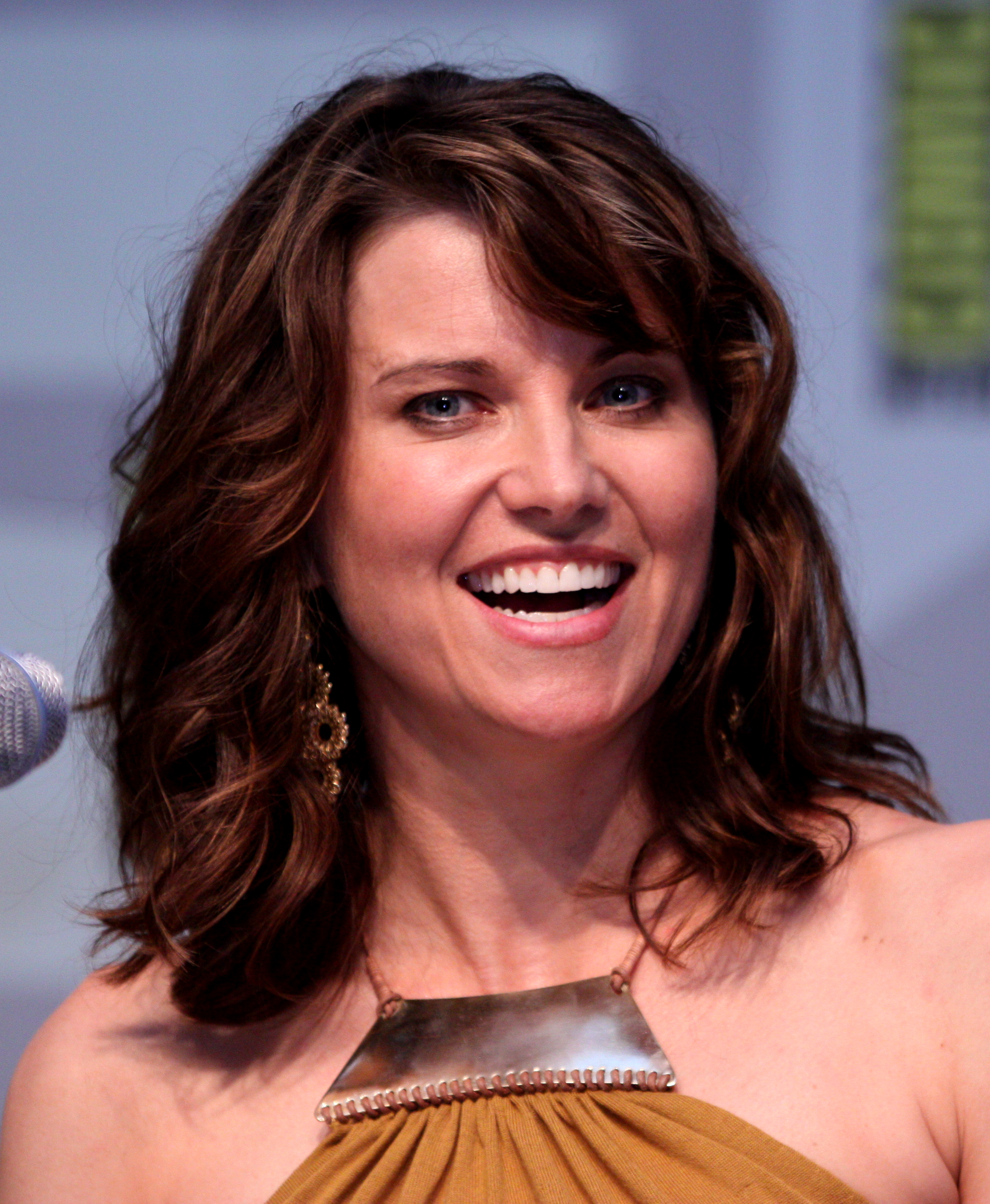
Lucy Lawless portrayed Shannon McMahon.

The title "Nothing Important Happened Today" comes from an apocryphal legend that King George III wrote the phrase in his diary on 4 July 1776, the same day that the United States declared Independence from Britain. The style of the opening credits in "Nothing Important Happened Today" was changed from the original credits, which, more or less, had been the same for the previous eight seasons. The credits included new graphics as well as new cards for Annabeth Gish and Mitch Pileggi. The tagline for Part 2 is "Nothing Important Happened Today", replacing the usual phrase "The Truth is Out There".

The first part of the episode marks the first appearance of Assistant Director Brad Follmer, who was named after Chris Carter's writing assistant. Five different actors portrayed Baby William: Rikki Held, Rowdy Held, Ashley Knutson, James Riker and Travis Riker. After learning about the 2001 cancellation of Xena Warrior Princess, Lawless was approached by the producers of The X-Files for a spot on the show. According to Lawless, one reason why she made an appearance on the show was that her daughter was a "mad X-Files fan". She further commented that she knew about the show and based her character Xena on Fox Mulder. Originally, Shannon McMahon was to be a recurring character and was due to be featured in "The Truth", the series finale of The X-Files. However, Lawless, who has a history of miscarriages, became pregnant shortly after part two of these episodes was filmed; her high-risk pregnancy prevented her returning to the series for future episodes. Carter called Lawless "hot stuff", saying it was "fun" having a female Super Soldier, something that had never occurred to him or to the show's production crew.

In the first underwater scene, most of which was shot at the water tank at Universal, Lawless had to be seat-belted into a car that was supposed to be submerged thirteen feet. In actuality, the water tank was four feet deep. Lawless, being six feet tall, had to kneel and breathe into a hookah while filming the scene. For the special effects team, one of the hardest parts of the episode was to hide the fact that Lawless was wearing a swimming suit.

== Reception ==
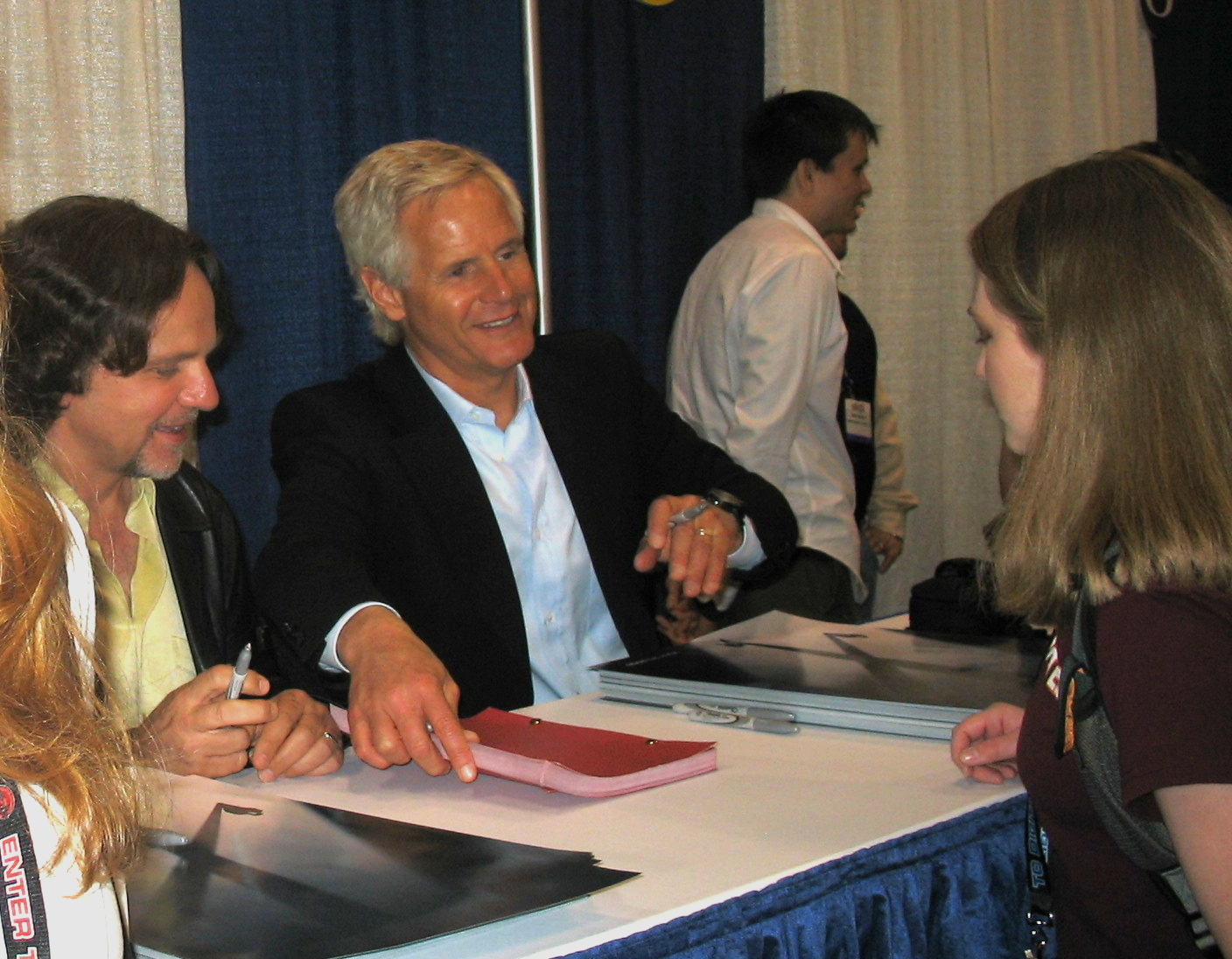
New York Comic Con during the X-Files autograph session with Chris Carter and Frank Spotnitz, creators of The X-Files.

=== Ratings ===
"Nothing Important Happened Today, Part 1" earned a Nielsen household rating of 6.5 share, meaning that it was seen by 6.5% of all 18- to 49-year-olds, of the nation's estimated households. The episode was viewed by 10.6 million viewers and ranked number 55 for the week ending November 11 and subsequently became the second most watched episode of the ninth season behind the series finale "The Truth". Part 2 earned a rating of 5.9. The episode was viewed by 9.4 million viewers ranked number 63 for the week ending November 18. The first part of the episode, which aired on Sunday, November 11, competed with Saving Private Ryan which aired on ABC. The second part of the episode earned the lowest rating on the night of November 18, receiving lower ratings and viewership numbers than The Simpsons and Malcolm in the Middle. When talking about the ninth season, Carter stated, "We lost our audience on the first episode. It's like the audience had gone away, and I didn't know how to find them. I didn't want to work to get them back because I believed what we are doing deserved to have them back".

The episode was later included on The X-Files Mythology, Volume 4 – Super Soldiers, a DVD collection that contains episodes involved with the alien super soldiers arc.

=== Reviews ===
The episode received mixed reviews from critics. Daryl H. Miller of Los Angeles Times wrote positively of the episode, claiming it is "craftily written, solidly acted and moodily photographed". Michael R. Farkash of The Hollywood Reporter gave the first part of the episode a largely positive review. Farkash called it "entertaining and appealing" and noted its "suspenseful plot twists and fascinating visuals". An unnamed staff writer of Airlock Alpha was mostly positive about the episode, with the exception of Cary Elwes as Brad Follmer, calling Elwes' acting "forced". Rob Lowman from the Los Angeles Daily News said that Carter had been able to "breathe new life" into the series mythology arc, and had a positive view of Lucy Lawless' performance. Ken Tucker of Entertainment Weekly gave the episode a B+. Starpulse named the changed credits the "Most Shocking Moment" in the series run, writing that the most drastic moment "came with the opening credits for season nine, a complete re-design that saw Annabeth Gish and Mitch Pileggi added to the opening sequence and the familiar graphics totally scrapped. These credits looked like they belonged to a different series and at that point, it was."

Emily St. James of The A.V. Club awarded the first part a "C-", and the second part a "C". She argued that the series was unable to figure out both how to re-situate itself after the events of September 11, and deal with the permanent departure of Duchovny. Ultimately, she wrote that the episodes as a whole represent "a limp piece of storytelling that has maybe enough good ideas for three-quarters of an episode but is stretched across two for no particular reason." M.A. Crang, in his book Denying the Truth: Revisiting The X-Files after 9/11, was highly critical of the script, arguing it was difficult "to pinpoint any significant moments that occur during either episode", but he did praise the production team's execution of "some impressive set-pieces." Robert Shearman and Lars Pearson, in their book Wanting to Believe: A Critical Guide to The X-Files, Millennium & The Lone Gunmen, rated both episodes one star out of five. In a review of the first part, the two noted that "this isn't quite the dullest season opener to The X-Files [but] this episode […] has all the passion of a wet Monday morning." In a review of the second half, the two noted, "there is at least the semblance of drama here, but this second episode isn't significantly better than the first." Marisa Guthrie from the Boston Herald felt that Gillian Anderson's character, Dana Scully had been "rendered impotent".

== Bibliography ==
- Kellner, Douglas (2003). Media Spectacle. Routledge. ISBN 0-415-26828-1.
- Kessenich, Tom (2002). Examination: An Unauthorized Look at Seasons 6–9 of the X-Files. Trafford Publishing. ISBN 1553698126.
- Shearman, Robert; Pearson, Lars (2009). Wanting to Believe: A Critical Guide to The X-Files, Millennium & The Lone Gunmen. Mad Norwegian Press. ISBN 978-0-9759446-9-1.
