= Angela Paton =

American actress (1930–2016)

- Born: January 11, 1930; Brooklyn, New York, U.S.
- Died: May 26, 2016 (aged 86); Oakland, California, U.S.
- Other names: Angela Paton Goldsby; Angie Paton
- Occupation(s): Actress, director, producer founder, Berkeley Stage Company
- Years active: 1972–2014
- Spouse: Bob Goldsby

Angela Paton (January 11, 1930 – May 26, 2016) was an American stage, film, and television actress and theatre director. She co-founded the Berkeley, California-based Berkeley Stage Company. She appeared in stage performances, and in comedy, drama, and thriller films, in roles including Mrs. Lancaster, the innkeeper, in Groundhog Day (1993) and Grandma in American Wedding (2003).

== Biography ==
Paton was born in Brooklyn, New York, in 1930. Described as a "natural comic" and one of the "legends of the local stage" of San Francisco, she was a veteran of the American Conservatory Theater (A.C.T.) and one of the leading actresses in its first few seasons.

After leaving A.C.T. in the early 1970s, Paton and her husband founded and ran the Berkeley Stage Company for a number of years. She appeared in 38 films and over 50 TV series.

== Personal life ==
Paton lived in Los Angeles with her husband, Robert "Bob" Goldsby (1926–2024), a professor at UC Berkeley's Department of Drama, a stage director with A.C.T., and first director of its conservatory program. Paton died of a heart attack on May 26, 2016.

== Filmography ==
Year	Title	Role	Notes
1971	Dirty Harry	Homicide Detective	Uncredited
1988	Winnie	Mrs. Spencer	TV film
1989	Roe vs. Wade		TV film
1989	Manhunt: Search for the Night Stalker	Mrs. Webster	TV film
1990	Flatliners	Doctor	
1990	Welcome Home, Roxy Carmichael	Gloria Sikes	
1991	Love, Lies and Murder	Parole Board Member #3	TV film
1991	Crazy from the Heart	Edna	TV film
1991	Lies of the Twins	Mrs. Shearer	TV film
1992	The Last of His Tribe	Mrs. Gustafson	TV film
1992	Criminal Behavior	Adelaide	TV film
1992	Keep the Change	Dinah	TV film
1993	Groundhog Day	Mrs. Lancaster	
1993	And the Band Played On	Woman in Denver	TV film
1994	Clean Slate	Shirley Pogue	
1994	Blue Sky	Dottie Owens	
1994	Where Are My Children?	Ellie McNeil	TV film
1994	Trapped in Paradise	Hattie Anderson	
1995	Home for the Holidays	Woman on Airplane	
1996	Eye for an Eye	Moderator	
1996	Hollywood Boulevard	Mary	
1997	Lolita	Mrs. Holmes	
1998	The Wedding Singer	Faye	
1998	The Con	Lyla	TV film
1999	The Joyriders	Rita Mae Tuttle	
2001	The Kennedys	Grandma	TV film
2001	Early Bird Special	Mrs. Carmichael	
2001	Joe Dirt	Woman with Roadrunner	
2003	The United States of Leland	Airplane Woman	
2003	Die, Mommie, Die!	Angela's Fan	
2003	American Wedding	Grandma	
2005	Red Eye	Nice Lady	
2006	Aisle 73	Frances Burnbaum	Short
2007	The Valley of Light	Granny	TV film
2007	Lavinia's Heist	Lavinia Silver	Short
2007	The Final Season	Anne Akers	
2013	I Am I	Doris	
2014	Last Wishes	Emilie Baptiste	Short, (final film role)

== Television ==
Year	Title	Role	Notes
1988	Thirtysomething	Nurse	1 episode
1988–1989	Falcon Crest	Harriet Anderson	6 episodes
1989	Hunter	Eva Sands	1 episode
1989	The Wonder Years	Woman at City Hall	1 episode
1990	Doctor Doctor	Pauline Meacham	1 episode
1990	Equal Justice	Mrs. King	1 episode
1990	Lifestories	Eileen Chapin	1 episode
1991	Father Dowling Mysteries		1 episode
1991	Quantum Leap	Lottie Sammis	1 episode
1991	My Life and Times	Sarah Miller	1 episode
1991	Wings	Sandy	1 episode
1991	L.A. Law	Sandra Vosburgh	1 episode
1992	Murphy Brown	Nurse #1	1 episode
1992	Doogie Howser, M.D.	Betty Jameson	1 episode
1991–1992	Nurses	Mrs. Kerper, Mrs. Pinson	2 episodes
1993	Sirens	Dognapper	1 episode
1993	Love & War	Nurse Doris	1 episode
1994	Dave's World	Mrs. Begley	1 episode
1995	Star Trek: Voyager	Aunt Adah	Episode: "Caretaker"
1995	Something Wilder	Mrs. Griffen	1 episode
1995	NYPD Blue	Josephine Stevens	1 episode
1995	Picket Fences	Mrs. Addelson	1 episode
1995	The Client	Mrs. Jarvis	1 episode
1994–1995	Home Improvement	Irma	2 episodes
1995	ER	Mrs. Ransom	1 episode
1996	Seduced by Madness	Joan	2 episodes
1996	Cybill	Evelyn	1 episode
1996	The Home Court	Marie Grant	1 episode
1996	Caroline in the City	Mrs. Larson	1 episode
1997	Ink	Mrs. Iniger	1 episode
1997	The Tom Show	Mrs. Thompson	1 episode
1997	Cracker	The Suspect	1 episode
1998	Chicago Hope	Irene	1 episode
1998	Players	Madge	1 episode
1998	Dharma & Greg	Judith	1 episode
1998	Jesse	Mrs. Baum	1 episode
1999	L.A. Doctors	Mrs. Gerken	1 episode
1999	Sliders	Mrs. Meadows	1 episode
2000	Boston Public	Mrs. Walsh	2 episodes
2001	That's Life	Mrs. Leski	1 episode
2001	The X-Files	Mrs. Lukesh	1 episode ("4-D")
2002	First Monday	Bernice Jaworski	1 episode
2002	Becker	Mrs. Bernstein	1 episode
2003	JAG	Elena Motley	1 episode
2005	Numbers	Eyewitness	1 episode
2005	Curb Your Enthusiasm	Ruth	1 episode ("Kamikaze Bingo")
2006	Four Kings	Betty	1 episode
2008	My Name Is Earl	Old Woman	1 episode
2010	Sons of Tucson	Ethel	1 episode
2010	Medium	Mrs. Halstead	1 episode
2011	Grey's Anatomy	Martha Elkin	1 episode
2014	I Didn't Do It	Mrs. Klasby	1 episode

== Theatre (selection) ==
Title	Role	Notes
The Beauty Queen of Leenane	Mag	
Dog Logic	Mother	
Harvey	Mrs. Ethel Chauvenet	On Broadway
Memoirs of Jesus		Director
Passione	Aggy	
The Sandbox	Mommy	
Three Sisters	Anfisa	
Tonight at 8.30	Mrs. Rockett	The Fumed Oak act
Woman in Mind	Muriel	
