= Release (The X-Files) =

- The X-Files episode
- Episode no.: Season 9 Episode 17
- Directed by: Kim Manners
- Story by: John Shiban; David Amann
- Teleplay by: David Amann
- Production code: 9ABX16
- Original air date: May 5, 2002
- Running time: 44 minutes

Guest appearances
- Cary Elwes as Brad Follmer; Barbara Patrick as Barbara Doggett; Jared Poe as Rudolph Hayes/Stuart Mimms; Sal Landi as Nicholas Regali; Victoria Gallegos as Follmer's Assistant; Avery Glymph as Diener; Kate Lombardi as Woman; Kipp Shiotani as Cadet No. 1; Mandy Levin as Ellen Persich

Episode chronology
← Previous "William"	Next → "Sunshine Days"
- The X-Files season 9

"Release" is the seventeenth episode of the ninth season of the American science fiction television series The X-Files. The episode originally aired on the Fox network on May 5, 2002. The teleplay for the episode was written by David Amann, from a story by John Shiban and Amann, and was directed by Kim Manners. The episode helps to explore one of the show's story arcs involving John Doggett finding the truth behind his son's murder. The episode earned a Nielsen rating of 5.1, being watched by 5.38 million households, and 7.8 million viewers in its initial broadcast. The episode received largely positive reviews from critics.

The show centers on FBI special agents who work on cases linked to the paranormal, called X-Files; this season focuses on the investigations of John Doggett (Robert Patrick), Monica Reyes (Annabeth Gish), and Dana Scully (Gillian Anderson). In this episode, Doggett stumbles upon a case that may hold a connection to the murder of his son. With the help of an FBI cadet named Rudolph Hayes (Jared Poe), Doggett acquires information to help his current case as well as establish the link between the present, his Jane Does, and the past—his son, Luke. The link is a man named Nicholas Regali, an organized crime participant who has an association with Bob Harvey, the only suspect in Luke's case. Though the cadet, Hayes, is not who he says he is, his information proves invaluable in Doggett's search for release from his son's death.

The idea for "Release" was developed by Shiban, who handed the script over to Amann. The character of Rudolph Hayes was crafted to be an ambiguous character: either he was a genius who was adept at solving crime, comparable to Sherlock Holmes, or he was a criminal mastermind, like Professor Moriarty. The final scene, featuring Doggett scattering his son's ashes, was difficult for Patrick to film, but thanks to Manners' help, he was able to achieve the desired effect.

== Plot ==
In Mendota, Minnesota, John Doggett (Robert Patrick) arrives at an abandoned apartment building after getting a tip, and sees a figure bolt out of one of the rooms during the night. He hears a scratching sound and claws away at the fresh plaster wall until blood begins streaming downward. Dana Scully (Gillian Anderson) performs an autopsy on the body Doggett found and one of her FBI cadets, Rudolph Hayes, accurately guesses that the victim “hooked up” with a psychotic killer at a bar. Hayes's suggestions lead Scully to connect this murder to another killing two weeks earlier. In the meantime, Doggett wonders why anyone tipped him off about the murder, since it is not an X-File.

Doggett and Monica Reyes (Annabeth Gish) try to get more help from Hayes. He tells them that the killer they are looking for is a criminal linked to organized crime. The two agents later meet up with Nicholas Regali, a former mobster who claims he is looking for a job in the area. They later find out that Hayes's intuition about Regali was correct. Meanwhile, Hayes returns to his apartment complex where walls are covered with crime scene photos related to the death of Luke Doggett. Eventually, Doggett asks Hayes for help solving the case about his son's death. Hayes tells Doggett that he believes that Robert Harvey was behind the kidnapping of Luke, but that Regali killed him.

Doggett approaches FBI Assistant Director Brad Follmer (Cary Elwes) for help on the case. Doggett's ex-wife, Barbara Doggett, meets up for a lineup at a police station. Barbara does not recognize Regali or anyone else on the lineup. Scully finds some similarities between Luke and the two dead bodies, but no forensic proof. Doggett comes to realize that Regali has had help from someone within the FBI all along and Reyes suspects Follmer, whom she saw taking bribes in New York. Follmer claims that he was giving money to an informer. He also reveals that Cadet Hayes is really a former mental patient called Stuart Mimms and that Mimms lived in New York City during the year of Luke's murder, hinting that Mimms is the murderer and not Regali. Doggett and Reyes assemble a SWAT team to raid Mimms apartment. Mimms is taken into police custody and at a new lineup, Barbara recognizes Mimms.

A secret meeting confirms Reyes's suspicion: Regali actually bribed Follmer. Regali denies any involvement with Luke Doggett's death. When Follmer wants to end their cooperation, Regali threatens to blackmail him. In the meantime, Mimms tells Scully that he first noticed the case of Luke Doggett when he read it in a newspaper. He further states that he lied about his name so that he could help solve the case. At the end, he still claims that Regali is the real murderer of Doggett's son, and not him.

Later on, Doggett approaches Regali, who tells him a hypothetical story about how a pedophile took a young boy to his home. A businessman then walked in on the incident, realized that the boy has seen his face, and feared that the boy might associate him with the crime. The businessman then murdered the boy. As Regali walks away, an enraged Doggett draws his gun and follows. But a gunshot rings out and when Doggett gets outside, he sees Regali has been killed by Follmer. Later, Doggett and Barbara scatter Luke's ashes into the ocean, finally achieving the release he has sought.

== Production ==
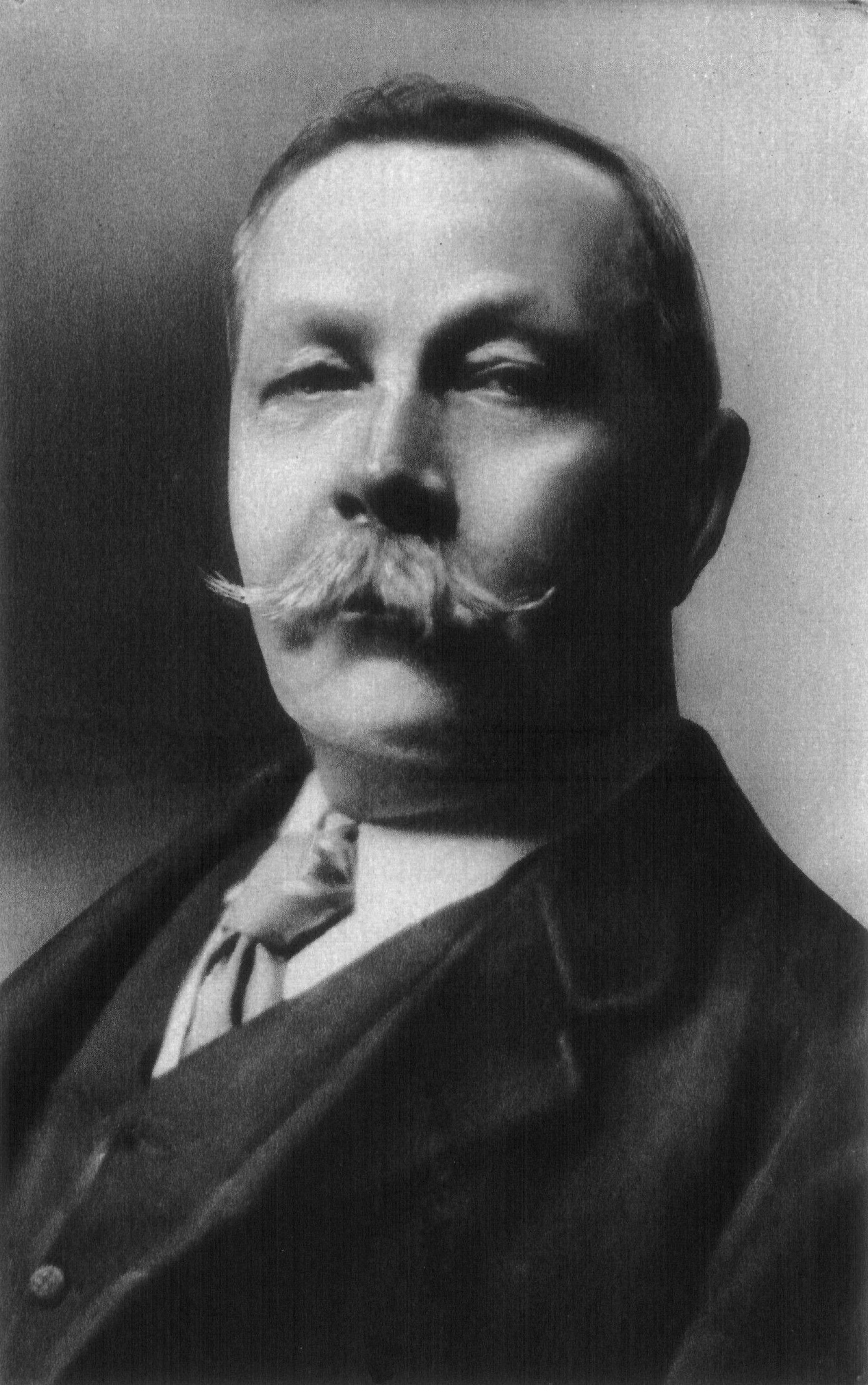
Rudolph Hayes was modeled after both Sherlock Holmes and Professor Moriarty, literary characters created by Arthur Conan Doyle (pictured).

The story for "Release" was developed by John Shiban and David Amann; the teleplay was written by Amann. Kim Manners helmed the directing of the episode. "Release" was originally going to be written by Shiban alone, but he later turned the script over to Amann because he was needed elsewhere at the time. Shiban had been desiring to write a story like "Release" for a while. Shiban and Amann came up with a story in which Scully encounters a "genius" from her classes at the FBI Academy at Quantico. Later on, they extrapolated on the story, allowing the "genius" crime solver to help John Doggett find out what happened to his son, Luke Doggett. Hayes was written to be an ambiguous character, inspired by the works of Arthur Conan Doyle: he was written to be either a "brilliant guy who's solving crimes with his amazing intuition", comparable to Sherlock Holmes, or "a guy who's actually doing those crimes and playing a game", like Professor Moriarty.

Robert Patrick called the final scene, in which Doggett and his ex-wife scatter Luke's remains, "difficult". He later noted that Manners "was there to guide us along; I can think of no worst [sic] nightmare for a parent than to lose their child." The episode was written to give closure to Doggett's story. Patrick later said that, if the series had continued for a tenth season, he would have liked to see his character develop a relationship with Reyes, because "I think Doggett was very attracted to Reyes […] I would have liked to see the relationship with Reyes explored more." Gish agreed, noting that the show's ending never allowed the idea to be fleshed out, but that Reyes "would have definitely gone further with their relationship."

== Reception ==
=== Ratings ===
"Release" first aired in the United States on May 5, 2002, and was first broadcast in the United Kingdom on BBC Two on March 9, 2003. The episode's initial broadcast was viewed by approximately 5.38 million households, (Note: At the time of airing, the estimated number of households was 105.5 million. Thus, 5.1 percent of 105.5 million is 5.38 million households.) and 7.8 million viewers. It ranked as the fifty-fifth most watched episode of television that aired during the week ending May 5. "Release" earned a Nielsen household rating of 5.1, meaning that it was seen by 5.1% of the nation's estimated households.

=== Reviews ===
"Release" received positive reviews from critics. Jessica Morgan from Television Without Pity gave the episode an A− grade. In a season review, Michelle Kung from Entertainment Weekly called the episode "worthy", but noted that it was overshadowed by the show's "ludicrous conspiracy plots". Jeffrey Robinson from DVD Talk concluded that "Release" was a "good episode" because it "presented conclusions to [one of the] long running stories in the series [in that it] featured the conclusion to John Doggett's personal trial, his quest for closure with his son's murder." Robert Shearman and Lars Pearson, in their book Wanting to Believe: A Critical Guide to The X-Files, Millennium & The Lone Gunmen, gave the episode a glowing review and rated it five stars out of five. The two argued that, because of the "minimal emphasis" Doggett's son's murder was given in the show, the episode "packs [a] punch". Shearman and Pearson saw similarities between Doggett's trials and those of Fox Mulder (David Duchovny). They noted that while "Mulder was always identified by his quest for his sister [Samantha]", Doggett "carried the loss of his son as a private grief." They concluded that this structuring made the entry "emotionally powerful" and "moving". M.A. Crang, in his book Denying the Truth: Revisiting The X-Files after 9/11, complimented the "lyrical style" of the episode, calling it "gorgeously shot" and "well acted".

== Bibliography ==
- Kessenich, Tom (2002). Examination: An Unauthorized Look at Seasons 6–9 of the X-Files. Trafford Publishing. ISBN 1553698126.
- Crang, M.A. (2015). Denying the Truth: Revisiting The X-Files after 9/11. Createspace. ISBN 9781517009038.
