= Dæmonicus =

- The X-Files episode
- Josef Kobold throwing up on Doggett at a mental asylum
- Episode no.: Season 9 Episode 3
- Directed by: Frank Spotnitz
- Written by: Frank Spotnitz
- Production code: 9ABX03
- Original air date: December 2, 2001
- Running time: 44 minutes

Guest appearances
- James Remar as Professor Josef Kobold; Robert Beckwith as First FBI Cadet; Sarah Benoit as Evelyn Mountjoy; Andi Chapman as Dr. Monique Sampson; Rueben Grundy as Forensic Technician; Tim Halligan as Darren Mountjoy; Elijah Majar as Guard; Troy Mittleider as Dr. Kenneth Richmond; Shane Nickerson as Police Photographer; James Rekart as Paul Gerlach; Lou Richards as Officer Custer; Melissa Spotnitz as Second FBI Cadet

Episode chronology
← Previous "Nothing Important Happened Today II"	Next → "4-D"
- The X-Files season 9

"Dæmonicus" is the third episode of the ninth season of the American science fiction television series The X-Files and the show's 185th episode overall. It first premiered on the Fox network in the United States on December 2, 2001. The episode was written and directed by executive producer Frank Spotnitz. The episode is a "monster-of-the-week" episode, a stand-alone plot which is unconnected to the mythology, or overarching fictional history, of The X-Files. The episode earned a Nielsen rating of 5.5 and its premiere was viewed by 5.80 million households. The episode received mixed reviews from television critics.

The show centers on FBI special agents who work on cases linked to the paranormal, called X-Files; this season focuses on the investigations of John Doggett (Robert Patrick), Monica Reyes (Annabeth Gish), and Dana Scully (Gillian Anderson). In this episode, Doggett, Reyes, and Scully investigate a series of bizarre killings that seem to be due to demonic possession but which Doggett believes is a hoax. The agents soon meet Josef Kobold (James Remar), a man who seems to be playing some sort of demonic game.

"Dæmonicus" was written by Spotnitz to develop the new settings for the show's Monster-of-the-Week episodes, as well as the series in general. One of the major steps taken was to move Scully from the X-Files office to the FBI Academy at Quantico. When creating Josef Kobold, the episode's antagonist, Spotnitz researched various crimes and criminals, until he learned about Caryl Chessman, a man who had been sentenced to death on a technical charge of kidnapping. Series co-star Robert Patrick had issues remembering and delivering his lines, due to the theme of demonic possession, which reportedly made him uneasy.

== Plot ==
Following a bizarre double-murder with Satanic ritual overtones in Weston, West Virginia, John Doggett (Robert Patrick) and Monica Reyes (Annabeth Gish) are offered the case. Doggett and Reyes ask Dana Scully (Gillian Anderson) to do an autopsy on the murder victims. The agents come to the conclusion that one of the murder victims was somehow tricked into killing his wife, while evidence at the scene points to two perpetrators. A single clue, the word "Daemonicus", is left spelled out on a Scrabble board the victims had been playing before being attacked. When Reyes claims to have felt the presence of evil, Doggett responds with great irritation. Dr. Monique Sampson calls them, saying that the murders may be connected to an escaped mental patient, Dr. Kenneth Richman, and a guard, Paul Gerlach.

Meanwhile, in a wooded area, the two perpetrators, both wearing demon masks, face each other some twenty paces apart. One of the perpetrators raises his gun and shoots the other. At the mental institution, the two agents interview Josef Kobold (James Remar), the neighbouring patient of Richman. The answers Kobold gives are unsettling for the agents, as he says that one of the perpetrators has killed again, showing them the location and warning them of "something horrible" happening there. After the dead perpetrator's body is recovered, Scully performs an autopsy and discovers that the body belongs to Gerlach.

The agents ask Kobold for help finding the remaining perpetrator. When speaking to Kobold, he suddenly speaks in a strange backward whispering and erupts in convulsions. Reyes hears the word "medicus," meaning "physician." After putting Kobold in the custody of another guard named Custer, Doggett and Reyes race to Sampson's home and find her dead, with a dozen hypodermic needles jammed into her face. During a one-on-one confrontation, Kobold taunts Doggett about his personal life before vomiting all over him. That night, the power suddenly goes out in the mental institution: Custer approaches Kobold's cell and witnesses him turning into a demon.

Doggett phones Scully to tell her that Kobold claims Richman is at an old marina near Annandale, Virginia. Scully drives there, but is attacked by Richman. When Doggett and Reyes arrive, they hear a gunshot from inside an abandoned warehouse. There, they find Richman dead. Scully explains that he was holding her at gunpoint until they arrived, then shot himself. After Scully's lecture to FBI cadets, Doggett explains to her and Reyes that Kobold planned the entire ordeal as a game and got away with it. He explains that the word "Dae/moni/cus" was code for the chosen victims' names, in a game Kobold devised to culminate in his eventual escape from the asylum, and that the "demons" angle was merely to get the X-files' involvement and that they were all thoroughly "checkmated" by Kobold. Reyes, though accepting of Doggett's theories, is still nevertheless disconcerted with the true feeling of evil that she experienced, and believes Doggett was equally out of sorts because, though loath to admit it, he too felt its presence.

== Production ==
=== Writing and directing ===
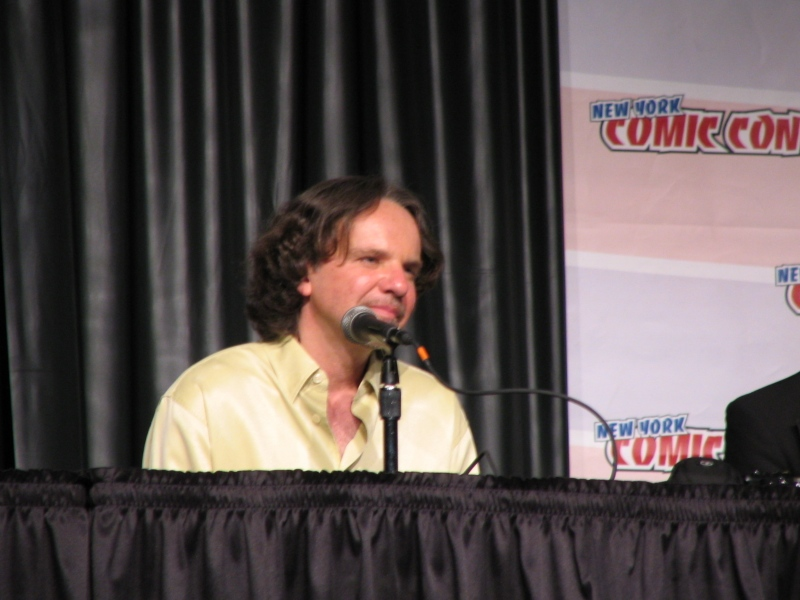
"Dæmonicus" was written and directed by executive producer Frank Spotnitz.

"Dæmonicus" was written and directed by executive producer Frank Spotnitz, marking his third credit as a writer and first credit as director for the season. The episode also marked the second time that Spotnitz helmed an episode's directing, with the first being "Alone". "Daemonicus" is the first Monster-of-the-Week episode of season nine, meaning a stand-alone episode unconnected to the series' wider mythology; as season nine was promoted as the "new" X-Files, it was important to develop new settings for the show. One of these new settings was to move Dana Scully from the X-Files office to the FBI Academy at Quantico. The scenes at the FBI Academy were shot at a lecture hall at UCLA. Spotnitz’s wife, Melissa, appears as one of the students in Scully’s class.

Spotnitz later called Kobold, the episode's main antagonist, "the devil, in a cell." When creating Kobold, Spotnitz researched various crimes and criminals, until he came across the name of Caryl Chessman, who had been sentenced to death on a technical charge of kidnapping. He was then able to connect the word "chessman" to the idea that, for Kobold, his crimes were all a game. Spotnitz wanted the villain to be a character that "could help", and not a character that would just tell the viewers "what The X-Files was again".

Series co-star Robert Patrick had issues remembering and delivering his lines due to the theme of demonic possession, which reportedly "was freaking" him out. He later explained, "It was the first time that I couldn't do my lines. Usually I would show up, and they'd always put the camera on me first [but this time] I couldn't do it."

=== Filming ===
The finished episode contains several sequences of Josef Kobold vomiting. Spotnitz had not intended the finished product to feature all the shots but the editor at that time, Chris Cooke, "cut it that way." Spotnitz felt that it "was so completely over the top." To create the shots, the production crew used tubes which supplied the faux vomit. The tubes were discreetly fitted to actor James Remar's mouth. Remar, in turn, only had to open his mouth during the shooting of the sequence. Spotnitz later joked that he had "a thing for vomiting".

== Reception ==
"Dæmonicus" first premiered on the Fox network in the United States on December 2, 2001. The episode earned a Nielsen household rating of 5.5, meaning that it was seen by 5.5% of the nation's estimated households and was viewed by 5.80 million households. (Note: At the time of airing, the estimated number of households was 105.5 million. Thus, 5.5 percent of 105.5 million is 5.80 million households.) "Dæmonicus" was the 68th most watched episode of television that aired during the week ending December 2. The episode later aired in the United Kingdom on BBC One on November 17, 2002.

The episode received mixed reviews from television critics. Jessica Morgan of Television Without Pity gave the episode a "C" grade rating. Robert Shearman and Lars Pearson, in their book Wanting to Believe: A Critical Guide to The X-Files, Millennium & The Lone Gunmen, rated the episode one-and-a-half stars out of five. The two criticized Spotnitz "attention seeking direction", citing the "strange cross fades" and "exaggerated camera angles" as detractors. Furthermore, they were critical about the story, writing that it was "all over the place". Ultimately, Shearman and Pearson concluded that the entry was an example of "this new season [needing] to try a little harder" in order to become a success.

Zack Handlen of The A.V. Club gave the episode a "C−" and wrote that while the episode had a lot of gruesome moments, such as the corpses with snakes inside of them and the gristly murders, the "meandering structure, over-emphasized grimness, and deadening pace render all of these elements inert". He also felt that, after "Nothing Important Happened Today"—which he called a "snooze-fest"—"Daemonicus" was a "disheartening [way] to get back to monster of the week episodes". Other reviews were more positive. M.A. Crang, in his book Denying the Truth: Revisiting The X-Files after 9/11, said the episode was "sluggishly paced" but praised the "wonderfully tense atmosphere" and Spotnitz's "stylish directing choices". In a season review, Michelle Kung from Entertainment Weekly called the episode "worthy", but noted that it was overshadowed by the show's "ludicrous conspiracy plots".

== Bibliography ==
- Hurwitz, Matt; Knowles, Chris (2008). The Complete X-Files. Insight Editions. ISBN 978-1933784809.
- Shearman, Robert; Pearson, Lars (2009). Wanting to Believe: A Critical Guide to The X-Files, Millennium & The Lone Gunmen. Mad Norwegian Press. ISBN 978-0975944691.
