= Annabeth Gish =

American actress (born 1971)

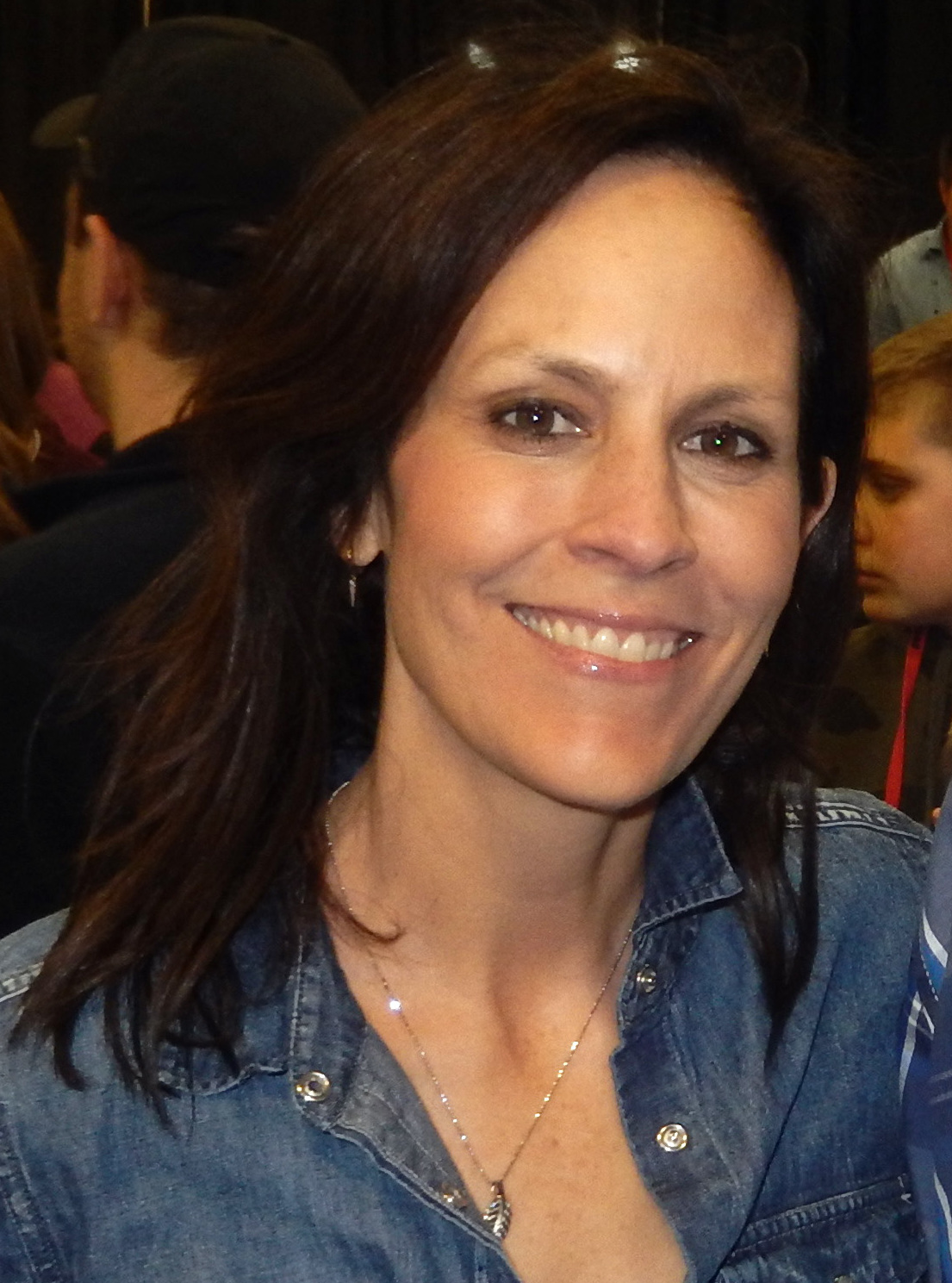
- Gish in 2019
- Born: Anne Elizabeth Gish; March 13, 1971 (age 55); Albuquerque, New Mexico, U.S.
- Education: Duke University (BA)
- Occupation: Actress
- Years active: 1986–present
- Spouse: Wade Allen (m. 2003)
- Children: 2

Annabeth Gish (born Anne Elizabeth Gish; March 13, 1971) is an American actress. She played roles in the films Shag, Hiding Out, Mystic Pizza, SLC Punk!, The Last Supper and Double Jeopardy. On television, she played Special Agent Monica Reyes on The X-Files, Elizabeth Bartlet Westin on The West Wing, Diane Gould on Halt and Catch Fire, Eileen Caffee on Brotherhood, Sarah Gunning on Midnight Mass, Charlotte Millwright on The Bridge and Sheriff Althea Jarry on the seventh and final season of Sons of Anarchy.

== Early life ==
Gish was born in Albuquerque, New Mexico, the daughter of Judy and Robert Gish. When she was two, her family moved to Cedar Falls, Iowa, where she grew up with her brother, Tim, and her sister, Robin. Her father was an English professor at the University of Northern Iowa; her mother was an elementary school teacher.

Gish went to Northern University High School in Cedar Falls, where she graduated in 1989. She attended Duke University, where she was a member of the Kappa Kappa Gamma sorority and focused her energies on the drama program, film studies and women's studies. She graduated in 1993, earning a B.A. in English.

== Career ==
Gish's first starring role was in the 1986 teen film Desert Bloom. In 1987, she starred in the film Hiding Out with Jon Cryer. She played Kat, the sister of Julia Roberts' character, in 1988's Mystic Pizza. In 1989, Gish's first major TV film role was in When He's Not a Stranger as rape victim Lyn McKenna. Gish portrayed Anne Hampton, the doomed second wife of Rhett Butler, in 1994 in the TV mini series Scarlett. She starred in the 1989 comedy Shag, starring Bridget Fonda, Phoebe Cates, Page Hannah, Jeff Yagher and Scott Coffey.

In 1994's Wyatt Earp, starring Kevin Costner, she played Urilla Sutherland, Wyatt's childhood sweetheart and eventual wife. The next year, she appeared in Oliver Stone's Nixon as Julie Nixon. In 1996, Gish played the lead character Willie Conway's girlfriend Tracey in Beautiful Girls. In 1997, Gish received her first starring role in a movie, portraying Susan Sparks opposite Shaquille O'Neal in the movie adaptation of DC Comics superhero Steel. In 1997, she starred in the TV movie True Women as Euphemia Ashby alongside Dana Delany and Angelina Jolie. In 1998, Gish starred in SLC Punk! as a head shop owner named Trish.

In 2000, Gish joined the cast of The X-Files as Special Agent Monica Reyes after series star David Duchovny announced his intention to leave the show. During the eighth and ninth seasons, Gish and fellow newcomer Robert Patrick became the show's principal characters and it was presumed that the two could carry on the show even after Gillian Anderson left. While it is generally agreed their performances were good, ratings continued to drop with the departure of Duchovny and his dynamic partnership with Anderson; the ninth season of The X-Files became the show's last until 2016.

She guest-starred on The West Wing playing Elizabeth Bartlet Westin, eldest daughter of President Josiah Bartlet (Martin Sheen), first appearing in 2003. In 2006, Gish played the role of Julia in the independent movie The Celestine Prophecy and co-starred in Candles on Bay Street alongside Eion Bailey and Alicia Silverstone. The same year she landed a lead role in the Showtime drama Brotherhood as Eileen Caffee, and appeared in 29 of the 33 episodes in the series' three-season run.

Gish played Jo Noonan in the A&E TV miniseries Stephen King's Bag of Bones in 2011. Also in 2011, she played the role of Anne Sullivan, a mysterious therapist in Pretty Little Liars. In 2012, she made a guest appearance in twelfth season of the CBS crime drama CSI: Crime Scene Investigation. The same year she co-starred on the ABC drama pilot Americana as the mother of Ashley Greene's character. However, the pilot was not picked up.

From 2013 to 2014, Gish was part of the main cast in the FX series The Bridge, in which she played Charlotte Millwright, a widow who discovers that her recently deceased husband had secrets on both sides of the US–Mexican border. She had a guest-starring role on Sons of Anarchy as Lt. Althea Jarry of the San Joaquin County Sheriff's Department, in 2014. The following summer, it was announced Gish would return as Monica Reyes in the upcoming The X-Files revival, appearing in episode 6 of season 10, and reprising her role in the eleventh season. She co-starred with Kate Bosworth, Thomas Jane and Dash Mihok in the 2016 thriller film Before I Wake.

Gish appeared as drug lord Alice Sands in three episodes of the TNT series Rizzoli & Isles, in 2016. Two years later she had a recurring role as the caretaker Mrs. Dudley in the Netflix series The Haunting of Hill House, based loosely off of Shirley Jackson's novel of the same name. In 2021 she again teamed up with Mike Flanagan in the Netflix horror series, Midnight Mass.

== Humanitarian efforts ==
Gish is a supporter of CARE International and, more recently, of Students Rebuild and One Million Bones. On behalf of these organizations, she filmed a short public service announcement video in April 2012. She is on the board of non-profit organization The Unusual Suspects Theatre Company.

== Personal life ==
Despite persistent reports, Gish is not related to the early silent film actress sisters Lillian and Dorothy Gish. When Gish first became interested in acting, she wrote a letter to Lillian Gish, who replied by encouraging Annabeth to stay away from the business. Lillian wrote, "There's too much talent and not enough work in the movies!"

Gish started dating The X-Files stunt man Wade Allen in December 2001. They married in October 2003 and have two children.

== Filmography ==
Key
†	Denotes works that have not yet been released

=== Film ===
Year	Title	Role	Notes
1986	Hero in the Family	Jessie	
1986	Desert Bloom	Rose Chismore	
1987	Hiding Out	Ryan Campbell	
1988	Mystic Pizza	Kat Araujo	Nominated: Young Artist Award for Best Young Actress in a Motion Picture – Drama
1989	Shag	Caroline "Pudge" Carmichael	
1989	When He's Not a Stranger	Lyn McKenna	Television film Nominated: Young Artist Award for Best Young Actress in a Motion Picture – Drama
1990	Coupe de Ville	Tammy	
1991	The Last to Go	Lydia	Television film
1992	Lady Against the Odds	Sylvia Raffray	Television film
1993	Silent Cries	Hazel Hampton	
1994	Wyatt Earp	Urilla Sutherland	
1995	The Last Supper	Paulie	
1995	Nixon	Julie Nixon Eisenhower	Nominated: Screen Actors Guild Award for Outstanding Performance by a Cast in a Motion Picture
1996	Beautiful Girls	Tracy Stover	
1996	Don't Look Back	Michelle	Television film
1996	What Love Sees	Jean Treadway Holly	Television film
1997	True Women	Euphemia Ashby	Television film
1997	Mayday—Flug in den Tod	Maria Philips	
1997	Steel	Susan Sparks	
1998	SLC Punk!	Trish	
1998	To Live Again	Karen Holmes	Television film
1999	Double Jeopardy	Angie Green/Angie Ryder	
1999	God's New Plan	Claire Hutton	Television film
1999	Different	Hope Goodell	
1999	Sealed with a Kiss	Robbie	
1999	No Higher Love	Claire Hutton/Young	
2001	The Way She Moves	Amie	Television film
2001	Pursuit of Happiness	Marissa	Slamdunk Film Festival for Best Actress
2001	Morning	Lily	
2001	Race to Space	Dr. Donni McGuinness	
2002	Buying the Cow	Nicole	
2002	A Death in the Family	Mary Follet	Television film
2004	Knots	Greta Siegel	
2004	Life on Liberty Street	Denise Di Fiori	Television film
2005	Detective	Cynthia Ernst	Television film
2006	Gillery's Little Secret	Gillery	Short film
2006	The Celestine Prophecy	Julia	
2006	Mojave Phone Booth	Beth	
2006	Desperation	Mary Jackson	
2006	Candles on Bay Street	Lydia	Television film
2008	Of Murder and Memory	Sally Linden	Television film
2009	An American Girl: Chrissa Stands Strong	Meg Maxwell	
2010	At Risk	Det. Delma Sykes	Television film
2010	The Letter	Beth	Short film
2011	The Chaperone	Lynne	
2011	Commerce	Beth	Short film
2011	Texas Killing Fields	Gwen Heigh	
2011	Home Run Showdown	Michelle	
2012	A Mother's Nightmare	Maddie	Television film
2016	Before I Wake	Natalie	
2016	Term Life	Lucy	
2017	All Summers End	Mrs. Turner	
2018	Nightmare Cinema	Charity	
2018	A Father's Nightmare	Maddie Stewart	Television film
2018	Charlie Says	Virginian Carlson	
2019	Rim of the World	Grace	
2020	Butter	Doctor Jennice	
2023	All Fun and Games	Kathy Fletcher	
2023	Little Dixie	Billie Riggs	
2024	Ride	Monica Hawkins	

=== Television ===
Year	Title	Role	Notes
1983	Swiss Valley Farms	Waterloo Iowa	Lead (Commercials series)
1994	Scarlett	Anne Hampton	4 episodes
1995	Courthouse	Lenore Laderman	11 episodes
1996	Chicago Hope	Amy Peletier	Episode: "Three Men and a Lady"
2001–2018	The X-Files	Monica Reyes	27 episodes Nominated: Saturn Award for Best Supporting Actress on Television
2003–2006	The West Wing	Elizabeth Bartlet Westin	6 episodes
2004	CSI: Miami	Wendy Decker	Episode: "Not Landing"
2006–2008	Brotherhood	Eileen Caffee	29 episodes
2008	The Cleaner	Barbara Hoffler	Episode: "Meet the Joneses"
2010	Criminal Minds	Rebecca Hodges	Episode: "Parasite"
2010	FlashForward	Lita	3 episodes
2011	Lie to Me	Ilene	Episode: "Saved"
2011	Against the Wall	Chief Julie Carmen	Episode: "A Good Cop "
2011	Bag of Bones	Jo Noonan	2 episodes
2011–2012	CSI: Crime Scene Investigation	Laura Gabriel	3 episodes
2011–2015	Pretty Little Liars	Dr. Anne Sullivan	9 episodes
2012	Americana	Rachel Clarke	Unsold TV pilot
2012	Once Upon a Time	Anita	Episode: "Child of the Moon"
2013	Parks and Recreation	Stephanie Wyatt	Episode: "Partridge"
2013–2014	The Bridge	Charlotte Millwright	18 episodes
2014	Parenthood	Ms. York	Episode: "The Pontiac"
2014	Betrayal	Violet	Episode: "...The Karsten Way"
2014	Sons of Anarchy	Sheriff Althea Jarry	10 episodes
2016	Scandal	Lillian Forrester	3 episodes
2016	Rizzoli & Isles	Alice Sands	3 episodes
2016	Flaked	Alicia Wiener	Episode: "7th"
2016–2017	Halt and Catch Fire	Diane Gould	17 episodes
2017	Law & Order: Special Victims Unit	Carolyn Rivers	Episode: "Contrapasso"
2018	The Haunting of Hill House	Clara Dudley	6 episodes
2021	Gone Mom: The Jennifer Dulos Story	Jennifer Dulos	Television movie
2021	Midnight Mass	Dr. Sarah Gunning	7 episodes
2022	FreeRayshawn	Detective Lincoln	7 episodes
2022	Barry	Julie	2 episodes
2023	Mayfair Witches	Deirdre Mayfair	5 episodes
2023	Succession	Joy	1 episode
2023	The Fall of the House of Usher	Eliza Usher	1 episode
2024	Pretty Little Liars	Dr. Anne Sullivan	7 episodes
2024	Lioness	Denise Westfield	1 episode
TBA	The Night Agent †	Holland	Recurring role (season 4)
