= The X-Files merchandise =

Merchandise related to the American television The X-Files franchise includes VHS and DVD sets, compact discs, video games, T-shirts and a magazine devoted specifically to the show.

== Music ==
Some of composer Mark Snow's music from the first three seasons of The X-Files was released on the album The Truth and the Light - Music from the X-Files, which also included dialogue from the show.

Snow's main X-Files theme was released with other songs used in and inspired by the show (by such artists as Soul Coughing, Nick Cave, Screamin' Jay Hawkins and PM Dawn among others) on 1996 soundtrack Songs in the Key of X. For the release of the theme as a single a music video was created with clips from the show (this video was not included as bonus features on any DVD/VHS sets). The theme song was remixed by The Dust Brothers on the movie soundtrack The X-Files: The Album, which also included songs by the Foo Fighters, X, Björk, Filter, Sting & Aswad, and others.

Snow also released the score of The X-Files movie.

In May 2011 the first of two volumes of Mark Snow's score for the series was released in a four-disc box set by La La Land Records. The set came complete with detailed descriptions of each cue. The set was limited to 3000 units and has since sold out. Although it is only the first installment of two volumes, this release includes tracks all the way through to the very end final scene of the series. The second volume was released September 10, 2013 to coincide with the 20th Anniversary of the Series Premiere.

Volume One was re-released in February, 2016 to coincide with the new mini-series on Fox.

== DVD releases ==
=== Complete season sets ===
The entire series is currently available on DVD by season.

| Season | Episodes | Originally aired | DVD release date | | |
| Season | Episodes | Originally aired | Region 1 | Region 2 | Region 4 |
|---|---|---|---|---|---|
| 1 | 24 | 1993–1994 | May 9, 2000 | November 6, 2000 | November 22, 2000 |
| 2 | 25 | 1994–1995 | November 28, 2000 | April 30, 2001 | April 20, 2001 |
| 3 | 24 | 1995–1996 | May 8, 2001 | November 26, 2001 | November 12, 2001 |
| 4 | 24 | 1996–1997 | November 13, 2001 | April 22, 2002 | April 24, 2002 |
| 5 | 20 | 1997–1998 | May 14, 2002 | October 14, 2002 | November 11, 2002 |
| 6 | 22 | 1998–1999 | November 5, 2002 | March 17, 2003 | May 13, 2003 |
| 7 | 22 | 1999–2000 | May 13, 2003 | September 22, 2003 | October 20, 2003 |
| 8 | 21 | 2000–2001 | November 4, 2003 | March 14, 2004 | April 14, 2004 |
| 9 | 20 | 2001–2002 | May 11, 2004 | June 7, 2004 | July 27, 2004 |

==== Slimmer versions ====
The entire series was re-released on DVD in a "slimmer" package, sans some bonus materials that were featured in the original fold out versions. Seasons 6, 7 and 8 contain all of the bonus material found in the original versions. All other seasons in the U.S. region 1 DVDs are missing the additional special features. In the U.S. Seasons 1, 2 & 3 were released on January 31, 2006, Seasons 4, 5 & 6 were released March 28, 2006, and Seasons 7, 8 & 9 were released on June 6, 2006. In 2008, each season were released as one single DVD case each containing 6 discs except Season 5 and Season 9 which contain 5 discs.

European editions of the slim sets include all the features of the original packages. Seasons 1, 2 & 3 were released on October 11, 2004, Seasons 4, 5 & 6 were released on December 27, 2004, and Seasons 7, 8 & 9 were released on March 14, 2005.

In Australia during the original release of the series (each season was a fold out box set), the series was re-repacked into Collector Edition Boxsets (as were the original fold out sets) which contained the same bonus material as the original release between 2001 and 2004 alongside the original sets, however the discs were housed in plastic cases, Season 1-4 contained 4 cases, Seasons 5-9 contained 3 cases. On 18 May 2005, came the second repackage sets where each season was split into two parts (part 1 and part 2) which each part contained 3 discs, except for season two where Part 2 contained 4 discs, this marked the first time that not all bonus materials were available, Seasons 2, 5-8 contained all bonus material. On 5 September 2007, the series was re-packed into slimline sets. Early 2016, all 9 seasons were released in slimline cases with new artwork (same as the blu-ray releases).

=== Mythology sets ===
These DVD sets contain the episodes related to the conspiracy mythology, and avoids the stand-alone episodes. There are four volumes detailing different storylines.

- Volume 1 – Abduction
- Volume 2 – Black Oil
- Volume 3 – Colonization
- Volume 4 – Super Soldiers

=== Standalone episodes ===
These DVD sets, which were only released in Region 2, contain selected two-part episodes edited together into feature length movies. Special features include behind-the-scenes videos and character featurettes. Collectible cards were also included with the first four sets.

- Deadalive ("This Is Not Happening" and "Deadalive")
- Existence ("Essence" and "Existence")
- Nothing Important Happened Today ("Nothing Important Happened Today")
- Providence ("Provenance" and "Providence")
- The Truth ("The Truth", with "William" included as an extra bonus episode)

=== "Revelations" collection ===
Intended to act as an entry point for viewers new to the series, an two-disc collection titled The X-Files: Revelations (also known as Essentials in some markets) was released in 2008. The set contains the following episodes:

- "Pilot" (from season 1)
- "Beyond the Sea" (from season 1)
- "The Host" (from season 2)
- "Clyde Bruckman's Final Repose" (from season 3)
- "Memento Mori" (from season 4)
- "The Post-Modern Prometheus" (from season 5)
- "Bad Blood" (from season 5)
- "Milagro" (from season 6)

Each episode is accompanied by an introduction by series creator Chris Carter and executive producer Frank Spotnitz. The collection also includes two additional extras; a WonderCon panel featuring the series cast and crew, and a trailer for The X-Files: I Want to Believe.

=== Complete series box set ===
Fox released The X-Files: The Ultimate Collection DVD set in region 1 on November 6, 2007, which includes all 9 seasons and the first movie. The bonus features are the same as the previous sets; with the addition of the bonus features produced for the mythology box sets and special DVD-Rom games. It also includes a season one comic book and a theatrical poster of the first movie and totals 61 discs. On December 8, 2015, the first collection on Blu-ray was released titled The X-Files: The Collector's Set, this set includes all bonus materials from original DVD sets and mythology sets but does not include the movies. A reissue Blu-ray collection will be released June 24, 2016, which will include The Event Series.

A Region 2 version, called The X-Files: The Complete DVD Collection Season 1–9 (59-Disc Set), was released October 30, 2006. This set contains only the series and excludes the movie. Each season are the slim sets. A new collection The X-Files: The Complete Collector's Edition (61-Disc Set), was released on November 19, 2007, and contained the series (1–9), series guide, the movie and the bonus features disk. A third collection The X-Files: The Complete Series - Seasons 1–9 + Movies (55-Disc Set) was released October 1, 2012. This set includes both 'Fight the Future' and 'I Want to Believe' films. It does however miss out on some bonus features in previous sets. On December 7, 2015, a Blu-ray boxset titled The X-Files: The Collector's Set was released. Containing all bonus materials from the original sets and mythology sets, though this set does not include the movies.

In Australia, the complete series set was released on November 25, 2008. This set contains 61 DVDs. This includes all 9 seasons and the first and second movies. Over 28 hours of special features. Packaged as a slide out book, the set is called The X Files: Uncover the Truth Collection. On December 1, 2010, a new complete series set was released titled The X-Files: The Whole Story, which contained all 9 seasons in the slimline cases (2007 releases), Fight the Future movie and I Want to Believe movie, housed on a collector tin. On November 22, 2013, another set was released, titled The X-Files: The Complete Series, which is a 55-Disc set and contains all nine seasons, which are the same sets as the 2007 releases and also the two feature films were included. On December 9, 2015, the first Blu-ray set was released titled The X-Files: The Collector's Set (57-disc set), which contains all 9 seasons with all bonus material that were featured in the original individual season releases and the two feature films. Released on May 25, 2016, is The X-Files: The Complete Series Blu-ray that includes The Event Series. A DVD box set was also released to include The Event Series on the same date; the box is similar to the previous DVD set.

== VHS releases ==
Before the DVD full season releases, The X-Files had its episodes released in VHS season sets in parts of the world, as well as selected single episodes put together. There was other material released on VHS, such as The X Files - Forensic Evidence Box and the X Files Trivia Game.

=== "Wave" sets ===
The original VHS release of The X-Files in North America consisted of selected episodes from each of the first four seasons, which were released on a staggered basis beginning in 1996.

Each "wave" was three VHS tapes, each containing two episodes, for a total of six episodes per wave and two waves per season (for example, the home video release of Wave 1 drew from the first half of the first season: "Pilot"/"Deep Throat", "Conduit"/"Ice" and "Fallen Angel"/"Eve"). Each wave was also available in a boxed set. Ultimately 12 episodes (approximately half the total number aired) were selected by Chris Carter to represent each season, including nearly all "mythology arc" episodes and selected standalone episodes. Carter would briefly introduce each episode on the tape with an explanation of why it was chosen and anecdotes from the set. These same clips were later included on The X-Files full season DVDs. Wave 8 covering the last part of the fourth season was the last to be released. VHS "wave" tapes were not released for the fifth and later seasons, so there are no Carter "interviews" for selected episodes included on those DVDs.

The last wave (wave 8 of the VHS series) did not have collectible cards (one per video tape) as had been included in each of the previous seven waves/releases.

In the UK, in May 1995, two tapes were released. Each contained two episodes of the first season. It was intended to release all 24 episodes, two per tape, two tapes per month. The high UK television ratings prompted Fox Home Video to cease these releases after June 1995. Eventually, all nine seasons were released on VHS in limited edition box sets.

The first VHS releases in Australia and the second releases in the UK were released in the format of File 1, File 2, etc., up until File 12, which was the final episode of Season 5. They were released from 1995 through until 1998. These are as follows:

- File 1 - The Unanswered File ("The Unopened File" in the UK) (episodes "Anasazi", "The Blessing Way" and "Paper Clip) (1995)
- File 2 - Tooms (episodes "Squeeze" and "Tooms") (1996)
- File 3 - Abduction (episodes "Duane Barry", "Ascension" and "One Breath") (1996)
- File 4 - Colony (episodes "Colony" and "End Game) (1996)
- Secrets of The X-Files (1996)
- The X-Files Collector's Cube (1996) (released as "Forensic Evidence Box") (contains File 1, File 2, File 3, File 4 and Secrets of The X-Files)
- File 5 - Master Plan (File 6 in the UK) (episodes "Talitha Cumi" and "Herrenvolk) (1996)
- File 6 - Tunguska (File 7 in the UK) (episodes "Tunguska" and "Terma") (1996)
- File 7 - 82517 (File 5 in the UK) (episodes "Nisei" and "731") (1996)
- File 8 - Tempus Fugit (episodes "Tempus Fugit" and "Max") (1997)
- File 9 - Redux (episodes "Gethsemane", "Redux" and "Redux II") (1997)
- File 10 - Emily (episodes "Christmas Carol" and "Emily") (1997)
- File 11 - Patient X (episodes "Patient X" and "The Red And The Black") (1998)
- Files 12 - The End (1998)

Other VHS titles released from 1999 to 2002 include:

- Piper Maru
- One Son (1999) (episodes "Two Fathers" and "One Son")
- Millennium (2000) (episode "Millennium" plus two episode from the TV Show "Millennium")
- Biogenesis (2000) (episodes "Biogenesis", "The Sixth Extinction" and "The Sixth Extinction Amor Fati")
- Dreamland (2000) (episodes "Dreamland" and "Dreamland II)
- Closure (2000) (episodes "Sein und Zeit" and "Closure")
- Requiem (2001) (episodes "Requiem", "Within" and "Without")
- Deadalive (2001)
- Nothing Important Happened Today (2001) (episodes "Nothing Important Happened Today" and "Nothing Important Happened Today II)
- Providence (2002) (episodes "Provenance" and "Providence"; this was the final VHS release)

Also released in Australia were wave sets (1999-2001) which each VHS contains two episodes from Season One through until Season four. Only Season One and Season Two were released in a complete season set on VHS as DVDs were more popular.

== Video games ==
The X-Files has inspired four video games.

In 1997, Fox Interactive released The X-Files: Unrestricted Access, a game-style database for Windows and Mac, which allowed users access to every case file.

In 1998, The X-Files: The Game was released for the PC and Macintosh and a year later for the PlayStation. This game is set within the timeline of the second or third season and follows an Agent Craig Willmore in his search for the missing Mulder and Scully.

Then, in 2004, The X-Files: Resist or Serve was released for the PlayStation 2. This game is an original story set in the seventh season and allows the player control of both Mulder and Scully. Both games feature acting and voice work from members of the series' cast.

The most recent video game is The X-Files: Deep State, released in 2018 for iOS, Facebook, and Android platforms. The events occur between seasons 9 and 10 of The X-Files series and follow two new FBI agents as they investigate paranormal cases and uncover a sinister conspiracy. The game is no longer available to play after the Fox acquisition by Disney.

== Tabletop games ==
In 1996, The US Playing Card Company released The X-Files Collectible Card Game.

In 1997, 20th Century Fox released The X-Files Trivia Game. In the game, players roll a four-sided die to randomly select a question-category.

In 2015, IDW Games released The X-Files Board Game by noted game designer Kevin Wilson. Game play covers themes from the first three seasons of The X-Files television show and the art comes from IDW's The X-Files Season 10 comic book series. The X-Files: Trust No One Expansion is the board game's first expansion and was released in 2016. Additions include new agents, a new location, and a "Monster of the Week" mechanic. IDW also published The X-Files: Conspiracy Theory – Everything is Connected in 2018. Additionally, there are X-Files-themed versions/expansions of the card games Legendary and VS.

== Magazine ==
The X-Files spawned an official periodical, released monthly by FOX. It included articles about the series, main and guest stars (with interviews), the creators, sets and future episodes.

== Books ==
During the run of the hit TV series The X-Files, many books based on it were released, written, including novels based on episodes, a series of comic books from Topps Comics, and many "official" and "unauthorized" non-fiction books.

Some of the novels, which were published in both hardcover and trade paperback editions, came out as audiobooks read by two of the series' stars, Gillian Anderson and Mitch Pileggi.

== Comics ==
The X-Files has been the basis of a number of comics, notably a series from Topps Comics, with creators like Tony Isabella, Stefan Petrucha and Charlie Adlard. Most recently, Wildstorm has signed Frank Spotnitz to a three comic book deal, the first of which will be released two weeks before the premiere of The X-Files: I Want to Believe.

Publication history

Main series was published by Topps Comics and ran for 41 issues from January 1995 to September 1998.

There were also two limited series: Ground Zero was a four-issue mini-series (December 1997 - March 1998) and Season One which ran for 9 issues (July 1997 - July 1998).

The digest consisted of three issues published twice yearly from December 1995 - December 1996, with separate titles: "Big Foot, Warm Heart," "Dead to the World" and "Scape Goats." The first two also included stories from the Ray Bradbury Comics.

There were also a number of one-offs like the Hero Illustrated Special (March 1995), and graphic novels like Afterflight (August 1997).

Wildstorm are releasing, "The X-Files Special", in August 2008. It will be a one-shot to coincide with the release of the second film written by Frank Spotnitz with art by Brian Denham. The deal Spotnitz signed is for another two comics.

=== Plot ===
The three digests contained stories on Bigfoot being hunted, the Count of St. Germain and the chupacabra, respectively.

Afterflight dealt with elements of the mystery airship flap.

Fight the Future was the official film adaptation, "Fight the Future" being the film's subtitle, used to differentiate it from the television series.

Season One adapted some of the episodes from the first season: "Pilot", "Deep Throat", "Squeeze", "Conduit", "Ice", "Space", "Fire", "Beyond the Sea" and "Shadows". Two others, "The Jersey Devil" and "Ghost in the Machine", were solicited but never published.

Despite coinciding with the film, "The X-Files Special" won't be an adaptation but is set in what writer Frank Spotnitz calls "the classic period of the X-Files" - between Season 2 and Season 5. While this is a stand-alone story, he will be writing two more which fit into the broader conspiracy theory that developed, saying, "the next ones that I am going to write tie into the mythology of the show not in a way that changes the path but deepens it a little bit."

=== Problems ===
Tony Isabella reported difficulties with The X-Files creator Chris Carter over the Topps Comics' series:

"Whoever was approving the comics over in Chris Carter Land were the poster kids for anal retentiveness. Although it's possible that they were so picky because they never wanted the comics out there in the first place. The main reason the comics fell behind schedule was because it took so long to satisfy the X-Files people. They went over everything with a fine-tooth comb, including the letters columns. ... I rarely ran negative letters in these columns because the [Topps] editors were afraid that the X-Files people would want even more changes in the material. Almost from the start, there were never enough usable letters for our needs. That's why I started including the "Deep Postage" news items — and making up letters completely. I also wrote the Xena letters columns, but those were a lot easier to produce."

=== Collected editions ===
The series has been collected into trade paperbacks. In the UK, Titan Books did a nearly complete run but in the US Topps stopped at #12, but recently Checker Book Publishing started publishing the rest (although they restarted the numbering again).

- The X-Files Collection (Topps Comics):
  - Volume 1 (collects The X-Files #1-6 and The X-Files Heroes Illustrated Special, Berkley Publishing Group, February 1996, ISBN 1-883313-10-4)
  - Volume 2 (collects The X-Files #7-12 and Annual #1, 180 pages, February 1997, ISBN 1-883313-23-6)
- Checker Book Publishing:
  - Volume 1 (collects #13-17, Squeeze and #0 Pilot Episode, May 2005, ISBN 1-933160-02-0)
  - Volume 2 (collects #18-22, #1/2 and Digest #1, May 2005, ISBN 1-933160-03-9)
  - Volume 3 (collects #23-26, Fire, Ice and Hero Illustrated Special "Trick of the light", December 2005, ISBN 1-933160-39-X)
- Titan Books:
  - Firebird (by Stefan Petrucha, with art by Charlie Adlard, collects The X-Files #1-6, and The X-Files/Hero Illustrated Special, 1995 Trick of the Light, 160 pages, November 1995, ISBN 1-900097-08-7)
  - Project Aquarius (by Stefan Petrucha, with art by Charlie Adlard, collects The X-Files #7-9, 151 pages, August 1996, 1900097176)
  - The Haunting (by Stefan Petrucha, with art by Charlie Adlard, collects The X-Files #10-16, 160 pages, March 1997, ISBN 1-900097-23-0)
  - Night Light (by Kevin J. Anderson and John Rozum, with art by Charlie Adlard and Gordon Purcell, collects The X-Files #17- 19, 128 pages, March 1997, ISBN 1-85286-808-2)
  - Internal Affairs (by John Rozum, with art by Charlie Adlard, collects The X-Files #20-23, 128 pages, August 1997, ISBN 1-85286-809-0)
  - Remote Control (by John Rozum, with art by Charlie Adlard, collects The X-Files #24-29, 160 pages, November 1997, ISBN 1-85286-840-6)
  - Skin Deep (by John Rozum, with art by Alex Saviuk, collects The X-Files #30-33, 128 pages, April 1998, ISBN 1-85286-951-8)

Other volumes include:

- Dead to the World (by Stefan Petrucha with Charlie Adlard, collects Digests 1-3, 208 pages, April 1996, ISBN 1-900097-24-9)
- Afterflight (by Stefan Petrucha, with art by Jill Thompson, Alexander Saviuk and Rick Magyar, graphic novel, Topps, August 1997, Titan Books, October 1997, ISBN 1-85286-860-0)

== Posters ==
The X-Files have spawned a number of popular posters from the series, from likenesses of the cast to the "I want to believe" poster.

The "I want to believe" poster hanging in Mulder's basement FBI X-Files office was actually changed after the first season. Viewers wanting the poster created quite a demand, but the first season version was created by the X-files' production team as a one-off poster and it couldn't be mass-produced. In season 2 it was switched to another UFO poster that the X-files store could sell.

== Online service ==
In 1994, Delphi was the official online service of The X-Files. They hosted X-Files chats in a time before the popularity of the World Wide Web.

== Millennium merchandise ==
=== Books ===
Several novels based on Millennium episodes have been written:

1. The Frenchman, by Elizabeth Hand (1.00 "Pilot")
2. Gehenna, by Lewis Gannett (1.01 "Gehenna")
3. Force Majeure, by Lewis Gannett (1.12 "Force Majeure")
4. Weeds, by Victor Koman (1.10 "Weeds")
5. The Wild And the Innocent, by Elizabeth Massie (1.09 "The Wild And the Innocent")

Some titles were also released as audiobooks read by actor Bill Smitrovitch.

=== Soundtracks ===
As of 2009, two soundtrack albums by Mark Snow have been released. The first ("The Best of Millennium") was released in 2003 on iTunes only. It comprised 22 tracks from all three seasons. The second was released in 2008 as a limited edition 2-CD set of 2000 copies by La-La-Land Records. It comprised 51 tracks. Some of the tracks on the two releases are the same.

=== Action figure ===
A 12-inch Frank Black (Lance Henriksen) figurine (ASIN: B0007XOF2O) was issued by Sideshow in the same mold as X-Files Agents Fox Mulder and Dana Scully. The Frank Black (Lance Henriksen) figure features over 30 points of articulation and includes a Webley revolver, old school .45 & holster, pager, cell phone, flashlight, Millennium case file with photos, and an X-Files 12-inch figure display base. It can be purchased on most common auction and marketplace websites.

=== Home video releases ===
On 28 October 2008, 20th Century Fox released Millennium: The Complete Series—an 18 disc boxset featuring all 68 episodes of the series.

| Season | Nr of episodes | Extra features | Release date |
|---|---|---|---|
| '1st' (1996–1997) | 22 | Commentary by Chris Carter on "The Pilot", Commentary by director David Nutter on Gehenna, "Order in Chaos: Making Millennium Season One" documentary, "Chasing the Dragon: A Conversation with the Academy Group": a look at real-life profilers, Creating the logo and title sequence, Pilot TV spots. | July 20, 2004 |
| '2nd' (1997–1998) | 23 | Commentary on two episodes by director Thomas J. Wright and writer Michael R. Perry, "The Turn of the Tide: Making of Season Two" featurette, "Academy Group: Victimology" featurette. | January 4, 2005 |
| '3rd' (1998–1999) | 22 | Commentary by Lance Henriksen and Klea Scott on The Innocents, Commentary by director Thomas J. Wright on Collateral Damage, Bonus episode: The X-Files season 7 episode "Millennium", "End Game: Making Millennium Season 3" documentary, "Between the Lines" featurette. | September 6, 2005 |
