= Beyond the Sea =

Beyond the Sea may refer to:

== Music ==
- "Beyond the Sea" (song), a popular 1946 song
- Beyond the Sea (Dark Moor album), 2005
- Beyond the Sea (K album), 2006
- Beyond the Sea, a 2004 album by Frank Marocco

== Film and television ==
- Beyond the Sea (2004 film), a film about Bobby Darin starring Kevin Spacey
- Beyond the Sea (1991 film), an Israeli drama film
- Beyond the Sea (audio drama), an audio drama based on the TV series Doctor Who
- "Beyond the Sea" (Generator Rex), an episode of Generator Rex
- "Beyond the Sea" (The X-Files), an episode of The X-Files
- "Beyond the Sea" (Black Mirror), an episode of Black Mirror
