= I'll Be There (Bright song) =

Single by Bright

from the album Notes 4 You
- Released: November 19, 2008
- Genre: J-pop
- Label: Rhythm Zone

Bright singles chronology
| ""Tegami feat.K / One Summer Time"" (2008) | "I'll Be There" (2008) | "Kotoba ni Dekinakute/Shining Butterfly" (2009) |

"I'll Be There" is the third single the vocal group Bright released under a major label named Rhythm Zone. The song Killing Me Softly with His Song is a cover song from Roberta Flack (originally sung by Lori Lieberman). I'll be there ranked weekly on the Oricon ranking on #48 and sold 2,127 in its first week.

== Track listings ==
=== CD track list ===
1. I'll Be There
2. Killing Me Softly With His Song
3. Itsu made mo – Happy Winter version
4. I'll Be There (instrumental)
5. Killing Me Softly With His Song (instrumental)
6. Itsu made mo – Happy Winter version (instrumental)

=== DVD track list ===
1. I’ll Be There /music video
2. One Summer Time /live video from Big Cat, Aug. 25th 2008
3. Watch Out /live video from Big Cat, Aug. 25th 2008
4. I’ll Be There /making video

== Chart ==
| Daily | Weekly | Sales |
|---|---|---|
| 34 | 48 | 2,127 |
