= In Harmony =

In Harmony may refer to:

== Film ==
- A 2015 French film titled En équilibre, known in English as In Harmony

== Music ==
- In Harmony (music education project), a community development project in England
- In Harmony (compilation albums), two compilation albums of children's music, released in 1980 and 1982
- In Harmony (Bright album), 2010
- In Harmony, a 1979 album by Mary O'Hara
- In Harmony a 1999 album by Ladysmith Black Mambazo
- In Harmony (Roy Hargrove & Mulgrew Miller album), 2021
