= Sorairo =

Single by Bright

from the album Notes 4 You
- Released: April 9, 2008
- Genre: J-pop
- Label: Rhythm Zone

Bright singles chronology
"Brightest e.p.02" (2007)	"Sorairo" (2008)	"'Tegami feat.K / One Summer Time'" (2008)

Sorairo (ソライロ) is the first single the vocal group Bright released under a major label named Rhythm Zone. The single got weekly the #45 spot on the Oricon ranking and sold 1,630 copies in its first week.

== Track listing ==
CD track list

1. Sora Iro (ソライロ)
2. My Girl
3. Stay
4. ソライロ(instrumental)
5. My Girl(instrumental)
6. Stay(instrumental)

DVD track list

1. Sora Iro Music Video (with dance introduction)
2. Girls Party Time Live Video (Rhythm Nation 2007)
3. 2008.01.21 Bright Debut Premium Live: Brightest Star Live Document Clip
