= Tegami / One Summer Time =

Single by Bright

from the album Notes 4 You
- Released: July 16, 2008
- Genre: J-pop
- Label: Rhythm Zone

Bright singles chronology
"Sorairo" (2008)	"Tegami / One Summer Time" (2008)	"I'll Be There" (2008)

"Tegami" is the second single the vocal group Bright released under a major label named Rhythm Zone. The song Tegami is a ballad collaboration song between Bright and the Korean J-pop singer K. The single got weekly the #39 spot on the Oricon ranking and sold 1,941 copies in its first week.

== Track listing ==
1. Tegami feat. K (手紙; Letter)
2. One Summer Time
3. Stay
4. Free Your Mind
5. Brightest Star Cubismo Grafico remix
6. Tegami feat. K (instrumental)
7. One Summer Time (instrumental)
8. Free Your Mind (instrumental)

=== DVD track list ===
1. 手紙 feat. K (music video)
2. One Summer Time (music video)
3. 手紙 feat. K (making-off video)

== Chart ==
Daily	Weekly	Sales
26	39	1,941
