= The X-Files: Revelations =

- Region 1 DVD cover
- No. of episodes: 8

The X-Files: Revelations collection is a DVD release containing selected episodes from the first to the sixth seasons of the American science fiction television series The X-Files. Released on July 8, 2008, the collection has received mostly positive response from critics. The episodes collected in the release were chosen by writers Chris Carter and Frank Spotnitz, and include entries in the series' overarching mythology, as well as standalone Monster-of-the-Week stories. Spotnitz intended the release to act as an entry point for viewers new to the series. In some markets, the collection was released under the name The X-Files: Essentials.

== Production ==
The episodes on the collection represent the personal choices of series writers Chris Carter and Frank Spotnitz, who recorded introductions for each of their selections. Spotnitz wanted the collection to serve as an introduction to the series for those who were unfamiliar with it, noting "if you were so motivated you could go back and look at these eight episodes and really get an idea of the breadth and scope of the series".

== Reception ==
The X-Files: Revelations was released on July 8, 2008—July 14 in region 2—and received mostly positive reviews from critics. Writing for IGN, Christopher Monfette described the release as "a cash-in" on the then-upcoming release of The X-Files: I Want to Believe. Monfette felt that the collection suffered for its lack of an cohesive theme tying its episodes together, and rated it a score of 5 out of 10. Jack Patrick Rodgers, writing for PopMatters, felt that the collection served to "remind us of how great the show was at its peak", awarding it a score of 8 out of 10. However, Rodgers found fault with the bare-bones natures of the collection, writing that its presentation "does little to dispel the notion that it's a cheap cash-in for [I Want to Believe]". David Sutton of Fortean Times rated the collection—which was titled The X-Files: Essentials in the United Kingdom—four stars out of five, calling it "well worth a punt" for newcomers to The X-Files. However, Sutton found it difficult to pinpoint the release's target audience, pointing out that the series was known for its alien-related mythology, which he felt the collection downplayed in favour of "writerly" episodes. DVD Talk's Randy Miller recommended the set, calling it "a reminder of Carter and company's commitment to variety", and finding the bonus material to be scant but worthwhile.

== Episodes ==
No. in set	No. in series	Title	Directed by	Written by	Original release date	Prod. code
1	1	"Pilot"	Robert Mandel	Chris Carter	September 10, 1993	1X79
Agent Dana Scully (Gillian Anderson) is assigned to work with Agent Fox Mulder (David Duchovny) on the X-Files in an attempt to debunk his work on the paranormal. Their first case has them investigating apparent alien abductions. A near comatose man, Billy Miles (Zachary Ansley), is taking his classmates, including Theresa Nemman (Sarah Koskoff), into the woods, where they are killed in a flash of bright light. Also guest stars Cliff DeYoung, Leon Russom, and Alexandra Stewart.
2	13	"Beyond the Sea"	David Nutter	Glen Morgan & James Wong	January 7, 1994	1X12
A death row inmate named Luther Lee Boggs claims that he is psychic and can lead Mulder to a serial killer in exchange for a lesser sentence of life in prison. The agents' roles are reversed in this episode, with Mulder doubting Boggs's claim and Scully believing him after she is told that she can communicate through him with her recently deceased father. Guest starring Brad Dourif, Don S. Davis and Sheila Larken.
3	26	"The Host"	Daniel Sackheim	Chris Carter	September 23, 1994	2X02
When a man's decomposed body is found in the sewers of Newark, Mulder is given the supposed "grunt" work. But after Scully's autopsy turns up a parasite living inside the body and a sewer worker is attacked and bitten by something, it opens up a whole new can of worms.
4	53	"Clyde Bruckman's Final Repose"	David Nutter	Darin Morgan	October 13, 1995	3X04
Skeptical of a famous psychic's predictions regarding the murder of several prognosticators, Mulder instead finds someone who he believes truly can predict the future. Catching the killer could prove difficult, though, particularly if the murderer can also see into his future. Guest starring Peter Boyle.
5	87	"Memento Mori"	Rob Bowman	Chris Carter & Vince Gilligan & John Shiban & Frank Spotnitz	February 9, 1997	4X15
Fear for Scully's health sends Mulder to investigate the bizarre circumstances that may explain her mysterious abduction two years ago, while Scully takes a more practical course to quell her illness.
6	102	"The Post-Modern Prometheus"	Chris Carter	Chris Carter	November 30, 1997	5X06
Filmed in black-and-white, "The Post-Modern Prometheus" chronicles Mulder and Scully's investigation when a letter from a single mother leads them to a small mid-Western town where a modern-day version of Frankenstein's monster lurks, Jerry Springer is an obsession, and Cher plays a significant part.
7	109	"Bad Blood"	Cliff Bole	Vince Gilligan	February 22, 1998	5X12
While investigating bizarre exsanguinations in Texas, Mulder kills a teenage boy whom he "mistakes" for a vampire. Awaiting a meeting with Skinner, Mulder and Scully attempt to get their stories "straight" by relating to each other their differing versions of what happened during their investigation. Gillian Anderson voted this her favorite episode.
8	135	"Milagro"	Kim Manners	Story by : John Shiban & Frank Spotnitz; Teleplay by : Chris Carter	April 18, 1999	6ABX18
A series of murders takes place where the heart has been removed from the victims. A writer that lives next door to Mulder is writing a novel about the murders before they actually happen. Scully finds herself confused and drawn to the writer, who has a romantic interest in her.

== Special features ==
The X-Files: Revelations
Set Details		Special Features	
8 Episodes; 2-Disc Set; 1.33:1 aspect ratio (episodes 1–5); 1.78:1 aspect ratio (episodes 6–8); Subtitles: English; English (Dolby Digital 2.0 Surround); French (Dolby Digital 2.0 Surround)		Introduction to each episode by series creator Chris Carter and executive producer Frank Spotnitz; WonderCon talent panel featuring David Duchovny, Gillian Anderson, Chris Carter, and Frank Spotnitz; Theatrical trailer for the second X-Files movie	
Release Dates
United States; Canada	Australia	Japan	United Kingdom
July 8, 2008	TBA	TBA	July 14, 2008
