= Real (Bright album) =

Studio album by Bright
- Released: February 24, 2010
- Genre: J-pop
- Label: Rhythm Zone; Catalog number:RZCD-46452

Bright chronology
Notes 4 You (2009)	Real (2010)	In Harmony (2010)

Real (リアル, Riaru) is the second studio album from Bright under the Rhythm Zone record label of the Avex Group, released on 24 February 2010. The album came in three versions: a CD+DVD version, a CD only version, and a CD only version with different cover art (only available to the Kinki region of Japan). With the first press of the CD+DVD and CD only versions came a poster. The album sold 4,437 copies in its first week, peaking at #38 on the Oricon charts.

Football Hour's Nozomu Iwao starred in the album's commercial advertisement.

== Track listing ==
1. Theme of Bright ～Real～
2. I Like That
3. キライ…でも好き ～アイシテル～
4. Shining Butterfly
5. Kotoba ni Dekinakute
6. Warm It Up (Interlude)
7. Dance With Us
8. I Know
9. Secret
10. Feelin' You
11. Promise You
12. 美女と野獣 (bonus track)

DVD track list

1. Kotoba ni Dekinakute(MV)
2. Shining Butterfly (MV)
3. Feelin' You (MV)
4. キライ…でも好き ～アイシテル～(MV)
5. Document Video (August 2009)

== Charts ==
Chart	Peak position	Reported sales
Oricon Daily Chart	24	
Oricon Weekly Chart	38	6,400
