= The Timeless Collection Vol. 1 =

Studio album by K
- Released: March 21, 2007
- Genre: English
- Length: 55:38
- Label: Studioseven Recordings

K chronology
Music in My Life (2006)	The Timeless Collection Vol. 1 (2007)

The Timeless Collection Vol. 1 is the first English cover album by J-Pop artist K. Each of his seven singles released so far contained a cover of an English, and now those songs are compiled into this album along with other songs. Also included on this album are the songs "True Colors", Sony Ericsson commercial theme, and "Honesty", a song featured on the tribute album "Wanna Be the Piano Man." The album also features two live tracks and is released in CD+DVD and CD-only versions. The DVD includes clips of live performances.

== Track listing ==
=== CD ===
#	Track Name	Length
1.	True Colors: Original: Cyndi Lauper; Sony Ericsson commercial theme song	3:58
2.	Layla: Original: Derek and the Dominos	6:09
3.	Just the Two of Us: Original: Bill Withers with Grover Washington, Jr.; featured on the single Girlfriend	3:31
4.	Da Ya Think I'm Sexy?: Original: Rod Stewart; featured on the single Brand New Map	3:32
5.	Angel: Original: Aerosmith	5:05
6.	Honesty: Original: Billy Joel; featured on the tribute album Wanna Be the Piano Man	3:52
7.	Steppin' Out: Original: Joe Jackson; featured on the single Only Human	4:41
8.	Just Once: Original: James Ingram; featured on the single Dakishimetai	3:47
9.	I Like It: Original: DeBarge; featured on the single The Day	4:48
10.	One Last Cry: Original: Brian McKnight; featured on the single over...	3:23
11.	Every Year, Every Christmas: Original: Luther Vandross; featured on the single First Christmas	5:10
12.	Back at One (live): Original: Brian McKnight	4:32
13.	Bridge over Troubled Water feat.Peabo Bryson (live): Original: Simon and Garfunkel	5:54

=== DVD ===
1. Back Stage
2. Just Once
3. Interview #01
4. I Like It
5. Honesty
6. Interview #02
7. Just the Two of Us
8. Back Stage
9. One Last Cry
10. Back Stage
