= Kotoba ni Dekinakute/Shining Butterfly =

Single by Bright

from the album Real
- Released: May 20, 2009
- Genre: J-pop
- Label: Rhythm Zone

Bright singles chronology
"I'll Be There" (2008)	"Kotoba ni Dekinakute/Shining Butterfly" (2009)	"'Feelin' You'" (2009)

"Kotoba ni Dekinakute/Shining Butterfly" is the fourth single by the vocal group Bright. The bridge of "Shining Butterfly" drew comparisons to Janet Jackson's "Feedback," using a similar melody.

This single includes a cover of "(You Make Me Feel Like) A Natural Woman", originally performed by Aretha Franklin.

== Track listing ==
CD track list

1. Kotoba ni Dekinakute (言葉にできなくて; Can't Put into Words)
2. Shining Butterfly
3. (You Make Me Feel Like A) Natural Woman
4. 言葉にできなくて(instrumental）
5. Shining Butterfly(instrumental）
6. (You Make Me Feel Like A) Natural Woman(instrumental）

DVD track list

1. 言葉にできなくて (music video)
2. Shining Butterfly (music video)
3. Theme of Bright: Notes 4 You／Love & Joy (live video) From Big Cat, March 20, 2009
4. Bonus Track 言葉にできなくて (making-of video)

== Chart ==
Daily	Weekly	Sales
48	64	1,381
