= Music in My Life =

Studio album by K
- Released: December 13, 2006
- Genre: J-Pop
- Length: 57:42
- Label: Sony Music Associated Records

K chronology
Beyond the Sea (2006)	Music in My Life (2006)	The TIMELESS Collection VOL.1 (2007)

CD-only cover

Music in My Life is the second Japanese album of K. Despite the success of his first album, Beyond the Sea, his single sales have been dropping after the 1 Litre of Tears heat died down, as a result, the album only made it to an average #25 on the Oricon Album Charts. It was released in CD+DVD and CD-only versions. The CD+DVD version features live clips from his performance at NHK Hall in May 2006 and includes a bonus, 24-page color photobook.

== Track listing ==
=== CD ===
#	Track Name	Length
1.	Music in My Life	3:17
2.	ファースト・クリスマス (First Christmas)	5:44
3.	Again feat.黒沢 薫 (ゴスペラーズ) (Again feat. Kaoru Kurosawa (Gospellers))	4:10
4.	Together Forever ～album version～	4:06
5.	Brand New Map	5:28
6.	Thirsty	4:05
7.	Last Love	4:49
8.	Stay Right Here	5:34
9.	朝の光、風の匂い (Asa no Hikari, Kaze no Nioi)	5:10
10.	The Day	5:13
11.	Blue	4:40
12.	星の想い (Hoshi no Omoi)	5:26

=== DVD ===
1. Together Forever
2. 抱きしめたい (Dakishimetai)
3. over...
4. Play Another One
5. Only Human
6. Bye My Friends
