= Feelin' You (Bright song) =

Single by Bright

from the album Real
- Released: August 5, 2009
- Genre: J-pop, bubblegum pop, R&B
- Label: Rhythm Zone

Bright singles chronology
"Kotoba ni Dekinakute/Shining Butterfly" (2009)	"Feelin' You" (2009)	"Kirai... Demo Suki: Aishiteru" (2010)

"Feelin' You" is the fifth single by dance vocal band Bright, released under Rhythm Zone. The title track "Feelin' You" is a summer pop song. The song "Still..." is written by Megumi making it the first song written by a member of the group. "Dream Girls" is a cover of the well-known theme song for the musical and movie Dreamgirls.

== Track listing ==
CD Only
No.	Title	Length
1.	"Feelin' You"
2.	"Still..."
3.	"Dream Girls"
4.	"Feelin' You (Instrumental)"
5.	"Still... (Instrumental)"
6.	"Dream Girls (Instrumental)"

DVD
No.	Title	Length
1.	"Feelin' You (Music Video)"
2.	"So Long, Too Late (Live Videpo"
3.	"Tegami (手紙, Letter) (Live Video)"
4.	"Feelin' You (Making Video) (First Press Exclusive)"

== Charts ==
Chart (1999)	Peak position	Total sales
Oricon Singles Chart	76	1,278
