= Bright (Japanese band) =

Japanese dance vocal band

- Origin: Japan
- Genres: Pop, R&B, Gospel
- Years active: 2001-2013
- Label: Rhythm Zone (2008-present)
- Past members: Nagisa Shigemura (Nagi); Mizuki Inoue (Mi-Mi); Megumi Nakaya (Meg); Nanaka Kobayashi
- Website: http://www.bright-online.net/

Bright (stylized as BRIGHT) was a dance vocal band in Japan under major label Rhythm Zone.

== History ==
The chorus group named Ko Spellers (子スペラーズ) was formed in 2001 with the members Nagi, Mi-Mi and Meg. These members of the group were childhood friends from elementary school. In 2003, they decided to expand the group into a 4-member group. Nanaka Kobayashi joined and the band changed its name to Bright.

On April 25, 2007, the band debuted on Rhythm Republic, Avex Group's indies label. As their popularity grew, they were transferred to the major label Rhythm Zone. On January 16, 2008, the band released their first major label mini-album named Brightest Star.

The group worked with singer K for their first full-length album named Notes 4 You.

On April 17, 2013, it was announced on the group's blog that Bright would disband after their final One Man Live concert on May 12.

== Members ==
- Nagisa Shigemura (重村渚, born August 2, 1990, in Hyogo Prefecture)
- Mizuki Inoue (井上みづき, born September 28, 1990, in Osaka Prefecture)
- Megumi Nakaya (中谷萌美, born March 6, 1991, in Osaka Prefecture)
- Nanaka Kobayashi (小林菜々香, born May 30, 1992, in Osaka Prefecture)

== Discography ==
=== Albums ===
- Notes 4 You (Released January 14, 2009) #47 on Oricon
- Real (February 24, 2010) #38 on Oricon
- In Harmony (October 20, 2010)
- Bright (March 21, 2012)
- Bright Best (August 22, 2012)

=== EPs ===
- Brightest e.p.01 (Released April 25, 2007)
- Brightest e.p.02 (Released August 8, 2007)
- Brightest Star (Released January 16, 2008) #133 on Oricon

=== Singles ===
- "Sorairo" (Released April 9, 2008) #45 on Oricon
- "Tegami"/"One Summer Time" (Released July 16, 2008) #39 on Oricon
- "I'll Be There" (Released November 19, 2008) #48 on Oricon
- "Kotoba ni Dekinakute"/"Shining Butterfly" (Released May 20, 2009) #64 on Oricon
- "Feelin' You" (Released August 5, 2009) #76 on Oricon
- "Love: Aru Ai no Katachi"
- "Bad Girl!!" feat. SKY-HI(AAA) / "Autabi ni Suki ni Natte" (Released November 23, 2011) #48 on Oricon with 3,000 sales
- "Kimi ga Iru Kara: Kokoro no Tonari de" (Released February 15, 2012)

=== Digital Singles ===
- "Kirai...Demo Suki: Aishiteru"
- "Flower"
- "Shining Star"
