= K (South Korean singer) =

South Korean singer (born 1983)

Kang Yoonsung
- Born: Kang Yoon-sung; November 16, 1983 (age 42); South Korea
- Origin: South Korea
- Genres: J-pop; R&B
- Occupation: Singer
- Instruments: Singing; Piano
- Years active: 2004–2010; 2013–
- Label: JVCKenwood Victor Entertainment
- Website: https://k-official.jp/

Kang Yoon-sung (born November 16, 1983), is a South Korean singer under contract in Japan. He was born in Goyang. In 2004, after achieving little success with his first album in South Korea, Kang crossed over to Japan. His first Japanese album, Beyond the Sea, has achieved a sales of over 300,000 copies.

Kang put his musical activities on hold in 2010 so he could complete the Korean mandatory military service.

== Discography ==
=== Japanese studio albums ===
Year	Album Information	Chart positions	Total sales
2006	Beyond the Sea: Released: January 18, 2006; Label: Sony (SRCL-6221)	2	142,000
2006	Music in My Life: Released: December 13, 2006; Label: Sony (SRCL-6454)	25	22,000
2009	Traveling Song: Released: March 18, 2009; Label: Sony (SRCL-6985)	44	4,500

=== Other Japanese albums ===
Year	Album Information	Chart positions	Total sales
2007	The Timeless Collection Vol. 1: Cover album; Released: March 21, 2007; Label: Sony (SRCL-6503)	42	6,000
2009	Merry Christmas: Christmas extended play; Released: December 2, 2009; Label: Sony (SRCL-7189)	63	3,100
2010	K-Best: Greatest hits album; Released: December 1, 2010; Label: Sony (SRCL-7442)	22	9,500
2013	641: Extended play; Released: June 10, 2013; Label: Sony (SRCL-8274)	38	

=== English albums ===
Year	Album Information	Chart positions	Total sales
2014	On My Journey: Cover album; Released: June 16, 2014; Label: Sony (SRCL-8551)	67	
2015	Ear Food: Cover album; Released: August 5, 2015; Label: Sony (SRCL-8856)	71	

=== Korean albums ===
1. K (April 28, 2004)
2. Beautiful Smile (January 20, 2006)

=== Singles ===
==== As lead artist ====
Release	Title	Chart positions	Total sales	Album
2005	"Over..."	5	168,000	Beyond the Sea
2005	"Dakishimetai" (抱きしめたい; "I Want to Hold You")	10	31,000	Beyond the Sea
2005	"Girlfriend"	19	10,000	Beyond the Sea
2005	"Only Human"	5	200,000	Beyond the Sea
2006	"The Day"	14	13,000	Music in My Life
2006	"Brand New Map"	20	14,000	Music in My Life
2006	"First Christmas" (ファースト・クリスマス, Fāsuto Kurisumasu)	25	12,000	Music in My Life
2007	"Birth of Treasure"	42	3,800	Traveling Song
2007	"Kono Uta o........" (この歌を・・・・・・・・♪; "This Song") (K x ET-King)	19	10,000	Traveling Song
2008	"Play and Pray"	48	2,700	Traveling Song
2008	"525600 Min. (Seasons of Love)"	49	2,100	Traveling Song
2010	"Aitai Kara" (会いたいから; "Because I Miss You")	33	3,600	K-Best
2010	"Dear..."	24	4,500	K-Best
2013	"Christmas Time Again"	70		On My Journey
2015	"Years"	—		Ear Food
2016	"Ano kumo no mukō-gawa" (あの雲の向こう側; "Beyond that cloud")	67		Non-album single
2017	"Shain" (シャイン; "Shine")	44		Non-album single
2017	"Kiridansu no uta" (桐箪笥のうた; "Song of Kiri Tansu")	—		Non-album single

==== As featured artist ====
Release	Artist	Title	Chart positions	Total sales	Album
2008	Bright feat. K	"Tegami"	39	2,300	Notes 4 You
2010	Tatsuya Ishii feat. K	"Ocean Drive"	37	3,100	Non-album single

=== DVDs ===
- Film K: A Voice from the Heaven (February 15, 2006)
- Film K Vol. 2: Music in My Life (June 25, 2008)
- film K vol.3 live K in 武道館〜so long〜 20101130 (March 2, 2011)

=== Other appearances ===
- Wanna Be the Piano Man: "Honesty" (オネスティ, Onesuti) (November 29, 2006)
- Céline Dion Tribute: "To Love You More (featuring Aki)" (September 26, 2007)

== Live tours ==
- Live K Tour 2006: Beyond the Sea (March – May 2006)
- Live K Tour 2006: Winter (November – December 2006)
- Live K Tour 2007: Music in My Life (June 2007)
- Live K Tour 2008: Ki zu na (June 2008)
- Live K Tour 2009 (March – May 2009)
