= The X-Files Collectible Card Game =

Collectible card game

- Card back to the X-Files CCG
- Designers: Duncan Macdonell, Ron Kent, David Scott Frank (III), David May, Andy Graumann, Lynette Schmitt, NXT Games
- Publishers: US Playing Card Company
- Players: 2
- Setup time: < 1 minute
- Playing time: ~1 hour
- Chance: Low
- Skills: Resource management, Deck optimization, Planning

The X-Files Collectible Card Game is an out-of-print collectible card game based on The X-Files fictional universe. The game was developed by NXT Games and published by the US Playing Card Company (USPCC) in 1996. The game was canceled in early 1998.

== Gameplay ==
The X-Files Collectible Card Game is played between two players using constructed decks of cards representing characters, equipment, events, and locations derived from the television show. At the onset of the game, each player selects one of the 41 possible X-File cards and places it face-down. The game's objective is to be the first player to correctly ascertain the identity of their opponent's secret X-File card. To gather clues about the facedown X-File card, players allocate a Team of Agent cards to investigate Sites. If the Team of Agents can successfully fulfill the Site investigation requirements, they may ask a characteristic question about the opponent's X-File card (ex. "Is your X-File's Affiliation Alien?" or "Is your X-File's Motive Survival?"). Players can attempt to hinder their opponent's investigation by playing Events, Bluffs, and Adversary cards from their own constructed Bureau Decks.

The X-Files Collectible Card Game can be played using either the Basic or Advanced gameplay procedures. Each starter deck includes two detailed manuals: the Official Rules and Procedures Manual for basic gameplay and the Advanced Rules and Procedures Manual for advanced gameplay. Key differences between Basic and Advanced gameplay are that Agent and Adversary game effects, Resource and Conspiracy Pools, and combat are only applicable to Advanced gameplay. Each round, or turn, in the game is composed of seven phases: Briefing, Healing, Requisition, Deployment, Case Assignment, Investigation, and Debriefing.

== Card Types ==
The X-Files Collectible Card Game features nine distinct cards types, or suits:

- X-File: Featuring a case entity from The X-Files television series that symbolizes the dark forces underpinning the cases investigated by Mulder and Scully, each of these cards has four identifying characteristics (Affiliation, Motive, Method, and Result) about which opposing players will pose questions to determine their opponent's chosen X-File card in order to win the game. Each card represents a specific episode from the television series.
- Agent: The nemesis of the above-mentioned X-File card. While X-Files attempt to maintain their secrecy, the Agents seek to identify them. Each Agent card features a list of skills (ex. Criminal Investigation, Evidence Collection, Subterfuge), a Health rating to indicate how much damage the Agent can sustain before being Hospitalized, and a Resource Number (RES) to indicate the number of Resource Points (RP) the Agent can contribute to the Resource during the Briefing Phase.
- Adversary: An antagonist that hinders the opposing Agents by engaging in Combat. Each Adversary card has specific Activators requirements indicating when it is permissible to play. Like the Agent cards, each Adversary has a Health rating, along with Long Range Combat and Close Range Combat skills.
- Witness: Most of these cards serve to aid the investigating Agents by modifying skill checks, though a smaller subset of Witness cards will generate Resource Points or negate certain types of Adversaries.
- Site: These cards form the basis of each player's investigations and feature a Prerequisite (ex. Alien Investigation 4+, Bureaucracy 4+) that must be satisfied by the investigating Team of Agents. The second notable component of each Site cards is a listed Question Type that may be asked of the opposing player's chosen X-File card, provided the investigating Team successfully meets the Prerequisite.
- Event: Some Event cards will hinder the Truth-seeking Agents whiles other Event cards may be used to aid the Agent complete their investigations.
- Bluff: These cards are used to deter the opposing Agents from successfully investigating Sites, typically by subtracting from the Team's skill checks or forcing the opposing player to discard valuable cards from his/her hand. In the Advanced gameplay, face-down Bluffs may be attached to a Site during the Case Assignment Phase to give the opponent pause to consider the risks of sending vulnerable Agents to the Site.
- Equipment: Attached to Agents during the Requisition Phase, Equipment cards are distinct from most Witness cards because the former can permanently modify a skill for as long as the Agent is in possession of the Equipment.
- Combat: Used only in Advanced gameplay, these cards modify the results of Combat during the Combat Subroutine portion of the Investigation Phase. Some Combat cards will aid the investigating Agents while others will benefit certain Adversaries. Combat cards were the only card suit not included in the game's sole expansion, 101361, and no exclusive Combat cards were included in The Truth is Out There 2nd Edition set.

== History ==
The Premiere Edition of The X-Files CCG was released in 1996 and debuted at Gen Con. 80 million cards were initially shipped on November 1, 1996. The game was developed by NXT Games and slated to be published by Donruss. With the sale of Donruss to Pinnacle Entertainment, the licensing rights were transferred to the United States Playing Card Company (USPCC). Over the next year, USPCC would create the first expansion, codenamed 101361 (after Fox Mulder's fictional birthday), a 2nd edition set known as The Truth Is Out There, and a number of promotional cards. A second expansion, codenamed 22364 (after Dana Scully's fictional birthday) and comprising roughly 138 cards, was in development when the game was terminated in early 1998. Three collector sets were also cancelled.

NXT Games had planned an expansion set based on the impending film The X-Files: Fight the Future.

== Sets ==
=== Official Sets ===
The following editions and expansion of The X-Files CCG were developed and released by USPCC:

- Premiere (November 1996) – This first edition of The X-Files CCG had a print run of roughly 80-million cards. The set contained 354 distinct cards. Card images and concepts were taken from the first two seasons of the X-Files.
  - The starter decks came with both Basic and Advanced rule booklets, with some cards being marked with a green "X" in the upper left corner indicating they were intended for Advanced games only. Each 60-card starter deck came with one of five 20-card banded packs "keyed to one character", plus 40 random common, uncommon and rare cards.
  - Booster packs contained 15 random cards. Ultra-rare cards could be found only in booster packs, randomly replacing one of the rares in the pack. Ultra-rare cards included photo variants of Agent Fox Mulder, Agent Dana Scully, Agent Alex Krycek, and Assistant Director Walter Skinner, as well as cards for Deep Throat, X, The Lone Gunmen, and such pivotal events from the first two seasons as seen on "Dana Scully, Abducted" (when Scully is taken captive by Duane Barry in "Ascension" (2x06)) and "Skinner Chooses a Side" (when Skinner confronts Mr. X inside the elevator in "End Game" (2x17)).
- 101361 Expansion (1997) – This 125-card expansion set, named after Fox Mulder's birthday, contained images and concepts from the third season of the X-Files. The set included five ultra-rare cards, and was notable for including no Combat or X-File cards. The 125-card set was sold in 12-card booster packs.
- The Truth Is Out There (1997) – This 354-card set, named after the tagline from the show, is the second edition of the core set. Thirty cards were removed from the Premiere list, including all ten ultra-rare cards and twenty rare cards. To foster collectability with this 2nd Edition set, twenty all-new exclusive rare cards and ten ultra-rare cards (the latter of which included Witness cards for such familial characters as Margaret Scully, Melissa Scully, and Mrs. Mulder).
  - The release of The Truth Is Out There (TTIOT) Edition served to address collation problems and general complaints regarding the Premiere Edition. Firstly, the 41 X-File cards were only made available in the starter decks, which alleviated the problem of users acquiring an inordinate amount of these non-playable cards from booster packs. Secondly, the 50-card banded packs were better organized, and the backside of each TTIOT starter deck box featured a hole that revealed a number between 1 and 6, to better inform the buyer of which distinct cards were found within.
  - In order to make collecting more attractive and to make certain scarce cards more readily available, the rarity of many cards (most notably the Sites) was changed from rare to uncommon, or vice versa.
- Promos (1996, 1997) – Over twenty promotional cards were made available through various gaming magazines, such as Scrye and Inquest. Unlike the regularly released cards, the Bureau File Number begins with "PR" rather than "XF". The "Teamwork" Event promo card was available as a box-topper for the 101361 Expansion. Two non-English promos, "Die Hand Die Verletzt" and "Je Vois Quelque Chose Là Au-Dessous" were available in Germany and France, respectively. Although its Bureau File Number lacks the customary "PR" prefix, The Truth Is Out There version of "The Gregors" was inadvertently omitted from TTIOT 2nd Edition (a mistake for which David Scott Frank (III) has claimed partial responsibility) and the card was subsequently released as a promo.

== Unreleased Cards & Prototypes ==
=== Gen Con Demonstration Deck (1996) ===
A couple hundred copies of this 60-card demonstration deck were used at Gen Con '96 to attract potential players. These demo decks were intended to be returned following the demonstration and subsequently destroyed, however some were not returned and have occasionally surfaced for sale on eBay and within Facebook groups dedicated to the game. There are two versions of the Gen Con demonstration deck, one that was banded together, and the other contained in a white box labelled "Top Secret/Classified". These cards possess a number of unique features that make both versions of these rare decks highly sought after by fans and collectors, such as the following:

- Preliminary layout designs, and rough-looking Conspiracy and Resource Point graphics.
- The backside of these Gen Con cards reads, "For Demonstration Purposes Only".
- Two of these demo cards, "Alien Technology" and "Fighter Interceptor", were later released as promotional cards.
- Alternate images on many of the cards, most notably "Dana Scully", "The Cigarette Smoking Man", "Abduction", "Poltergeist Attack", and "High Resolution Camera".
- Alternate titles, such as "Paper Shackles", "Nokia 121 Cellular Phone", and "Frozen Submarine, Alaska".
- The most notable of these 60 cards (and most sought after) is "Scully's Dream, Georgetown, MD" (which was later revised to "Northeast Georgetown Medical Center, Washington, DC").
- Each card is individually numbered, in the format "XF96-00XX GCon".

=== 22364 Expansion ===
This unfinished 138-card expansion set, named after Scully's birthday, was primarily based on the third season of The X-Files (but included a small handful of cards derived from the show's two earliest seasons). No Equipment cards were included as part of this set, and only one Combat card was planned as a promo. Notable highlights of this planned expansion included the following:

- Agent cards for such memorable characters as Agent Frank Burst ("Pusher"), Lt. Brophy ("Pusher"), and Detective Glen Chao ("Hell Money").
- Adversary cards for such formidable foes as the Black Oil ("Piper Maru"/"Apocrypha"), the robotic cockroaches ("War of the Coprophages"), Big Blue ("Quagmire") and the army of cats seen in "Teso Dos Bichos".
- Numerous Bluff cards that made it easier to play Adversaries.
- Several Event RESOURCE cards that doubled the cost of the attacking Adversaries.
- Three promo cards--"Warrant Served" (Event), "Interrogations", (Event), and "Backbreaker" (Combat) were planned as part of this expansion's release.

=== Prototype items ===
Cards and items that were designed, but never saw official release, are discussed below:

- Pewter Agent Fox Mulder and Agent Dana Scully (ca. 1997) – Little information is known about these cards. According to one source, these cards were intended to be sold as a special promotion or collector set, and orders were already being taken when the game was canceled. A prototype card apparently appeared on eBay somewhere between December 2004 and January 2005, and one viewer mentioned "the asking price had too many zeros". Seven pewter cards were created, five of Agent Fox Mulder and two of Agent Dana Scully (the latter is commonly referred to as "the Medusa" due to the unflattering look of Gillian Anderson's character). One of the Agent Fox Mulder pewters can currently be seen on the YouTube channel, Alien Investigations, hosted by Stephen Arvidson. The whereabouts of one of the two Agent Dana Scully pewters is currently unknown. According to graphic design professional Lynette Schmitt, a third pewter for "The Cigarette-Smoking Man" X-File card was in progress.
- Donruss Prototype Cards (ca. 1996) – These extremely rare prototypes, developed by Donruss and NXT Games in 1996, featured early iterations of the cards as full bleed (or borderless) printings. The backsides of these prototype cards indicate the game was originally titled "The X-Files Interactive Card Game."

== Legacy & Influence ==
Following the game's cancellation in 1998, many of the game's mechanics were adopted to form the short-lived Scooby-Doo Expandable Card Game, developed by Brian Woodward and Todd Breitenstein at Journeyman Press and distributed by the United States Playing Card Company in 2000.

Since 2020, renewed interest in The X-Files CCG has been sparked by several dedicated YouTube channels, most notably MMXFILESCCG and Alien Investigations (X-Files CCG); and such dedicated Facebook community groups as The X-Files Collectible Card Game and The X-Files CCG Preservation Society.

- MMXFILESCCG – Premiering in December 2020 and hosted by Michael Perrine and Matthew Caluori, this YouTube channel features numerous interviews with various former USPCC personnel behind the development and marketing of the game as well as guest interviews with numerous X-Files cast members, including Dean Haglund, Chris Owens (actor), Brendan Beiser, Larry Musser, and David Lewis (Canadian actor). Additionally, the channel has featured numerous artifacts of the game, including the rare pewter cards of Agent Fox Mulder and Agent Dana Scully as well as several Gen Con demonstration decks (one of which was divided up and disbursed to dozens of dedicated fans in September 2022). Most recently, the channel has revealed never-before-seen playtest cards for the 101361 Expansion (generously provided by playtester Brian Woodward), which were also disbursed to numerous fans.
- Alien Investigations (X-Files CCG) – Debuting in 2022 and hosted by Stephen Arvidson, this YouTube channel focuses on The X-Files CCG's gameplay and mechanics, meticulously demonstrating how the game is played in order to make it accessible to prospective players. In addition to gameplay episodes, the channel offers beginner tips and strategies, sample deck-builds, and related content.

== Reception ==
Andy Butcher reviewed The X-Files Collectible Card Game for Arcane magazine, rating it a 9 out of 10 overall, and stated that "An interesting idea let down by too much detail and not enough gameplay. The X-Files Collectable Card Game could have been a great game, as well as a great license. As it is, though, it's merely average."

== Reviews ==
- Backstab (Issue 1 - Jan/Feb 1997)
- Backstab #4 (10.13.61)
- Casus Belli #100
- Syfy
- Coleção Dragão Brasil
