= In Harmony (Bright album) =

Studio album by Bright
- Released: October 20, 2010
- Genre: J-pop
- Label: Rhythm Zone

Bright chronology
Real (2010)	In Harmony (2010)	Bright (2012)

In Harmony is the third album by the Japanese J-pop band Bright, released on 20 October 2010. The album was released in two versions: a CD+DVD and a CD only version. The song "Flower" was the theme song for the BeeTV program "キス× Kiss×キス" (KisuxKissxKisu; KissxKissXKiss), and "Shining Star" soundtracked a TV commercial for Shidax. The DVD contains music videos and live versions of several songs on the album.

== Track listing ==
Disc 1 (CD)

1. Xiao Yin
2. あの日の雨
3. Flower
4. Baby Sweet
5. Shining Star
6. Kirai demo Suki: Aishiteru (キライ…でも好き 〜アイシテル〜)
7. Brightest Star: A Cappella Version
8. I’ll Be There: Symphony Orchestra Session
9. Curtain Call: I'll Be There

Disc 2 (DVD)

1. Flower Music Video
2. Flower Making Video
3. Bright 4th Live: Real 2010.3.27 at Namba Hatch Live Video
- Opening: Dance with Us
- Kirai demo Suki: Aishiteru
- Secret
- Promise You

Limited Edition:

1. Bright in Beijing

== Charts ==
Chart	Peak position	Reported sales
Oricon Daily Chart	28	
Oricon Weekly Chart	44	2,100
