= Beyond the Sea (K album) =

Studio album by K
- Released: January 18, 2006
- Genre: J-Pop
- Length: 59:06
- Label: Sony Music Associated Records

K chronology
Beyond the Sea (2006)	Music in My Life (2006)

Beyond the Sea is the first Japanese album of K, featuring the popular "Only Human", theme song to the drama 1 Litre of Tears. It was released in CD+DVD and CD-only formats, with the CD+DVD being a limited release, featuring a short clip titled the prologue of K, describing the artist's debut.

== Track listing ==
=== CD ===
#	Track Name	Length
1.	Cover Girl	3:36
2.	Girlfriend	5:33
3.	Only Human	5:45
4.	TAXI	4:22
5.	陸の上の舟 (Oka no Ue no Fune)	5:03
6.	Beyond the Sea	5:55
7.	Play Another One feat. Mummy-D (Rhymester)	4:21
8.	Fly Away	4:26
9.	Friends before Lovers	4:37
10.	抱きしめたい (Dakishimetai)	4:54
11.	over...	5:27
12.	Bye My Friends	5:07

=== DVD ===
- the prologue of K (6:02)
  - Introduction
  - over... Demo Video
  - Girlfriend Demo Video
  - One Last Cry Demo Video
