= The X-Files =

American television series

- Genre: Science fiction; Supernatural fiction; Horror; Mystery; Thriller
- Created by: Chris Carter
- Showrunner: Chris Carter
- Starring: David Duchovny; Gillian Anderson; Robert Patrick; Annabeth Gish; Mitch Pileggi
- Music by: Mark Snow
- Opening theme: "The X-Files"
- Ending theme: "The X-Files"
- Country of origin: United States
- Original language: English
- No. of seasons: 11
- No. of episodes: 218 (list of episodes)

Production
- Executive producers: Chris Carter; R. W. Goodwin; Howard Gordon; Frank Spotnitz; Vince Gilligan; John Shiban; Kim Manners; Glen Morgan; James Wong; Michelle MacLaren; Michael W. Watkins; David Greenwalt
- Production locations: Vancouver (seasons 1–5, 10–11); Los Angeles (seasons 6–9)
- Cinematography: John Bartley; Bill Roe; Joel Ransom; Jon Joffin; Craig Wrobleski; Ron Stannett; Thomas Del Ruth
- Running time: 42–46 minutes (48 minutes for pilot)
- Production companies: Ten Thirteen Productions; 20th Century Fox Television

Original release
- Network: Fox
- Release: September 10, 1993 – May 19, 2002
- Release: January 24, 2016 – March 21, 2018

Related
- Millennium (1996–1999); The Lone Gunmen (2001)

The X-Files is an American science fiction drama television series created by Chris Carter. The original series aired from September 10, 1993, to May 19, 2002, on Fox, spanning nine seasons, with 202 episodes. A tenth season of six episodes ran from January to February 2016. Following the ratings success of this revival, The X-Files returned for an eleventh season of ten episodes, which ran from January to March 2018. In addition to the television series, two feature films have been released: the 1998 film The X-Files and the stand-alone film The X-Files: I Want to Believe, released in 2008, six years after the original television run ended.

The series revolves around Federal Bureau of Investigation (FBI) Special Agents Fox Mulder (David Duchovny) and Dana Scully (Gillian Anderson), who investigate the eponymous "X-Files": marginalized, unsolved cases involving paranormal phenomena. Mulder is a skilled criminal profiler, an ardent supernaturalist, and a conspiracy theorist who believes in the existence of the paranormal, whereas Scully is a medical doctor and skeptic who has been assigned to scientifically analyze Mulder's case files. Early in the series, both agents apparently become pawns in a much larger conflict and come to trust only each other and select others. The agents discover what appears to be a governmental agenda to hide evidence of extraterrestrial life. Mulder and Scully's shared adventures initially lead them to develop a close platonic bond, which develops into a complex romantic relationship. Roughly one third of the series' episodes follow a complicated mythopoeia-driven story arc about a planned alien invasion, whereas the other two-thirds may be described as "monster of the week" episodes that focus on a single villain, mutant, or monster.

The X-Files was inspired by earlier television series featuring elements of suspense, horror, and speculative science fiction, including The Twilight Zone, Night Gallery, Tales from the Darkside, Twin Peaks, and especially Kolchak: The Night Stalker. When creating the main characters, Carter sought to reverse gender stereotypes by making Mulder a believer and Scully a skeptic. The first seven seasons featured Duchovny and Anderson relatively equally. In the eighth and ninth seasons, Anderson took precedence while Duchovny appeared intermittently. New main characters were introduced: FBI Special Agents John Doggett (Robert Patrick) and Monica Reyes (Annabeth Gish), among others. Mulder and Scully's immediate superior, Assistant Director Walter Skinner (Mitch Pileggi), began to appear regularly. The first five seasons of The X-Files were filmed in Vancouver, British Columbia, before production eventually moved to Los Angeles, apparently to accommodate Duchovny's schedule. However, the series later returned to Vancouver with the filming of The X-Files: I Want to Believe as well as the tenth and eleventh seasons.

The X-Files was a hit for the Fox network and received largely positive reviews, although its long-term story arc was criticized near the conclusion. Initially considered a cult series, it turned into a pop culture touchstone that tapped into public mistrust of governments and large institutions and embraced conspiracy theories and spirituality. Both the series and lead actors Duchovny and Anderson received multiple awards and nominations, and by its conclusion the show was the longest-running science fiction series in American television history. The series also spawned a franchise that includes spin-offs Millennium and The Lone Gunmen, the aforementioned two theatrical films, and accompanying merchandise.

== Premise ==
=== General ===
The X-Files follows Federal Bureau of Investigation (FBI) Special Agents Fox Mulder (David Duchovny) and Dana Scully (Gillian Anderson). Special Agent Mulder is a talented profiler and conspiracy theorist, and an ardent supernaturalist. He is also adamant about the existence of intelligent extraterrestrial life and its presence on Earth. These beliefs earn him the nickname "Spooky Mulder" and an assignment to a little-known department that deals with unsolved cases, the X-Files. His belief in the paranormal springs from the claimed alien abduction of his sister Samantha Mulder when Mulder was 12. Her abduction drives Mulder throughout most of the series. Because of this, as well as more nebulous desires for vindication and the revelation of truths kept hidden by human authorities, Mulder struggles to maintain objectivity in his investigations.

Special Agent Scully is a foil for Mulder in this regard. As a medical doctor and natural skeptic, Scully approaches cases with detachment, even when Mulder, despite his considerable training, loses his objectivity. She is partnered with Mulder initially so that she can debunk Mulder's nonconforming theories, often supplying logical, scientific explanations for the cases' apparently unexplainable phenomena. Although she is frequently able to offer scientific alternatives to Mulder's deductions, she is rarely able to refute them completely. Over the course of the series, she becomes increasingly dissatisfied with her own ability to approach the cases scientifically. After Mulder's abduction at the hands of aliens in the seventh season finale "Requiem", Scully becomes a "reluctant believer" who explains the paranormal with science.

Various episodes also deal with the relationship between Mulder and Scully, originally platonic, but that later develops romantically. Mulder and Scully are joined by John Doggett (Robert Patrick) and Monica Reyes (Annabeth Gish) late in the series, after Mulder is abducted. Doggett replaces him as Scully's partner and helps her search for him, later involving Reyes, of whom Doggett had professional knowledge. The initial run of The X-Files ends when Mulder is secretly subjected to a military tribunal for breaking into the top-secret Mount Weather Emergency Operations Center and viewing plans for alien invasion and colonization of Earth. He is found guilty and sentenced to death but escapes punishment with the help of the other agents, and he and Scully become fugitives.

=== Mythology ===
Key episodes, known as the "mytharc", were recognized as the "mythology" of the series canon; these episodes carried the extraterrestrial/conspiracy storyline that evolved throughout the series. "Monster of the week"—often abbreviated as "MotW" or "MoW"—came to denote the remainder of The X-Files episodes. These episodes, forming the majority of the series, dealt with paranormal (and in certain cases, merely criminal) phenomena, including: serial killers (with or without supernatural powers), cryptids, ghosts, mutants, science fiction technology, horror monsters and religious phenomena. Some of the "monster of the week" episodes featured satiric elements and comedic story lines. The main story arc involves the agents' efforts to uncover a government conspiracy that covers up the existence of extraterrestrials and their sinister collaboration with said government. Mysterious men constituting a shadow element within the U.S. government, known as the Syndicate, are the major villains in the series; late in the series it is revealed that The Syndicate acts as the only liaison between mankind and a group of extraterrestrials that intends to destroy humanity. They are usually represented by the Cigarette Smoking Man (William B. Davis), a ruthless killer, masterful politician, negotiator, failed novelist, and the series' principal antagonist.

As the series goes along, Mulder and Scully learn about evidence of the alien invasion piece by piece. It is revealed that the extraterrestrials plan on using a sentient virus, known as the black oil (also known as "Purity"), to infect mankind and turn the population of the world into a slave race. The Syndicate—having made a deal to be spared by the aliens—have been working to develop an alien-human hybrid that will be able to withstand the effects of the black oil. The group has also been secretly working on a vaccine to overcome the black oil; this vaccine is revealed in the latter parts of season five, as well as the 1998 film. Counter to the alien colonization effort, another faction of aliens, the faceless rebels, are working to stop alien colonization. Eventually, in the season six episodes "Two Fathers" and "One Son", the rebels manage to destroy the Syndicate. The colonists, now without human liaisons, dispatch the "Super Soldiers": beings that resemble humans, but are biologically alien. In the latter parts of season eight, and the whole of season nine, the Super Soldiers manage to replace key individuals in the government, forcing Mulder and Scully to go into hiding.

== Cast and characters ==
=== Starring ===
- Fox Mulder is portrayed by David Duchovny:
  Mulder is an Oxford-educated FBI Special Agent, a conspiracy theorist, a talented criminal profiler, and an ardent supernaturalist who believes in the existence of extraterrestrials and a government conspiracy to hide the truth regarding them. He works in the X-Files division, which is concerned with cases marked as unsolvable; most involve supernatural/mysterious circumstances. Mulder considers the X-Files so important that he has made their study his life's main purpose. After his abduction by aliens at the end of season seven, his role in the show diminishes and much of his work is taken on by Special Agent John Doggett. He appears in an episode of The Lone Gunmen and in both the 1998 film The X-Files and the 2008 film The X-Files: I Want to Believe.
- Dana Scully is portrayed by Gillian Anderson:
  Scully is an FBI Special Agent, a medical doctor, and scientist who is Mulder's partner. In contrast to his credulity, Scully is a skeptic, basing her beliefs on scientific explanations. However, despite her otherwise rigid skepticism, she is a Catholic, and her faith plays an important role in several episodes. As the series progresses, she becomes more open to the possibility of paranormal happenings. In the latter part of the eighth season, her position in the X-Files office is taken by Special Agent Monica Reyes, and Scully moves to Quantico to teach new FBI Special Agents. She appears in both The X-Files feature films.
- John Doggett is portrayed by Robert Patrick (seasons 8–9):
  Doggett is an FBI Special Agent who makes his first appearance in the season eight episode "Within". Doggett served in the United States Marine Corps from the 1970s to the 1980s. Later, he started to work with the New York City Police Department, reaching the rank of Detective. After his son's death, he joined the FBI's Criminal Investigations Division. In 2000, Alvin Kersh assigned him to the X-Files unit as Scully's partner after an unsuccessful task force attempt to find Mulder. He does not appear in The X-Files feature films.
- Monica Reyes is portrayed by Annabeth Gish (season 9; also starring season 8; guest seasons 10–11):
  Reyes is an FBI Special Agent who was born and raised in Mexico City. She majored in folklore and mythology at Brown University and earned a master's degree in religious studies. Her first FBI assignment was serving on a special task force investigating rituals. She is a longtime friend of Doggett's and becomes his partner after Scully's departure. She did not appear in The X-Files feature films.
- Walter Skinner is portrayed by Mitch Pileggi (season 9–11; also starring seasons 3–8; recurring season 2; guest season 1):
  Skinner is an FBI Assistant Director who served in the United States Marine Corps in the Vietnam War. During this time, he shot and killed a young boy carrying explosives, an incident which scarred him for life. Skinner is originally Mulder and Scully's direct supervisor. He later serves the same position for Doggett and Reyes. Although he is originally portrayed as somewhat antagonistic, he eventually becomes a close friend of Mulder and Scully. He appeared in an episode of The Lone Gunmen and in both The X-Files feature films.

=== Also starring ===
- Cigarette Smoking Man is portrayed by William B. Davis (seasons 4–7, 9; recurring seasons 1–3, 10–11):
  The Cigarette Smoking Man is the series' primary villain. In the ninth-season episodes "William" and "The Truth", it is suggested that he is Mulder's biological father. In the seventh-season episode "Requiem", he is believed to have been killed after being pushed down a flight of stairs by Alex Krycek, until the ninth-season finale "The Truth", in which Mulder and Scully travel through remote New Mexico and reach a pueblo where a "wise man" reputedly lives, who is revealed to be Cigarette Smoking Man. He also appears in the 1998 feature film.
- Alex Krycek is portrayed by Nicholas Lea (seasons 5–9; recurring seasons 2–3; guest season 4):
  Krycek is a Russian-American, the son of Cold War immigrants, and first introduced as an FBI Special Agent assigned as a temporary investigation partner to Fox Mulder. Krycek proceeds to work with Mulder and attempts to gain his trust. However, it later becomes evident that Krycek is actually an undercover agent working for Cigarette Smoking Man. Krycek plays an important part in several events that are harmful to Mulder and Scully.
- Jeffrey Spender is portrayed by Chris Owens (season 6; recurring season 5; guest seasons 9, 11):
  Spender is a skeptic who is assigned to The X-Files after Fox Mulder's forced leave. He is the son of Cigarette Smoking Man and his ex-wife, multiple abductee Cassandra Spender, as well as possibly being the half-brother of Mulder. Initially thought to have been murdered by Cigarette Smoking Man, Spender returns, horribly disfigured, in the ninth season and helps Scully's son William.
- Alvin Kersh is portrayed by James Pickens Jr. (season 9; recurring seasons 6, 8; guest season 11):
  As an assistant director (and later deputy director), he temporarily becomes supervisor to Special Agents Fox Mulder and Dana Scully when they are assigned away from the X-Files division. During this time, Cigarette Smoking Man often visits him in his office. Kersh assigns Mulder and Scully mostly to menial tasks, such as terrorist details and Federal background checks. Kersh is largely antagonistic to Mulder and Scully but in "The Truth" somewhat redeems himself by helping Mulder escape a death sentence.

== Production ==
=== Conception ===
Mulder and Scully came right out of my head. A dichotomy. They are the equal parts of my desire to believe in something and my inability to believe in something. My skepticism and my faith. And the writing of the characters came very easily to me. I want, like a lot of people do, to have the experience of witnessing a paranormal phenomenon. At the same time I want not to accept it, but to question it. I think those characters and those voices came out of that duality.

— Chris Carter on creating the characters of Mulder and Scully.

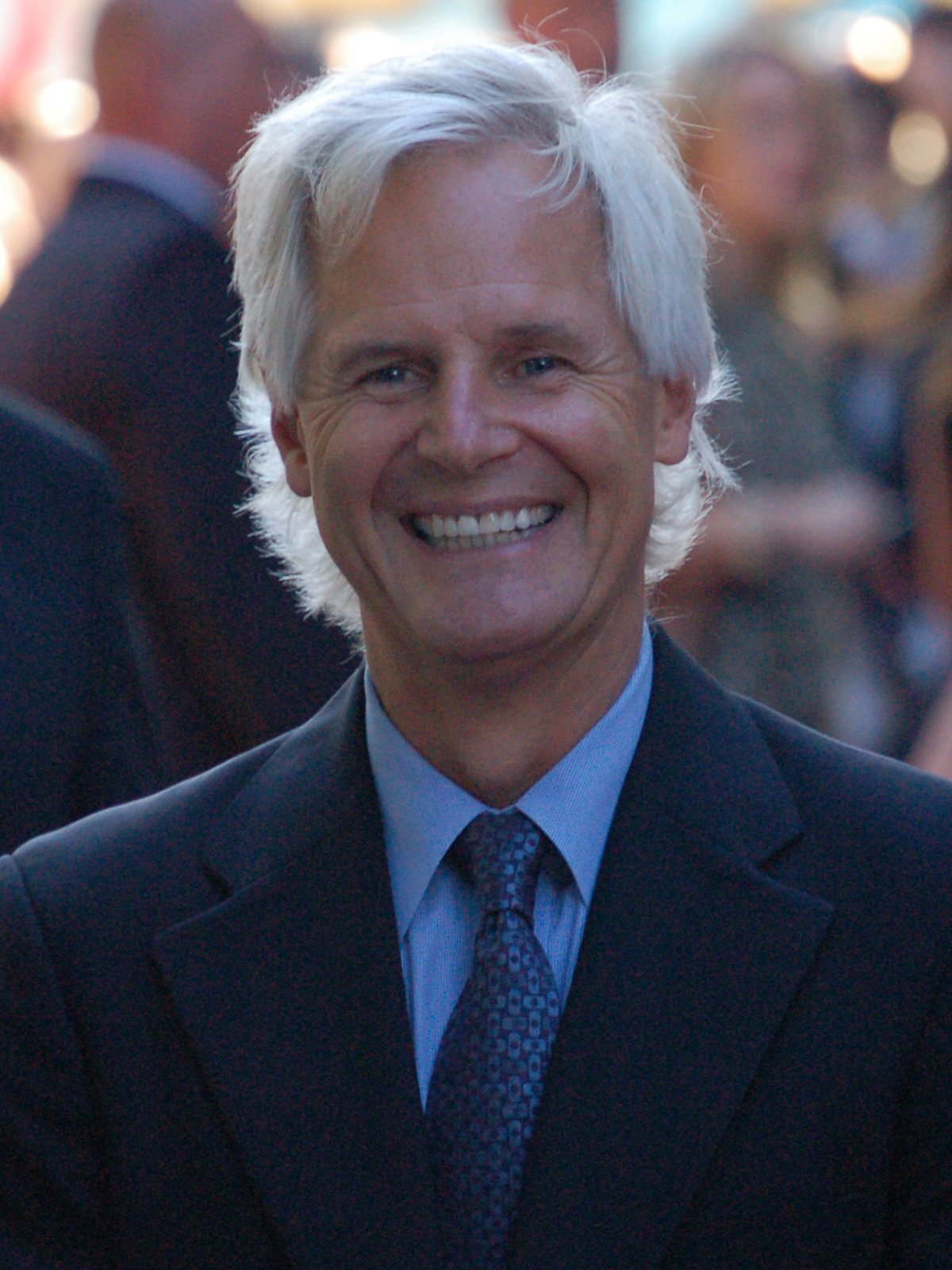
Chris Carter created The X-Files and wrote the series pilot, along with several other episodes.

California native Chris Carter was given the opportunity to produce new shows for the Fox network in the early 1990s. Carter was tired of the comedies he had been working on for Walt Disney Pictures. A report that said 3.7 million Americans believed they may have been abducted by aliens, the Watergate scandal, and the 1970s horror series Kolchak: The Night Stalker all contributed to trigger the idea for The X-Files. He wrote the pilot episode in 1992.

Carter's initial pitch for The X-Files was rejected by Fox executives. He fleshed out the concept and returned a few weeks later, whereupon they commissioned the pilot. Carter worked with NYPD Blue producer Daniel Sackheim to further develop the pilot, drawing stylistic inspiration from the 1988 documentary The Thin Blue Line and the British television series Prime Suspect. Inspiration also came from Carter's memories of The Twilight Zone as well as from The Silence of the Lambs, which provided the impetus for framing the series around agents from the FBI, to provide the characters with a more plausible reason for being involved in each case than Carter believed was present in Kolchak. Carter was determined to keep the relationship between the two leads strictly platonic, basing their interactions on the characters of Emma Peel and John Steed in The Avengers series.

The early 1990s series Twin Peaks was a major influence on the show's dark atmosphere and its often surreal blend of drama and irony. Duchovny had appeared as a transgender DEA agent in Twin Peaks and the Mulder character was seen as a parallel to that show's FBI Agent Dale Cooper. The producers and writers cited All the President's Men, Three Days of the Condor, Close Encounters of the Third Kind, Raiders of the Lost Ark, Rashomon, The Thing, The Boys from Brazil, The Silence of the Lambs and JFK as other influences. Episodes written by Darin Morgan often referred to or referenced other films.

=== Casting ===
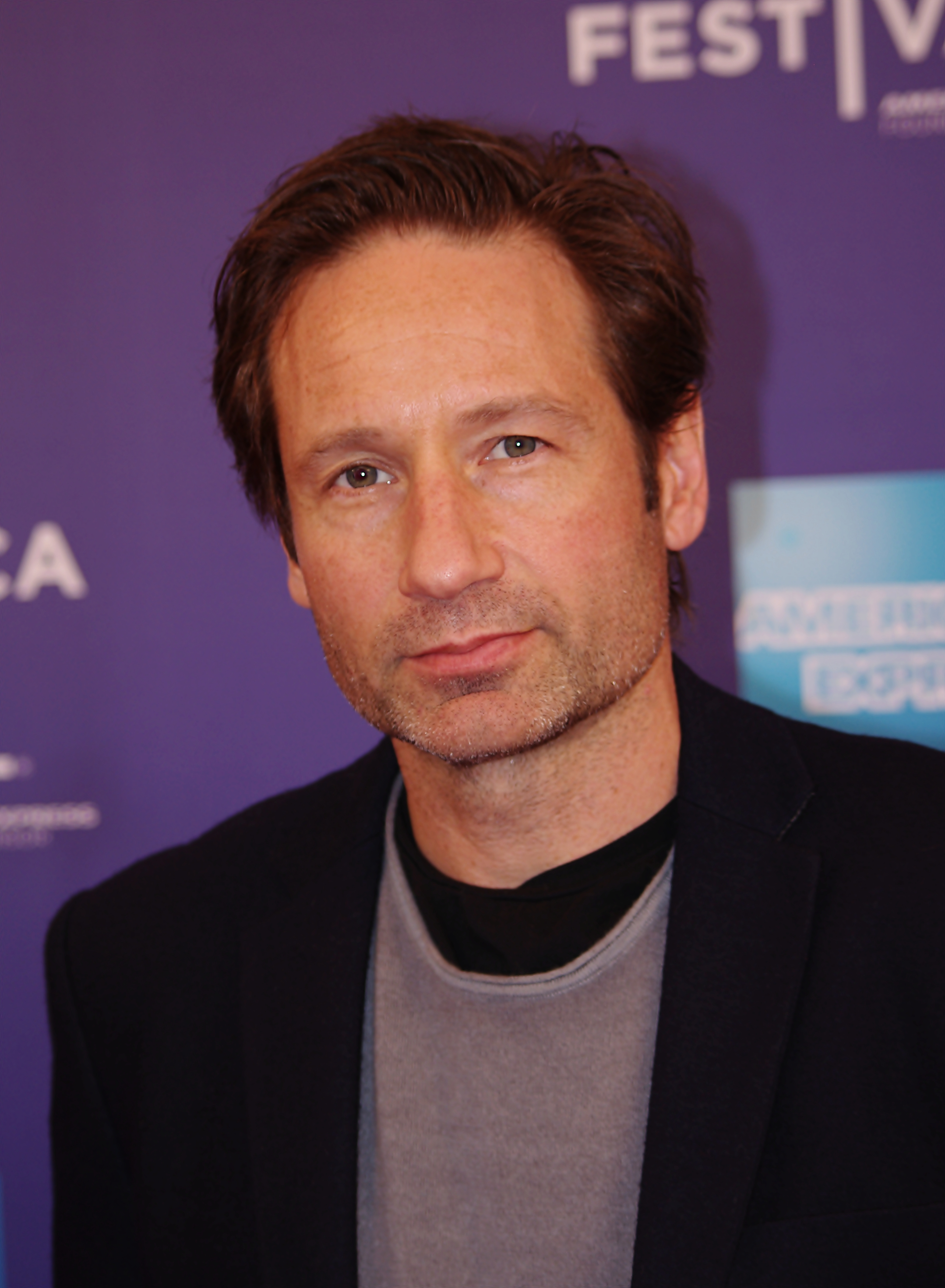
Duchovny portrays Fox Mulder as a main character for season 1–7, 10 and 11 of the series, as well as an intermittent lead in the eighth and ninth.

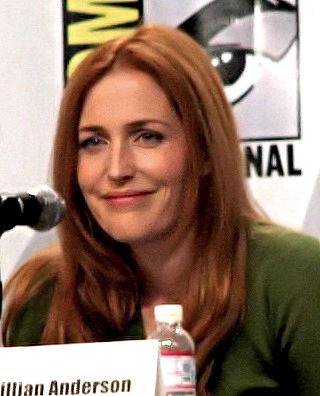
Anderson portrays Dana Scully for the entire eleven seasons of the series. She was the first female writer and director of an episode in 2000.

Duchovny had worked in Los Angeles for three years prior to The X-Files, focusing on feature films. In 1993 his manager Melanie Green gave him the script for the pilot episode of The X-Files. Green and Duchovny were both convinced it was a good script so he auditioned for the lead. Duchovny's audition was "terrific", though he talked rather slowly. While the casting director of the show was very positive toward him, Carter thought that he was not particularly intelligent. He asked Duchovny if he could "please" imagine himself as an FBI agent in "future" episodes. Duchovny, however, turned out to be one of the best-read people that Carter knew.

Anderson auditioned for the part of Scully in 1993. "I couldn't put the script down", she recalled. For the role, the network wanted either a more established actress or one that was "taller, leggier, blonder and breastier" than the 24-year-old Anderson, a theater veteran with minor film experience. After auditions, Carter felt she was the only choice. Carter insisted that Anderson had the kind of "no-nonsense integrity that the role required." For portraying Scully, Anderson won numerous major awards: the Screen Actors Guild Award in 1996 and 1997, an Emmy Award in 1997, and a Golden Globe Award 1997.

The character Walter Skinner was played by actor Mitch Pileggi, who had unsuccessfully auditioned for the roles of two or three other characters on The X-Files before getting the part. At first, being asked back to audition for the recurring role puzzled him, until he discovered the reason he had not previously been cast in those roles—Carter had been unable to envision Pileggi as any of those characters, because the actor had been shaving his head. When Pileggi auditioned for Walter Skinner, he had been in a grumpy mood and had allowed his hair to grow. His attitude fit well with Skinner's character, albeit Carter assuming that the actor only pretended to be grumpy. Pileggi later realized he had been lucky to miss out on earlier roles, as he likely would have appeared in only a single episode rather than play a recurring character.

Before the seventh season aired, Duchovny filed a lawsuit against 20th Century Fox, claiming that Fox had undersold the rights to its own affiliates, thereby costing him huge sums of money. Eventually, the lawsuit was settled and Duchovny was awarded a settlement of about $20 million whereas the lawsuit put strain on Duchovny's professional relationships. Neither Carter nor Duchovny was contracted to work on the series beyond the seventh season. That said, Fox entered into negotiations near the end of that season to bring the two on board for an eighth season. After settling his contract dispute, Duchovny quit full-time participation in the show after the seventh season. This contributed to uncertainties over the likelihood of an eighth season. Carter and most fans felt the show was at its natural endpoint with Duchovny's departure, but it was decided that Mulder would be abducted at the end of the seventh season and would return in 12 episodes the following year. The producers then announced that a new character, John Doggett, would fill Mulder's role.

More than 100 actors auditioned for the role of Doggett, but only about ten were seriously considered. Lou Diamond Phillips, Hart Bochner, and Bruce Campbell were among the ten. The producers chose Robert Patrick. Carter believed that the series could continue for another ten years with new leads, and the opening credits were accordingly redesigned in both seasons eight and nine to emphasize the new actors (along with Pileggi, who was finally listed as a main character). Doggett's presence did not give the series the ratings boost the network executives were hoping for. The eighth-season episode "This is Not Happening" marked the first appearance of Monica Reyes, played by Gish, who became a main character in season nine. Her character was developed and introduced due to Anderson's possible departure at the end of the eighth season. Although Anderson ultimately stayed through the ninth season, Gish became a series regular.

==== Minor recurring characters ====
Glen Morgan and James Wong's early influence on The X-Files mythology led to their introduction of popular secondary characters who continued for years in episodes written by others: Scully's father, William (Don S. Davis); her mother, Margaret (Sheila Larken); and her sister, Melissa (Melinda McGraw). The conspiracy-inspired trio The Lone Gunmen were also secondary characters. The trio was introduced in the first-season episode "E.B.E." as a way to make Mulder appear more credible. They were originally meant to appear in only that episode, but due to their popularity, they returned in the second-season episode "Blood" and became recurring characters. Cigarette Smoking Man, portrayed by William B. Davis, was initially cast as an extra in the pilot episode but, due to his popularity, his character grew into the main antagonist.

=== Filming ===
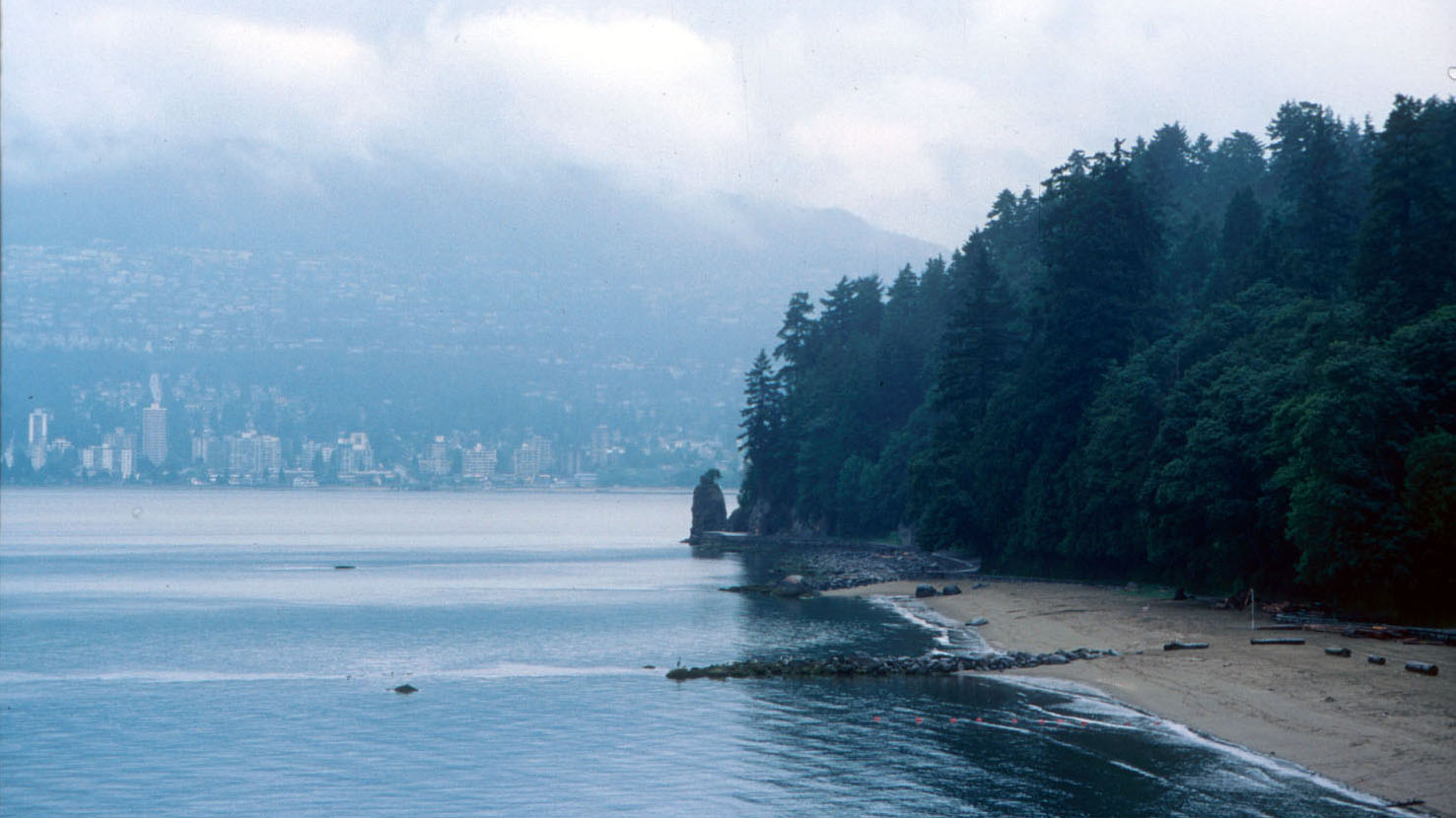
"The End", the season five finale (1998), was the last episode to be filmed in Vancouver until the revival in 2016.

During the early stages of production, Carter founded Ten Thirteen Productions and began to plan for filming the pilot in Los Angeles. However, unable to find suitable locations for many scenes, he decided to "go where the good forests are" and moved production to Vancouver. It was soon realized by the production crew that since so much of the first season would require filming on location, rather than on sound stages, a second location manager would be needed. The show remained in Vancouver for the first five seasons; production then shifted to Los Angeles beginning with the sixth season. Duchovny was unhappy over his geographical separation from his wife, Téa Leoni, although his discontent was popularly attributed to frustration with Vancouver's persistent rain. Anderson also wanted to return to the United States, and Carter relented following the fifth season. The season ended in May 1998 with "The End", the final episode shot in Vancouver and the final episode with the involvement of many of the original crew members, including director and producer R.W. Goodwin and his wife Sheila Larken, who played Margaret Scully and would later return briefly.

With the move to Los Angeles, many changes behind the scenes occurred, as much of the original The X-Files crew was gone. New production designer Corey Kaplan, editor Lynne Willingham, writer David Amann and director and producer Michael Watkins joined and stayed for several years. Bill Roe became the show's new director of photography and episodes generally had a drier, brighter look due to California's sunshine and climate, as compared with Vancouver's rain, fog and temperate forests. Early in the sixth season, the producers took advantage of the new location, setting the show in new parts of the country. For example, Vince Gilligan's "Drive", about a man subject to an unexplained illness, was a frenetic action episode, unusual for The X-Files largely because it was set in Nevada's stark desert roads. The "Dreamland" two-part episode was also set in Nevada, this time in Area 51. The episode was largely filmed at "Club Ed", a movie ranch located on the outskirts of Lancaster, California.

Although the sixth through ninth seasons were filmed in Los Angeles, the series' second movie, The X-Files: I Want to Believe (2008), was filmed in Vancouver, According to Spotnitz, the film's script was written for the city and surrounding areas. The 2016 revival was also shot there.

=== Music ===
The music was composed by Mark Snow, who got involved with The X-Files through his friendship with executive producer Goodwin. Initially Carter had no candidates. A little over a dozen people were considered, but Goodwin continued to press for Snow, who auditioned around three times with no sign from the production staff as to whether they wanted him. One day, however, Snow's agent called him, talking about the "pilot episode" and hinting that he had got the job.

"The X-Files" (sample)
"The X-Files", the theme from the television series, as performed by Mark Snow. The sample illustrates the noted whistle and echo effects.

The theme, "The X-Files", used more instrumental sections than most dramas. The theme song's famous whistle effect was inspired by the track "How Soon Is Now?" from the US edition of The Smiths' 1985 album Meat Is Murder. After attempting to craft the theme with different sound effects, Snow used a Proteus 2 rackmount sound module with a preset sound called "Whistl'n Joe". After hearing this sound, Carter was "taken aback" and noted it was "going to be good". According to the "Behind the Truth" segment on the first season DVD, Snow created the echo effect on the track by accident. He felt that after several revisions, something still was not right. Carter walked out of the room and Snow put his hand and forearm on his keyboard in frustration. By doing so, he accidentally activated an echo effect setting. The resulting riff pleased Carter; Snow said, "this sound was in the keyboard. And that was it." The second episode, "Deep Throat", marked Snow's debut as solo composer for an entire episode. The production crew was determined to limit the music in the early episodes. Likewise, the theme song itself first appeared in "Deep Throat".

Snow was tasked with composing the score for both The X-Files films. The films marked the first appearance of real orchestral instruments; previous music had been crafted by Snow using digitally sampled instrument sounds. Snow's soundtrack for the first film, The X-Files: Original Motion Picture Score, was released in 1998. For the second film, Snow recorded with the Hollywood Studio Symphony in May 2008 at the Newman Scoring Stage at 20th Century Fox in Century City. UNKLE recorded a new version of the theme music for the end credits. Some of the unusual sounds were created by a variation of silly putty and dimes tucked into piano strings. Snow commented that the fast percussion featured in some tracks was inspired by the track "Prospectors Quartet" from the There Will Be Blood soundtrack. The soundtrack score, The X-Files: I Want to Believe, was released in 2008.

=== Opening sequence ===
Shots from the show's original and current opening credit sequence

The opening sequence was made in 1993 for the first season, and remained unchanged until Duchovny left the show. Carter sought to make the title an "impactful opening" with "supernatural images". These scenes notably include a split-screen image of a seed germinating and a "terror-filled, warped face". The latter was created when Carter found a video operator who was able to create the effect. The sequence was extremely popular and won the show its first Emmy Award, which was for Outstanding Graphic Design and Title Sequences. Producer Paul Rabwin was particularly pleased with the sequence, and felt that it was something that had "never [been] seen on television before". In 2017, James Charisma of Paste ranked the show's opening sequence #8 on a list of The 75 Best TV Title Sequences of All Time.

The premiere episode of season eight, "Within", revealed the first major change to the opening credits. Along with Patrick, the sequence used new images and updated photos for Duchovny and Anderson, although Duchovny only appears in the opening credits when he appears in an episode. Carter and the production staff saw Duchovny's departure as a chance to change things. The replacement shows various pictures of Scully's pregnancy. According to executive producer Frank Spotnitz, the sequence also features an "abstract" way of showing Mulder's absence in the eighth season: he falls into an eye. Season nine featured an entirely new sequence. Since Anderson wanted to move on, the sequence featured Reyes and Skinner. Duchovny's return to the show for the ninth-season finale, "The Truth" marked the largest number of cast members to be featured in the opening credits, with five. The revival seasons use the series' original opening credits sequence.

The sequence ends with the tagline "The Truth Is Out There", which is used for the majority of the episodes. For certain episodes, the tagline was changed to be more thematically-relevant; a list of the episodes that received alternate taglines is as follows:

| Episode | Tagline | Source |
|---|---|---|
| "The Erlenmeyer Flask" | "Trust No One" | |
| "Ascension" | "Deny Everything" | |
| "Anasazi" | "'éí 'aaníígÓÓ 'áhoot'é'" ("The truth is far from here" in Navajo) | |
| "731" | "Apology is Policy" | |
| "Herrenvolk" | "Everything Dies" | |
| "Teliko" | "Deceive Inveigle Obfuscate" | |
| "Terma" | "E pur si muove" ("And still it moves" in Italian, a quote attributed to Galileo) | |
| "Gethsemane" | "Believe the Lie" | |
| "Redux" | "All Lies Lead to the Truth" | |
| "The Red and the Black" | "Resist or Serve" | |
| "The End" | "The End" | |
| "Triangle" | "Die Wahrheit ist irgendwo da draußen" ("The truth is out there somewhere" in German) | |
| "The Unnatural" | "In the Big Inning" | |
| "The Sixth Extinction II: Amor Fati" | "Amor Fati" ("Love of fate" in Latin) | |
| "Closure" | "Believe to Understand" | |
| "Nothing Important Happened Today II" | "Nothing Important Happened Today" | |
| "4-D" | "erehT tuO si hturT ehT" ("The Truth is Out There", backwards) | |
| "Trust No 1" | "They're Watching" | |
| "Improbable" | "Dio ti ama" ("God loves you" in Italian) | |
| "My Struggle II" | "This Is the End" | |
| "My Struggle III" | "I Want to Believe/I Want to Lie" | |
| "This" | "Accuse Your Enemies of that Which You are Guilty" | |
| "Ghouli" | "You See What I Want You to See" | |
| "Kitten" | "A War is Never Over" | |
| "Rm9sbG93ZXJz" | "VGhlIFRydXRoIGlzIE91dCBUaGVyZQ=" ("The Truth is Out There" in Base64) | |
| "Nothing Lasts Forever" | "I Want to be Beautiful" | |
| "My Struggle IV" | "Salvator Mundi" ("Savior of the World" in Latin) | |

== Broadcast and release ==
=== Episodes ===
| Season | Episodes | Originally released | |
| Season | Episodes | First released | Last released |
|---|---|---|---|
| 1 | 24 | September 10, 1993 | May 13, 1994 |
| 2 | 25 | September 16, 1994 | May 19, 1995 |
| 3 | 24 | September 22, 1995 | May 17, 1996 |
| 4 | 24 | October 4, 1996 | May 18, 1997 |
| 5 | 20 | November 2, 1997 | May 17, 1998 |
| Fight the Future | | June 19, 1998 | |
| 6 | 22 | November 8, 1998 | May 16, 1999 |
| 7 | 22 | November 7, 1999 | May 21, 2000 |
| 8 | 21 | November 5, 2000 | May 20, 2001 |
| 9 | 20 | November 11, 2001 | May 19, 2002 |
| I Want to Believe | | July 25, 2008 | |
| 10 | 6 | January 24, 2016 | February 22, 2016 |
| 11 | 10 | January 3, 2018 | March 21, 2018 |

=== Nielsen ratings ===
Viewership and ratings per season of The X-Files
| Season | Timeslot (ET) | Episodes | First aired | | Last aired | | TV season | Viewership rank | Avg. viewers (millions) |
| Season | Timeslot (ET) | Episodes | Date | Viewers (millions) | Date | Viewers (millions) | TV season | Viewership rank | Avg. viewers (millions) |
|---|---|---|---|---|---|---|---|---|---|
| 1 | Friday 9:00 p.m. | 24 | September 10, 1993 | 12.0 | May 13, 1994 | 14.0 | 1993–94 | 105 | 11.21 |
| 2 | Friday 9:00 p.m. | 25 | September 16, 1994 | 16.1 | May 19, 1995 | 16.6 | 1994–95 | 63 | 14.50 |
| 3 | Friday 9:00 p.m. | 24 | September 22, 1995 | 19.94 | May 17, 1996 | 17.86 | 1995–96 | 55 | 15.40 |
| 4 | Friday 9:00 p.m. (1–3); Sunday 9:00 p.m. (4–24) | 24 | October 4, 1996 | 21.11 | May 18, 1997 | 19.85 | 1996–97 | 12 | 19.20 |
| 5 | Sunday 9:00 p.m. | 20 | November 2, 1997 | 27.34 | May 17, 1998 | 18.76 | 1997–98 | 11 | 19.80 |
| 6 | Sunday 9:00 p.m. | 22 | November 8, 1998 | 20.24 | May 16, 1999 | 15.86 | 1998–99 | 12 | 17.20 |
| 7 | Sunday 9:00 p.m. | 22 | November 7, 1999 | 17.82 | May 21, 2000 | 15.26 | 1999–2000 | 29 | 14.20 |
| 8 | Sunday 9:00 p.m. | 21 | November 5, 2000 | 15.87 | May 20, 2001 | 14.01 | 2000–01 | 31 | 13.93 |
| 9 | Sunday 9:00 p.m. | 20 | November 11, 2001 | 10.60 | May 19, 2002 | 13.25 | 2001–02 | 63 | 9.10 |
| 10 | Sunday 10:30 p.m. (Premiere); Monday 8:00 p.m. | 6 | January 24, 2016 | 16.19 | February 22, 2016 | 7.60 | 2015–16 | 7 | 13.60 |
| 11 | Wednesday 8:00 p.m. | 10 | January 3, 2018 | 5.15 | March 21, 2018 | 3.43 | 2017–18 | 91 | 5.34 |

The pilot premiered on September 10, 1993, and reached 12 million viewers. As the season progressed, ratings began to increase and the season finale garnered 14 million viewers. The first season ranked 105th out of 128 shows during the 1993–94 television season. The series' second season increased in ratings—a trend that would continue for the next three seasons—and finished 63rd out of 141 shows. These ratings were not spectacular, but the series had attracted enough fans to receive the label "cult hit", particularly by Fox standards. Most importantly, it made great gains among the 18-to-49 age demographic sought by advertisers. During its third year, the series ranked 55th and was viewed by an average of 15.40 million viewers, an increase of almost seven percent over the second season, making it Fox's top-rated program in the 18–49-year-old demographic. Although the first three episodes of the fourth season aired on Friday night, the fourth episode "Unruhe" aired on Sunday night. The show remained on Sunday until its end. The season hit a high with its twelfth episode, "Leonard Betts", which was chosen as the lead-out program following Super Bowl XXXI. The episode was viewed by 29.1 million viewers, the series' highest-rated episode. The fifth season debuted with "Redux I" on November 2, 1997, and was viewed by 27.34 million people, making it the highest-rated non-special broadcast episode of the series. The season ranked as the eleventh-most watched series during the 1997–98 year, with an average of 19.8 million viewers. It was the series' highest-rated season as well as Fox' highest-rated program during the 1997–98 season.

The sixth season premiered with "The Beginning", watched by 20.24 million viewers. The show ended season six with lower numbers than the previous season, beginning a decline that would continue for the show's final three years. The X-Files was nevertheless Fox's highest-rated show that year. The seventh season, originally intended as the show's last, ranked as the 29th most-watched show for the 1999–2000 year, with 14.20 million viewers. This made it, at the time, the lowest-rated year of the show since the third season. The first episode of season eight, "Within", was viewed by 15.87 million viewers. The episode marked an 11% decrease from the seventh season opener, "The Sixth Extinction". The first part of the ninth season opener, "Nothing Important Happened Today", only attracted 10.6 million viewers, the series' lowest-rated season premiere.

The original series finale, "The Truth", attracted 13.25 million viewers, the series' lowest rated season finale. The ninth season was the 63rd most-watched show for the 2001–02 season, tying its season two rank. On May 19, 2002, the finale aired and the Fox network confirmed that The X-Files was over. When talking about the beginning of the ninth season, Carter said, "We lost our audience on the first episode. It's like the audience had gone away and I didn't know how to find them. I didn't want to work to get them back because I believed what we are doing deserved to have them back." While news outlets cited declining ratings because of lackluster stories and poor writing, The X-Files production crew blamed September 11 terrorist attacks as the main factor. At the end of 2002, The X-Files had become the longest-running consecutive science fiction series ever on American broadcast television. This record was later surpassed by Stargate SG-1 in 2007 and Smallville in 2011.

The debut episode of the 2016 revival, "My Struggle", first aired on January 24, 2016, and was watched by 16.19 million viewers. In terms of viewers, this made it the highest-rated episode of The X-Files to air since the eighth-season episode "This Is Not Happening" in 2001, which was watched by 16.9 million viewers. When DVR and streaming are taken into account, "My Struggle" was seen by 21.4 million viewers, scoring a 7.1 Nielsen rating. The season ended with "My Struggle II", which was viewed by 7.60 million viewers. In total, the season was viewed by an average of 13.6 million viewers; it ranked as the seventh most-watched television series of the 2015–16 year, making it the highest-ranked season of The X-Files to ever air. A few years later, the premiere episode of the eleventh season, "My Struggle III", was watched by 5.15 million viewers. This was a decrease from the previous season's debut; it was also the lowest-rated premiere for any season of the show. The season concluded with "My Struggle IV", which was seen by 3.43 million viewers, which was also a decrease from the previous season. "My Struggle IV", which became the de facto finale for the series, was also the show's lowest-rated finale. In total, the season was viewed by an average of 5.34 million viewers, and it ranked as the 91st most-watched television series of the 2018–19 year.

==== SVOD viewership ====
According to the streaming aggregator JustWatch, The X-Files was the ninth most streamed television series across all platforms in the United States, during the week ending November 7, 2021.

=== Films ===
After several successful seasons, Carter wanted to tell the story of the series on a wider scale, which ultimately turned into a feature film. He later explained that the main problem was to create a story that would not require the viewer to be familiar with the broadcast series. The movie was filmed in the hiatus between the show's fourth and fifth seasons and re-shoots were conducted during the filming of the show's fifth season. Due to the demands on the actors' schedules, some episodes of the fifth season focused on just one of the two leads. On June 19, 1998, the eponymous The X-Files, also known as The X-Files: Fight the Future was released. The crew intended the movie to be a continuation of the season five finale "The End", but it was also meant to stand on its own. The season six premiere, "The Beginning", began where the film ended.

The film was written by Carter and Spotnitz and directed by series regular Rob Bowman. In addition to Mulder, Scully, Skinner and Cigarette Smoking Man, it featured guest appearances by Martin Landau, Armin Mueller-Stahl and Blythe Danner, who appeared only in the film. It also featured the last appearance of John Neville as the Well-Manicured Man. Jeffrey Spender, Diana Fowley, Alex Krycek and Gibson Praise—characters who had been introduced in the fifth-season finale and/or were integral to the television series—do not appear in the film. Although the film had a strong domestic opening and received mostly positive reviews from critics, attendance dropped sharply after the first weekend. Although it failed to make a profit during its theatrical release—due in part to its large promotional budget—The X-Files film was more successful internationally. Eventually, the worldwide theatrical box office total reached $189 million. The film's production cost and ad budgets were each close to $66 million. Unlike in the series, Anderson and Duchovny received equal pay for the film.

In November 2001, Carter decided to pursue a second film adaptation. Production was slated to begin after the ninth season, with a projected release in December 2003. In April 2002, Carter reiterated his desire and the studio's desire to do a sequel film. He planned to write the script over the summer and begin production in spring or summer 2003 for a 2004 release. Carter described the film as independent of the series, saying, "We're looking at the movies as stand-alones. They're not necessarily going to have to deal with the mythology." Bowman, who had directed various episodes of The X-Files in the past as well as the 1998 film, expressed an interest in the sequel, but Carter took the job. Spotnitz co-authored the script with Carter. The X-Files: I Want to Believe became the second film based on the series, after 1998's The X-Files: Fight the Future. Filming began in December 2007 in Vancouver and finished on March 11, 2008.

The film was released in the United States on July 25, 2008, grossing $4 million on its opening day. It opened fourth on the U.S. weekend box office chart, with a gross of $10.2 million. By the end of its theatrical run, it had grossed $20,982,478 domestically and an additional $47,373,805 internationally, for a total worldwide gross of $68,369,434. Among 2008 domestic releases, it finished in 114th place. The film's stars both claimed that the timing of the movie's release, a week after the highly popular Batman film The Dark Knight, negatively affected its success. The film received mixed to negative reviews. Metacritic, which assigns a rating out of 100 reviews from mainstream film critics, reported "mixed or average" reviews, with an average score of 47 based on 33 reviews. Rotten Tomatoes reported that 32% of 160 listed film critics gave the film a positive review, with an average rating of 4.9 out of 10. The website wrote of the critics' consensus, stating, "The chemistry between leads David Duchovny and Gillian Anderson do live [sic] up to The X-Files' televised legacy, but the roving plot and droning routines make it hard to identify just what we're meant to believe in."

=== Revival ===
In several interviews around the release, Carter said that if the X-Files: I Want to Believe film proved successful at the box office, a third installment would be made going back to the TV series' mythology, focusing specifically on the alien invasion and colonization of Earth foretold in the ninth-season finale, due to occur on December 22, 2012. In an October 2009 interview, David Duchovny likewise said he wanted to do a 2012 X-Files movie, but did not know if he would get the chance. Anderson stated in August 2012 that a third X-Files film is "looking pretty good". As of July 2013, Fox had not approved the movie, although Carter, Spotnitz, Duchovny and Anderson expressed interest. At the New York Comic Con held October 10–13, 2013, Duchovny and Anderson reaffirmed that they and Carter were interested in making a third film, with Anderson saying, "If it takes fan encouragement to get Fox interested in that, then I guess that's what it would be."

On January 17, 2015, Fox confirmed that they were looking at the possibility of bringing The X-Files back, not as a movie, but as a limited run television season. Fox chairman Dana Walden told reporters that "conversations so far have only been logistical and are in very early stages", and that the series would only go forward if Carter, Anderson, and Duchovny were all on board, and that it was a matter of ensuring all of their timetables are open. On March 24, 2015, it was confirmed the series would return with series creator Chris Carter and lead actors David Duchovny and Gillian Anderson. It premiered on January 24, 2016. A year later, on April 20, 2017, Fox officially announced that The X-Files would be returning for an eleventh season of ten episodes, which premiered on January 3, 2018.

In January 2018, Gillian Anderson confirmed that season 11 would be her final season of The X-Files. The following month, Carter stated in an interview that he could see the show continuing without Anderson. In May 2018, Fox's co-CEO Gary Newman commented that "there are no plans to do another season at the moment." In October 2020, Chris Carter said: "I always thought there would be even more X-Files." He admitted that continuing the series at this point with Duchovny and Anderson is unlikely but had plans to continue the franchise with an upcoming animated spinoff. "Being that Gillian has decided to move on with her career, we certainly couldn't do Mulder and Scully again. But that's not to say there isn't another way to do The X-Files. And so right now I think the future is unwritten." The rights to the concept have been by owned Disney since its acquisition of Fox in 2017.

=== Home media ===
On September 24, 1996, the first "wave" set of The X-Files VHS tapes were released. Wave sets were released covering the first through fourth seasons. Each "wave" was three VHS tapes, each containing two episodes, for a total of six episodes per wave and two waves per season. For example, the home video release of wave one drew from the first half of the first season: "Pilot"/"Deep Throat", "Conduit"/"Ice" and "Fallen Angel"/"Eve". Each wave was also available in a boxed set. Unlike later DVD season releases, the tapes did not include every episode from the seasons. Ultimately twelve episodes—approximately half the total number aired—were selected by Carter to represent each season, including nearly all "mythology arc" episodes and selected standalone episodes. Carter briefly introduced each episode with an explanation of why the episode was chosen and anecdotes from the set. These clips were later included on the full season DVDs. Wave eight, covering the last part of the fourth season, was the last to be released. No Carter interviews appeared on DVDs for later seasons. Many of the waves had collectible cards for each episode.

All nine seasons were released on DVD along with the two films. Seasons 1 to 4 were in fullscreen and seasons 5 and onward were in widescreen with the top and bottom of the opening credits cropped off. It is not widely known how accurate this is to the original broadcasts. The entire series was re-released on DVD in early 2006, in a "slimmer" package. The first five slim case versions did not come with some bonus materials that were featured in the original fold-out versions. However, seasons six, seven, eight and nine all contained the bonus materials found in the original versions. Episodic DVDs have also been released in Region 2, such as "Deadalive", "Existence", "Nothing Important Happened Today", "Providence" and "The Truth". Various other episodes were released on DVD and VHS. In 2005, four DVD sets were released containing the main story arc episodes of The X-Files. The four being Volume 1 – Abduction, Volume 2 – Black Oil, Volume 3 – Colonization and Volume 4 – Super Soldiers. A boxed set containing all nine seasons and the first film was made available in 2007, which contains all of the special features from the initial releases. The set also includes an additional disc of new bonus features and various collectibles, including a poster for the first film, a comic book, a set of collector cards and a guide to all 202 episodes across all nine seasons and the first film. Due to the fact that the set was released in 2007, the second film, which was released in 2008, is not included.

Release of The X-Files' seasons on Blu-ray, restored in high-definition, was rumored to begin in late 2013. The German TV channel ProSieben Maxx began airing first-season episodes reformatted in widescreen and in high-definition on January 20, 2014. On April 23, 2015, Netflix began streaming episodes of The X-Files in high definition, marking the first time that the series has been made available in the high resolution format in North America. In October 2015, it was confirmed that the complete series would be reissued on Blu-ray, and the full set was released on December 8, 2015. The set was criticized for using the wrong fonts for the title sequence and season 8 was affected by color balance issues making the picture appear darker in most episodes (an issue known as "black crush"). These issues led to Fox offering corrected discs and eventually issuing new sets with the correct color balance.

== Other media ==
=== Television series ===
==== Spin-offs ====
===== Millennium =====
Millennium is an American television series created by Carter, which aired on Fox from October 25, 1996 to May 21, 1999. Though originally unconnected, following its cancellation, the series eventually crossed over with The X-Files in its seventh season, and as such is part of The X-Files franchise. Additionally, the characters of Fox Mulder and Dana Scully make a brief cameo in a first season episode of Millennium, titled "Lamentation", though portrayed by different actors. The theme music was composed by Mark Snow, who also created the distinctive theme music for The X-Files. The series follows the investigations of ex-FBI agent Frank Black (Lance Henriksen), now a consultant, with the ability to see inside the minds of criminals, working for a mysterious organization known as the Millennium Group. After the series' cancellation in 1999, the seventh season episode of The X-Files, titled "Millennium", featured the Millennium Group and Frank Black, as a way of giving the show some closure.

===== The Lone Gunmen =====
The Lone Gunmen is an American science fiction television series created by Carter and broadcast on Fox and was crafted as a more humorous spin-off of The X-Files. The series starred the eponymous Lone Gunmen, regular recurring and guest characters throughout The X-Files who often helped Fox Mulder, and was first broadcast in March 2001, during The X-Files's month-long hiatus. Although the debut episode garnered 13.23 million viewers, its ratings began to steadily drop. The program was cancelled after thirteen episodes. The last episode was broadcast in June 2001 and ended on a cliffhanger which was partially resolved in a ninth season episode of The X-Files titled "Jump the Shark", included in the DVD release of the series.

==== Canceled animated series ====
In August 2020, Fox announced that an animated comedy-oriented reboot series was in development, under the working title The X-Files: Albuquerque. In March 2023, it was confirmed the series would not be moving forward.

==== Ryan Coogler reboot ====
In March 2023, it was reported that Ryan Coogler was developing a new reboot of the series, per series creator Chris Carter. In February 2024, Carter confirmed he is not involved with its production. In April 2025, Coogler said the X-Files reboot would be his next project after the film Sinners, and he began working on the project by October of that year; Coogler said that he chose to work on the project due to his mother's love for the original series. In December 2025, Coogler noted the new series would follow the original, stating "We intend on having both monsters of the week and also the overarching conspiracy". Gillian Anderson stated as early as April 2024 about her possible return in the future as long as Coogler's involved. In August 2026, Carter believes both Mulder and Scully will appear in the reboot and was quoted as saying, "At least Gillian, I think, is going to appear in the Coogler version. And I'm assuming David will too, so you will see Mulder and Scully there."

In February 2026, Hulu ordered a pilot for the reboot, which was written and directed by Coogler. The series stars Danielle Deadwyler and Himesh Patel as FBI agents, who "form an unlikely bond when they are assigned to a long-shuttered division devoted to cases involving unexplained phenomena." Jennifer Yale served as showrunner and Chris Carter served as an executive producer. Amy Madigan, Steve Buscemi, Ben Foster, Devery Jacobs, Lochlyn Munro, Tantoo Cardinal, Joel Montgrand and Sofia Grace Clifton guest starred in the pilot. Filming began in Vancouver in May 2026.

On October 13, 2026, a series order was greenlit by Hulu.

=== Comic books ===
The X-Files was converted into a comic book series published by Topps Comics during the show's third and fourth seasons. The initial comic books were written solely by Stefan Petrucha. According to Petrucha, there were three types of stories: "those that dealt with the characters, those that dealt with the conspiracy, and the monster-of-the-week sort of stuff". Petrucha cited the latter as the easiest to write. Petrucha saw Scully as a "scientist [...] with real world faith", and that the difference between [Mulder and Scully] is not that Mulder believes and Scully doesn't; it's more a difference in procedure." In this manner, Mulder's viewpoint was often written to be just as valid as Scully's, and Scully's science was often portrayed to be just as convincing as Mulder's more outlandish ideas. Petrucha was eventually fired and various other authors took up the job. Topps published 41 regular issues of The X-Files from 1995–98.

A crossover graphic novel between The X-Files and 30 Days of Night was published by WildStorm in 2010. It follows Mulder and Scully to Alaska as they investigate a series of murders that may be linked to vampires.

In 2013, it was announced that The X-Files would return to comic book form with Season 10, now published by IDW. The series, which follows Mulder and Scully after the events of The X-Files: I Want to Believe, was released in June 2013. Joe Harris wrote the series, and Michael Walsh and Jordie Bellaire provided the artwork. It was later announced that Carter himself would be the executive producer for the series and would be "providing feedback to the creative team regarding scripts and outlines to keep the new stories in line with existing and on-going canon." The series restarted the series' mythology, and the first arc of the story focused on "seek[ing] to bring the mythology of the Alien Conspiracy back up to date in a more paranoid, post-terror, post-WikiLeaks society." In addition, sequels to popular "monster of the week" episodes were made. The X-Files Season 10 concluded on July 1, 2015, after 25 issues.

In August 2015, the X-Files Season 11 comic book began, also published by IDW. The eight-issue series served as a continuation of the TV show. Chris Carter was the Executive Producer of the comic book series, while the issues were written by Joe Harris and illustrated by Matthew Dow Smith and Jordie Bellaire.

== Reception ==
=== Critical reception ===
The X-Files received positive reviews from television critics, with many calling it one of the best series that aired on American television in the 1990s. Ian Burrell from the British newspaper The Independent called the show "one of the greatest cult shows in modern television". Richard Corliss from Time magazine called the show the "cultural touchstone of" the 1990s. Hal Boedeker from the Orlando Sentinel said in 1996 that the series had grown from a cult favorite to a television "classic". The Evening Herald said the show had "overwhelming influence" on television, in front of such shows as The Simpsons. In 2012, Entertainment Weekly listed the show at No. 4 in the "25 Best Cult TV Shows from the Past 25 Years", describing it as "a paean to oddballs, sci-fi fans, conspiracy theorists and Area 51 pilgrims everywhere. Ratings improved every year for the first five seasons, while Mulder and Scully's believer-versus-skeptic dynamic created a TV template that's still in heavy use today."

In 2004 and 2007, The X-Files ranked #2 on TV Guide's "Top Cult Shows Ever". In 2002, the show ranked as the 37th best television show of all time. In 1997, the episodes "Clyde Bruckman's Final Repose" and "Small Potatoes" respectively ranked #10 and #72 on "TV Guide's 100 Greatest Episodes of All Time". In 2013, TV Guide included it in its list of the "60 Greatest Dramas of All Time" and ranked it as the #4 science fiction show and the #25 best series of all time. In 2007, Time included it on a list of the "100 Best TV Shows of All Time". In 2008, Entertainment Weekly named it the fourth-best piece of science fiction media, the fourth best TV show in the last 25 years and in 2009, named it the fourth-best in their list of the "20 Greatest Sci-fi TV Shows" in history. Empire magazine ranked The X-Files ninth best TV show in history, further claiming that the best episode was the third season entry "Jose Chung's From Outer Space". In 2013, the Writers Guild of America ranked The X-Files #26 on their list of the 101 Best Written TV Series. In 2015, on The Hollywood Reporter's entertainment-industry ranked TV list "Hollywood's 100 Favorite TV Shows", The X-Files appeared at #3. According to The Guardian, MediaDNA research discovered that The X-Files was on top of the list of the most innovative TV brands. In 2009, it was announced that the show's catchphrase "The Truth Is Out There" was among Britain's top 60 best-known slogans and quotes.

The X-Files has been criticized for being unscientific and privileging paranormal and supernatural ideas (e.g. the hypotheses made by Mulder). For instance, in 1998, Richard Dawkins wrote that "The X-Files systematically purveys an anti-rational view of the world which, by virtue of its recurrent persistence, is insidious."

=== Accolades ===
The X-Files received prestigious awards over its nine-year run, totaling 62 Emmy nominations and 16 awards. Capping its successful first season, The X-Files crew members James Castle, Bruce Bryant and Carol Johnsen won the Emmy Award for Outstanding Individual Achievement in Graphic Design and Title Sequences in 1994. In 1995, the show was nominated for seven Emmy Awards with one win. The following year, the show won five Emmys out of eight nominations, including Darin Morgan for Outstanding Writing for a Drama Series. In 1997, The X-Files won three awards out of twelve, including Gillian Anderson for Outstanding Lead Actress in a Drama Series. In 1998, the show won one of fifteen. In 1999, it won one out of eight in the category for Outstanding Makeup for a Series. Season seven won three Emmys from six nominations. The following season would not be as successful, catching only two nominations and winning again in the Makeup category for "Deadalive". The ninth season received one nomination in Outstanding Music Composition for a Series (Dramatic Underscore).

The show was nominated for 12 Golden Globe Awards overall, winning five. The first nomination came in 1994, when the show won Best Series – Drama. The following year, Anderson and Duchovny were nominated for Best Actor in a Leading Role and Best Actress in a Leading Role, respectively. In 1997, the series won three awards; Anderson and Duchovny for Best Actress and Actor and for Best Series – Drama. In 1998 and 1999, the show received the same three nominations. In 1998 the series won Best Series – Drama". In 1999, the series won no award and received no nominations thereafter.

The show was nominated for 14 SAG Awards overall, winning twice. In 1996 and 1997, Anderson won for Outstanding Performance by a Female Actor in a Drama Series. In 1996, the show won a Peabody Award for being able "to convey ideas that are both entertaining and thought-provoking". The show has also been nominated for two American Cinema Editors awards, three Directors Guild of America Awards, nine Television Critics Association Awards and two Writers Guild of American Awards. The X-Files was nominated for nine Satellite Awards, winning two, and two Young Artist Awards, winning one.

== Influence ==
=== Fandom ===
As The X-Files saw its viewership expand from a "small, but devoted" group of fans to a worldwide mass cult audience, digital telecommunications were becoming mainstream. According to The New York Times, "this may have been the first show to find its audience growth tied to the growth of the Internet". Fans of the show became commonly known as "X-Philes", a term coined from the Greek root "-phil-" meaning love or obsession. X-Philes reviewed episodes on unofficial websites, formed communities with other fans through Usenet newsgroups and listservs, and wrote their own fan fiction.

The X-Files also "caught on with viewers who wouldn't ordinarily consider themselves sci-fi fans". While Carter argued that the show was plot-driven, many fans saw it as character-driven. Duchovny and Anderson were characterized as "Internet sex symbols". As the show grew in popularity, subgroups of fans developed, such as "shippers", hoping for a romantic or sexual partnership between Mulder and Scully, or those who already perceived one between the lines. The usage of the term "ship" in its relationship sense appears to have been originated by Internet fans of The X-Files.

Other groups arose to pay tribute to the stars or their characters, while others joined the subculture of "slash" fiction. In the summer of 1996, a journalist wrote, "There are entire forums online devoted to the 'M/S' [Mulder and Scully] relationship." In addition to "MOTW", Internet fans invented acronyms such as "UST", meaning "unresolved sexual tension", and "COTR", standing for "conversation on the rock"—referencing a popular scene in the third-season episode "Quagmire"—to aid in their discussions of the agents' relationship, which was itself identified as the "MSR".

The producers did not endorse some fans' readings, according to a study on the subject:

Not content to allow Shippers to perceive what they wish, Carter has consistently reassured NoRomos [those against the idea of a Mulder/Scully romance] that theirs is the preferred reading. This allows him the plausible deniability to credit the show's success to his original plan even though many watched in anticipation of a romance, thanks, in part, to his strategic polysemy. He can deny that these fans had reason to do so, however, since he has repeatedly stated that a romance was not and would never be.

The Scully-obsessed writer in Carter's 1999 episode "Milagro" was read by some as his alter ego, realizing that by this point "she has fallen for Mulder despite his authorial intent". The writers sometimes paid tribute to the more visible fans by naming minor characters after them. For example, Leyla Harrison, played by Jolie Jenkins and introduced in the eighth-season episode "Alone", was created and named in memory of an Internet fan and prolific writer of fan fiction of the same name, who died of cancer on February 10, 2001.

=== Merchandise ===
The X-Files spawned an industry of spin-off products. In 2004, American-based Topps Comics, and most recently DC Comics imprint Wildstorm, launched a new series of licensed tie-in comics. During the series run, the Fox Broadcasting Company published the official The X-Files Magazine. The X-Files Collectible Card Game was released in 1996, and an expansion set was released in 1997.

The X-Files has inspired four video games. In 1997, Fox Interactive released The X-Files: Unrestricted Access, a game-style database for Windows and Mac, which allowed users access to every case file. In 1998, The X-Files Game was released for the PC and Macintosh and a year later for the PlayStation. This game is set within the timeline of the second or third season and follows an Agent Craig Willmore in his search for the missing Mulder and Scully. In 2004, The X-Files: Resist or Serve was released. The survival-horror game for the PlayStation 2 is an original story set in the seventh season. It allows the player control of both Mulder and Scully. Both games feature acting and voice work from members of the series' cast. A mobile mystery investigation game The X-Files: Deep State was released in February 2018. The story of the game takes place between seasons 9 and 10 of the show and follows two FBI agents, Casey Winter and Garret Dale, as they investigate a conspiracy. A six-player pinball game, The X-Files, was produced by Sega in 1997.

=== Legacy ===
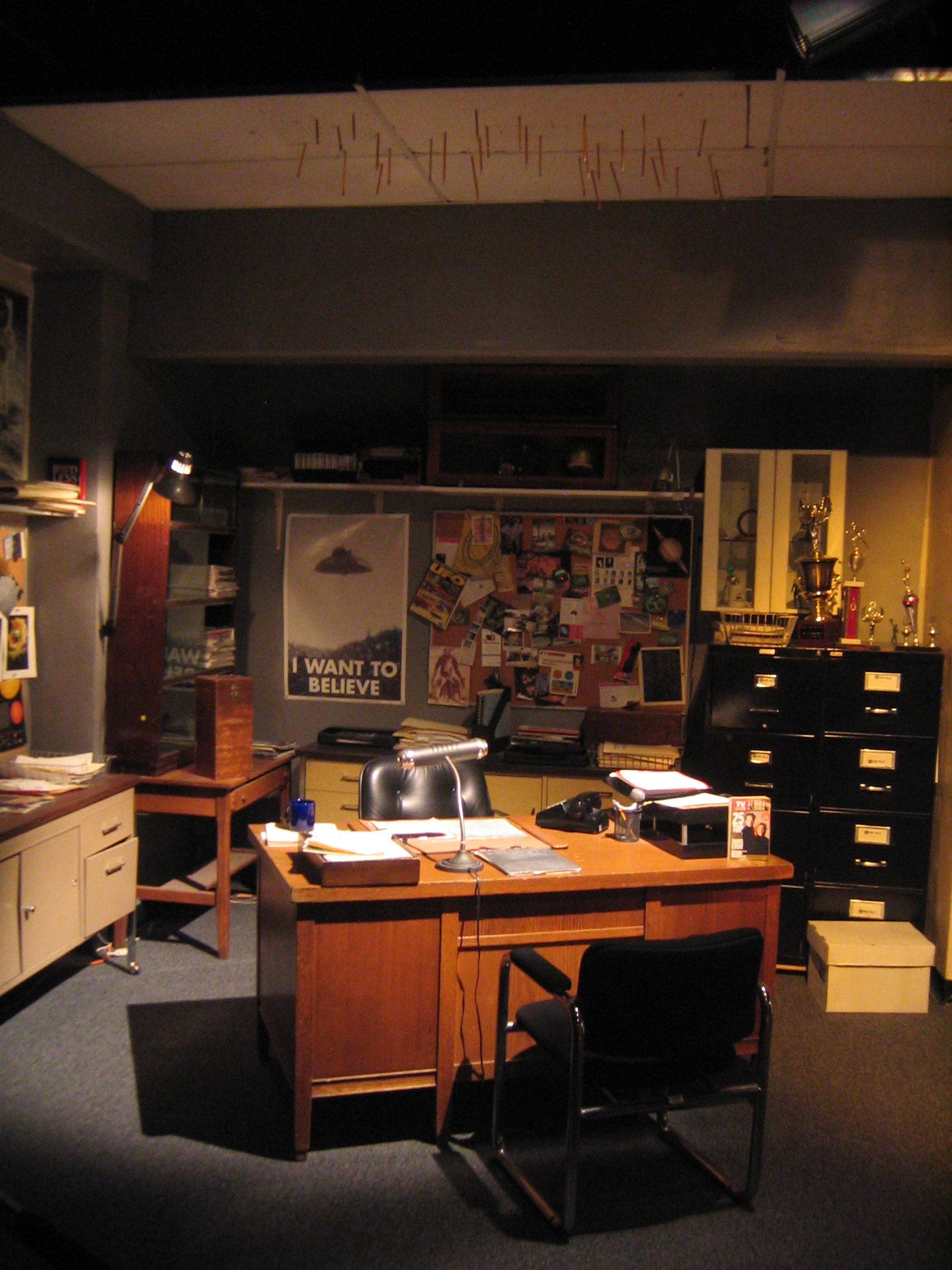
The set for Mulder's office

The X-Files directly inspired other TV series, including Strange World, The Burning Zone, Special Unit 2, Mysterious Ways, Lost, Dark Skies, The Visitor, Fringe, Warehouse 13, Supernatural, and Gravity Falls, with key aspects carried over to more standard crime dramas, such as Eleventh Hour and Bones. The influence can be seen on other levels: television series such as Lost developed their own complex mythologies. In terms of characterization, the role of Dana Scully was seen as innovative, changing "how women [on television] were not just perceived but behaved" and perhaps influencing the portrayal of other "strong women" investigators. Russell T Davies said The X-Files had been an inspiration on his series Torchwood, describing it as "dark, wild and sexy... The X-Files meets This Life". Other shows have been influenced by the tone and mood of The X-Files. For example, Buffy the Vampire Slayer drew from the mood and coloring of The X-Files, as well as from its occasional blend of horror and humor; creator Joss Whedon described his show as "a cross between The X-Files and My So-Called Life".

The X-Files's great popularity led to it becoming a touchstone of popular culture. The show was parodied in The Simpsons season eight episode "The Springfield Files", which aired on January 12, 1997. In it, Mulder and Scully—voiced by Duchovny and Anderson—are sent to Springfield to investigate an alien sighting by Homer Simpson, but end up finding no evidence other than Homer's word and depart. Cigarette Smoking Man appears in the background when Homer is interviewed, and the show's theme plays during one scene. Nathan Ditum from Total Film ranked Duchovny and Anderson's performances as the fourth-best guest appearances in The Simpsons history. In the Star Trek: Deep Space Nine episode "Trials and Tribble-ations", Benjamin Sisko is interviewed by Federation Department of Temporal Investigations agents Dulmer and Lucsly, anagrams of Mulder and Scully, respectively. The pair were later expanded upon in Christopher L. Bennett's book Watching the Clock. The X-Files has also been parodied or referenced in shows such as 3rd Rock from the Sun, Archer, NewsRadio, American Horror Story, The Big Bang Theory, Bones, Breaking Bad, Californication (which stars David Duchovny), Supernatural, Castle, Family Guy, Hey Arnold!, King of the Hill, South Park, and Two and a Half Men. It also inspired themes in video games Deus Ex and Perfect Dark.

In the musical realm, the British band Catatonia released the single "Mulder and Scully", which became a top ten hit on the UK Singles Chart in 1998. American singer and songwriter Bree Sharp wrote a song in 1999 called "David Duchovny" about the actor that heavily references the show. Although never a mainstream hit, the song became popular underground and gained a cult following. Finnish band Sonata Arctica released, in 1999, "Letter to Dana", in which the title character, Dana O'Hara, is named after Scully. The series has also been referenced in songs such as "The Bad Touch" by the Bloodhound Gang, "A Change" by Sheryl Crow, "Year 2000" by Xzibit, and "One Week" by Barenaked Ladies.

Carter, Duchovny and Anderson celebrated the 20th anniversary of the series at a July 18, 2013, panel at San Diego Comic-Con hosted by TV Guide. During the discussion, Anderson discussed Scully's influence on female fans, relating that a number of women have informed her that they pursued physics careers because of the character. Anderson also indicated that she was not in favor of an X-Files miniseries, and Duchovny ruled out working with her on an unrelated project, but both expressed willingness to do a third feature film. Carter was more reserved at the idea, stating, "You need a reason to get excited about going on and doing it again." On July 16, 2008, Carter and Spotnitz donated several props from the series and new film to the Smithsonian's National Museum of American History, including the original pilot script and the "I Want to Believe" poster from Mulder's office.

In a 2018 interview with The Straits Times, series' writers Jim Wong and Glenn Morgan acknowledged that the show likely played a role in bringing conspiracy theories to a mainstream audience, helping to erode trust in public institutions. Similarly, in a 2021 New York Times op-ed, series creator Chris Carter wrote: "'The Truth Is Out There', 'Trust No One', 'Deny Everything' went the provocative catchphrases on The X-Files, but that was in the '90s, when we had a relatively shared reality. The slogans are now a fact of life." Vanity Fair writer Jordan Hoffman suggested that Carter's op-ed was imbued with "a bit of a mea culpa vibe".
