= Beyond the Sea (The X-Files) =

- The X-Files episode
- Episode no.: Season 1 Episode 13
- Directed by: David Nutter
- Written by: Glen Morgan; James Wong
- Production code: 1X12
- Original air date: January 7, 1994
- Running time: 45 minutes

Guest appearances
- Brad Dourif as Luther Lee Boggs; Don Davis as Captain William Scully; Sheila Larken as Margaret Scully; Lawrence King-Phillips as Lucas Jackson Henry

Episode chronology
← Previous "Fire"	Next → "Gender Bender"
- The X-Files season 1

"Beyond the Sea" is the thirteenth episode of the first season of the American science fiction television series The X-Files, premiering on the Fox network on January 7, 1994. It was written by co-executive producers Glen Morgan and James Wong, and directed by David Nutter. The episode is a "Monster-of-the-Week" story, unconnected to the series' wider mythology, although it deepens the characterization of Scully through the introduction of her parents. Despite a mediocre Nielsen rating compared to other episodes of the first season, "Beyond the Sea" received a largely positive reception amongst critics.

The show centers on FBI agents Fox Mulder (David Duchovny) and Dana Scully (Gillian Anderson) who work on cases linked to the paranormal, called X-Files. The plot of the episode sees Scully's father die and her skepticism put to the test by Luther Lee Boggs, a prisoner on death row who claims to have psychic powers.

The episode showed the protagonists reversing their usual roles of "believer" and "skeptic" for the first time and introduced the theme of father figures that would continue throughout the series. Critical commentary has noted parallels between the character of Dana Scully and that of Clarice Starling from The Silence of the Lambs (1991).

== Plot ==
Dana Scully (Gillian Anderson) entertains her parents, William (Don Davis) and Margaret (Sheila Larken), shortly after Christmas. After they leave, she falls asleep on her sofa. Several hours later, she wakes up to see her father sitting across from her, speaking silently. The telephone rings, she looks again at the chair and sees that it is empty. She takes the call — from her mother, who tells her that her father died of a heart attack an hour earlier.

In North Carolina, a young couple are kidnapped by a man impersonating a police officer. Fox Mulder (David Duchovny) tells Scully that Luther Lee Boggs (Brad Dourif), a serial killer he helped catch years before, has claimed to have had psychic revelations about the kidnapping and has offered to help police in exchange for his death sentence being commuted. Mulder is unusually skeptical about Boggs' claims.

Visiting Boggs in prison, the agents give him a piece of "evidence" from which he has a vision, only to be told it is really a piece of Mulder's T-shirt. Satisfied that he is lying, the pair prepare to leave. However, Scully looks back at Boggs and sees another vision of her father, then back to Boggs, who begins to sing the song that had been played at the funeral for Scully's father: "Beyond the Sea". Scully does not tell Mulder about this, and the pair discuss the possibility that Boggs has orchestrated the kidnapping with a partner to avoid execution.

Mulder and Scully have a fake newspaper produced which declares the couple have been found, hoping to trick Boggs into contacting his accomplice. He does not fall for the trick but gives the agents vague clues about the case. Scully, acting on these, first finds a warehouse where the couple had been held, and later leads Mulder and several other agents to a boathouse where the kidnapper is holding the couple. The girl is rescued, but the kidnapper shoots Mulder and escapes with the boyfriend. Following this, Mulder and the girl are sent to the hospital.

Scully attempts to have Boggs' sentence commuted but is rejected by the judge. Boggs is then visited by Scully, who tells him he has his "deal". Boggs then gives information about the kidnapper's new location, warning her to avoid "the devil". He tells her he knows she was lying about the deal, but also knows she tried her best. Scully then leads several agents to the location Boggs gave her — a brewery — where they rescue the kidnapped boyfriend. Scully chases the kidnapper as he flees but stops in her tracks when he runs along a gantry beneath the brewery's logo — a leering blue devil. The gantry gives way, and the kidnapper falls to his death.

Scully speaks to Boggs again, suggesting that if he had orchestrated the kidnapping, the kidnapper would have been aware of the danger he warned her about. Boggs claims to be able to contact her father and offers to relay one last message from him if she will attend his execution. As he is about to be executed, Boggs sees that Scully has not attended.

Scully visits Mulder in the hospital, explaining that she changed her mind and now believes Mulder's theory that Boggs arranged everything. She cites as evidence that if Boggs knew she was Mulder's partner, Boggs could have looked up the information about her father's death and used that information to manipulate her. Mulder asks her why she was afraid of believing, even if it meant losing the chance to hear from her father again through Boggs. She tells him that she did not need to hear anything, because she already knew what her father would have said.

== Production ==
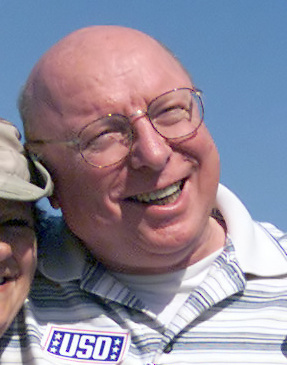
Don Davis played Captain William Scully.

"Beyond the Sea" was written by co-executive producers Glen Morgan and James Wong; it was their fourth script for the series. The episode was directed by David Nutter. As Morgan and Wong explained, their episode was written in response to criticisms of the show's initially limited characterization of Scully. Wong said, "Gillian Anderson needed to show off her talents more, and this was a perfect opportunity to dispel those notions that Scully will never believe. It was time for the character to grow, because she was just doing the same kind of thing too often." Executives at the Fox network vetoed the idea two times before Carter told them, "We're doing it."

Don Davis was cast as Scully's father, making him one of several X-Files guest stars to have previously appeared on the ABC mystery serial drama television series Twin Peaks. Davis would go on to reprise his role as William in the second-season episode "One Breath". Sheila Larken, who played Scully's mother, is married to the show's co-executive producer R.W. Goodwin. Larken returned for a further fifteen episodes in the role. Morgan and Wong fought hard to have veteran film actor Brad Dourif play the role of Luther Lee Boggs against concerns about the cost of hiring him. X-Files creator Chris Carter called the president of Twentieth Century Fox, Peter Roth, during Thanksgiving dinner and convinced him to let them cast Dourif for the part. Dourif was asked to appear in the episode with only four days of preparation. He originally refused the part until the producers gave him an extra week to prepare. While getting into character between takes, his deep breathing exercises turned his face bright purple.

This episode is a favorite of both creator Carter, who calls it his favorite episode of the first season and actress Gillian Anderson. Co-writer Morgan also praises it as a script he is proud of. Director Nutter says of the episode, "I think it's the most accomplished piece of directing of actors I've been able to do ... I think this episode really made a difference in how the audience looks at Scully. I think it brought a lot of dimension to her character and for her person it definitely had a lot of impact."

== Cultural references and continuity ==
The episode title, "Beyond the Sea", references Bobby Darin's song of the same name from 1959, which is played at the funeral for Scully's father. The appearance of Boggs greatly resembles Richard Ramírez. The names "Luther Lee Boggs" and "Lucas Henry" were inspired by real-life serial killer Henry Lee Lucas. The Luther Lee Boggs character is mentioned by Dakota Whitney (Amanda Peet's character) in The X-Files: I Want to Believe (2008). In one scene from this episode, Max Fenig's National Investigations Committee On Aerial Phenomena (NICAP) hat from the episode "Fallen Angel" can be seen hanging in Mulder's office.

Scully and her father's nicknames for each other — Ahab and Starbuck — are taken from Herman Melville's 1851 nautical novel Moby-Dick. Further references to the novel appear later in the series in the second season episode "One Breath" and the third season episode "Quagmire".

== Themes and analysis ==
In the episodes prior to "Beyond the Sea", the protagonists of The X-Files are firmly established in the roles of believer (Mulder) and rational scientist/skeptic (Scully). "Beyond the Sea" is the first episode in which these roles are reversed. Scully, vulnerable after the death of her father, is persuaded by Boggs' apparent psychic ability. Meanwhile, Mulder refuses to believe the serial killer, discounts any evidence in Boggs' favor and will only consider rational explanations. According to Jan Delsara, Scully is inclined to believe Boggs because she identifies with him: they both understand the pressure of high family expectations. Scully strongly desired to make her father proud, despite not fulfilling his expectation that she became a doctor, and Boggs, in killing his family, had hoped to kill their expectations and judgment of him. In contrast, Mulder's relationship with his parents, based on resentment of them for their failure to protect his sister (themes developed later in the series), makes him unwilling to identify with Boggs. While Scully follows her instinct and solves the case, Mulder gets shot and ends up in the hospital because of his doubts and skepticism. According to Joe Bellon, as the episode progresses, even Scully's personality becomes like Mulder's and "for all narrative purposes, she becomes Mulder for almost an entire episode." According to Dean A. Kowalski, this role reversal of the partners represents a "blending" of Mulder and Scully's characters that is present throughout the series.

Scully's co-option of Mulder's usual role also demonstrates the complexity of her character. Although she is strongly influenced by her scientific background, she has religious faith too. Paul C. Peterson notes that although this episode is not directly about religion, it shows the first of several visions Scully experiences throughout the series; later visions appear in episodes more directly related to religion and Scully's faith, such as "One Breath", "Elegy" and "All Souls". In this episode, her faith in her father ultimately proves stronger than her belief in the paranormal as she refuses to be tempted by Boggs. Rather than take him up on his offer to help her contact her father, Scully visits her partner in the hospital.

"Beyond the Sea" is the first episode to explore a central theme of Scully's character development — her attraction to, and conflict with, authoritative men. Throughout her career with the FBI she experiences conflict with patriarchal figures. In the fourth season episode "Never Again", she expresses a long-held fascination with father figures. This theme is introduced with her guilt and need for approval following her father's death in "Beyond the Sea", and continues in later episodes including "Irresistible", "Small Potatoes", "Bad Blood", and "Milagro".

The theme of father figures is one that is explored throughout The X-Files, in relation to both Mulder and Scully. As well as their own fathers, a number of characters play a paternal role to the agents in later episodes, including Deep Throat, the Smoking Man and Senator Matheson. Both of the protagonists have deep-rooted family issues and this episode is the beginning of the exploration of that story arc. A motif often employed in the show is that of mirroring, doubling or cloning. Scully's relationship with her father, first dealt with in "Beyond the Sea", is mirrored by that of Mulder's with his father — also named William — who dies at the end of the second season.

Comparisons have been drawn between the character of Dana Scully and that of FBI student Clarice Starling in The Silence of the Lambs (1991). Rhonda Wilcox and J. P. Williams note the similarities in their appearances, as well as their positions in a patriarchal working environment. In "Beyond the Sea" in particular, parallels can be seen. Like Starling, Scully has an emotional connection with — and a need to prove herself to — her dead father. After William Scully's death, his daughter becomes particularly concerned with whether or not he was proud of her. Although by the end of the episode, Scully seems to have come to terms with her father's opinion of her, her worries resurface later in the series when she fears that he would have been ashamed of her actions ("Anasazi"). The connection to Clarice Starling is further shown by Scully's encounter with Luther Lee Boggs, an apparently helpful serial killer, which echoes Starling's relationship with serial killer Hannibal Lecter.

== Broadcast and reception ==
"Beyond the Sea" was first broadcast in the United States on January 7, 1994, on the Fox network. In its original broadcast it was watched by 6.2 million households and 10.8 million viewers, according to the Nielsen ratings system. It received a 6.6 rating/11 share among viewers meaning that 6.6 percent of all households in the U.S., and 11 percent of all people watching television at the time, viewed the episode.

Author Phil Farrand rated the episode as the sixth-best episode of the first four seasons in his book The Nitpicker's Guide for X-Philes. A writer from the Vancouver Sun listed "Beyond the Sea" as one of the best standalone episodes of the show, saying that Brad Dourif's acting was "remarkably chilling". They noted that this episode was the first to center around Gillian Anderson's character, and showed signs of Scully's vulnerability. Connie Ogle from PopMatters ranked the episode amongst her "best" monster-of-the-week episodes. Ogle felt that Luther Lee Boggs was one of the "greatest" monster-of-the-week characters of the show, saying: "Spend a few minutes in Luther's skeevy presence, and alien abduction seems like a blessing". Writers for IGN named the episode their second favourite stand alone episode of the show, noting favourably how it "flips" the established dynamic between Mulder and Scully. In The Greenwood Encyclopedia of Science Fiction and Fantasy, Gary Westfahl described the episode as one of the most "highly regarded" stand alone episodes.

In a retrospective of the first season, Entertainment Weekly gave "Beyond the Sea" an A+, noting how it humanizes Scully and praising the casting of Dourif. Zack Handlen of The A.V. Club graded the episode a B+, praising Dourif as Boggs but wondered specifically about his intentions. Despite liking the fact that Scully was the focus of the episode and praising Anderson's performance, he thought that its "main flaw" was the way it handled her moral crisis, opining that she appeared too weak.
