= Notes 4 You =

Studio album by Bright
- Released: January 14, 2009
- Genre: J-pop
- Label: Rhythm Zone

Bright chronology
Brightest Star (2008)	Notes 4 You (2009)	Real (2010)

Notes 4 You is an album by vocal group Bright. The album contains all A-side single songs they released under the Rhythm Zone label so far. The DVD contains clips of their one-man Live show and a documentary of their Kyoto street live performances. The album was ranked at #47 and sold 2,805 copies in its first week.

== Track listing ==
1. Theme of Bright: Notes 4 You
2. Love & Joy
3. ソライロ
4. One Summer Time
5. So Long, Too Late
6. I’ll Be There
7. My Darling: I Love You feat. Scoobie Do
8. Interlude: Brighten Up
9. Watch Out
10. You Were Mine
11. 恋をして
12. 手紙 feat. K: Album ver.
13. Believe
14. Brightest Star: Unplugged (bonus track)

DVD track listing

1. Sora Iro (ソライロ) (music video)
2. Tegami (手紙) feat. K: Album ver. (music video)
3. One Summer Time (music video)
4. I'll Be There (music video)
5. Tears (live video)
6. Dance Interlude (live video)
7. Orenji (オレンジ): Unplugged (live video)
8. My Girl (live video)
9. Street Live In Kyoto: Document Video 2007–2008
10. Brightest Star (bonus live video)

== Chart ==
Daily	Weekly	Sales
22	48	2,805
