= Provenance (The X-Files) =

- The X-Files episode
- Episode no.: Season 9 Episode 9
- Directed by: Kim Manners
- Written by: Chris Carter; Frank Spotnitz
- Production code: 9ABX10
- Original air date: March 3, 2002
- Running time: 44 minutes

Guest appearances
- James Pickens, Jr. as Alvin Kersh; Cary Elwes as Brad Follmer; Bruce Harwood as John Fitzgerald Byers; Tom Braidwood as Melvin Frohike; Dean Haglund as Richard Langly; Sheila Larken as Margaret Scully; Neal McDonough as Motorcycle Man/Comer; Denis Forest as Lone Man; McNally Sagal as Overcoat Woman; James Parks as Agent Terry Sullivan; Alan Dale as Toothpick Man; Joe Colligan as Driver Agent; Brian Catalano as Passenger Agent; Randy Hall as U-Haul Driver; James Riker as Baby William; Travis Riker as Baby William; Laura Leigh Hughes as Kersh’s Assistant

Episode chronology
| ← Previous "Hellbound" | Next → "Providence" |
- The X-Files season 9

"Provenance" is the ninth episode of the ninth season of the American science fiction television series The X-Files. It premiered on the Fox network on March 3, 2002. The episode was written by series creator Chris Carter and executive producer Frank Spotnitz, and directed by Kim Manners. "Provenance" helps to explore the series' overarching mythology. The episode received a Nielsen household rating of 5.5 and was watched by 5.8 million households and 9.7 million viewers. It received mixed to positive reviews from critics.

The show centers on special agents of the FBI who work on cases linked to the paranormal, called X-Files; this season focuses on the investigations of John Doggett (Robert Patrick), Monica Reyes (Annabeth Gish), and Dana Scully (Gillian Anderson). In this episode, when rubbings from the spaceship resurface the FBI hides its investigation from the X-Files. Meanwhile, Scully is forced to take drastic measures when she discovers a threat to William.

"Provenance" introduced the character of the Toothpick Man, played by Alan Dale. This character became the leader of the New Syndicate and worked within the FBI during the show's ninth season. The episode makes reference to rubbings from an alien wreck, a direct continuation from the plots of the sixth season finale "Biogenesis" and the seventh season opener "The Sixth Extinction".

== Plot ==
Navajo rubbings are found in the satchel by a motorcyclist who crashed while attempting to cross the U.S.-Canada border. Dana Scully (Gillian Anderson) is called into a meeting with Alvin Kersh (James Pickens, Jr.), Walter Skinner (Mitch Pileggi), Brad Follmer (Cary Elwes) and a few unknown men. She is shown a copy of the rubbings and is asked whether she can identify them. After the meeting, Scully explains to John Doggett (Robert Patrick) and Monica Reyes (Annabeth Gish) that the rubbings are very similar to the ones she found on a wrecked spacecraft three years prior. Meanwhile, the motorcyclist uses an alien artifact which begins to heal the wounds from his crash.

Meanwhile, over in Alberta, a downed spacecraft is being excavated under the direction of Josepho, the leader of a UFO cult. At the FBI, Doggett breaks into Skinner's office and steals the rubbings, along with an FBI personnel file belonging to Agent Robert Comer (Neal McDonough), the motorcyclist. Reyes reveals that Comer's rubbings do not match those from Africa, suggesting the existence of a second craft. Meanwhile, Comer steals a truck, goes to Scully's apartment, overpowers Margaret Scully (Sheila Larken) and locks himself in William's room. Scully arrives and, after a struggle, is forced to shoot Comer when he tries to smother the baby.

The mortally wounded Comer tells Scully that William "has to die". Scully searches his jacket and discovers the artifact. Later, in Calgary, one of the cultists, the Overcoat Woman, sees a newspaper headline about Comer's shooting; she rushes to the dig site and informs Josepho. In Washington, Kersh admits to Scully and Doggett that Comer had gone undercover into Josepho's cult, and reveals that he was a former U.S. military officer. Kersh explains that Comer was given the assignment to investigate a series of death threats against Fox Mulder (David Duchovny).

As Reyes brings William back to Scully's apartment, Comer's artifact flies over William and hovers above his head. Scully, realizing something really is wrong, plans to drive William to somewhere safe. At the same time, Doggett notices the Overcoat Woman is watching them nearby. As Scully and Reyes drive away, Doggett confronts the woman at gunpoint, but she runs him over. Scully places William under the care of The Lone Gunmen, but they are soon ambushed by the Overcoat Woman. Upon finding an injured Doggett, Scully quickly rushes back to the Lone Gunmen, aware that someone is after her son. With Melvin Frohike (Tom Braidwood) and Richard Langly (Dean Haglund) incapacitated, the woman opens the back door of the van to find John Fitzgerald Byers (Bruce Harwood) holding William. The woman puts a gun to Byers' head.

== Production ==
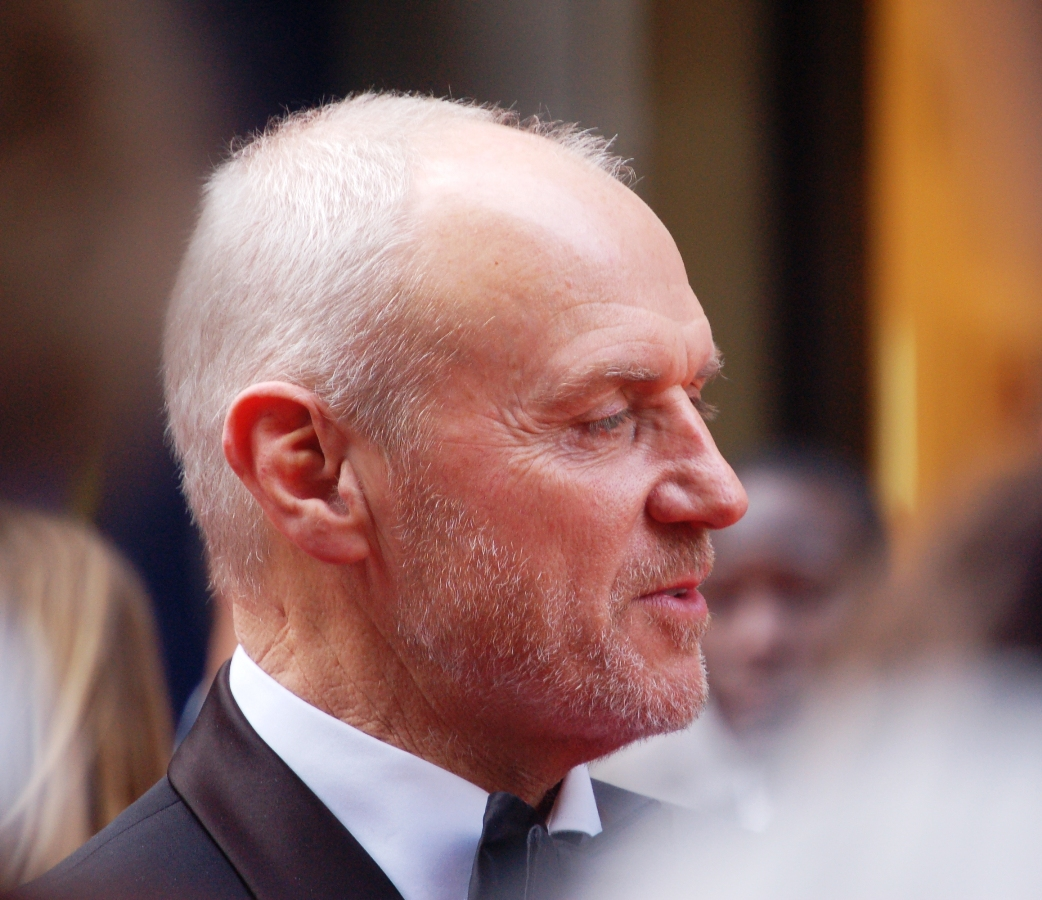
The episode marked the first appearance of Alan Dale as the Toothpick Man.

"Provenance" was written by series creator Chris Carter and executive producer Frank Spotnitz, and directed by Kim Manners. Manners was very pleased with Anderson's performance in the episode, later saying that her acting "was very sexual." He further elaborated, "There's some burning within her that really comes across on screen. She really is brilliant, and she brings so much; the camera loves her." A large portion of the episode was based on the ancient astronaut theory; a theory that proposes intelligent extraterrestrial beings have visited Earth in antiquity or prehistory and made contact with humans. The themes had previously been visited in the "Biogenesis"/"The Sixth Extinction"/"Amor Fati" story arc.

The episode marked the first appearance of Alan Dale as the Toothpick Man, the leader of the New Syndicate who works within the FBI. An interview with Digital Spy described him as "effectively [stepping] into the nicotine-stained chair of the departed Cigarette Smoking Man (William B. Davis) as the head of a shady new syndicate, although he was later exposed as an alien." Laura Leigh Hughes makes her third and final appearance as Kersh's Assistant. She had previously appeared in the sixth-season episodes "Triangle" and "Dreamland."

The scenes in Calgary were actually shot in the back of the Universal Studios lot in Los Angeles. In order to convert the Los Angeles cityscape into Calgary's, Mat Beck created a matte of the shot; the background buildings were then edited out. A separate shot of Calgary was superimposed in the background and the scenes were composited in post-production editing.

== Broadcast and reception ==
"Provenance" first premiered on the Fox network in the United States on March 3, 2002. The episode earned a Nielsen household rating of 5.5, meaning that it was seen by 5.5% of the nation's estimated households and was viewed by 5.8 million households. (Note: At the time of airing, the estimated number of households was 105.5 million. Thus, 5.5 percent of 105.5 million is 5.8 million households.) "Provenance" was viewed by 9.7 million viewers and was the 61st most watched episode of television that aired during the week ending March 3. The episode eventually aired on BBC Two on January 12, 2003. "Provenance" was later included on The X-Files Mythology, Volume 4 – Super Soldiers, a DVD collection that contains episodes involved with the alien super soldiers arc.

"Provenance" received mixed to positive reviews from television critics. Jessica Morgan from Television Without Pity awarded the episode an A− grade. Jeffrey Robinson from DVD Talk concluded that "Provenance", along with its follow-up "Providence", "does a fairly good job without including Duchovny" due to its adherence to "the series' main storyline [about] the government conspiracies."

Other reviews were more negative. Robert Shearman and Lars Pearson, in their book Wanting to Believe: A Critical Guide to The X-Files, Millennium & The Lone Gunmen, rated the episode one star out of five. The two noted that Anderson was constantly playing "a mother who's always crying, shouting or looking miserable" in the episode. They wrote that the episode's "characters no longer make sense" and that the plot has "been so required to dance through the little conspiracy hoops that there's no consistency any more." Furthermore, Shearman and Pearson criticized the idea to suggest that Mulder died in the episode, due to the fact that Carter announced Duchovny would return for the season finale. M.A. Crang, in his book Denying the Truth: Revisiting The X-Files after 9/11, criticised the plot of the episode, saying that it "throws up many elements that we've seen the series do better elsewhere...in the hope that something will stick".

== Bibliography ==
- Hurwitz, Matt; Knowles, Chris (2008). The Complete X-Files. Insight Editions. ISBN 978-1933784809.
- Shearman, Robert; Pearson, Lars (2009). Wanting to Believe: A Critical Guide to The X-Files, Millennium & The Lone Gunmen. Mad Norwegian Press. ISBN 978-0975944691.

This article incorporates material derived from the "Provenance" article on the X-Files wiki at Fandom (formerly Wikia) and is licensed under the Creative Commons Attribution-Share Alike 3.0 License (July 14, 2012).
