= The Sixth Extinction (The X-Files) =

- The X-Files episode
- Dana Scully examines photographs of the writing on the alien spaceship. The episode continued to introduce new aspects to the series' mythology, elements executive producer Frank Spotnitz described as "completely different."
- Episode no.: Season 7 Episode 1
- Directed by: Kim Manners
- Written by: Chris Carter
- Production code: 7ABX03
- Original air date: November 7, 1999
- Running time: 44 minutes

Guest appearances
- Mitch Pileggi as Walter Skinner; Mimi Rogers as Diana Fowley; John Finn as Michael Kritschgau; Michael Ensign as Dr. Barnes; JoNell Kennedy as Dr. Amina Ngebe; Anthony Okunbowa as Dr. Barnes' Driver; Warren Sweeney as Dr. Geoff Harriman; Abdoulaye N'Gom as Driver; Conrad Roberts as Primitive African Man; Mari Weiss as ICU Nurse

Episode chronology
← Previous "Biogenesis"	Next → "The Sixth Extinction II: Amor Fati"
- The X-Files season 7

"The Sixth Extinction" is the first episode of the seventh season of the science fiction television series The X-Files. It was first shown on the Fox network on November 7, 1999, in the United States. The episode was written by Chris Carter and directed by Kim Manners. "The Sixth Extinction" earned a Nielsen household rating of 10.6, being watched by 17.82 million people in its initial broadcast. The episode received mixed to positive reviews from critics.

The show centers on FBI special agents Fox Mulder (David Duchovny) and Dana Scully (Gillian Anderson) who work on cases linked to the paranormal, called X-Files. Mulder is a believer in the paranormal, while the skeptical Scully has been assigned to debunk his work. In the episode, Assistant Director Walter Skinner (Mitch Pileggi) and Michael Kritschgau (John Finn) work desperately in an attempt to discover what is wrong with Mulder, whose abnormal brain activity has rendered him imprisoned in his own head, but they are unaware of Agent Diana Fowley’s (Mimi Rogers) duplicity. In the meantime, Scully hunts for an ancient artifact in Africa.

"The Sixth Extinction" helped to explore new aspects of the series' overarching mythology and was the second episode in a trilogy of episodes featuring Mulder's severe reaction to the appearance of an alien artifact. The episode was written due to series creator Chris Carter's fascination with the possibility that extraterrestrials were involved in the great extinctions that had happened millions of years ago.

== Plot ==
On the coast of Côte d'Ivoire, Scully sits in her tent studying detailed photographs of the spacecraft half-buried in the beach nearby. A figure, the Primitive African Man, mysteriously appears before suddenly vanishing, after which Scully's tent is swarmed by flying insects. Back in the U.S., Walter Skinner visits a delusional Fox Mulder, who is being kept in a padded cell at a Georgetown hospital. Mulder seemingly attacks Skinner, but actually covertly passes him a torn shred of his hospital gown reading, "HELP ME".

Scully is visited by Dr. Amina Ngebe, Solomon Merkmellen's former colleague, who warns her to not tell any of the locals about the swarm or the Primitive African Man, although word is already out on the "African internet". Soon afterwards, one of the locals working on excavating the ship is apparently scalded by boiling seawater. With the arrival of Dr. Barnes another "plague" occurs: that night the ocean turns blood red.

Skinner revisits a heavily drugged Mulder, who cannot talk but writes "Kritschgau". Skinner visits Michael Kritschgau, now unemployed and living in a low-cost apartment, and convinces him to visit the hospital with him. Once there, Kritschgau believes Mulder has alien-induced mind reading abilities and injects him with phenytoin to slow down his brain activity. Later, Diana Fowley and his doctor arrive, and with his mind-reading abilities, Mulder tells Skinner that he knows about him being indebted to Alex Krycek, and Fowley's connections with the Smoking Man.

Scully, with Barnes' help, is able to translate some of the inscriptions on the spacecraft, which contains information on genetics and various religions. However, Barnes' behavior becomes increasingly erratic and, arming himself with a machete, he refuses to let Scully or Ngebe leave. Barnes realizes that the craft is bringing dead fish back to life. Scully and Ngebe take the opportunity to knock him out and escape. Scully sees the Primitive African Man again in the car as they drive off.

Skinner and Kritschgau put Mulder under additional tests to verify his abnormal brain activity. They again inject Mulder with phenytoin, but this time they are caught by Fowley; Mulder goes into a seizure. Meanwhile, Barnes, in a bizarre experiment, kills his driver, only for the driver to soon reanimate and kill Barnes instead. Scully flies back to the U.S. and visits Mulder at the hospital. On the African coast, Ngebe arrives with the police, finding Barnes dead and the spaceship gone.

== Production ==
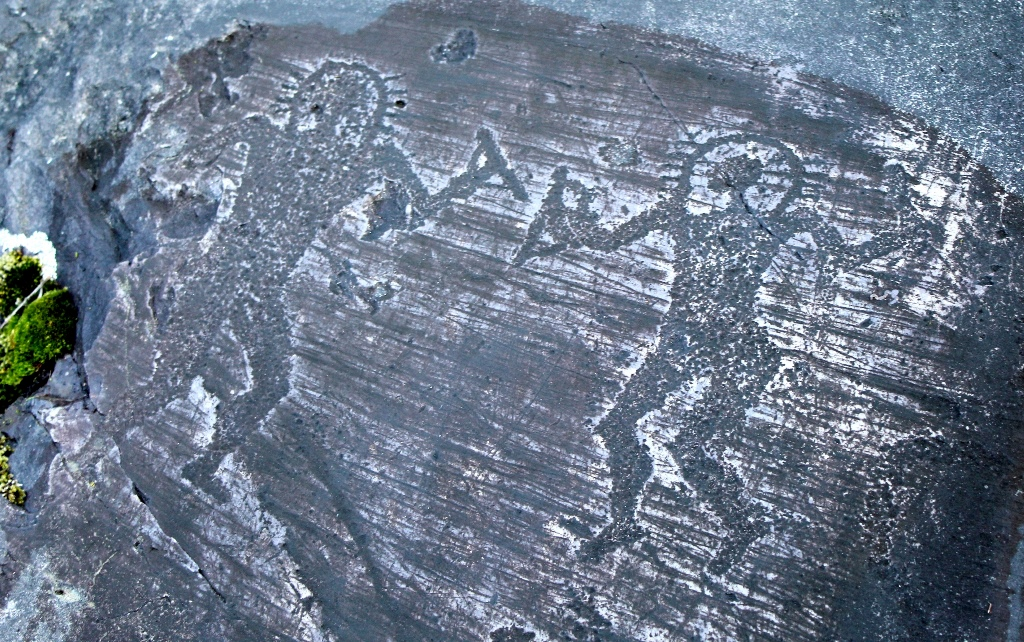
Part of the plot for "The Sixth Extinction" was based on the ancient astronaut theory (Rock engraves in Valcamonica, Italy).

Regarding this episode's origins, Frank Spotnitz said, "[We] destroyed all the stuff about Mulder's father, the project, and the Syndicate. All the things that had sustained us for six years were suddenly gone. We had no crutches. From that point on, every time we sat down to write a mythology show, we knew it was going to be a completely different challenge." Chris Carter believed that "The Sixth Extinction" functioned as a "transitional episode", stating, "I felt that, with 'The Sixth Extinction', I was just playing a supporting role and that the episode, essentially the middle episode of a three-episode arc, was just a transitional episode to get us to 'Amor Fati', which was really less about the mythology and more about Mulder's choices in life."

Because David Duchovny and Gillian Anderson both had other commitments at the start of the season, production for this episode was delayed. It ended up being filmed third in the season, after the episodes "Hungry" and "The Goldberg Variation". Carter wrote the episode simultaneously as Duchovny was working on the next episode, "The Sixth Extinction II: Amor Fati". Kim Manners said preparations were confusing since it was not clear how the storylines would unfold and feed into one another. Spotnitz said of the end result, "For me, it was a lot like a fifties monster movie with Scully out on the beach with this guy going nuts with a machete, the bug attacks, and the sea of blood. Yeah, it was supposed to be serious business but, overall, I thought it was shaping up as a pretty entertaining hour."

The producers had to move the filming of the beach sequences from the previous episodes due to changes in the tides at that time of year. Similar to the previous episode, the large spaceship wreck was created with computer-generated graphics. The sequence where the locals are boiled by the ocean water required the use of "various degrees of burn makeup", which was applied to stunt performers. An underwater camera was then used to capture these actors as they writhed in pain. To create the scene in which a huge number of insects swarm Scully's tent, popcorn and foam peanuts were blown by a large fan onto the soundstage; images of crickets were then digitally composited on top of the detritus during post-production. Over 50,000 dead crickets were also rented by the show and strewn about on the stage of the floor to further the effect.

A large portion of the episode was based on the ancient astronaut theory, which proposes that intelligent extraterrestrial beings have visited Earth in antiquity or prehistory and made contact with humans. Frank Spotnitz was astounded at how little negative fan mail the show received, despite the fact that the "Biogenesis"/"The Sixth Extinction"/"Amor Fati" story arc heavily hinted that aliens were the originators of the notion of God and religion. He credited the manner in which the show handled this delicate subject, saying, "Often in the past, we've done stuff where I was sure we would get angry letters. But we rarely do. And the reason is because of the way we handle things. In 'Amor Fati' we treated the religious side with respect." The ancient astronaut themes were later revisited in the two season nine episodes "Provenance" and "Providence."

== Reception ==
=== Ratings ===
"The Sixth Extinction" was first shown in the United States on November 7, 1999. This episode earned a Nielsen rating of 10.6, with a 16 share, meaning that roughly 10.6 percent of all television-equipped households, and 16 percent of households watching television, were tuned in to the episode. It was viewed by 17.82 million viewers and was the most watched episode of the seventh season in the United States. The episode aired in the United Kingdom and Ireland on Sky1 on May 7, 2000, and received 1.00 million viewers and was the third most watched episode that week. The episode was later included on The X-Files Mythology, Volume 3 – Colonization, a DVD collection that contains episodes involved with the alien Colonists' plans to take over the earth.

=== Reviews ===
"The Sixth Extinction" received mixed to positive reviews from critics. Tom Kessenich, in his book Examination: An Unauthorized Look at Seasons 6–9 of the X-Files gave the episode a positive review, noting that the episode takes the themes of "Biogenesis" and "runs with them". Ken Tucker of Entertainment Weekly awarded the episode a "B+". Tucker praised series creator Chris Carter's writing ability, stating that "the kickoff episode suggests the author's limitless imagination for sustaining his alien-nation tropes". Robert Shearman, in his book Wanting to Believe: A Critical Guide to The X-Files, Millennium & The Lone Gunmen, rated the episode three-and-a-half stars out of five. The author called the episode "the most arresting season opener in years" and noted that it "promises that maybe there's life in the old mythology yet." Shearman, however, did critique the lack of finality to the episode, but attributed most of this to the fact that the episode was the second of a three-part mythology tale.

Den of Geek writer Nina Sordi ranked "The Sixth Extinction," along with "Biogenesis" and "The Sixth Extinction II: Amor Fati," as the fifth best episode of the series, writing, "it is evident that as [The X-Files] progressed, the episodes surrounding those storylines and the breaking points Mulder and Scully endured push them further and further towards total, irreversible defeat. This is especially poignant when viewing this anxiety inducing trio of episodes." Monica S. Kuebler of Exclaim magazine called "The Sixth Extinction", along with "Biogenesis" and "Amor Fati", one of the "best" episodes during the show's "colonization" phase. Kenneth Silber of Space.com wrote positively of the episode, hoping that it foreshadowed answers to come, writing "As the middle installment of a three-part story and what was then thought to be the final season premiere of The X-Files, 'The Sixth Extinction' is suffused with a somber pre-apocalyptic mood, but one vivified by the possibility that soon we'll have answers to the most important outstanding mysteries of the series."

Not all reviews were so positive. Paula Vitaris from Cinefantastique gave the episode a negative review and awarded it one-and-a-half stars out of four. She noted that "Mulder's situation is handled just poorly" and argued that Mulder's illness was created solely to provide a cross-season cliffhanger. Emily VanDerWerff of The A.V. Club awarded the episode a "C" and called it a "weird bridge". Largely, she criticized the episode for featuring "no real twists or complications here" in lieu of "things just […] getting worse along a linear path".

== Bibliography ==
- Hurwitz, Matt; Knowles, Chris (2008). The Complete X-Files. Insight Editions. ISBN 978-1-933784-80-9.
- Kessenich, Tom (2002). Examination: An Unauthorized Look at Seasons 6–9 of the X-Files. Trafford Publishing. ISBN 1-55369-812-6.
- Shapiro, Marc (2000). All Things: The Official Guide to the X-Files Volume 6. Harper Prism. ISBN 0-06-107611-2.
- Shearman, Robert (2009). Wanting to Believe: A Critical Guide to The X-Files, Millennium & The Lone Gunmen. Mad Norwegian Press. ISBN 978-0-9759446-9-1.
