= Two Fathers (The X-Files) =

- The X-Files episode
- Cassandra Spender's wound oozes green fluid and then heals itself.
- Episode no.: Season 6 Episode 11
- Directed by: Kim Manners
- Written by: Chris Carter; Frank Spotnitz
- Production code: 6ABX11
- Original air date: February 7, 1999
- Running time: 45 minutes

Guest appearances
- William B. Davis as Cigarette Smoking Man; Nicholas Lea as Alex Krycek; Mitch Pileggi as Walter Skinner; Mimi Rogers as Diana Fowley; Chris Owens as Jeffrey Spender; Brian Thompson as Alien Bounty Hunter; Veronica Cartwright as Cassandra Spender; Don S. Williams as First Elder; George Murdock as Second Elder; Al Ruscio as Fourth Elder; Frank Ertl as Fifth Elder; Nick Tate as Eugene Openshaw; James Newman as Lead Surgeon; Damon P. Saleem as Pick Up Player

Episode chronology
← Previous "Tithonus"	Next → "One Son"
- The X-Files season 6

"Two Fathers" is the eleventh episode of the sixth season and the 128th episode overall of the science fiction television series The X-Files. The episode first aired in the United States and Canada on February 7, 1999, on the Fox Network and subsequently aired in the United Kingdom on Sky1. It was written by executive producers Chris Carter and Frank Spotnitz and directed by Kim Manners. The episode earned a Nielsen rating of 11.5, a total of 18.81 million viewers. The episode received mostly positive reviews.

The show centers on FBI special agents Fox Mulder (David Duchovny) and Dana Scully (Gillian Anderson) who work on cases linked to the paranormal, called X-Files. Mulder is a believer in the paranormal, while the skeptical Scully has been assigned to debunk his work. "Two Fathers" follows a story which would lead to the destruction of the Syndicate: with the unexpected return of Cassandra Spender and the alien rebels, members of the Syndicate prepare themselves for the final invasion.

"Two Fathers" was written in order to eliminate the Syndicate and relaunch the series' mythology. With the series being shot in Los Angeles, many members of The X-Files crew had to adjust scenes and filming techniques in order to achieve the "dark and gray feel" that had been a result of filming in Vancouver, British Columbia. The episode is the first of a two-part episode and continues with the episode "One Son".

== Plot ==
In a train car, doctors cut into Cassandra Spender, whose wound emits a green fluid before healing. Just after Dr. Eugene Openshaw declares that the Syndicate's twenty-five-year project complete, Alien Rebels suddenly attack and kill all the doctors except Openshaw. Cassandra is later rescued and then reunited with her son, Jeffrey Spender, but she asks to see Fox Mulder (David Duchovny). Elsewhere, Openshaw tells the Smoking Man (William B. Davis) that Cassandra is the first successful alien-human hybrid and that she must be killed.

Cassandra tells Mulder and Dana Scully (Gillian Anderson) that the alien Colonists intend to invade Earth and that the Rebels mutilate their own faces to prevent infection with the black oil. Mulder and Scully, recognizing similarities between the attack and murders from the previous year, decide to investigate the goings-on. In doing so, they discover that the Cigarette Smoking Man is Spender's father and that he was connected to William Mulder. However, their unauthorized investigation leads to their suspension from the FBI.

Meanwhile, an Alien Rebel kills a Syndicate elder and assumes his identity. At a later Syndicate meeting, the disguised Rebel proposes that the humans ally themselves with the Rebels to fight off the Colonists. The Smoking Man, however, realizes that the elder has been replaced and orders Spender to kill the disguised Rebel; when Spender fails, Alex Krycek does it for him. Krycek then tells Spender that his father was responsible for Cassandra's abductions and that Spender has been protecting his father's work.

Elsewhere, Mulder warns Walter Skinner that Cassandra is in danger. Later, she escapes from the hospital and arrives at Mulder's apartment. She begs him to kill her, explaining that she is the culmination of the Syndicate's work: a successful alien-human hybrid whose existence, if discovered by the Colonists, will trigger colonization.

== Production ==
The plan to eliminate the Syndicate and relaunch the series' mythology in a new direction was originally conceived in September 1998. Director Kim Manners stated "I've said for years that the show really resolved itself, if you will, by accident. The whole story line of the Syndicate and the bees and the aliens and the chips in the neck, they all seemed to just accidentally fall into place and create an intriguing, mysterious storyline that eventually got so mysterious and so intriguing that Chris had to blow it up, because he couldn't deal with it anymore."

The original script featured various flashback sequences, with actors Peter Donat, William B. Davis and Veronica Cartwright all appearing around twenty-to-thirty years younger. The production crew applied various types of makeup on the actors to "de-age" them. However, the writers eventually came to the conclusion that it "just didn't [...] work", so they cut out most of that storyline, which ultimately led to the creation of a whole new direction in which the Cigarette Smoking Man provided a monologue explaining the history of the project instead. The first scene was shot in Long Beach, California.

The scene in which Jeffrey Spender visited his mother, Cassandra Spender, was shot in Los Angeles. Those members of The X-Files crew who had moved with the show from Vancouver to Los Angeles still had problems adjusting to the changes when filming an episode. They were forced to adjust to changes in the sunlight, since Vancouver had this "dark and gray feel" compared to California's sunny atmosphere. Kim Manners felt it was difficult to "get[ting] used to" the new filming area. This episode marks the first time new stock footage was used for the J. Edgar Hoover Building in over five years.

The Second Elder's house was in a relatively expensive neighborhood in Los Angeles. Manners stated that he was "very nervous" when filming this scene because the crew needed to create a fire inside the house, which was done by Kelly Kerby and Bobby Calvert. When the faceless alien attacks the Second Elder, a special effects crew member can be seen behind a window "running with his rig", according to Manners.

== Release and reception ==
The episode earned a Nielsen household rating of 11.5, with a 16 share. It was viewed by a total of 18.81 million viewers in the United States. The episode was the third highest rated episode of the sixth season. The episode debuted in the United States and Canada on February 7, 1999, at the Fox Network. The episode aired in the United Kingdom and Ireland on Sky1 on May 16, 1999, and received 0.72 million viewers, making it the third most watched episode that week.

Veronica Cartwright was nominated for an Emmy for "Outstanding Guest Actress in a Drama Series" for her role in this episode and "One Son", and the make-up department was nominated for an Emmy award in the category "Outstanding Makeup for a Series" and won. The episode was later included on The X-Files Mythology, Volume 3 – Colonization, a DVD collection that contains episodes involved with the alien Colonist's plans to take over the earth.

The episode received mostly positive reviews from critics. Tom Kessenich, in his book Examination: An Unauthorized Look at Seasons 6–9 of the X-Files wrote positively of the episode, saying it "wonderfully" developed the show's characters as "it unveiled many of the answers to the questions that have been dangling about for some time without using Mulder or Scully as conduits for many of these answers." The main reason behind creating a resolution to the Syndicate arc was that Chris Carter thought the series was going to be cancelled by early 2000. While promoting the episode, Carter said it would give many long-waited answers but at the same time create new ones. Earl Cressey from DVD Talk named "Two Fathers," along with its follow-up "One Son," as one of the "highlights of season six." Joyce Millman from Salon magazine said the episode (along with "One Son") was one "of the most coherent, [...] almost unbearably tense, hours in the series' run". The Michigan Daily reviewer Melissa Runstrom said "Two Fathers" along with "One Son" and season finale "Biogenesis" were the highlights of the sixth season.

Emily VanDerWerff of The A.V. Club awarded the episode a "B−" rating. She concluded that the episode is an example of "propulsive fun" and applauded its myriad of attention-grabbing sequences. However, she was critical of its plot, noting that "the series pretty much just picks Cassandra to be the answer to a lot of questions" concerning the show's mythology. Not all reviews were so glowing. Paula Vitaris from Cinefantastique gave the episode a mixed review and awarded it two stars out of four. Vitaris wrote positively of the episode's filming, writing, "visually, the episode looks good […] the scenes in the hangar are eye-poppers, with doors slowly opening and aliens walking forward, obscured by bright light." However, she criticized the episode's plot, noting that "Two Fathers" was "heading straight down a path already trodden by dozens of books, short stories, movies, and other television shows."

== Bibliography ==
- Kessenich, Tom (2002). Examination: An Unauthorized Look at Seasons 6–9 of the X-Files. Trafford Publishing. ISBN 1-55369-812-6.
- Meisler, Andy (2000). The End and the Beginning: The Official Guide to the X-Files Season 6. HarperCollins. ISBN 0-06-107595-7.
