= Hungry (The X-Files) =

- The X-Files episode
- Rob Roberts reveals his true nature to Dr. Rinehart, his therapist. Actor Chad Donella, chosen because of his "subtle, interesting qualiti[es]," was called a "great little actor" by Kim Manners.
- Episode no.: Season 7 Episode 3
- Directed by: Kim Manners
- Written by: Vince Gilligan
- Production code: 7ABX01
- Original air date: November 21, 1999
- Running time: 44 minutes

Guest appearances
- Chase Hampton as Donald Pankow; Chad Donella as Rob Roberts; Mark Pellegrino as Derwood Spinks; Bill Lee Brown as Mr. Rice; Kerry Zook as Lucy; Steve Kiziak as Private Investigator; Judith Hoag as Dr. Mindy Rinehart; Kevin Porter as Motivational Speaker; Lois Foraker as Sylvia Jassy

Episode chronology
← Previous "The Sixth Extinction II: Amor Fati"	Next → "Millennium"
- The X-Files season 7

"Hungry" is the third episode of the seventh season of the science fiction television series The X-Files. It premiered on the Fox network in the United States on November 21, 1999. It was written by Vince Gilligan, directed by Kim Manners, and featured a guest appearance by Chad Donella. The episode is a "Monster-of-the-Week" story, unconnected to the series' wider mythology. However, unlike previous Monster-of-the-Week stories, "Hungry" is told from the monster's perspective. "Hungry" earned a Nielsen household rating of 9.6, being watched by 16.17 million people in its initial broadcast. The episode received mixed to positive reviews from critics.

The show centers on FBI special agents Fox Mulder (David Duchovny) and Dana Scully (Gillian Anderson) who work on cases linked to the paranormal, called X-Files. Mulder is a believer in the paranormal, while the skeptical Scully has been assigned to debunk his work. In this episode, a fast-food employee with unusual cravings becomes the focus of an FBI investigation under the direction of Mulder and Scully. The victims appear with no brain and a suction hole in the forehead.

Gilligan wanted to try a "different" approach to The X-Files with "Hungry" by telling the main story through the eyes of the monster. Because both David Duchovny and Gillian Anderson were filming movies, Return to Me and The House of Mirth respectively, the production company decided to film "Hungry" at the start of the season, taking advantage of the episode's concept to minimize the filming time required of the two leads. Actor Chad Donella, who portrayed the monster, was chosen because he possessed a "subtle, interesting quality," according to casting director Rick Millikan. Manners was pleased with Donella's performance, calling him a "great little actor."

== Plot ==
In Costa Mesa, California, Donald Pankow demands service at a closed Lucky Boy fast food restaurant. At the drive-through window, he is attacked and pulled from his car. His body is later discovered with his brain removed. Fox Mulder (David Duchovny) and Dana Scully (Gillian Anderson) investigate. The only clue is a Lucky Boy employee button belonging to Derwood Spinks (Mark Pellegrino). Scully suspects Spinks because of his criminal record, but Mulder believes the victim's brain was removed by a proboscis and suspects another employee, Rob Roberts. Rob is actually a mutant human who disguises his true appearance and survives by consuming brains. As his hunger becomes increasingly uncontrollable, he kills and eats a private investigator.

Spinks confronts Rob with evidence linking him to Pankow's murder and attempts to blackmail him. Rob later breaks into Spinks' home to recover the evidence. When Spinks discovers him, Rob removes his disguise, reveals his true form, and kills him. Rob then meets counselor Dr. Mindy Rinehart and admits that he is struggling with an "eating disorder." Unaware of his true nature, she sends him to Overeaters Anonymous. At an OA meeting, Rob encounters his landlady, Sylvia Jassey, and the two bond, but his hunger overwhelms him and he kills her. Rob disposes of Sylvia's body and stages his apartment to suggest that Spinks attacked him.

Rinehart, now suspecting that Rob killed Pankow, decides to visit his apartment, where she discovers him preparing to leave town. She reveals her suspicions, upon which Rob shows her his true form, but her sympathy catches him off guard. The agents arrive with guns drawn after finding Sylvia's body. Rinehart urges Rob to be the good person she believes he can be, but he charges at Mulder and is shot, committing suicide by cop. As Rob lies dying, Rinehart asks, "Why?" He replies, "I can’t be something I'm not."

== Production ==
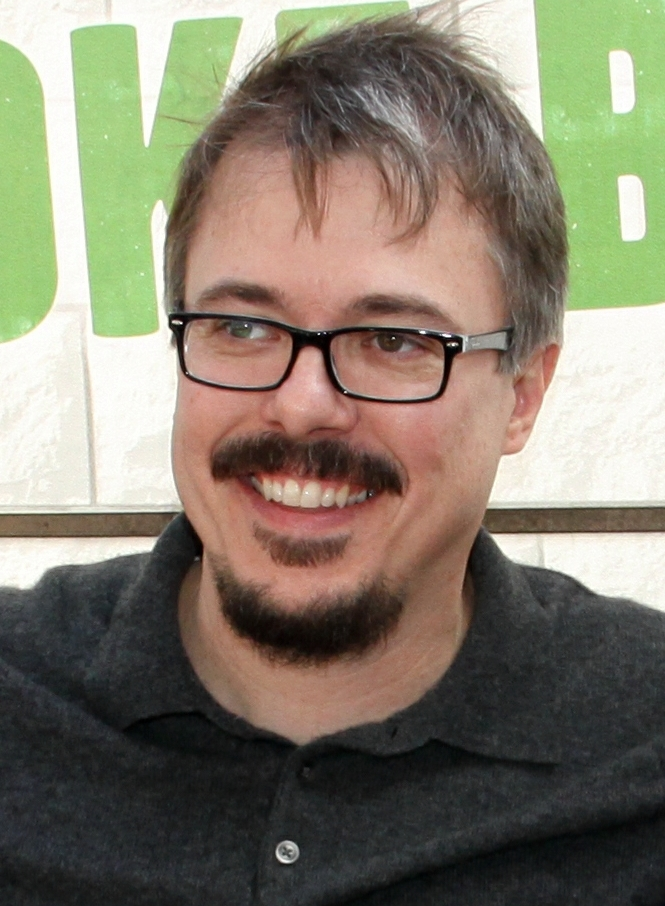
Vince Gilligan, writer of the episode, wanted to try a "different" approach to The X-Files.

=== Writing and casting ===
When Vince Gilligan wrote "Hungry," he wanted to write a "different" episode that was told from the viewpoint of the monster and featured Mulder and Scully as the antagonists. Series creator Chris Carter applauded this idea and called the resultant episode a "really great monster show." Gilligan's intention was for the monster to be relatable and resonate with the audience. He later said, "My intention […] was that at the end, when Mulder and Scully show up and kill the monster, to have the audience out there hoping that they would not show up."

Chad Donella was cast as the lead monster because he possessed a "subtle, interesting quality," according to casting director Rick Millikan. Director Kim Manners later described Donella as a "great little actor." Duchovny's stunt double, Steve Kiziak, played the role of the private detective—also called Steve Kiziak—that Roberts kills and eats. Kiziak later said, "It was a lot of fun to be in front of the camera." Kiziak had first appeared as Duchovny's body double in the third season episode "2Shy," and would later appear as a Mulder lookalike in "Fight Club."

The character of Rob Roberts was named after a real helicopter pilot from Indiana who Vince Gilligan had taken flying lessons from and who he had promised to name a character on the show after. The name of the therapist, "Mindy Rinehart", is the same as that of the real Roberts's wife. Gilligan quipped in an interview that the character was not actually based on the pilot apart from sharing a name, because the real Roberts "doesn't eat brains". However, some of Roberts's coworkers did serve him brain-shaped Jell-O as a joke after the episode came out.

=== Filming and location ===
As both David Duchovny and Gillian Anderson were filming the movies Return to Me and The House of Mirth, respectively, when season seven entered into production, the network decided to film "Hungry" before any of the other episodes, despite the fact that it would be aired third, after "The Sixth Extinction" arc. This allowed Duchovny and Anderson to film their minimal scenes for the episode and complete their movies with relatively little hassle. Some scenes that feature Mulder and Scully together were achieved using stand-ins and doubles due to the stars' conflicting availabilities. Duchovny and Anderson were only available for two combined days of filming for the episode.

When designing the sets for "Hungry", the production team found the Lucky Boy Burger restaurant to be relatively easy to create. Originally, the restaurant was supposed to be named Burgerlishious, but the restaurant location that was considered ideal for filming had a "Lucky Boy" sign that could not be removed. Later, the design department faced a challenge in creating Roberts' apartment, because the script did not give a detailed account of what it was to look like.

== Broadcast and reception ==
"Hungry" first aired in the United States on November 21, 1999. This episode earned a Nielsen rating of 9.6, with a 14 share, meaning that roughly 9.6 percent of all television-equipped households, and 14 percent of households watching television, were tuned in to the episode. It was viewed by 16.17 million viewers. The episode aired in the United Kingdom and Ireland on Sky1 on April 2, 2000 and received 0.68 million viewers, making it the channel's seventh most-watched broadcast that week.

The episode received mixed to positive reviews from critics. Robert Shearman, in his book Wanting to Believe: A Critical Guide to The X-Files, Millennium & The Lone Gunmen, rated the episode five stars out of five, calling the premise "Dexter a decade early." The author concluded that "the sympathy that Donella gives Rob as he shows his true colours is very touching. [...] The final moments [of the episode] are a typically smart touch to this neglected gem of a story." Rich Rosell from Digitally Obsessed awarded the episode 3.5 out of 5 stars and wrote that the episode features a "great setup, but the climax leaves the usual open-ended questions." Zack Handlen on The A.V. Club called the episode "perfectly acceptable" and awarded it a "B+". He was pleased with the episode's unique format, calling it a "good gimmick" that made an otherwise "forgettable at best" episode—had it been constructed in the typical fashion of The X-Files—into a memorable one. He was also positive towards the episode's use of humor, noting that it "is very much on target". Handlen, however, felt that the story showed the series' tiredness and did not possess much suspense to keep the watcher completely engaged.

Paula Vitaris from Cinefantastique gave the episode a more mixed review and awarded it two stars out of four. She noted that the episode "suffers from a syndrome that has afflicted a great many X-Files episodes in recent seasons […] the syndrome consists of the audience finding out early on who the guilty party is." Vitaris, however, did note that the episode's "saving grace" was Vince Gilligan's satiric writing tone; she called the scene featuring Roberts hallucinating that the burgers he was frying were actually brains "sick, but hilarious". Other reviews were more negative. Kenneth Silber from Space.com was critical of the episode, noting that, although the change in perspective was unique and interesting, "this bit of originality does not rescue the episode from a familiarity bordering on the mundane. It's not the first time we have seen genetic mutants who have an affinity for human body parts." Tom Kessenich, in his book Examinations, gave the episode a relatively negative review. Despite noting that the episode wasn't a "horrible" entry for The X-Files, Kessenich was unhappy with the characterization of Rob Roberts as well as the fact that the killer was revealed very quickly.

== Bibliography ==
- Gradnitzer, Louisa; Pittson, Todd (1999). X Marks the Spot: On Location with The X-Files. Arsenal Pulp Press. ISBN 1-55152-066-4.
- Kessenich, Tom (2002). Examination: An Unauthorized Look at Seasons 6–9 of the X-Files. Trafford Publishing. ISBN 1-55369-812-6.
- Shapiro, Marc (2000). All Things: The Official Guide to the X-Files Volume 6. Harper Prism. ISBN 0-06-107611-2.
- Shearman, Robert (2009). Wanting to Believe: A Critical Guide to The X-Files, Millennium & The Lone Gunmen. Mad Norwegian Press. ISBN 978-0-9759446-9-1.
