= Detour (The X-Files) =

- The X-Files episode
- The episode's monster, hiding by blending into a tree. The effects were made by using a specialized "barks suit" as well as computer technology.
- Episode no.: Season 5 Episode 4
- Directed by: Brett Dowler
- Written by: Frank Spotnitz
- Production code: 5X04
- Original air date: November 23, 1997
- Running time: 44 minutes

Guest appearances
- Scott Burkholder as Agent Michael Kinsley; Colleen Flynn as Officer Michele Fazekas; Merrilyn Gann as Mrs. Asekoff; Alf Humphreys as Michael Asekoff; Simon Longmore as Marty Fox; Anthony Rapp as Jeff Glaser; Tom Scholte as Michael Sloan; Tyler Thompson as Louis Asekoff; JC Wendel as Agent Carla Stonecypher

Episode chronology
← Previous "Unusual Suspects"	Next → "The Post-Modern Prometheus"
- The X-Files season 5

"Detour" is the fourth episode of the fifth season of the American science fiction television series The X-Files. It was written by executive producer Frank Spotnitz and directed by Brett Dowler. The episode aired in the United States on November 23, 1997, on the Fox network. The episode is a "Monster-of-the-Week" story, a stand-alone plot which is unconnected to the series' wider mythology. "Detour" received a Nielsen rating of 13.2, being watched by 22.8 million viewers, and received mixed reviews from television critics.

The show centers on FBI special agents Fox Mulder (David Duchovny) and Dana Scully (Gillian Anderson) who work on cases linked to the paranormal, called X-Files. Mulder is a believer in the paranormal, while the skeptical Scully has been assigned to debunk his work. In this episode, Mulder and Scully, while traveling to a conference with two other FBI agents, stop at a roadblock and join a nearby investigation of attacks by an unidentified predator.

Executive producer Frank Spotnitz was inspired to write the episode after watching the 1972 American thriller film Deliverance. "Detour" took nineteen days to film, over eleven more than the norm for The X-Files. Shooting was hampered by incessant rain. The episode's villains were created through a mixture of elaborate "bark suits" and digital technology. In addition, the episode contained several cultural references.

== Plot ==
Two men are surveying an area of the Apalachicola National Forest in Leon County, Florida when they are attacked and killed by unseen assailants with glowing red eyes. Later that day, Michael Asekoff and his son, Louis, are hunting for opossums with their dog, Bo, in the same stretch of woods. Upon discovering a surveyor's bloody jacket, Michael orders Louis to take Bo and run home. As Louis and the dog head off into the woods, two shots are heard.

Meanwhile, Fox Mulder (David Duchovny) and Dana Scully (Gillian Anderson) are carpooling with FBI agents Michael Kinsley and Carla Stonecypher en route to a "team building" seminar. When they are stopped at a roadblock by local police, Mulder decides to investigate, in part to get away from Kinsley and Stonecypher, whose perky nature annoys him. As he and Scully venture into the woods, they are informed by Officer Michele Fazekas that no conclusive evidence has been found to support Louis' report of a shooting. Mulder sees this as a perfect opportunity to ditch the seminar. Later, Mulder explains to Scully that no species native to North America will attack a stronger prey animal when there is a weaker target available, so it makes no sense that an animal would go after Asekoff and ignore his young son.

At the Asekoff residence that night, Bo becomes upset and begins barking. Mrs. Asekoff lets him out, but when she attempts to retrieve him, the dog refuses to budge. She turns around to discover that the door has been shut and locked from the inside. Louis hears his mother's screams and climbs out of bed, but a dark, shadowy figure with red eyes corners him. Louis barely escapes through the dog door and runs into Mulder, informing him that the creature is inside the house. The next morning, Mulder shows Scully some tracks inside the house that appear to be human. Based on the weight distribution, however, the assailant evidently travels on the balls of its feet rather than from heel to toe. Additionally, that the creature lured Louis' mother out of the house in order to get to him suggests to Mulder that the creatures are paranormal in nature.

Jeff Glaser (Anthony Rapp), a local technician armed with a FLIR device, joins Fazekas, Mulder, and Scully to search the woods for the creature. They soon spot two creatures on the FLIR which travel in separate directions, causing the four to split up. Fazekas is attacked and disappears. Mulder deduces that the creatures may be related to cryptids such as the Mothman. After a brief encounter with the creatures, Glaser takes off running and is swiftly attacked by one of them. Mulder is grabbed by the other creature, though it releases him after Scully manages to wound it with her firearm.

Mulder, wounded in the attack, and Scully spend the night in the woods together. The next morning, Scully falls through a hole in the ground while foraging for food and finds herself in an underground chamber where the bodies of the missing people are being stored. Spotting a pair of red eyes, Scully realizes she is trapped with one of the creatures and does not have her firearm with her. Mulder drops his down to her as the bushes behind him begin to rustle. He jumps into the hole as Scully shoots the creature and kills it. As they examine the dead creature, they notice its almost human-like features and wood-like skin. Nearby, the words ad noctem (Latin for "into darkness") are found carved into a tree trunk. Mulder, Scully, Asekoff, and Fazekas are rescued, but there is no sign of Glaser or the other creature.

Upon leaving the forest, Mulder states that the creatures may, in fact, be evolved versions of the first Spanish conquistadors who had first settled in the forest 450 years before. Although Kinsley finds this idea ridiculous, Mulder believes that centuries of seclusion could be adequate for such drastic adaptations to happen. Afterwards, Mulder realizes that the creatures presume others' presence in their territory as threatening and rushes to the hotel room where Scully is packing her things. After ascertaining that she is finished packing, he firmly urges her to vacate the room, which she does. As Mulder closes the door behind them, the camera then pans under the bed, where a pair of glowing eyes open.

== Production ==
Executive producer Frank Spotnitz was inspired to write the episode after watching the American thriller film Deliverance (1972). According to Spotnitz, "The idea of being stranded in a hostile environment [wa]s very interesting to me and so [wa]s the idea of something moving the brush that you can't see." The ending was left intentionally ambiguous, because, as Spotnitz reasoned, "It's scarier if you think [the monster] could still be out there." When the script was undergoing a rewrite, series writer Vince Gilligan helped by proposing a few story elements, including Mulder and Scully partaking in a "team builder" exercise.

Initially, scenes were filmed at the Lower Seymour Conservation Reserve in North Vancouver. Although the typical shooting time for an episode of The X-Files is eight days, "Detour" took nineteen days to film. To make matters more complicated, "it rained every day", according to second unit director Brett Dowler. This put a strain on the production crew because almost every main shot was slated to be outdoors and in the daylight. Because of the massive delays, changes were made: the actors' schedules were adjusted, Kim Manners was brought in to assist Dowler, and filming later moved to a soundstage to avoid the incessant rain. Spotnitz later noted, "I thought I'd come up with a very simple concept. Literally, one that was easy for the props people and all the other departments."

Initially, the producers wanted the antagonists of the episode to blend into the background using practical effects. Special effects supervisors Toby Lindala thus created unique "bark suits", but these suits proved awkward and demanding, leading to most of the effects being done on a computer during post-production. Visual effects supervisor Laurie Kallsen-George was tasked with creating the glowing red eyes of the monsters, which she created by merging various "eyeball images"—including shots of her family's dog—to achieve the desired effect.

== Cultural references ==
The plot and nature of the episode resemble the film Predator (1987), in which a creature that is able to perfectly camouflage itself, almost to the point of complete invisibility, stalks several humans in a dense jungle. While camping in the woods overnight, Scully sings "Joy to the World" by Three Dog Night while Mulder rests so that he can know she is awake and on guard. Originally, Scully was supposed to sing "I'm So Lonesome I Could Cry", a 1949 country song by Hank Williams. However, series creator Chris Carter requested something more "off the wall". Spotnitz, instead, chose "Joy to the World" and later said, "in retrospect, the song was perfect". When talking, Mulder claims that the only time he has ever thought about "seriously dying" was at the Ice Capades.

== Reception ==
=== Ratings ===
"Detour" premiered on the Fox network on November 23, 1997. This episode earned a Nielsen rating of 13.2, with a 19 share, meaning that roughly 13.2 percent of all television-equipped households, and 19 percent of households watching television, were tuned in to the episode. It was viewed by 22.8 million viewers.

=== Reviews ===
"Detour" received mixed to positive reviews from critics. Francis Dass of New Straits Times was positive toward the episode, calling it "imaginative". IGN named it the seventh best standalone X-Files episode of the entire series. The site called the sequence wherein "Scully holds a wounded Mulder and sings 'Jeremiah was a Bullfrog' [sic]" the "best scene" of the episode and praised the depth of the characters' relationship. Zack Handlen from The A.V. Club gave the episode an A and called it a "solid" entry in the series. Handlen complimented the episode's cold opening, structure, monster, and the relationship between Mulder and Scully; writing that the "core relationship" between Mulder and Scully "was remarkably strong". He also noted that their conversation in the woods was reminiscent of the third season episode "Quagmire" and was "sweet". Jonathan Dunn, writing for What Culture, highlighted "Detour" for its cinematic appeal and included it in the "5 Episodes [of The X-Files] That Could Be Made Into Movies" list.

Other reviews were more mixed. Paula Vitaris from Cinefantastique gave the episode a mixed review and awarded it two stars out of four. She called the scene featuring Scully singing to Mulder "a failed attempt to create 'a special X-Files moment'" and noted that the sequence was "a poor substitute for meaningful dialogue". Vitaris, however, did applaud the guest cast and called the creature's effects "very creepy". Robert Shearman and Lars Pearson, in their book Wanting to Believe: A Critical Guide to The X-Files, Millennium & The Lone Gunmen, rated the episode two stars out of five. The two noted that it replicated "Quagmire" too much for its own good and was "satisfied with the intention alone". They reasoned that because "it's so busy telling us how cute the interplay" between Mulder and Scully is, the episode "forgets to make it any good". Shearman and Pearson also called the Spanish conquistador revelation "so utterly left field it feels self-parodic."

== Bibliography ==
- Hurwitz, Matt; Knowles, Chris (2008). The Complete X-Files: Behind the Series the Myths and the Movies. New York, US: Insight Editions. ISBN 978-1933784724.
- Meisler, Andy (1999), Resist or Serve: The Official Guide to The X-Files, Vol. 4, London: HarperCollins, ISBN 0-00-257133-1
- Shearman, Robert; Pearson, Lars (2009). Wanting to Believe: A Critical Guide to The X-Files, Millennium & The Lone Gunmen. Mad Norwegian Press. ISBN 978-0975944691.
