= 2Shy =

- The X-Files episode
- Virgil Incanto following his imprisonment. Critics compared Incanto to the antagonists from "Squeeze", "Irresistible", and “Hungry”.
- Episode no.: Season 3 Episode 6
- Directed by: David Nutter
- Written by: Jeff Vlaming
- Production code: 3X06
- Original air date: November 3, 1995
- Running time: 45 minutes

Guest appearances
- Timothy Carhart as Virgil Incanto; Catherine Paolone as Ellen Kaminsky; Aloka McLean as Jesse; James Handy as Detective Alan Cross

Episode chronology
← Previous "The List"	Next → "The Walk"
- The X-Files season 3

"2Shy" is the sixth episode of the third season of the American science fiction television series The X-Files. It premiered on the Fox network on November 3, 1995. It was written by Jeff Vlaming, directed by David Nutter, and featured guest appearances by Timothy Carhart, James Handy, and Catherine Paolone. The episode is a "Monster-of-the-Week" story, a stand-alone plot which is unconnected to the series' wider mythology.

The show centers on FBI special agents Fox Mulder (David Duchovny) and Dana Scully (Gillian Anderson) who work on cases linked to the paranormal, called X-Files. In this episode, Mulder and Scully investigate a spate of "lonely hearts" murders targeting overweight women. The two eventually discover a mutant killer who is extracting the body fat from his victims after seducing them over online chat rooms.

The episode was the first one of the series to be written by Vlaming. "2Shy" also marked Steve Kiziak's first appearance as Duchovny's body double. The episode was viewed by almost 15 million people in its initial broadcast, and drew mixed reviews from critics. Although director Nutter based the gory scenes in "2Shy" on the earlier episode "The Host", the episode has drawn comparisons to "Squeeze", "Irresistible", and “Hungry”

== Plot ==
In Cleveland, a couple sit flirting in a car at night, having met over the Internet. The man, the charismatic and handsome Virgil Incanto (Timothy Carhart), suffocates his overweight date, Lauren, with a gelatinous substance he spits up. The next morning, a policeman finds Lauren's heavily dissolved body, covered in the substance.

Fox Mulder (David Duchovny) and Dana Scully (Gillian Anderson) are called in to investigate, as the victim's description seems similar to those of other victims of a lonely hearts killer still at large. Scully attempts to perform an autopsy on Lauren's body, only to find that it has liquified with only a skeleton remaining. Scully later discerns that the substance coating the body is a concentrated digestive enzyme, and that the remains are lacking in body fat.

Incanto prowls an online chatroom, arranging to meet with a similarly overweight woman named Ellen Kaminsky (Catherine Paolone). Incanto is interrupted by his landlord Monica Landis, who believes he is a writer and who is romantically interested in him. He ignores her and resumes chatting. Elsewhere, Mulder learns that Lauren met a man in a chatroom, and researches Incanto's online accounts. They find that he had started one account using a credit card taken from a previous victim.

Kaminsky stands up Incanto while he waits at a restaurant. He leaves, murdering a slightly overweight prostitute who injures him in a struggle. Incanto is forced to flee before he can fully dissolve the body. At the autopsy, Scully finds that the body's airways are choked with the same substance that dissolved Lauren. A forensic lab report reveals that the skin under the victim's nails contains no oils or fatty acids, convincing Mulder that the killer is sucking body fat from his victims.

Mulder finds passages of obscure medieval poetry in Incanto's e-mails and compiles a list of people who would have access to the texts from which these were taken. The agents, along with local detective Alan Cross (James Handy), agree to canvass everyone on the list. Meanwhile, Incanto, a translator of medieval Italian literature, receives a package while talking to Monica and her blind daughter, Jesse. He receives an e-mail from Kaminsky, asking to arrange another date; he is also questioned by Cross.

Returning home with Kaminsky, Incanto invites her inside, but quickly retracts his invitation when he sees the lights on in his apartment. After leaving Kaminsky, Incanto finds and kills Monica in his apartment after she discovers Cross' body in his bathtub. When Jesse asks Incanto about her mother's whereabouts, he denies seeing her. However, Jesse smells her mother's perfume in Incanto's apartment and calls the police. When they arrive, Incanto is gone, but his computer gives a list of women he has been in contact with. After trying to contact each woman in the given list, only two are unreachable, one being Kaminsky.

After Incanto comes to Kaminsky's apartment, she recognizes his facial composite distributed by the FBI. The agents arrive but after Mulder leaves in pursuit of who he believes to be Incanto, Scully is attacked by Incanto, who is still in the apartment; however, as they struggle, Kaminsky retrieves Scully's gun and fires on her attacker. Later, during questioning, a visibly weakened and deformed Incanto admits to the killings. He claims to have given his victims what they had wanted in return for what he needed (the fatty acids to keep him healthy). Incanto states: "I morti non sono più soli" (the dead are no longer lonely).

== Production ==
"2Shy" was written by Jeff Vlaming, who had previously worked for the series Weird Science. Vlaming's only other writing credit for the series was the later third-season episode "Hell Money". He had initially pitched the idea of a mutant who fed on body oils, which was eventually changed to body fats. The presentation of the character Virgil Incanto also went through several permutations, initially conceived as a creepy Phantom of the Opera-like recluse, and as a butcher who would be able to cut the fat from his victims, before the final "fairly normal-looking" version was decided upon.

Director David Nutter made sure that the episode contained several visceral moments, after the popularity of the "Flukeman" character in the earlier episode "The Host". Frank Spotnitz, the series' story editor, was initially wary of the concept as he felt it might be seen as offensive, but changed his mind when series creator Chris Carter convinced him the episode told "a good story", and was a "fun, old-fashioned sort of X-File".

The episode was primarily filmed in Vancouver's Quebec Street, with two nearby apartment buildings used for interior shots. "2Shy" marked the debut of Steve Kiziak as Duchovny's new body double. While filming a scene in which Mulder bursts through a door, Kiziak and the other body doubles mistakenly burst through the wrong apartment's door, interrupting the tenant's dinner party. Kerry Sandomirsky, who portrays Ellen Kaminsky's friend Joanne, had previously appeared in the first season episode "Roland", while Incanto's landlord was played by Glynis Davies, who had appeared in season one's "Tooms" and the second season episode "Irresistible".

== Broadcast and reception ==
"2Shy" premiered on the Fox network on November 3, 1995. The episode earned a Nielsen household rating of 10.1 with a 17 share, meaning that roughly 10.1 percent of all television-equipped households, and 17 percent of households watching TV, were tuned in to the episode. The episode was viewed by over 14.83 million viewers.

Zack Handlen, writing for The A.V. Club, had mixed feelings about the episode, ultimately rating it a B−. He felt that the character of Virgil Incanto was "wonderfully gross", although he "lacks the universal creepiness" of first season villain Eugene Tooms, from the episode "Squeeze". Handlen also felt that the episode was let down by the fact that it "takes it as a given that single women are targets", failing to give any real depth to its female characters. An overview of the third season in Entertainment Weekly also rated the episode a B−, and called Incanto a "fine example" of the series' "unassuming" villains, comparing him to Tooms and to the second season villain Donnie Pfaster. Robert Shearman and Lars Pearson, in their book Wanting to Believe: A Critical Guide to The X-Files, Millennium & The Lone Gunmen, rated the episode three stars out of five, calling it "a retread of Squeeze" and "a little too formulaic to be truly satisfying". However, Shearman and Pearson felt that the episode "has a heart to it" and "jogs along at a fair pace", also praising its gory visuals.

TV Guide listed Incanto among the scariest X-Files monsters, whilst UGO Networks listed the character as one of their best "Monster-of-the-Week" in the series, saying Scully's "pure revulsion at Incanto's instinctual need makes for one of The X-Files' finest final scenes".

== Bibliography ==
- Edwards, Ted (1996). X-Files Confidential. Little, Brown and Company. ISBN 0-316-21808-1.
- Gradnitzer, Louisa; Pittson, Todd (1999). X Marks the Spot: On Location with The X-Files. Arsenal Pulp Press. ISBN 1-55152-066-4.
- Lovece, Frank (1996). The X-Files Declassified. Citadel Press. ISBN 0-8065-1745-X.
- Lowry, Brian (1995). The Truth is Out There: The Official Guide to the X-Files. Harper Prism. ISBN 0-06-105330-9.
- Shearman, Robert; Pearson, Lars (2009). Wanting to Believe: A Critical Guide to The X-Files, Millennium & The Lone Gunmen. Mad Norwegian Press. ISBN 978-0-9759446-9-1.
