= The Sixth Extinction II: Amor Fati =

- The X-Files episode
- Fox Mulder's hallucination of the alien colonization. The scene was created by compositing special effects over a matte painting.
- Episode no.: Season 7 Episode 2
- Directed by: Michael Watkins
- Written by: David Duchovny; Chris Carter
- Production code: 7ABX04
- Original air date: November 14, 1999
- Running time: 44 minutes

Guest appearances
- Mitch Pileggi as Walter Skinner; Mimi Rogers as Diana Fowley; William B. Davis as Cigarette Smoking Man; Nicholas Lea as Alex Krycek; John Finn as Michael Kritschgau; Floyd Westerman as Albert Hosteen; Rebecca Toolan as Teena Mulder; Jerry Hardin as Deep Throat; Megan Leitch as Samantha Mulder; Arlene Pileggi as Skinner's Secretary; Warren Sweeney as Dr. Geoff Harriman; Brian George as Project Doctor; David Brisbin as Second Doctor

Episode chronology
← Previous "The Sixth Extinction"	Next → "Hungry"
- The X-Files season 7

"The Sixth Extinction II: Amor Fati" is the second episode of the seventh season of the American science fiction television series The X-Files. It was directed by Michael Watkins and written by lead actor David Duchovny and series creator Chris Carter. The installment explores the series' overarching mythology and concludes a trilogy of episodes revolving around Fox Mulder's (Duchovny) severe reaction to an alien artifact. Originally aired by the Fox network on November 14, 1999, "The Sixth Extinction II: Amor Fati" received a Nielsen rating of 10.1 and was seen by 16.15 million viewers. Initial reviews were mixed, and the plot and dialogue attracted criticism. Later critics viewed the episode in a more positive light, and several writers named it among the best in the series.

The X-Files centers on Federal Bureau of Investigation (FBI) special agents Mulder and Dana Scully (Gillian Anderson), who work on cases linked to the paranormal, called X-Files. Mulder is a believer in the paranormal, and the skeptical Scully was initially assigned to debunk his work, but the two have developed a deep friendship. In this episode, Scully returns from Africa to discover Mulder in a coma induced by exposure to shards from an alien spaceship wreck. After Mulder disappears from the hospital, Scully joins former government employee Michael Kritschgau (John Finn) and her boss Walter Skinner (Mitch Pileggi) to search for him. Meanwhile, in a dream, The Smoking Man (William B. Davis) offers Mulder a new life and a fresh start. After conferring with a vision of Scully, Mulder awakens from his coma and realizes his duty to prevent alien colonization.

Carter was interested in the possibility that extraterrestrials were involved in ancient mass extinctions on Earth and used these themes in the episode. Much of the episode was also inspired by Nikos Kazantzakis's novel The Last Temptation of Christ, and a scene showing an operation on Mulder has been thematically compared to the Crucifixion of Jesus. For the dream sequences, casting director Rick Millikan brought back many actors and actresses who had been absent from the show for several years, including Jerry Hardin as Deep Throat, Rebecca Toolan as Teena Mulder, and Megan Leitch as Samantha Mulder.

== Synopsis ==
=== Background ===
In the sixth-season finale "Biogenesis", FBI agents Fox Mulder (David Duchovny) and Dana Scully (Gillian Anderson) investigate an artifact inscribed with Navajo writing found in Côte d'Ivoire. While examining it in Washington, D.C., Mulder hears ringing sounds and suffers severe headaches. He turns to Agent Diana Fowley (Mimi Rogers), his former partner, for help before his mental health rapidly deteriorates and he is transferred to a psychiatric hospital. Meanwhile, Scully heads to New Mexico to ask a dying Albert Hosteen (Floyd Red Crow Westerman) to translate what is on the artifact: he discovers that the item includes passages from the Bible, and a map of the human genome.

In the seventh season premiere "The Sixth Extinction", Scully journeys to Côte d'Ivoire and discovers a wrecked alien spacecraft. After she examines the artifacts, she begins to believe that they hold the key to all of life's mysteries. Meanwhile, Mulder slips into a coma, and Assistant Director Walter Skinner (Mitch Pileggi) enlists the help of former Department of Defense agent Michael Kritschgau (John Finn) to determine what is wrong with him. The two discover that while Mulder's condition has made him unresponsive, it has given him telepathic powers. Scully, working in Africa, witnesses several strange events relating to the spacecraft before returning to Washington.

=== Plot ===
Teena Mulder (Rebecca Toolan) and The Smoking Man (William B. Davis) visit a still-hospitalized Mulder. After administering a drug that alleviates his paralysis, the Smoking Man reveals himself to be Mulder's father and takes him from the hospital. Meanwhile, Kritschgau visits Scully and claims that Mulder's contact with the artifact has reawakened the extraterrestrial black oil with which he was infected three years previously; because he is infected with the virus, Mulder is proof of alien life. Skinner, who has been looking for Mulder, tells Scully that Mulder's mother signed him out of the hospital.

The Smoking Man takes Mulder to an unfamiliar neighborhood; inside a new home, he finds his former informant Deep Throat (Jerry Hardin), who claims to have faked his own death to escape the burden he was under by being a part of the Syndicate and suggests that Mulder do the same. Mulder meets Fowley, and the two have sex.

On the hospital security tapes, Scully sees Mulder's mother talking to the Smoking Man but is unable to contact her. She receives a package containing a book on Native American spiritual beliefs, which describes how one man will prevent the impending apocalypse. Again visiting Kritschgau, she notices he has a stolen copy of her information on the wrecked spacecraft. After he admits hacking her computer, she deletes the files from his laptop.

Mulder is reunited with his sister Samantha (Megan Leitch) in his new life. He marries Fowley and they have children. The years pass quickly; he grows older and Fowley dies. Mulder is revealed to be dreaming everything: in reality he is in a government facility being tended to by doctors while the Smoking Man and Fowley watch. The Smoking Man is preparing to have portions of Mulder's cranial tissue—which have been infected by the alien virus—implanted into himself. During the operation, he admits that he believes that Mulder has become an alien-human hybrid, and that by taking Mulder's genetic material he alone will survive the coming alien invasion.

Mulder becomes an old man in his dream, accompanied by an unaging Smoking Man who tells him that Fowley, Deep Throat, Samantha and Scully have all died. The Smoking Man looks out the window, revealing an alien-induced holocaust. Back in reality, Alex Krycek (Nicholas Lea) kills Kritschgau, burns his papers and steals his laptop. Scully, having earlier been visited by Hosteen's spirit, awakens in her apartment to discover that someone has slipped a security card under her door. Using it, she enters the facility where Mulder is being held. In Mulder's dream, Scully meets him at his bedside and convinces him to break with his imaginary life. In reality, Scully finds Mulder and the two escape the facility. A week later, Scully meets Mulder at his apartment and tells him that Fowley has been found murdered. Mulder confides that, during his ordeal, Scully served as his "touchstone".

== Production ==
=== Writing ===
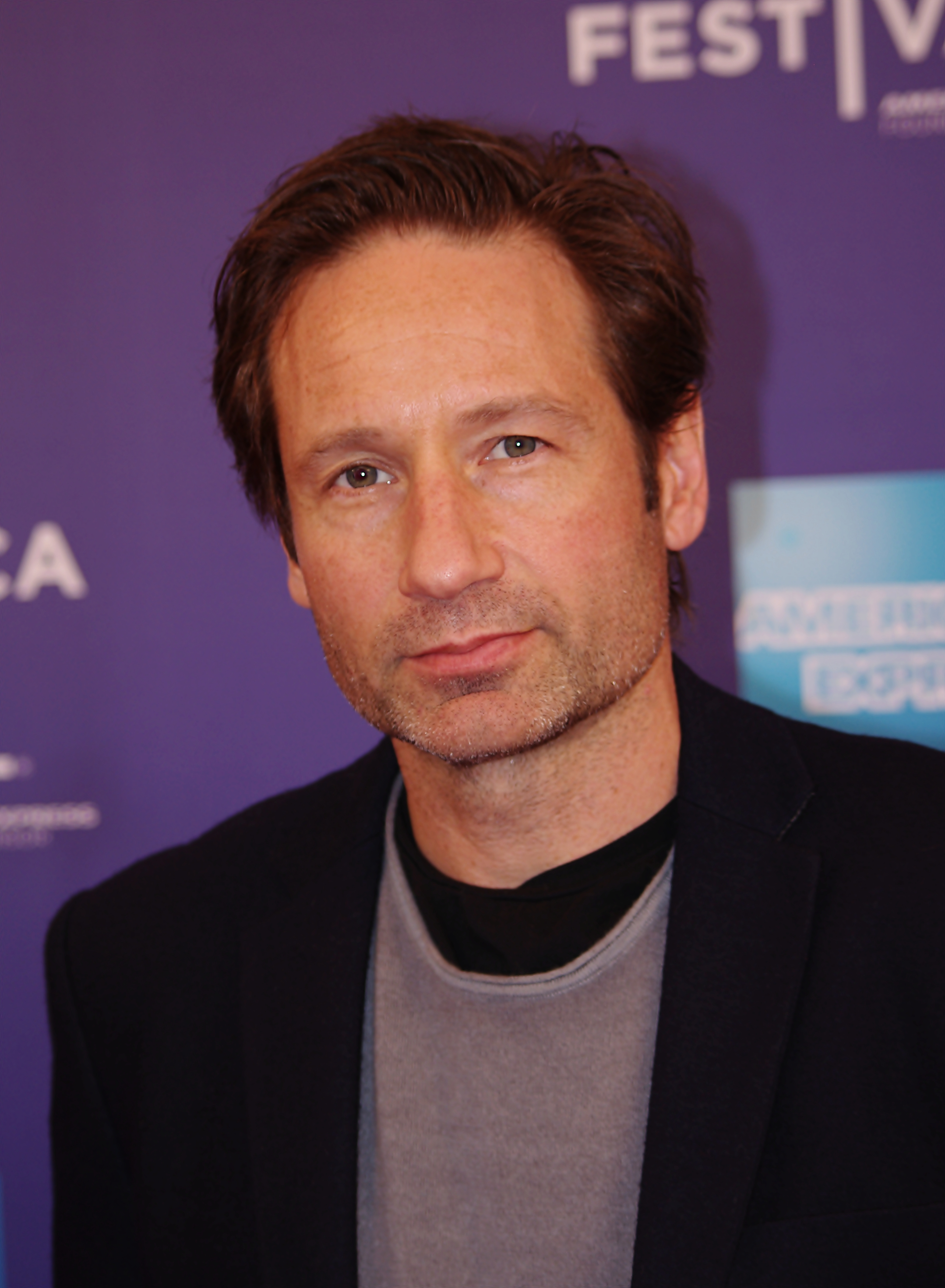
"The Sixth Extinction II: Amor Fati" was the second episode of the series written by David Duchovny.

"The Sixth Extinction II: Amor Fati" was written by Duchovny and The X-Files' creator Chris Carter, making it Duchovny's second on-screen writing credit, after the sixth-season episode "The Unnatural". He had previously co-developed the second-season finale "Anasazi" with Carter, and had received a teleplay credit for the third-season episodes "Avatar" and "Talitha Cumi". Duchovny worked on his portion of the script while Carter wrote the season premiere, "The Sixth Extinction". Carter then added his remaining portions to Duchovny's script after finishing his work on the previous episode. The tagline that appears in the opening credits for this episode is amor fati. (Note: For the first eight seasons, the series' title sequence ends with a shot of a gloomy sky and lightning striking a mountain. During this scene, the show's tagline "The Truth Is Out There" flashes onto the screen. Occasionally, for key episodes, this tag line was changed to some other word or phrase; for "The Sixth Extinction II: Amor Fati", the line was changed to the titular "Amor Fati".) This is a Latin phrase referring to the "love of fate", which is an important concept in the philosophical works of Friedrich Nietzsche. In the context of the episode, the subtitle has been interpreted by writer Charlton McIlwain in his book When Death Goes Pop: Death, Media & the Remaking of Community as a reference to the love of a predestined life, in this case, Mulder's dream. In her scholarly book chapter "The Last Temptation of Mulder", Amy Donaldson suggests the phrase means that Mulder must "love his suffering and passively accept it [and] actively embrace his journey ... and release his spirit to find new vigor."

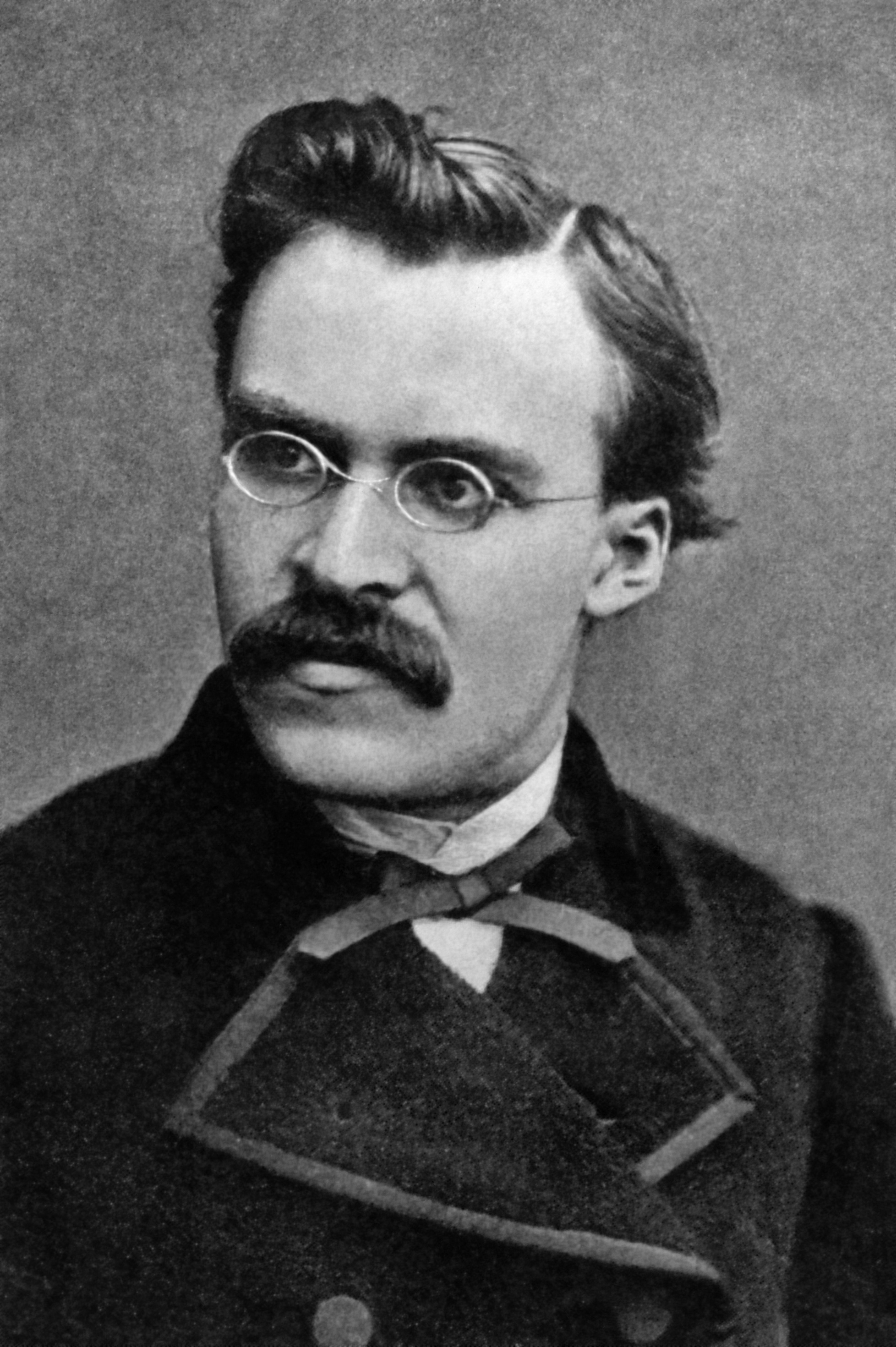
The term "Amor Fati" is an important concept in the work of the German philosopher Friedrich Nietzsche, related to his notion of the eternal return.

Mulder's dream and decisions in "The Sixth Extinction II: Amor Fati" are reminiscent of Jesus's actions in Nikos Kazantzakis's novel The Last Temptation of Christ. Duchovny, a fan of the book, found parallels between its central story and Mulder's ordeal and incorporated many of the novel's concepts into the episode. In The Last Temptation of Christ, Jesus is torn between his higher calling as the son of God and his desire towards his own humanity. Duchovny was drawn to the fact that Christ's struggle in the novel was "not only godlike, but also profoundly human" and used this template for Mulder; in the series, Mulder is destined towards greater things—in this case, stopping the oncoming alien invasion—but he also desires to have a normal, human life. Duchovny noted: "Mulder is a guy who's been given the same problem [as Jesus]. What I'm doing is using the very human model of Christ". Duchovny cautioned that he was not trying to make Mulder into a Christ-like savior figure but rather "an everyman". Executive producer Frank Spotnitz described the concept as a risk, but Duchovny felt that this exploration of Mulder's character was necessary.

Several of the lines in the episode proved difficult for both fans and cast members to embrace. Fans did not readily accept that The Smoking Man was Mulder's father. Davis, who portrayed The Smoking Man, noted that fans did not believe the revelation because "part of the mystique of it was that everybody had their own idea of what was going on." The dialogue in the episode proved difficult for Anderson to present believably. She was troubled that her character was arguing against the existence of extraterrestrials, when in the previous episode her character had encountered an alien shipwreck. When she talked to Carter, she said that she did not "know if [she could] do this anymore" because her character was arguing against information that had been confirmed in the first two parts of the episode. Carter explained that there must be conflict between Mulder and Scully for the show's "believer versus skeptic" dynamic to work properly.

The portions of the episode about the alien shard and Mulder's telepathic abilities allude to the ancient astronaut theory, which proposes that intelligent extraterrestrial beings visited Earth and made contact with humans in antiquity or prehistory. Spotnitz was surprised that the show received few complaints, even though the "Biogenesis"/"The Sixth Extinction"/"Amor Fati" story arc heavily suggested that aliens developed the notions of God and religion. He praised the manner in which the show handled this subject, saying, "Often in the past, we've done stuff where I was sure we would get angry letters. But we rarely do. And the reason is because of the way we handle things. In 'Amor Fati' we treated the religious side [of the story] with respect." Spotnitz later identified the combination of science and religion as "a conjunction of science and mysticism, of aliens and religion, that we're starting to develop. It's deliberate on our part, to help bring all the mythologies together into one story line." The ancient astronaut themes were revisited in two season nine episodes: "Provenance" and "Providence".

=== Casting and filming ===
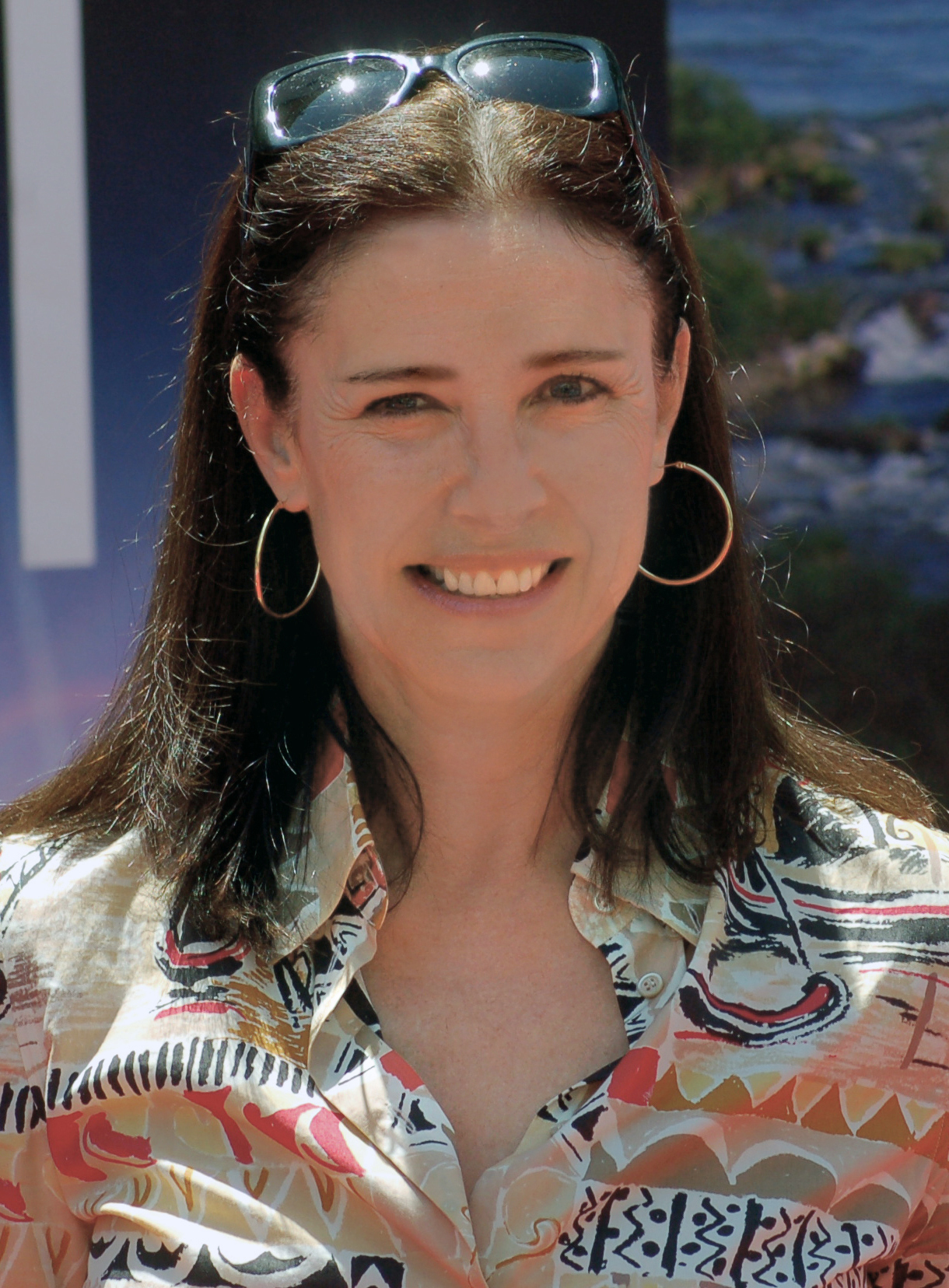
The episode is the last to feature Mimi Rogers.

"The Sixth Extinction II: Amor Fati" features a number of actors and actresses who had not appeared on the show for two or three years, including Hardin as Deep Throat, Rebecca Toolan as Teena Mulder, and Megan Leitch as Samantha Mulder. Hardin had last appeared in the fourth-season episode "Musings of a Cigarette Smoking Man" during a flashback sequence, and Toolan's most recent role was in the second installment of the sixth-season episode "Dreamland". Likewise, Leitch—who portrayed Samantha as an adult—had acted in the second part of the fifth-season opener "Redux". Casting director Rick Millikan and the producers encountered difficulties when casting the boy whom Mulder meets on the beach in his dream. Originally, they cast the child of series producer Paul Rabwin's neighbor, but child labor laws dictated a limit on his daily working hours, so twin boys were cast to allow the scenes to be shot in a single day.

"The Sixth Extinction II: Amor Fati" is the series' last episode to feature Mimi Rogers as Agent Fowley. After reading a copy of the script, Rogers realized that her character was going to die before she reached the ending. The script included a large part for Fowley, which Rogers described as "by far the most [she] had to do in an episode." She later explained, "It occurred to me [while I was reading the script], uh oh, this is way too good. I have too much to do. They're going to kill me."

Davis was pleased with the episode, and he stated: "For me the episode was terrific to play because they ended up making the Cigarette Smoking Man somewhat tougher. We have seen so much softness in him; it was great to play that tough side." With that said, he described the scene in which he was strapped to an operating table with Mulder as "totally uncomfortable", later joking that "the only upside of that was that the author [Duchovny] was lying right beside me, feeling equally uncomfortable. I wonder if David would have written it that way if he had known what he would have to go through."

The majority of the episode—like the rest of seasons six, seven, eight and nine—was filmed in Los Angeles, California. The housing community in Mulder's dream was filmed in an "affluent section" between Malibu and Pacific Palisades. The scene in which The Smoking Man opens a window, revealing an apocalyptic alien landscape, used a special set and a matte painting background. Various special effects, such as explosions, were filmed separately, and the pieces were digitally composited to create the final scene. A scene in which Mulder watched himself age was also filmed, but was cut for unknown reasons.

== Themes ==
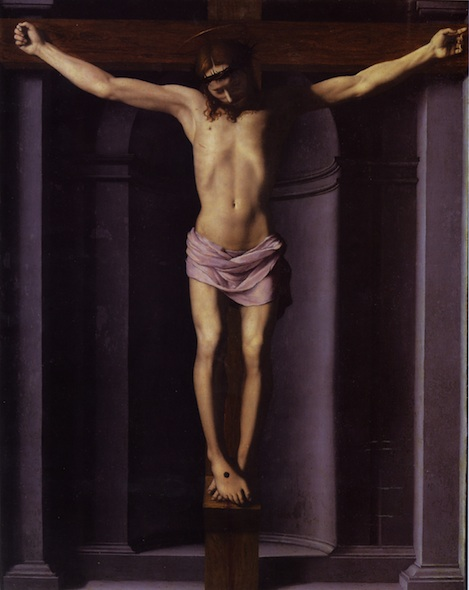
Fox Mulder's operation scene (left) has been compared to the Crucifixion of Jesus (right).

The episode portrays Mulder as a Christ-like figure. As scientists experiment on him, he is placed on a cross-like table, which has been interpreted to be symbolic of the cross to which Jesus was nailed. Mulder wears a metal ring around his head, similar to the biblical crown of thorns. Donaldson notes that The Smoking Man's advice to Mulder to save himself echoes what bystanders told Jesus as he hung from the cross. She draws parallels between Mulder's status as the "savior" of the human race—because of his immunity from the alien infection—and Jesus, whom Christians venerate as humanity's savior.

Donaldson, in her essay "The Last Temptation of Mulder", writes that in Kazantzakis' novel Jesus "represents what is the utmost human challenge, that of releasing the divinity within from its earthly confines." In this way, the Jesus of The Last Temptation of Christ represents "utter humanity" and the "struggle between the spirit and the flesh". Mulder is similarly challenged when he is enticed by The Smoking Man, and overcomes temptation by giving up his dream life and embracing his destiny to stop the alien invasion. Several characters in the episode resemble those in the novel. For instance, Fowley is similar to Kazantzakis's version of Mary Magdalene—both characters "[thwart] the mission" of the hero. Scully parallels Kazantzakis' version of Judas Iscariot, as they both call the heroes out of their respective trances.

According to McIlwain, the episode represents the series' ultimate "coalescence of science, religion, and metaphysics". It is one of the few episodes in which Scully eschews empirical reasoning to save Mulder's life. Scully, representing the more rational one "who must anchor herself in the certainty of scientific facts", discovers the alien shards and deduces that they hold the key to "every question that has ever been asked". Mulder, on the other hand, represents the one who "seeks the truth among a realm of possibilities too fantastic and beyond the realm of scientific validity" and possesses the needed tool—his immunity—to solve the puzzle. The episode also explores the moral side of The Smoking Man and his affinity for evil. Kenneth Silber of Space.com notes that The Smoking Man's "enticing blandishments confirm he is a highly dangerous foe, one whose Machiavellian creativity borders on the Satanic." Timothy Dunn and Joseph J. Foy note in "Moral Musings on a Cigarette Smoking Man" that The Smoking Man's evil deeds have little to do with his mission in the Syndicate, instead reflecting his desire for "completely gratuitous" evil. The two cite his line "Aren't you expecting me to sprout vampire fangs?" as evidence that The Smoking Man is aware of his crimes but casually shrugs them off.

== Broadcast and reception ==
"The Sixth Extinction II: Amor Fati" originally aired in the United States on the Fox network on November 14, 1999. In the U.S., the episode was watched by 16.15 million viewers and ranked as the 27th-most watched episode of any series on network TV for the week ending November 14. It earned a Nielsen household rating of 10.1, with a 14 share. Nielsen ratings are audience measurement systems that determine the audience size and composition of television programming in the U.S. This means that roughly 10.1 percent of all television-equipped households, and 14 percent of households watching television, were watching the episode. On May 13, 2003, the episode was released on DVD as part of the complete seventh season. Two years later, the episode was included on The X-Files Mythology, Volume 3 – Colonization, a DVD collection that contains episodes involving the alien colonists.

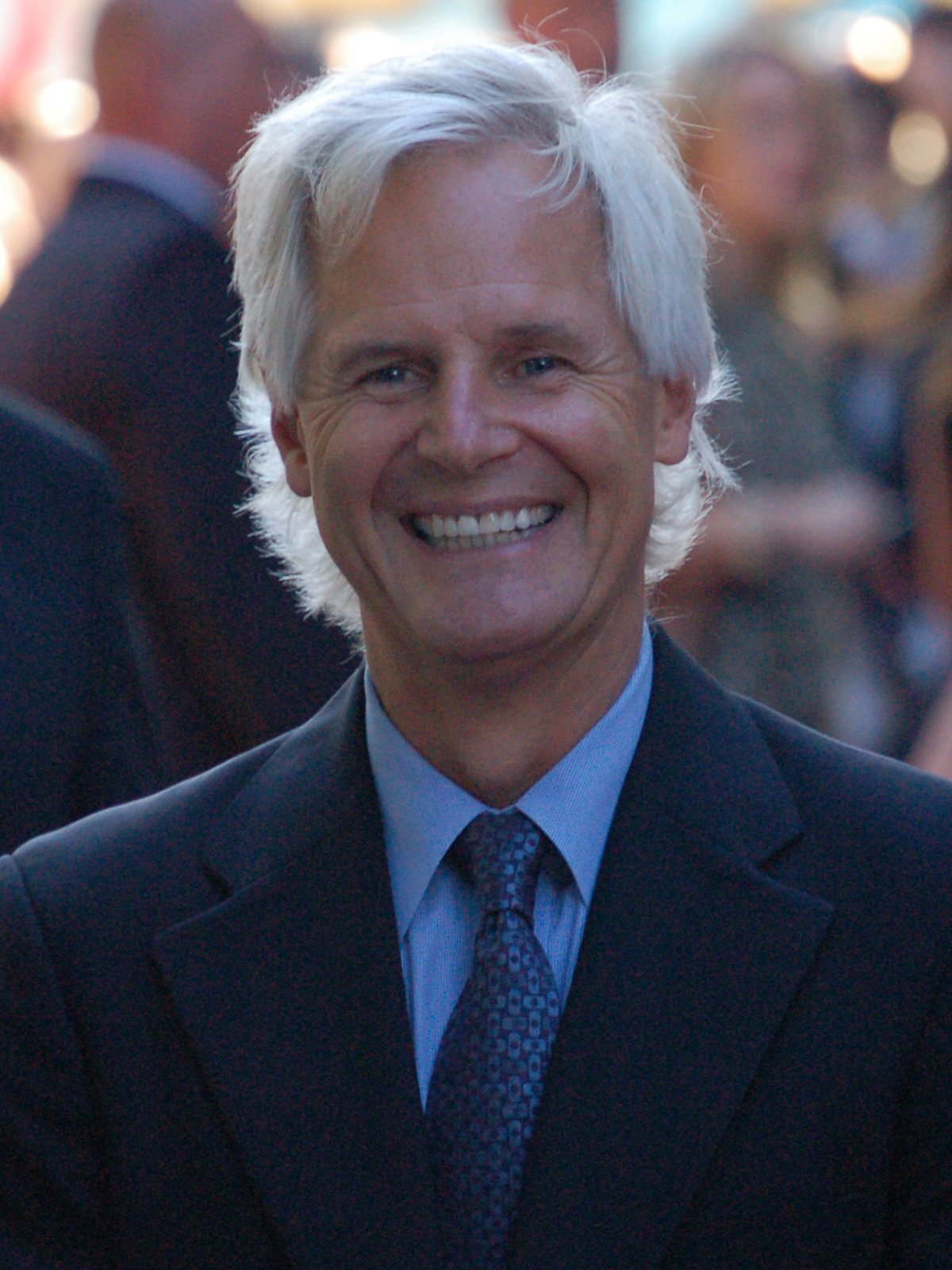
Elements of Chris Carter's writing were criticized for being too "purple".

Initial reviews of the episode were mixed. After the episode aired, Silber was disappointed in its resolution, writing, "This episode adeptly combines surrealism and a sense of impending climax—only to sputter out in disappointment when nothing much gets resolved at the end." He dismissed "Mulder's one-week recovery from his horrifying ordeal" as "facile and unconvincing". (Note: The ramifications of Mulder's illness and recovery from his brain injury would be explored in the eighth-season opening arc "Within" and "Without", as well as the mid-season entry "The Gift", in which it is revealed that Mulder's ordeal caused an inoperable brain disease.) He did write that Mulder's dream provided "credible insight into the recesses of his troubled personality". In the October 2000 issue of Cinefantastique, writer Paula Vitaris gave the episode a mixed review, awarding it two stars out of four. She criticized the recycling of the "one partner lies comatose while the other runs around trying to find a cure" storyline, but she was more positive towards Mulder's reverie, calling it visually "beautiful".

Later reviews of the episode tended to see the installment in a more positive light. Robert Shearman, in his 2009 book Wanting to Believe: A Critical Guide to The X-Files, Millennium & The Lone Gunmen, rated the episode four stars out of five, writing that it "kicks off the seventh season with great style" and become a "rallying cry for the last leg of the race". The author particularly enjoyed the episode's "real passion", which he felt was usually absent in the series' mythology-heavy episodes. In 2012, Emily St. James of The A.V. Club rated the episode a "B", but criticized the writing, calling it "very purple prose" and Carter's most "overwrought script since the glory days of 'The Blessing Way'." She was also critical of the "absolutely atrocious" make-up used to transform Duchovny into an old man. Notwithstanding her negativity towards the writing, plot, and make-up, St. James said that she truly "enjoy[ed] both halves of 'The Sixth Extinction' all the same" despite calling it "entertainingly bad [and] ludicrously over-the-top". She complimented the scene in which The Smoking Man looked out onto the alien apocalypse, deeming it a "pretty impressive TV effects accomplishment".

Since its original airing, critics have listed "The Sixth Extinction II: Amor Fati" among the best X-Files episodes. Den of Geek writer Nina Sordi named the installment—as a trilogy with "Biogenesis" and "The Sixth Extinction"—the fifth-best episode of the series, writing that, "it is evident that as [The X-Files] progressed, the episodes surrounding those storylines and the breaking points Mulder and Scully endured push them further and further towards total, irreversible defeat. This is especially poignant when viewing this anxiety inducing trio of episodes." Matt Champlin of The Post-Standard named the episode the ninth best of the series. Monica S. Kuebler of Exclaim! called "The Sixth Extinction", along with "Biogenesis" and "Amor Fati", one of the best episodes of the show's "colonization" phase. Michael Liedtke and George Avalos, writing for the Contra Costa Times, stated that the final scene with Mulder and Scully was one of the most "tender moments" in which they did not kiss. Entertainment Weekly named the same scene one of 25 "Great TV 'I Love You's'" [sic], declaring that it "left [viewers] with goosebumps".
