= Providence (The X-Files) =

- The X-Files episode
- Episode no.: Season 9 Episode 10
- Directed by: Chris Carter
- Written by: Chris Carter; Frank Spotnitz
- Production code: 9ABX11
- Original air date: March 10, 2002
- Running time: 44 minutes

Guest appearances
- James Pickens, Jr. as Alvin Kersh; Cary Elwes as Brad Follmer; Bruce Harwood as John Fitzgerald Byers; Tom Braidwood as Melvin Frohike; Dean Haglund as Richard Langly; Sheila Larken as Margaret Scully; Neal McDonough as Motorcycle Man/Comer; McNally Sagal as Overcoat Woman; Denis Forest as Josepho; Alan Dale as Toothpick Man; Kerrie Keane as Nurse; Jamie McShane as Injured Soldier; Brian Morri as Soldier #1; Christian Hastings as Soldier #2; Brad Kalas as Cult Man; Kevin McCorkle as Cult Man #2; James Riker as Baby William; Travis Riker as Baby William

Episode chronology
← Previous "Provenance"	Next → "Audrey Pauley"
- The X-Files season 9

"Providence" is the tenth episode of the ninth season of the American science fiction television series The X-Files. It premiered on the Fox network on March 10, 2002, and later aired in the United Kingdom on BBC One on January 19, 2003. The episode was written by series creator Chris Carter and executive producer Frank Spotnitz, and directed by Carter. "Providence" helps to explore the series' overarching mythology. The episode earned a Nielsen household rating of 5.2 and was viewed by 8.4 million viewers. The episode received mixed reviews from critics; some reviewers enjoyed the story and the show's way of integrating an absent Fox Mulder (David Duchovny) into the storyline, whereas others felt the plot was ludicrous.

The show centers on FBI special agents who work on cases linked to the paranormal, called X-Files; this season focuses on the investigations of John Doggett (Robert Patrick), Monica Reyes (Annabeth Gish), and Dana Scully (Gillian Anderson). In this episode, Scully, distrustful of both Walter Skinner (Mitch Pileggi) and Brad Follmer (Cary Elwes), circumvents the FBI's investigation into William's kidnapping and performs her own, assisted by Reyes and The Lone Gunmen. Scully discovers that William has been taken by a UFO cult that believes William is destined to become the savior of mankind, but only if Fox Mulder is still alive. If Mulder is dead, William will lead the forces of evil: the alien invaders.

Co-written and directed by Carter, the episode opens with a shot of a fire fight during the Gulf War and the Super Soldiers' involvement therein. Many of the cast and crew were pleased with Carter's directing, including Anderson and Gish. The episode makes reference to rubbings from an alien wreck, a direct continuation from the plots of the sixth season finale "Biogenesis" and the seventh season opener "The Sixth Extinction".

== Plot ==
Retired Lieutenant Colonel Zeke Josepho recounts a strange experience during the Persian Gulf War and how he claims it brought him to God: as his squad was ambushed during the Battle of Al Busayyah and on the verge of defeat, four mysterious men showed up and defeated the enemy with astonishing ease. While Josepho thinks of them as guardian angels, they are revealed to be the almost-indestructible Super Soldiers. In the present, Josepho stands above the wreckage of a spacecraft in Canada.

At the FBI, Brad Follmer (Cary Elwes) discloses to a room of agents that Dana Scully’s (Gillian Anderson) son William has been abducted. Follmer notes that The Lone Gunmen are identifying the woman who took the child and ran over John Doggett (Robert Patrick). However, Follmer leaves out any potential motive for these crimes, which causes a frustrated Scully to leave the room. Byers (Bruce Harwood) reveals that he put a cell phone in the baby's belongings so they can track the Overcoat Woman; Monica Reyes (Annabeth Gish) and Scully head out to find William. The two eventually find William's car seat along with the cell phone in an abandoned SUV. Meanwhile, the Overcoat Woman reports to Josepho that she has William.

Scully meets Agent Robert Comer, whom she was forced to shoot after his attempt on William's life, and uses the alien artifact to heal him. Comer explains that Josepho believes a physical manifestation of God exists inside the spacecraft. According to an ancient prophecy, William is destined to become the savior of humanity, but only if Fox Mulder (David Duchovny) is still alive. If he dies, William will instead lead the Colonists. Comer claims that Mulder was supposedly killed by the cult in order for the aliens to successfully invade; he tried to kill William to prevent him from causing humanity's destruction. Suddenly, a nurse and the Toothpick Man (Alan Dale) arrive and ask Reyes and Scully to leave. Comer ends up alone with the Toothpick Man.

Walter Skinner (Mitch Pileggi) later reports to Reyes and Scully that Comer has died. Reyes accuses Toothpick Man and others in the room of killing Comer. Meanwhile, Scully visits Doggett, who warns her not to trust the cultists. However, Scully goes to meet Josepho near Calgary. Josepho claims to be protecting William, but demands Mulder's head as collateral in exchange for the baby's release. When Josepho returns to the wreck site, the Overcoat Woman relates that the aperture of the craft began to glow when William started crying. The craft soon rises up out of the ground. Looking on the site from a distance, Scully and Reyes see the craft burst out of an enclosure and into space, lighting the ground beneath it on fire as it goes. The two find an unharmed William among the charred bodies of the cultists.

At FBI headquarters, Follmer asks Kersh to remove his name from the final report. Instead, Kersh rebukes him and goes in to see the Toothpick Man, who is revealed to be a Super Soldier.

== Production ==
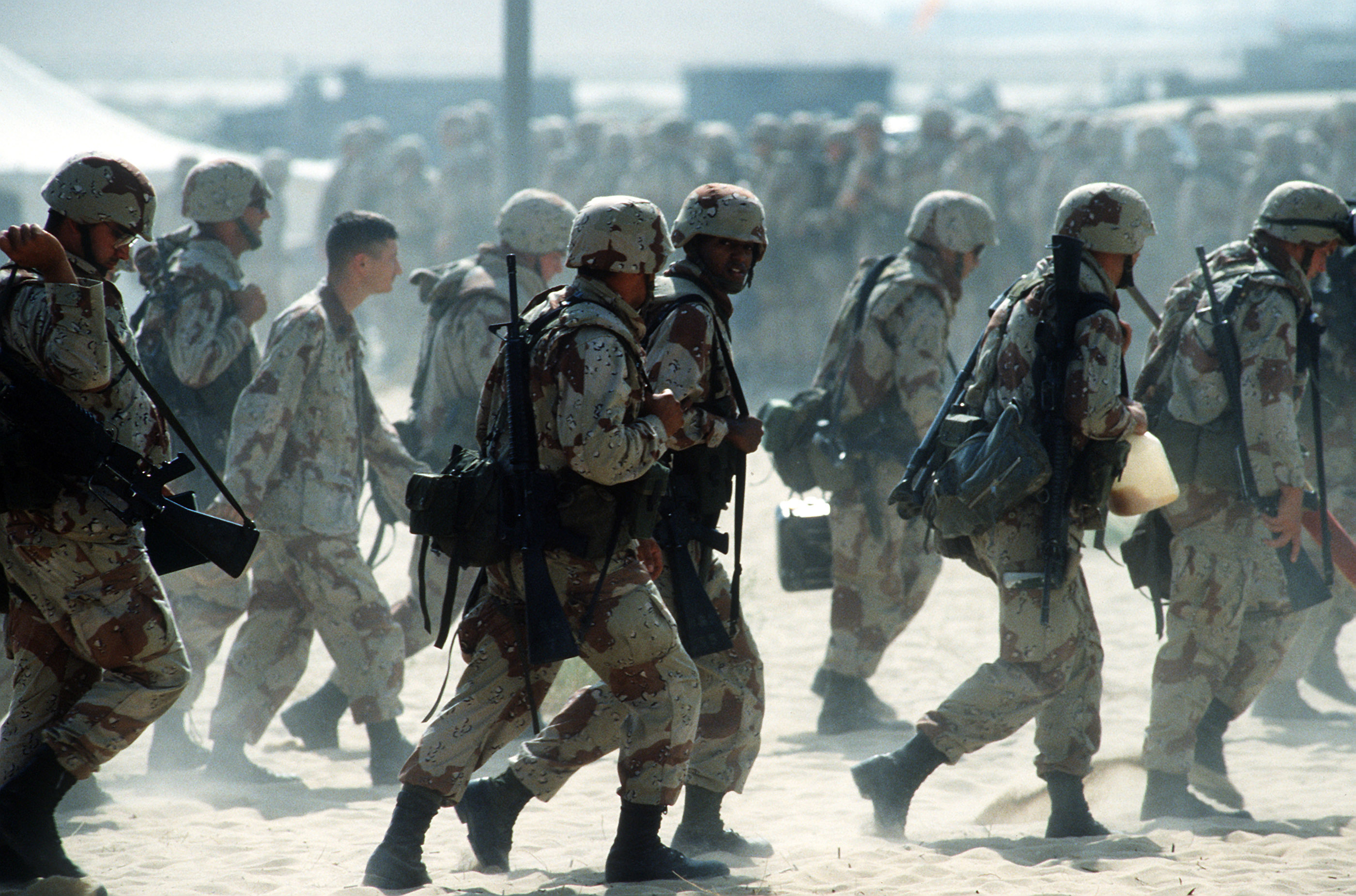
The opening scene depicts a fire fight during the Gulf War. A desert area one hour outside of Los Angeles stood in for Iraq, and the scene featured actual U.S. military personnel as extras (U.S. Marines in the Gulf War pictured).

"Providence" was written by series creator Chris Carter and executive producer Frank Spotnitz. A large portion of the episode, as well as the previous entry, was based on the ancient astronaut theory; a theory that proposes intelligent extraterrestrial beings have visited Earth in antiquity or prehistory and made contact with humans. The themes had previously been visited in the "Biogenesis"/"The Sixth Extinction"/"Amor Fati" story arc. This episode, as well as the one that proceeds it, plays around with questions concerning traditional religion and faith. About the plot, series co-star Robert Patrick later joked: "The baby's the Messiah. I don't understand any of it. I'm Episcopalian; I don't get it."

Carter also directed the episode; initially, the episode was supposed to have been helmed by another individual, but no one was ever selected. At the last minute, Carter took on the role. Due to time constraints, Carter was writing whole parts of the script while the episode was being filmed. Many of the cast and crew were pleased with Carter's directing. Gillian Anderson said that she thought "Chris has directed some of our best episodes. He's very even tempered, and he's quiet and gentle and quite nice to have as a director, because that energy can't help but pervade the rest of the set […] He's got a clear vision, and he's good at communicating that." Annabeth Gish noted that Carter's directing was "very meticulous" and that he "knows exactly what he wants".

The episode's opening scene depicts a firefight during the Gulf War. This sequence, which took two days to film, was shot on a dry expanse of land located an hour outside of Los Angeles. This area had been selected due to its resemblance to an Iraqi desert. Series' co-executive producer Michelle MacLaren said: "We [MacLaren and location manager Ilt Jones] were way out in the desert and we drove around this corner of these hills and I felt like we had entered another country. It was so desolate, and there were these stone buildings that looked like a bomb had gone off in them. It was perfect." To add authenticity to the shoot, several of the extras used during this scene were former U.S. military personnel.

Unlike many of the sets featured on the show, which were filmed on a Fox soundstage, the shot of the buried alien space craft was actually filmed in the hills near Simi Valley, California. Carter wanted a full-scale mock-up of the alien ship to be buried in the ground. This was unusual for the show; usually, a small portion of the ship would have been buried in the ground and the rest would have been filled in either via digital graphics, or with a scale model. In this episode, however, all the shots of the alien ship, sans the takeoff, were done practically. To create the otherworldly glow of the ship, over 100 lamps were hidden within the craft. The ship was also covered in fictional characters that had been programmed into a computer, printed off as stickers, and then applied to the ship's hull.

== Broadcast and reception ==
=== Ratings ===
"Providence" first premiered on the Fox network in the United States on March 10, 2002. The episode earned a Nielsen household rating of 5.2, meaning that it was seen by 5.2% of the nation's estimated households and was viewed by 5.49 million households, (Note: At the time of airing, the estimated number of households was 105.5 million. Thus, 5.2 percent of 105.5 million is 5.49 million households.) and 8.4 million viewers. "Providence" was the 56th most watched episode of television that aired during the week ending March 10. The episode eventually aired on BBC Two on January 19, 2003. "Providence" was later included on The X-Files Mythology, Volume 4 – Super Soldiers, a DVD collection that contains episodes involved with the alien super soldiers arc.

=== Reviews ===
"Providence" received mixed reviews from television critics. Jessica Morgan from Television Without Pity awarded the episode a B+ rating. Jeffrey Robinson from DVD Talk concluded that "Providence", along with the previous episode "Provenance", "does a fairly good job without including Duchovny" due to its adherence to "the series' main storyline [about] the government conspiracies." Robert Shearman and Lars Pearson, in their book Wanting to Believe: A Critical Guide to The X-Files, Millennium & The Lone Gunmen, rated the episode one star out of five. They called the entry "shallow and pretentious, and internally inconsistent" and derided its plot. They wrote that "at the centre of [the show's] mythology [is] a situation dependent on Mulder and a baby. One of them is absent, and one of them can't talk." Furthermore, Shearman and Pearson criticized the line asking for Mulder's head, but praised the episode's teaser. M.A. Crang, in his book Denying the Truth: Revisiting The X-Files after 9/11, also complimented the teaser sequence, calling it "glorious", but was heavily critical of the rest of the episode's "confused and impenetrable" story. Tom Kessenich, in his book Examinations, wrote a largely negative review of the episode and derided its plot. He wrote that "as this series winds down, you would think Carter and Spotnitz would be in a hurry to resolve some of the myriad of questions they've posed. Instead, 'Providence' was just more of what we've come to expect the past two seasons."

== Bibliography ==
- Hurwitz, Matt; Knowles, Chris (2008). The Complete X-Files. Insight Editions. ISBN 978-1933784809.
- Kessenich, Tom (2002). Examination: An Unauthorized Look at Seasons 6–9 of the X-Files. Trafford Publishing. ISBN 1553698126.
- Shearman, Robert; Pearson, Lars (2009). Wanting to Believe: A Critical Guide to The X-Files, Millennium & The Lone Gunmen. Mad Norwegian Press. ISBN 978-0975944691.

This article incorporates material derived from the "Providence" article on the X-Files wiki at Fandom (formerly Wikia) and is licensed under the Creative Commons Attribution-Share Alike 3.0 License (July 14, 2012).
