= Biogenesis (The X-Files) =

- The X-Files episode
- An alien shipwreck on the beach in Côte d'Ivoire. The episode questioned whether or not aliens were involved in past great extinctions, the creation of religion, and the development of the human race.
- Episode no.: Season 6 Episode 22
- Directed by: Rob Bowman
- Written by: Chris Carter; Frank Spotnitz
- Production code: 6ABX22
- Original air date: May 16, 1999
- Running time: 45 minutes

Guest appearances
- Mitch Pileggi as Walter Skinner; Nicholas Lea as Alex Krycek; Mimi Rogers as Diana Fowley; William B. Davis as Cigarette Smoking Man; Michael Chinyamurindi as Dr. Merkmallen; Murray Rubinstein as Dr. Sandoz; Michael Ensign as Dr. Barnes; Floyd Westerman as Albert Hosteen; Bill Dow as Charles Burks; Chef Grissom as Detective; Sheila Tousey as Native American Nurse; Warren Sweeney as Geoff Harriman; Samuel Kwaku Minta as Yelling Man; Ayo Adeyemi as African Man; Benjamin Ochieng as Second African Man; Marty Zagon as Landlord

Episode chronology
← Previous "Field Trip"	Next → "The Sixth Extinction"

"Biogenesis" is the twenty-second episode and the sixth season finale of the science fiction television series The X-Files. The episode first aired in the United States and Canada on May 16, 1999, on the Fox Network, and aired in the United Kingdom and Ireland on July 25, 1999, on Sky1. It was written by executive producers Chris Carter and Frank Spotnitz, and directed by Rob Bowman. "Biogenesis" earned a Nielsen household rating of 9.4, being watched by 15.86 million people in its initial broadcast. The episode received mixed reviews from critics.

The show centers on FBI special agents Fox Mulder (David Duchovny) and Dana Scully (Gillian Anderson) who work on cases linked to the paranormal, called X-Files. Mulder is a believer in the paranormal, while the skeptical Scully has been assigned to debunk his work. In the episode, Mulder and Scully investigate a bizarre rock inscribed with Navajo writing found in Côte d'Ivoire, and the death of the African scientist involved. The investigation leads them to the beaches of Côte d'Ivoire, where an alien spacecraft is found, buried in the sand.

"Biogenesis" was a story milestone for the series, along with "The Sixth Extinction" and "The Sixth Extinction II: Amor Fati," and introduced new aspects to the series' overarching mythology. The episode was written due to series creator Chris Carter's fascination with the possibility that extraterrestrials were involved in the great extinctions that had happened millions of years ago.

== Plot ==
On a beach in Côte d'Ivoire, biology professor Solomon Merkmallen discovers a metallic artifact covered in inscriptions. When he places it with a similar artifact, the two fuse together and embed themselves in a nearby Bible. Merkmallen travels to the U.S. to meet biologist Steven Sandoz, who possesses a third artifact. Merkmallen, however, is murdered by a man posing as Sandoz named Dr. Barnes. When the real Sandoz subsequently discovers the body, he flees.

Assistant Director Walter Skinner (Mitch Pileggi) assigns Fox Mulder (David Duchovny) and Dana Scully (Gillian Anderson) to investigate. Mulder explains that Merkmallen and Sandoz supported panspermia, which is the theory that Earthly life has extraterrestrial origins. Skinner gives the agents a rubbing of the artifact, which Mulder's ally Charles Burks analyzes and determines contains inscriptions in Navajo. After examining the rubbing, Mulder begins suffering increasingly severe headaches and apparent telepathic abilities, through which he realizes that Barnes murdered Merkmallen.

At Sandoz's apartment, the agents find Merkmallen's dismembered body and a photograph connecting Sandoz to Albert Hosteen, a former Navajo code talker. Mulder concludes that Sandoz is being framed and that the artifact is emitting some form of radiation. Scully subsequently travels to New Mexico, where she finds Hosteen dying of cancer and encounters Sandoz. The latter explains that Hosteen was helping translate the artifacts' Navajo inscriptions, which include passages from the Bible. Meanwhile, Mulder tries to trail Barnes, but when his condition worsens, he collapses and is hospitalized with abnormal brain activity.

Mulder concludes that the artifact may prove humanity was created by aliens. Diana Fowley (Mimi Rogers), who has been with him, secretly contacts the Smoking Man (William B. Davis). Meanwhile, Sandoz calls Scully and tells her that the artifact also contains information about human genetics, but Alex Krycek (Nicholas Lea) kills him shortly thereafter. Scully then travels to the shore of Côte d'Ivoire and discovers that the artifact is actually part of a crashed alien ship, the wreck of which has been partially uncovered.

== Production ==
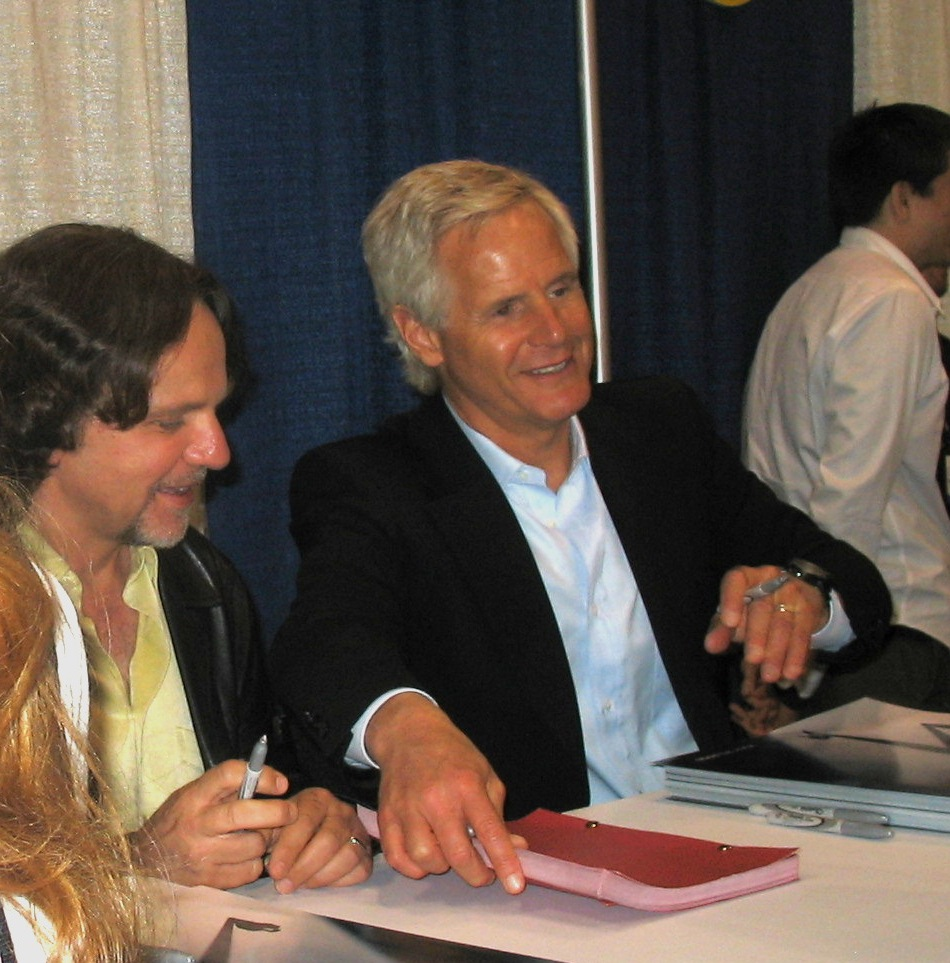
Series creator Chris Carter (right) with executive producer Frank Spotnitz (left), the writers of "Biogenesis."

"Biogenesis" started a new branch of the show's mythology, questioning the origin of human life. Series creator Chris Carter, who had been interested in the possibility of extraterrestrial involvement in great extinctions that had happened millions of years ago, claimed that early in the show he had met with a man who was one of the people responsible for leading the project of mapping the human genome, which interested him enough to tie it into the show's alien mythology. The scientific basis for extraterrestrials was an attempt by the writers to have Mulder and Scully's divergent beliefs come together, which was furthered in the later seasons of the show. Frank Spotnitz claimed that the ideas used in this episode had been discussed between him and Carter for a few years and had become easier to bring up after wrapping up much of the conspiracy in the sixth-season episodes "Two Fathers" and "One Son". Carter eventually developed the script in Vancouver, British Columbia, Canada while working on the pilot for his series Harsh Realm and sent copies to the production crew via fax.

Professor Solomon Merkmallen was played by Michael Chinyamurindi, who had immigrated to the United States ten years prior and had previously auditioned for the fourth-season episode "Teliko" in season four. A number of African immigrants were used to play the fishermen that Scully meets along the African coast. Chinyamurindi’s Anglophone accent and the subtitles stating that the characters in the opening scenes are speaking Swahili is a significant error: The Ivory Coast, a Francophone country, is on the other side of the African continent from both Swahili speakers and Chinyamurindi’s Zimbabwean accent. The University scenes were shot at UCLA, whereas the African coastline scenes were filmed at Leo Carrillo State Park. Weather conditions meant that the crew only had approximately 45 minutes per day to film at the latter location. The spacecraft was created digitally and the effect ended up costing approximately $150,000. The extraterrestrial writing on the artifacts was based on the 1965 Kecksburg UFO Incident, when local residents found a large object in the woods shaped like an acorn bearing writing resembling Egyptian hieroglyphs. Hosteen Etsity, who previously assisted with the episode "The Blessing Way", oversaw the use and implementation of Navajo symbols in this episode.

A large portion of the episode was based on the ancient astronaut theory, which proposes that intelligent extraterrestrial beings have visited Earth in antiquity or prehistory and made contact with humans. Frank Spotnitz later remarked that he was astounded at how little negative fan mail the show received, despite the fact that the "Biogenesis"/"The Sixth Extinction"/"Amor Fati" story arc heavily hinted that aliens were the originators of the notion of God and religion. He credited the manner in which the show handled this delicate subject, saying, "Often in the past, we've done stuff where I was sure we would get angry letters. But we rarely do. And the reason is because of the way we handle things. In 'Amor Fati' we treated the religious side with respect." The ancient astronaut themes were later revisited in the two season nine episodes "Provenance" and "Providence."

== Reception ==
"Biogenesis" first aired in the United States on May 16, 1999. This episode earned a Nielsen rating of 9.4, with a 14 share, meaning that roughly 9.4 percent of all television-equipped households, and 14 percent of households watching television, were tuned in to the episode. It was viewed by 15.86 million viewers. The episode aired in the United Kingdom on Sky1 on July 25, 1999, and received 0.55 million viewers and was the eighth most watched episode that week. The episode was later included on The X-Files Mythology, Volume 3 – Colonization, a DVD collection that contains episodes involved with the alien Colonist's plans to take over the earth.

Tom Kessenich, in his book Examination: An Unauthorized Look at Seasons 6–9 of the X-Files gave the episode a positive review, writing "'Biogenesis' gave us a Mulder gone mad, duplicitous allies and enemies, a rising body count, and Scully on the brink of an amazing discovery. It was pure X-Files and a terrific conclusion to a standout sixth season." Den of Geek writer Nina Sordi ranked "Biogenesis," along with "The Sixth Extinction" and "The Sixth Extinction II: Amor Fati," as the fifth best episode of the series, writing, "it is evident that as [The X-Files] progressed, the episodes surrounding those storylines and the breaking points Mulder and Scully endured push them further and further towards total, irreversible defeat. This is especially poignant when viewing this anxiety inducing trio of episodes." Monica S. Kuebler from Exclaim magazine called "Biogenesis", along with "The Sixth Extinction" and "Amor Fati", one of the "best" episodes during the show's "colonization" phase. Michigan Daily reviewer Melissa Runstrom said "Biogenesis," along with "One Son" and "Two Fathers," were the highlights of the sixth season.

Zack Handlen awarded the episode a "B" and called it "crazy enough at the end that, if nothing else, I really want to know what happens next". He enjoyed the basic premise, involving the idea that aliens were active in the development of humanity—comparing it to Stanley Kubrick’s film 2001: A Space Odyssey and Ridley Scott’s movie Prometheus. However, Handlen, since he was reviewing the series retrospectively, was slightly disappointed that the plot was dropped in subsequent season. In the end, he noted that the entry was "ambitious, but it doesn’t exactly make sense, which is pretty much where [The X-Files' mythology] is at now."

Other reviews were more critical. Robert Shearman, in his book Wanting to Believe: A Critical Guide to The X-Files, Millennium & The Lone Gunmen, rated the episode two stars out of five. Shearman heavily criticized the episode for recycling story lines, writing, "With the Syndicate destroyed, this episode was widely touted as the beginning of a fresh new mythology for the show. So why does watching it give such a strong sense of déjà vu?" Paula Vitaris from Cinefantastique gave the episode a largely negative review and awarded it one-and-a-half stars out of four. Vitaris summarized the episode as "if someone took the script to 'Anasazi'—one of the best X-Files episodes ever—changed the plot a bit, and then stripped it of virtually all human interest."

== Bibliography ==
- Hurwitz, Matt; Chris Knowles (2008). The Complete X-Files. Insight Editions. ISBN 978-1-933784-72-4.
- Kessenich, Tom (2002). Examination: An Unauthorized Look at Seasons 6–9 of the X-Files. Trafford Publishing. ISBN 1-55369-812-6.
- Meisler, Andy (2000). The End and the Beginning: The Official Guide to the X-Files Season 6. HarperCollins. ISBN 0-06-107595-7.
- Shapiro, Marc (2000). All Things: The Official Guide to the X-Files Volume 6. Harper Prism. ISBN 0-06-107611-2.
- Shearman, Robert (2009). Wanting to Believe: A Critical Guide to The X-Files, Millennium & The Lone Gunmen. Mad Norwegian Press. ISBN 978-0-9759446-9-1.
