= Denis Forest =

Canadian actor (1960–2002)

- Born: September 5, 1960; Ottawa, Ontario, Canada
- Died: March 18, 2002 (aged 41); Los Angeles, California, U.S.
- Occupation: Actor
- Years active: 1982–2002

Denis Forest (September 5, 1960 – March 18, 2002) was a Canadian character actor. He was known for portraying henchmen in Academy Award-nominated blockbusters The Mask and Cliffhanger. He was the lead villain in the second season of the War of the Worlds television series.

== Early life and education ==
A graduate of the Ryerson Theatre School, he was an early founding member of Richard Rose and Thom Sokoloski's Autumn Angel Repertory theatre company.

== Career ==
In 1986 Forest and Bruce Verine premiered Projekt Putz, a satirical send-up of avant-garde performance art, at the Toronto Free Theatre. He also had occasional film and television roles in this era, including the television miniseries Race for the Bomb and Champagne Charlie.

After the 1989 film The Long Road Home, he moved to Los Angeles to pursue work in American film and television.

== Award nominations ==
Forest received a Dora Mavor Moore Award nomination for Best Original Play, General Theatre at the 1984 Dora Mavor Moore Awards for the collective play Mein.

== Death ==
Forest died suddenly following a massive stroke in Los Angeles on March 18, 2002, after having dinner in a Franklin Avenue restaurant in Hollywood with a few friends.

== Filmography ==
=== Film ===
- The Adventures of Bob & Doug McKenzie: Strange Brew (1983) - Policeman
- Head Office (1985) - Rich
- The Climb (1986) - Hermann Kollensperger
- Tadpole and the Whale (1988) - Marcel
- Lonely Child: The Imaginary World of Claude Vivier (1988) - Claude Vivier, age 26
- Destiny to Order (1989) - Chicout
- The Long Road Home (1989) - Michael Posen
- Wedlock (1991) - Puce
- Cliffhanger (1993) - Heldon
- The Mask (1994) - Sweet Eddy
- New Crime City (1994) - Wizard
- Where Truth Lies (1996) - Jonas Kellar
- Eraser (1996) - Technician
- Dead Men Can't Dance (1997) - Dennis Larson
- Hidden Agenda (1999) - Christoph
- Detonator (2003) - Steve Kerwin (final film role)

=== Television ===
Denis Forest television credits
Year	Title	Role	Notes
1987	Race for the Bomb	Klaus Fuchs	TV miniseries
1987-1990	Friday the 13th: The Series	(various)	4 episodes
1989	War of the Worlds	Martin Cole	1 episode
1989-1990	War of the Worlds	Malzor	Season 2. 20 episodes
1989	Champagne Charlie	Paul Lampin	TV miniseries
1990	Counterstrike	Carter	Episode: "A Little Purity"
1990-1991	Dracula: The Series	Nosferatu	
1998	La Femme Nikita	Rene Dian	
1999	Storm of the Century	Kirk Freeman	
2002	The X-Files	Zeke Josepho	Episode: "Providence" (S9.E10)
