= Frank Spotnitz =

American television writer and producer (b. 1960)

- Born: 1960 (age 65–66); Camp Zama, Kanagawa Prefecture, Japan
- Education: UCLA (BA); American Film Institute (MFA)
- Occupations: Screenwriter, producer
- Known for: The X-Files; The Man in the High Castle
- Website: frankspotnitz.com

Frank Charles Spotnitz (born 1960) is an American television writer and producer. He is best known for his work on the series The X-Files (1995–2002) and its spin-off The Lone Gunmen (2001), and as the developer/creator of The Man in the High Castle (2015–2019), Medici (2016–19), Ransom (2017–19), and Leonardo (2021)

Spotnitz is also the chief executive officer and founder of Big Light Productions, a London- and Paris-based production company, which specializes in international television series, including drama, comedy and documentaries. Spotnitz's career includes creating, writing and producing series with networks, cable, streaming and other broadcast platforms around the world.

Sponitz has been nominated for three Primetime Emmy Awards for his work on The X-Files, and won a Canadian Screen Award for creating the CTV comedy-drama series The Indian Detective.

== Early life ==
Born in Camp Zama, Japan. Spotnitz's father is Jewish, though Spotnitz was not raised religiously. Spotnitz's father was a doctor in the US Army. His family moved around until they settled in Phoenix, Arizona. As a child, Spotnitz consumed television shows and films as much as he could, sometimes watching the same film two or three times in a row. Spotnitz attended Camelback High School, where he was inspired to pursue a career in Hollywood.

Spotnitz graduated from the University of California, Los Angeles (UCLA) with a bachelor's degree in English literature in 1982, where he was a reporter for the Daily Bruin. He later received a MFA in screenwriting from the AFI Conservatory in 1991.

== Career ==
=== Journalism ===
Upon graduation from UCLA, Spotnitz was employed as a wire-service reporter for the United Press International in Indianapolis and New York. He also briefly worked for the Associated Press in Paris. Spotnitz freelanced for Entertainment Weekly and Rolling Stone before returning to his passion and studying screenwriting at AFI.

=== Television ===
Spotnitz's first television role was on The-X-Files, which he described as being "like a second film school." His writing and producing credits include: counter-terrorism drama series Strike Back (HBO/Cinemax, Sky); action series Transporter: The Series (TNT); ABC's mystery series Night Stalker (ABC), starring Stuart Townsend and Gabrielle Union; Michael Mann's crime series Robbery Homicide Division (CBS); unconventional heroes comedy-drama The Lone Gunmen (Fox); sci-fi drama Harsh Realm (Fox); and crime thriller Millennium (Fox).

==== The X-Files ====
Spotnitz served on The X-Files for eight of its nine seasons after joining the show in 1994. He called it "a life-changing experience", graduating from staff writer to executive producer after three seasons. He directed two episodes and wrote or co-wrote more than 40 instalments of the series, including the Emmy-nominated "Memento Mori" with Chris Carter, Vince Gilligan and John Shiban in 1997. He served for four years as executive producer and three years as president of Carter's Ten Thirteen Productions. He was a producer and co-writer of both The X-Files feature films, Fight the Future (1998) and I Want to Believe (2008). Spotnitz shares three Golden Globes for Best Dramatic Series and a Peabody Award for his work on The X-Files. He was also nominated for an Emmy Award for writing and three times for Outstanding Drama Series.

==== Hunted ====
In 2012, Spotnitz created, wrote and executive-produced the international spy drama series Hunted for BBC1 and HBO/Cinemax, starring Melissa George, Adam Rayner, Stephen Dillane and Patrick Malahide. The series follows Sam Hunter, an operative for a private spy agency, Byzantium. After she is betrayed and nearly killed by one of her colleagues, Sam returns to London in an attempt to root out the traitor, while working undercover in the home of a wealthy and dangerous London gangster on an assignment that could cost her life. The series was BAFTA nominated for cinematography and won the ASC Award. It was also nominated for Best Editing by the Royal Television Society.

==== The Man in the High Castle ====
Spotnitz created, executive-produced and wrote several episodes of The Man in the High Castle, based on the classic alternative history novel by Philip K. Dick, which upon its release became Amazon's most viewed series ever. Starring Alexa Davalos, Rufus Sewell and Joel de la Fuente, the series explores life in a 1962 America after the Allies lost the war and the country is divided between the fascist Japanese in the West and the Nazis in the East. The series won two Emmy Awards, was nominated for two others, and named Best Drama Series at the Roma Fiction Festival. It was also nominated for an ASC Award for Outstanding Cinematography, the USC Scripter Award and Best Drama at Monte Carlo Television Festival's Golden Nymph Awards.

==== Medici ====
Spotnitz co-created, executive-produced and co-wrote Medici: Masters of Florence, starring Richard Madden, Dustin Hoffman and Annabel Scholey. Chronicling the rise of the Medici family during the Italian Renaissance, it shows how the family's ascent from simple merchants to power brokers sparked an economic and cultural revolution, creating powerful enemies in the process. The Netflix Original Series was produced with Lux Vide Productions for RAI, Italy's largest broadcaster, and SFR in France. The RAI premiere attracted a record-breaking seven million viewers in Italy, becoming the country's most-watched new series.

Set 20 years later, Medici: The Magnificent starred Daniel Sharman, Bradley James and Sean Bean, and was also co-created, executive-produced and co-written by Spotnitz. After an attempt on Piero de Medici's life, his son Lorenzo is forced to assume leadership of the family-run bank. Once in power, young Lorenzo resolves to abandon the cynical politics of the past to usher in a new era of creative and political revolution, bringing him into open conflict with rival banker Jacopo Pazzi, who will stop at nothing to defeat him. Their clash gives rise to one of the most thrilling true-life political intrigues of all time, the infamous Pazzi conspiracy. The second season of Medici: The Magnificent was broadcast on RAI in December 2019 and premieres as a Netflix Original Series in May 2020.

==== The Indian Detective ====
In 2017, Spotnitz co-created, executive-produced and co-wrote the comedy-drama series The Indian Detective for Canadian broadcaster CTV and Netflix. It starred international comedy sensation Russell Peters, whom Forbes magazine ranked three times in its Top 10 highest-grossing comics list. Peters portrays Doug D'Mello, a charming, smart Toronto cop, who unexpectedly finds himself investigating murder in his parents' Indian homeland, where, despite his heritage, he remains an outsider. Canada's biggest series debut in two years was the second-most watched programme on the day of its CTV premiere, with 1.6 million viewers. It was bestowed the Golden Screen Award by the Canadian Screen Academy.

==== Ransom ====
Ransom, produced for CBS in the US, France's TF1, Canada's Corus/Global and RTL in Germany, was a suspense drama set against an international backdrop. It starred Luke Roberts and was co-created, executive-produced and co-written by Spotnitz. The thriller follows crisis and hostage negotiator Eric Beaumont, whose team is brought in to save lives when no one else can. Beaumont understands criminals better than they understand themselves and uses his insight into human behaviour to resolve the most difficult kidnap and ransom cases. Despite the stakes, Beaumont refuses to resort to violence, even when confronted by some of the world's most dangerous criminals. Ransom was VOX Germany's highest rated drama premiere for over 15 months and France's TF1 premiere reached over 4 million viewers for a market share of 25%. The show ran for three seasons.

==== Leonardo ====
Spotnitz produced Leonardo. Among the first TV shows completed during the COVID-19 pandemic in Italy, the show was a dramatization of what Leonardo da Vinci's life might have been like. The series was released in early 2021 in RAI for Italy, Amazon Prime for the United Kingdom and Ireland, as well as Sony LIV in India, and PikTV in Canada. This eight-part series was a depiction of personal sacrifice, leading Da Vinci on a pathway that changed the world. Two of the main characters were portrayed by Aidan Turner and Freddie Highmore. Additionally it was produced by The Alliance (RAI, France Télévisions, ZDF and RTVE).

==== Devils ====
Spotnitz worked as a consulting producer on the financial drama Devils. He took over writing and executive producing for its second season in 2022.

== Writing process ==
Spotnitz adopted the writers' room process from his experience in the US, which he brought to the UK when he founded Big Light Productions. He cards the story scene by scene on a corkboard, with one board for each episode. Spotnitz favours carding in order to better analyse the story and to enable better collaboration. He always asks: why do I care about this story? Why do I care about this character? And aims to draw in the audience early on.

== Personal life ==
Spotnitz lives with his family in London.

Spotnitz said in an interview about his show The Man in the High Castle: "Frank is the closest to me in the TV series, because my father's Jewish, my mother's not. I don't identify as Jewish in a religious way. I'm not a religious person, and yet if you were living in a Nazi state, that would be no defense. Jews don't get to decide if they're Jews. That's really terrifying to me."

== Filmography ==
Year	Title	Distributor
1996	Millennium	Fox
1996–2002	The X-Files	Fox
1998	Inside the X-Files	Fox
1998	The X-Files: Fight the Future	20th Century Fox
1999	Harsh Realm	Fox
2001	The Lone Gunmen	Fox
2002–2003	Robbery Homicide Division	CBS
2005–2006	Night Stalker	ABC
2007	A.M.P.E.D.	Spike
2008	The X-Files: I Want to Believe	20th Century Fox
2008	Samurai Girl	ABC Family
2011	Strike Back: Project Dawn	Sky One/Cinemax
2012	Hunted	BBC One/Cinemax
2014	Transporter: The Series	M6
2015	Crossing Lines	NBC
2015–2019	The Man in the High Castle	Amazon
2016–2019	Medici	RAI
2017	The Indian Detective	CTV
2017–2019	Ransom	CBS
2020–22	Devils	Sky Atlantic
2021	Leonardo	RAI
2025	We Come In Peace	TV4

=== The X-Files credits ===
No. overall	No. of season	No. in season	Title	Directed by	Written by	Original air date	Prod.code	US viewers (millions)
41	2	17	"End Game"	Rob Bowman	Frank Spotnitz	February 17, 1995	2X17	17.5
48	2	24	"Our Town"	Rob Bowman	Frank Spotnitz	May 12, 1995	2X24	14.5
58	3	9	"Nisei"	David Nutter	Chris Carter, Howard Gordon, Frank Spotnitz	November 24, 1995	3X09	16.36
59	3	10	"731"	Rob Bowman	Frank Spotnitz	December 1, 1995	3X10	17.68
64	3	15	"Piper Maru"	Rob Bowman	Frank Spotnitz, Chris Carter	February 9, 1996	3X15	16.44
65	3	16	"Apocrypha"	Kim Manners	Frank Spotnitz, Chris Carter	February 16, 1996	3X16	16.71
81	4	8	"Tunguska"	Kim Manners	Frank Spotnitz, Chris Carter	November 24, 1996	4X09	18.85
82	4	9	"Terma"	Rob Bowman	Frank Spotnitz, Chris Carter	December 1, 1996	4X10	17.34
85	4	12	"Leonard Betts"	Kim Manners	Vince Gilligan, John Shiban, Frank Spotnitz	January 26, 1997	4X14	29.15
87	4	14	"Memento Mori"	Rob Bowman	Chris Carter, Vince Gilligan, John Shiban, Frank Spotnitz	February 9, 1997	4X15	19.10
90	4	17	"Tempus Fugit"	Rob Bowman	Chris Carter, Frank Spotnitz	March 16, 1997	4X17	18.85
91	4	18	"Max"	Kim Manners	Chris Carter, Frank Spotnitz	March 23, 1997	4X18	18.34
94	4	21	"Zero Sum"	Kim Manners	Howard Gordon, Frank Spotnitz	April 27, 1997	4X21	18.60
101	5	4	"Detour"	Brett Dowler	Frank Spotnitz	November 23, 1997	5X04	22.88
103	5	6	"Christmas Carol"	Peter Markle	Vince Gilligan, John Shiban, Frank Spotnitz	December 7, 1997	5X05	20.91
104	5	7	"Emily"	Kim Manners	Vince Gilligan, John Shiban, Frank Spotnitz	December 14, 1997	5X07	20.94
110	5	13	"Patient X"	Kim Manners	Chris Carter, Frank Spotnitz	March 1, 1998	5X13	20.21
111	5	14	"The Red and the Black"	Chris Carter	Chris Carter, Frank Spotnitz	March 8, 1998	5X14	19.98
112	5	15	"Travelers"	William A. Graham	John Shiban, Frank Spotnitz	March 29, 1998	5X15	15.06
114	5	17	"All Souls"	Allen Coulter	Story by: Billy Brown, Dan Angel Teleplay by: Frank Spotnitz, John Shiban	April 26, 1998	5X17	13.44
121	6	4	"Dreamland"	Kim Manners	Vince Gilligan, John Shiban, Frank Spotnitz	November 29, 1998	6ABX04	17.48
122	6	5	"Dreamland II"	Michael Watkins	Vince Gilligan, John Shiban, Frank Spotnitz	December 6, 1998	6ABX05	17.01
128	6	11	"Two Fathers"	Kim Manners	Chris Carter, Frank Spotnitz	February 7, 1999	6ABX11	18.81
129	6	12	"One Son"	Rob Bowman	Chris Carter, Frank Spotnitz	February 14, 1999	6ABX12	16.57
135	6	18	"Milagro"	Kim Manners	Story by: John Shiban, Frank Spotnitz Teleplay by: Chris Carter	April 18, 1999	6ABX18	15.2
138	6	21	"Field Trip"	Kim Manners	Story by: Frank Spotnitz Teleplay by: John Shiban, Vince Gilligan	May 9, 1999	6ABX21	15.38
139	6	22	"Biogenesis"	Rob Bowman	Chris Carter, Frank Spotnitz	May 16, 1999	6ABX22	15.86
143	7	4	"Millennium"	Thomas J. Wright	Vince Gilligan, Frank Spotnitz	November 28, 1999	7ABX05	15.09
147	7	8	"The Amazing Maleeni"	Thomas J. Wright	Vince Gilligan, John Shiban, Frank Spotnitz	January 16, 2000	7ABX08	16.18
149	7	10	"Sein und Zeit"	Michael Watkins	Chris Carter, Frank Spotnitz	February 6, 2000	7ABX10	13.95
150	7	11	"Closure"	Kim Manners	Chris Carter, Frank Spotnitz	February 13, 2000	7ABX11	15.35
153	7	14	"Theef"	Kim Manners	Vince Gilligan, John Shiban, Frank Spotnitz	March 12, 2000	7ABX14	11.91
168	8	7	"Via Negativa"	Tony Wharmby	Frank Spotnitz	December 17, 2000	8ABX07	12.37
172	8	11	"The Gift"	Kim Manners	Frank Spotnitz	February 4, 2001	8ABX11	14.6
173	8	12	"Medusa"	Richard Compton	Frank Spotnitz	February 11, 2001	8ABX13	13.8
174	8	13	"Per Manum"	Kim Manners	Chris Carter, Frank Spotnitz	February 18, 2001	8ABX08	16.0
175	8	14	"This Is Not Happening"	Kim Manners	Chris Carter, Frank Spotnitz	February 25, 2001	8ABX14	16.9
176	8	15	"Deadalive"	Tony Wharmby	Chris Carter, Frank Spotnitz	April 1, 2001	8ABX15	12.4
177	8	16	"Three Words"	Tony Wharmby	Chris Carter, Frank Spotnitz	April 8, 2001	8ABX18	N/A
180	8	19	"Alone"	Frank Spotnitz	Frank Spotnitz	May 6, 2001	8ABX19	12.7
183	9	1	"Nothing Important Happened Today"	Kim Manners	Chris Carter, Frank Spotnitz	November 11, 2001	9ABX01	10.6
184	9	2	"Nothing Important Happened Today II"	Tony Wharmby	Chris Carter, Frank Spotnitz	November 18, 2001	9ABX02	9.4
185	9	3	"Dæmonicus"	Frank Spotnitz	Frank Spotnitz	December 2, 2001	9ABX03	8.7
188	9	6	"Trust No 1"	Tony Wharmby	Chris Carter, Frank Spotnitz	January 6, 2002	9ABX08	8.4
191	9	9	"Provenance"	Kim Manners	Chris Carter, Frank Spotnitz	March 3, 2002	9ABX10	9.7
192	9	10	"Providence"	Chris Carter	Chris Carter, Frank Spotnitz	March 10, 2002	9ABX11	8.4
197	9	15	"Jump the Shark"	Cliff Bole	Vince Gilligan, John Shiban, Frank Spotnitz	April 21, 2002	9ABX15	8.6
198	9	16	"William"	David Duchovny	Story by: David Duchovny, Frank Spotnitz, Chris Carter Teleplay by: Chris Carter	April 28, 2002	9ABX17	9.3

== Books ==
- TV Outside the Box: Trailblazing in the Digital Television Revolution, Neil Landau (2015)
- Dalla parte di John Fante, by Giovanna Di Lello and Toni Ricciardi (Rome: Carocci 2020)
