= Kim Manners =

American television producer, director, and actor

- Born: January 13, 1951; United States
- Died: January 25, 2009 (aged 58); Los Angeles, California, United States
- Occupations: Director, producer
- Years active: 1978–2009

Kim Manners (January 13, 1951 – January 25, 2009) was an American television producer and director best known for his work on The X-Files and Supernatural.

== Early life ==
Kim Manners was raised in a show business family. His father, Sam Manners (born Savino Maneri in Cleveland, Ohio) had production credits on shows such as The Wild Wild West and Route 66. Manners did some acting as a child; his first role was at the age of three in a Chevrolet commercial. He also watched and occasionally participated in his father's work as well as the work of William Beaudine, director of The Adventures of Rin Tin Tin. It was Beaudine who inspired Manners to become a director.

Manners' brother, Kelly, has production and directorial credits on Angel, Buffy the Vampire Slayer and Dollhouse and his sister, Tana, works as a television director.

== Career ==
Manners made his directorial debut in 1978 at age 27, directing an episode of Charlie's Angels. Prior to this, he had worked as unit production manager on the show and as an assistant director on a handful of other projects. Other notable directorial credits to Manners' name include episodes of 21 Jump Street, Mission: Impossible, Star Trek: The Next Generation, Baywatch, K-9000, and The Commish.

Manners left his directing job at Stephen J. Cannell Productions in 1993 to work on the television series The Adventures of Brisco County, Jr. He directed 7 of the series' 27 episodes, more than any other director for the show. He joked that he was the series' "mascot director". He was happy with the work for the series, and felt that it "stretched" him creatively. He said, "It really woke me up as a director, almost spiritually…" and that directing for Brisco was a large contributing factor to his later success as a regular director on The X-Files.

Manners signed on to produce and direct The X-Files in the show's second season at the advice of Rob Bowman, who had worked on the show in its first season, and James Wong and Glen Morgan, who were writers for the show and had previously worked with Manners on 21 Jump Street.

Manners, along with his fellow producers on The X-Files, was nominated for four Emmy Awards for Outstanding Drama Series in 1995, 1996, 1997 and 1998. Manners was referenced in the X-Files episode "Jose Chung's From Outer Space" with a foul-mouthed police detective named after him. Following the finale of The X-Files in 2002, Manners directed a number of small projects before signing on to direct and produce Supernatural in 2005.

== Death and memorial ==
Manners died of lung cancer in Los Angeles, on January 25, 2009, at age 58.

The closing credits of the Supernatural season four episode "Death Takes a Holiday", which aired on March 12, 2009, showed two photos of Manners, along with the caption "We dedicate the entire season to Kim Manners" and a message stating, "We miss you, Kim." The fifth episode of the second season of AMC's Breaking Bad, titled "Breakage", which premiered on April 5, 2009, featured a dedication in the end credits, which stated "Dedicated to our Friend Kim Manners". The episode "Mulder and Scully Meet the Were-Monster", from the revival season for The X Files which aired on February 1, 2016, features a scene where Mulder sits against Manners' gravestone, inscribed with Manners' real date of birth and death, and the phrase, "Let's Kick It in the Ass."

== Filmography ==
| Year | Title | Notes |
|---|---|---|
| 1979–1981 | Charlie's Angels | 8 episodes |
| 1983–1984 | Automan | 4 episodes |
| 1983–1985 | Matt Houston | 10 episodes |
| 1984–1986 | Simon & Simon | 5 episodes |
| 1985 | Street Hawk | 1 episode |
| 1985 | Finder of Lost Loves | 1 episode |
| 1985–1986 | Hardcastle and McCormick | 6 episodes |
| 1985–1986 | Riptide | 2 episodes |
| 1986 | Sledge Hammer! | 1 episode |
| 1986–1987 | Hunter | 2 episodes |
| 1986–1987 | Stingray | 2 episodes |
| 1986–1987 | Sidekicks | 3 episodes |
| 1987–1988 | J.J. Starbuck | 2 episodes |
| 1988 | Star Trek: The Next Generation | 1 episode |
| 1988 | Wiseguy | 1 episode |
| 1988 | Mission: Impossible | 2 episodes |
| 1988 | Paradise | 1 episode |
| 1989 | Baywatch | 2 episodes |
| 1989–1990 | Booker | 2 episodes |
| 1987–1990 | 21 Jump Street | 12 episodes |
| 1990 | Broken Badges | 2 episodes |
| 1991 | The 100 Lives of Black Jack Savage | 1 episode |
| 1991 | K-9000 | 1 episode |
| 1991–1994 | The Commish | 7 episodes |
| 1993 | The Hat Squad | 2 episodes |
| 1993–1994 | The Adventures of Brisco County, Jr. | 7 episodes |
| 1994 | Fortune Hunter | 1 episode |
| 1994 | Greyhounds | 1 episode |
| 1994–1997 | M.A.N.T.I.S. | 3 episodes |
| 1995–2002 | The X-Files | 52 episodes |
| 2000 | Harsh Realm | 1 episode |
| 2003 | Alaska | 1 episode |
| 2005 | Empire | 2 episodes |
| 2005 | Over There | 1 episode |
| 2005–2008 | Supernatural | 16 episodes |
