= Fallen Angel (The X-Files) =

- The X-Files episode
- Episode no.: Season 1 Episode 10
- Directed by: Larry Shaw
- Written by: Howard Gordon; Alex Gansa
- Production code: 1X09
- Original air date: November 19, 1993
- Running time: 45 minutes

Guest appearances
- Frederick Coffin as Joseph McGrath; Marshall Bell as Calvin Henderson; Scott Bellis as Max Fenig; Jerry Hardin as Deep Throat

Episode chronology
← Previous "Space"	Next → "Eve"
- The X-Files season 1

"Fallen Angel" is the tenth episode of the first season of the American science fiction television series The X-Files, premiering on the Fox network on November 19, 1993. It was written by Howard Gordon and Alex Gansa, and directed by Larry Shaw. The episode saw Jerry Hardin reprise his role as Deep Throat. The episode explored the series' overarching mythology. The episode was mostly well received.

The show centers on FBI agents Fox Mulder (David Duchovny) and Dana Scully (Gillian Anderson), who work on cases called X-Files, which are linked to the paranormal. When Mulder and Scully investigate a mysterious crash site, they find that the official reports of the incident may be covering up the crash of a UFO. Meanwhile, Mulder meets a ufologist who he believes may be a former abductee.

The episode introduced the UFO fanatic character Max Fenig, portrayed by Scott Bellis, who would later return in the fourth season episodes "Tempus Fugit" and "Max". In addition, Fenig also laid the template for the introduction of The Lone Gunmen in the later first-season episode "E.B.E."

== Plot ==
Near Townsend, Wisconsin, a UFO crashes in the woods. When the deputy sheriff arrives on the scene, he is killed by an invisible figure while surrounded by bright white light. As the U.S. Air Force monitors the situation, Colonel Calvin Henderson (Marshall Bell), the military's UFO reclamations expert, launches an operation to clean up the crash site.

After consulting with Deep Throat, Fox Mulder (David Duchovny) travels to Wisconsin and takes photos of the site, only to be captured. After being interrogated by Henderson, he is detained alongside an eccentric NICAP member named Max Fenig (Scott Bellis), who was also captured in the woods. The next morning, Dana Scully (Gillian Anderson) arrives to retrieve Mulder, telling him that FBI Section Chief Joseph McGrath is threatening to shut down the X-Files because of his actions. She also claims that the wreckage has been identified as a downed Libyan fighter jet; Mulder dismisses this explanation. Meanwhile, the invisible occupant of the UFO passes through an electronic fence set up around the woods, escaping into the outside world.

The agents return to Mulder's motel room, finding it ransacked by Max. He turns out to be a fan of Mulder's, having followed NICAP's research into his work on the X-Files. Max brings the agents to his Airstream trailer, where he shows them audio transmissions from the deputy, as well as a fire crew that also arrived at the crash site. Mulder and Scully visit the deputy's widow, who claims the government won't release her husband's body and has threatened her into silence. They also meet a doctor who treated the deputy and the fire crew, revealing that they died of abnormally severe burns; he claims that he was also threatened. Henderson arrives at the hospital with a group of burned soldiers, who were attacked after they cornered the invisible alien at their base.

Mulder returns to the motel and finds Max inside his trailer, having an apparent epileptic seizure. As Mulder tends to Max, he discovers a mysterious scar behind his ear. Mulder reviews earlier X-Files, discovering similar scars on two reported alien abductees. Scully believes that whatever abduction experience Max had was a schizophrenic delusion, having noticed medication in his trailer. But Mulder believes that Max, despite his interest in UFOs, is completely unaware of his experiences and was guided to Townsend by his abductors on the night of the crash.

The Air Force tracks a larger UFO as it hovers over Townsend. The invisible alien enters Max's trailer and abducts him. When the agents visit the trailer and find Max missing, an Army radio transmission reveals that he has been transported to a waterfront. They race to save Max as Henderson's men scour the area searching for him. The alien kills two soldiers who encounter Max, causing him to flee into a warehouse. As Mulder finds Max inside, the building is surrounded by Henderson's forces. Mulder tries to comfort Max but is attacked and injured by the alien. Mulder then sees Max floating in a pillar of light before vanishing. When Henderson finds that Max is missing, he orders Mulder arrested.

Back in Washington, both Mulder and Scully report to Section Chief McGrath, who does not believe their claims. McGrath offers an especially harsh reprimand to Mulder and presents written testimony by Henderson claiming that Max's body was found in a cargo container. McGrath and his disciplinary board decide to shut down the X-Files and dismiss Mulder from the FBI, but the decision is vetoed by Deep Throat, who feels it would be more dangerous for them to allow Mulder to turn whistleblower than to let him continue his work.

== Production ==
The Academic Quadrangle at Simon Fraser University was used to depict the J. Edgar Hoover Building.

"Fallen Angel" was written by Howard Gordon and Alex Gansa, and directed by Larry Shaw. The episode foreshadows the closing of the X-Files, which would occur in the season finale of the first season, "The Erlenmeyer Flask". The character Max Fenig also laid the template for the introduction of The Lone Gunmen in the later first-season episode "E.B.E.". Bellis would reprise his role as Max in the fourth season episodes "Tempus Fugit" and "Max", which explained the fate of the character after his disappearance in this episode. Max's NICAP baseball cap would make a brief appearance in Mulder's office in "Beyond the Sea", later in the first season.

The scenes depicting Washington in the episode were filmed at Simon Fraser University on Burnaby Mountain in British Columbia. Shooting at this location was made difficult by the confined space available in which to set up the necessary equipment. The invisible alien featured in this episode appears to be inspired by the movie Predator. The alien was deliberately made invisible in order for it to be scarier to the audience, with series creator Chris Carter noting that "what you don't see is scarier than what you do see". Casting director Lynne Carrow was proud of Bellis' performance as Max, calling him perhaps her proudest find in casting the show, saying that he "just knocked our socks off". Carter also praised the performance of guest star Marshall Bell as Colonel Henderson and was proud that the episode permitted the producers to expand the role of Deep Throat. Actor Brent Stait, who plays Corporal Taylor in the episode, teaches alongside series regular William B. Davis at the William Davis Centre for Actors Study in Vancouver.

== Broadcast and reception ==
"Fallen Angel" premiered on the Fox network on November 19, 1993. This episode earned a Nielsen household rating of 5.4, with a nine share, meaning that in the United States, roughly 5.4 percent of all television-equipped households, and nine percent of households watching television, were tuned in to the episode. It was viewed by 5.1 million households. It was, and would thereafter permanently remain, the lowest-rated episode of the series ever broadcast.

The episode was mostly well-received, with a retrospective of the first season in Entertainment Weekly rating it a B+, describing it as "A very cool-looking episode that does the best job so far of illuminating the agents' position with relation to the government "; also noting the character of Max Fenig as a precursor to those of The Lone Gunmen. Keith Phipps, writing for The A.V. Club, also rated the episode a B+, calling it "a strong entry", finding that it served as a "slow reveal" of the series' themes. Phipps also noted the importance of Max Fenig as a sign of "the human toll exacted by all the dark goings on" in the series, claiming that "without Max we just get Mulder and Scully chasing a mysterious downed object and coming up empty-handed. With Max, we start to realize the stakes for which they're playing". Matt Haigh, writing for Den of Geek, reviewed the episode negatively, calling it "a mundane forty minutes" that "really fails to impress", and noting that the plot follows "more or less the same pattern", as the series' previous mythology episodes. Robert Shearman, in their book Wanting to Believe: A Critical Guide to The X-Files, Millennium & The Lone Gunmen, rated the episode three stars out of five. Shearman described "Fallen Angel" as having been produced "with style and wit", feeling that it featured a relatively static plot but was nevertheless entertaining. He found Duchovny's performance in the episode, and its final scene featuring Deep Throat's ambiguous motivations, to have been the highlights of an episode otherwise filled with "smoke and mirrors"; comparing it to the earlier episode "Conduit" in this regard.

== Footnotes ==
=== References ===
- Edwards, Ted (1996). X-Files Confidential. Little, Brown and Company. ISBN 0-316-21808-1.
- Gradnitzer, Louisa; Pittson, Todd (1999). X Marks the Spot: On Location with The X-Files. Arsenal Pulp Press. ISBN 1-55152-066-4.
- Lovece, Frank (1996). The X-Files Declassified. Citadel Press. ISBN 0-8065-1745-X.
- Lowry, Brian (1995). The Truth is Out There: The Official Guide to the X-Files. Harper Prism. ISBN 0-06-105330-9.
- Shearman, Robert (2009). Wanting to Believe: A Critical Guide to The X-Files, Millennium & The Lone Gunmen. Mad Norwegian Press. ISBN 978-0-9759446-9-1.
