= Tempus Fugit (The X-Files) =

- The X-Files episode
- Episode no.: Season 4 Episode 17
- Directed by: Rob Bowman
- Written by: Chris Carter; Frank Spotnitz
- Production code: 4X17
- Original air date: March 16, 1997
- Running time: 44 minutes

Guest appearances
- Joe Spano as Mike Millar; Tom O'Brien as Sergeant Louis Frisch; Scott Bellis as Max Fenig; Chilton Crane as Sharon Graffia; Brendan Beiser as Pendrell; Greg Michaels as Scott Garrett; Robert Moloney as Bruce Bearfeld; Felicia Shulman as Motel Manager; Rick Dobran as Sergeant Armando Gonzales; Jerry Schram as Larold Rebhun; David Palffy as Dark Man; Mark Wilson as Pilot; Marek Wiedman as Investigator; Jon Raitt as Father; Kathy Rollheiser as Mother; Maria Lusia Cianni as Teenager; Peter Taraviras as Go Team Member; Mark Schooley as Go Team Member 2

Episode chronology
← Previous "Unrequited"	Next → "Max"
- The X-Files season 4

"Tempus Fugit" is the seventeenth episode of the fourth season of the American science fiction television series The X-Files. It premiered on the Fox network on March 16, 1997. It was directed by Rob Bowman, and written by Frank Spotnitz and series creator Chris Carter. "Tempus Fugit" featured guest appearances by Joe Spano, Tom O'Brien and Brendan Beiser, and saw the return of Scott Bellis as alien abductee Max Fenig. The episode helped to explore the overarching mythology, or fictional history of The X-Files. "Tempus Fugit" earned a Nielsen household rating of 11.9, being watched by 18.85 million people in its initial broadcast. The title translates from Latin as "time flies."

The show centers on FBI special agents Fox Mulder (David Duchovny) and Dana Scully (Gillian Anderson) who work on cases linked to the paranormal, called X-Files. In the episode, Max Fenig—an old acquaintance of Mulder—is found dead following an airplane crash, which Mulder believes to have been caused by a UFO attempting to abduct Fenig. "Tempus Fugit" is a two-part episode, with the plot continuing in the next episode, "Max".

"Tempus Fugit" was conceived when the series' special effects supervisor Dave Gauthier constructed an elaborate rig capable of simulating a crashing airplane. Carter and Spotnitz expanded upon the idea of a crash to bring back the character of Fenig, who had last been seen in season one's "Fallen Angel". "Tempus Fugit" received mixed to positive critical reception, and earned the production crew two Emmy Award nominations, including a win for Outstanding Sound Editing For A Series.

== Plot ==
Four years after his abduction, Max Fenig (Scott Bellis) is traveling on Flight 549, which is flying over upstate New York. He watches another man on the plane who seems to be following him. The man heads to the plane's bathroom, where he assembles a zip gun. However, when he comes back out, the airplane begins shaking and a bright light flashes outside, showing that the plane is encountering a UFO. The emergency door next to Max's seat is opened.

Elsewhere, Fox Mulder (David Duchovny) and Dana Scully (Gillian Anderson) celebrate Scully's birthday. They are approached by a woman named Sharon Graffia, who claims to be Max's sister; she tells them that Max planned to deliver something to Mulder, but that his flight to Washington has crashed. The agents head to the crash site in Northville, New York, and attend an NTSB meeting where Flight 549's final transmissions are shown. Mulder theorizes that the plane was forced down by aliens attempting to abduct Max; the NTSB team, led by chief investigator Mike Millar (Joe Spano), dismisses his claims.

When Mulder and Scully survey the crash site, they realize that there is a nine-minute disparity between the crash and the time on the victims' wristwatches, indicating missing time. Mulder believes that Max was abducted from the plane and that his body will not be found. Meanwhile, Scott Garrett, a Man in Black posing as an NTSB investigator, steals the zip gun from the assassin's body and erases his face and fingerprints with acid. Larold Rehbun, a passenger who sat next to Max, is found alive. His injuries indicate exposure to radiation.

Upon being confronted by Scully, Sharon denies that Max brought a radioactive substance aboard the plane, but gives up details about his underground life. Scully subsequently tells Mulder that Max worked at a nuclear weapons assembly facility in Colorado under an alias, and believes that he may have caused the crash after bringing plutonium on board; Mulder, however, believes that Max was taken off the plane by a UFO, and that Rehbun's injuries were caused by exposure to the craft. Scully informs Mulder that Max's body has already been pulled from the crash site. Meanwhile, Sharon is abducted from her hotel room.

After identifying Max's body, Mulder finds that the wristwatches have been stolen from the other victims. He refutes the NTSB's official explanation of malfunction as a cause of the crash, and is doubtful that the true cause will be found unless they discern what happened during the nine minutes of missing time. The agents visit Sergeant Louis Frisch (Tom O'Brien), an air traffic controller from the U.S. Air Force who was on duty during the crash. Frisch denies anything unusual happened. However, after the agents leave, Frisch and a colleague argue over whether to reveal the "truth" about Flight 549's demise.

After finding Sharon's trashed hotel room, Mulder meets with Millar, who tells him that the door was pulled off the plane from the outside while it was in flight. Later, Frisch finds his colleague dead from a faked suicide. A group of commandos arrive to capture Frisch, but he escapes. Frisch goes to see Mulder and Scully, telling them that he lied before and that his commanding officer had ordered him to track the plane's coordinates as it was being intercepted by a second aircraft. Seconds later, there was an explosion and the plane disappeared from his radar. Mulder believes that a third aircraft, a UFO, approached the plane and was destroyed by the second aircraft, also causing Flight 549 to crash. The agents leave with Frisch and are soon chased by the commandos, but they manage to lose them by driving under a landing plane. Meanwhile, Millar returns to the crash site and encounters a UFO. He finds Sharon nearby, having just been returned by her abductors.

Scully returns to Washington with Frisch while Mulder heads to Great Sacandaga Lake, searching for the crashed UFO. Scully brings Frisch to a local bar where they run into fellow FBI agent Pendrell (Brendan Beiser). Garrett soon enters the bar seeking to kill Frisch, accidentally shooting Pendrell instead while Scully shoots him back. Meanwhile, Mulder arrives at the lake where he finds a team of men already searching for the crashed UFO. He dives underwater and finds the craft, including an alien body. Before he can return to the surface, a bright light shines down from above the water.

== Production ==
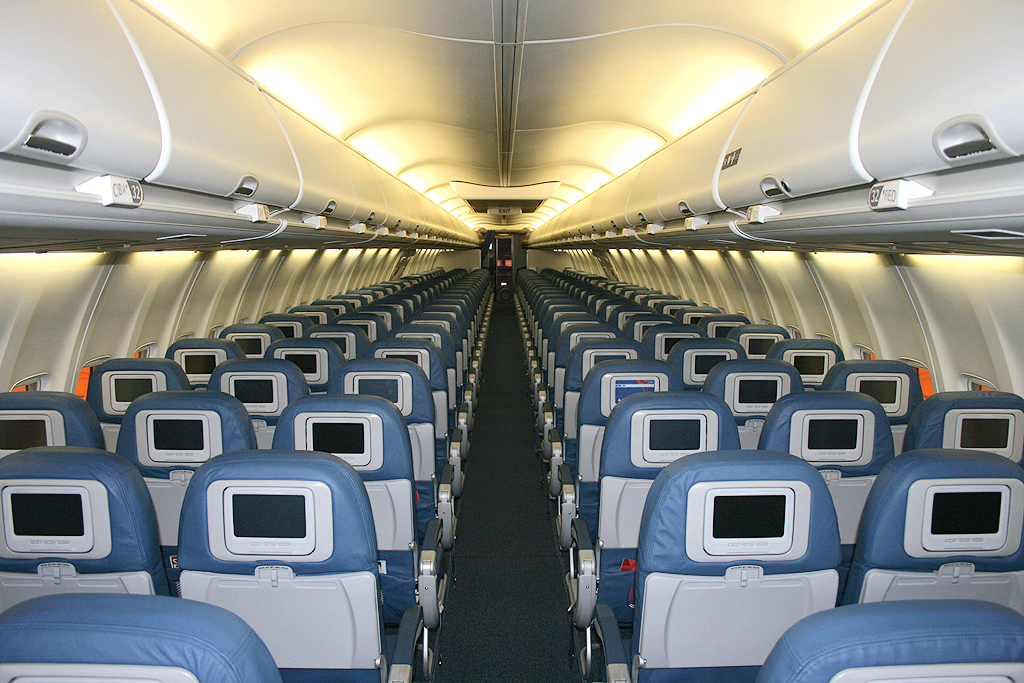
Dave Gauthier's Boeing 737 rig was the basis of the episode's conception.

=== Writing ===
During the production of the third season, special effects supervisor Dave Gauthier constructed an elaborate mock-up of a Boeing 737 airplane in order to be able to simulate a crash. Series creator Chris Carter decided to make use of this rig during the fourth season. When conceiving of the episode, the desire to add to Fox Mulder's emotional involvement by having someone he knew on board led to the writers bringing back the character of Max Fenig to be that person.

Scott Bellis, who had previously portrayed Fenig in the first season episode "Fallen Angel", had auditioned for other roles on the show in the interim, but had always been rejected by the producers because his character was felt to be too memorable. Bellis met series star David Duchovny at a gym several times, and learnt from him that the character of Max was being considered for a two-part episode. The episode's co-writer Frank Spotnitz did not want to have Fenig's appearance "milked" or do something the show had already done. As such he came up with the idea to kill off Fenig in the first part of the episode, which he felt was "a bold choice".

=== Filming ===
Gauthier's 737 rig—which required 400 U.S. gallons (1,500 L) of hydraulic fluid to mimic an airplane fuselage movement across multiple axes in order to better simulate turbulence; it could rotate 22 degrees each way about its length, and move four feet to either side. The fuselage could be opened up at intervals every 6 feet (1.8 m) to better allow cameras to record inside it. The show's producers wanted the plane crash site and investigation to be as authentic as possible, so they used a National Transportation Safety Board official to act as their technical advisor on the episode to ensure that everything was properly recreated. The NTSB officials noted that the site was authentic in every way "except for the smell"; Carter has noted that this level of verisimilitude left some of the crew members "frightened by their work". Director Rob Bowman admitted that the episode exceeded its given budget, noting that Carter would often defend him from Fox studio officials angry at his production costs.

== Broadcast and reception ==
"Tempus Fugit" premiered on the Fox network on March 16, 1997, and was first broadcast in the United Kingdom on BBC Two on January 14, 1998. The episode earned a Nielsen household rating of 11.9 with an 18 share, meaning that roughly 11.9 percent of all television-equipped households, and 18 percent of households watching television, were tuned in to the episode. A total of 18.85 million viewers watched this episode during its original airing.

The episode received mixed to positive reviews from critics. Zack Handlen, writing for The A.V. Club, rated "Tempus Fugit" an A−. Handlen praised the effectiveness of the cold open, and noted the episode highlighted how "particularly ruthless" the series was with its recurring cast, noting "the mortality rate helps to create a mood of ever-encroaching doom, as if the darkness that seems about to swallow Mulder and Scully in so many scenes ... is as much symbolic as it is literal". Paula Vitaris, writing for Cinefantastique, rated "Tempus Fugit" two-and-a-half stars out of four, describing it as "gripping" with "lots of action". However, Vitaris felt that the fleeting use of guest star Scott Bellis was "a waste", and that the discovery of an alien corpse towards the end "robs this story of any ambiguity". Robert Shearman, in his book Wanting to Believe: A Critical Guide to The X-Files, Millennium & The Lone Gunmen, rated the episode four stars out of five, calling it "the best conspiracy episode we've seen in nearly two years". Shearman felt that "Tempus Fugit" was "told very clearly, with remarkably little baggage", and praised the acting of guests Tom O'Brien and Joe Spano. Twelve members of the show's post-production crew won the 1997 Emmy Award for Outstanding Sound Editing For A Series for their work on this episode; while four others received a nomination for Outstanding Sound Mixing for a Drama Series.

== Bibliography ==
- Edwards, Ted (1996). X-Files Confidential. Little, Brown and Company. ISBN 0316218081.
- Hurwitz, Matt; Knowles, Chris (2008). The Complete X-Files. Insight Editions. ISBN 978-1933784809.
- Meisler, Andy (1998). I Want to Believe: The Official Guide to the X-Files Volume 3. Harper Prism. ISBN 0061053864.
- Shearman, Robert (2009). Wanting to Believe: A Critical Guide to The X-Files, Millennium & The Lone Gunmen. Mad Norwegian Press. ISBN 978-0975944691.
