= Joe Spano =

American actor (born 1946)

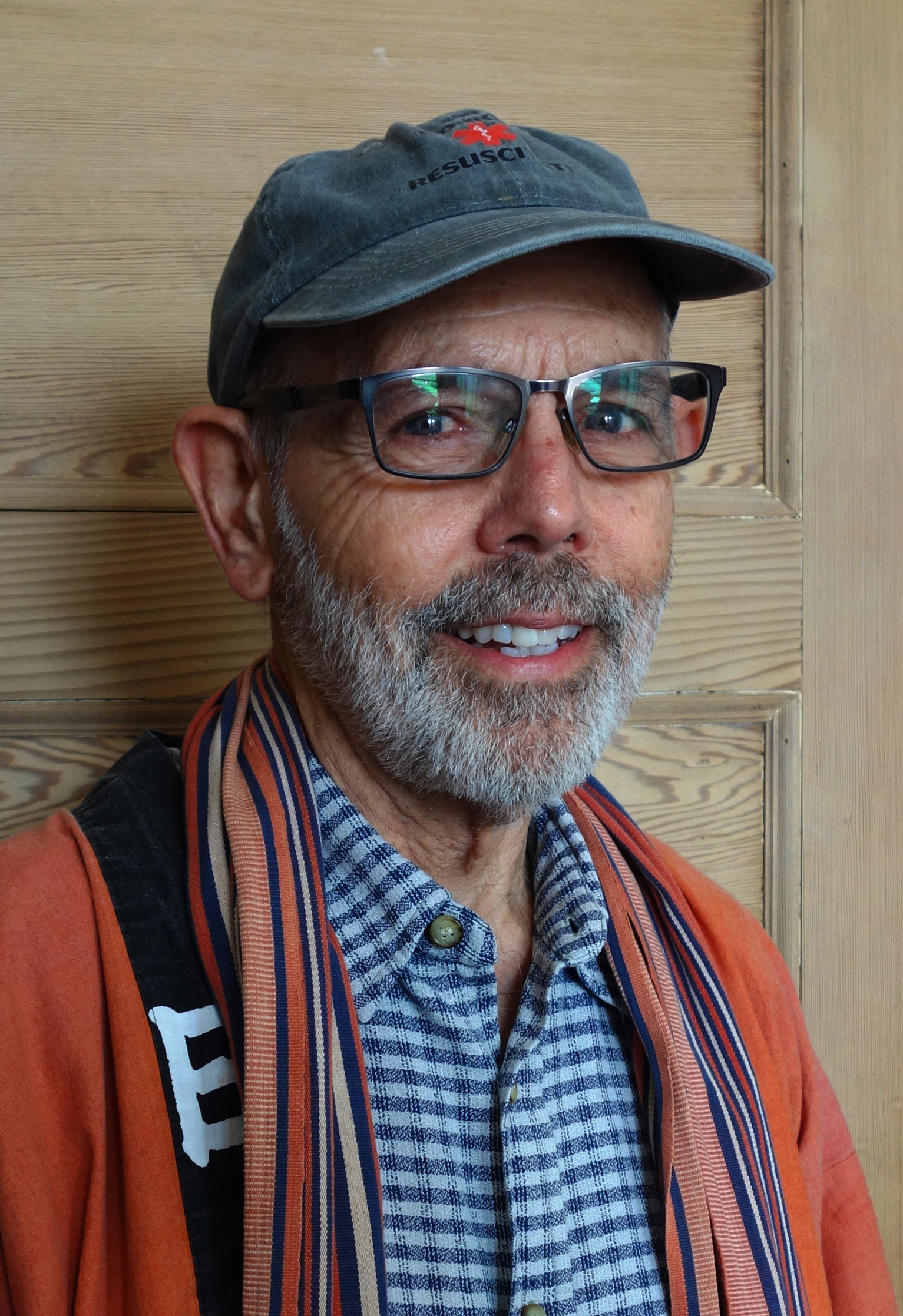
- Spano in October 2022
- Born: Joseph Peter Spano; July 7, 1946 (age 80)
- Occupation: Actor
- Years active: 1967–present
- Spouse: Joan Zerrien (m. 1980)
- Children: 2

Joseph Peter Spano (born July 7, 1946) is an American actor known best for his roles as Lt. Henry Goldblume on Hill Street Blues and FBI Special Agent Tobias C. Fornell on NCIS. He also voiced the Chuck E. Cheese (at the time Chuck E. Cheese's Pizza Time Theatre) character, Pasqually the Chef, from 1977 to 1983.

== Career ==
Spano was a member of the improvisation group The Wing, and in college debuted as Paris in a production of Romeo and Juliet in 1967. In 1968, he helped found the Berkeley Repertory Theatre, acting in its first production, and stayed with the company for ten years. He relocated to Hollywood during the late 1970s, obtaining guest roles for television and minor roles in American Graffiti (1973) and The Enforcer (1976).

In Hill Street Blues he played Henry Goldblume during the entire seven-year run of the series, first as a detective sergeant, later as a lieutenant. Goldblume was one of Hill Street precinct captain Frank Furillo's trusted junior officers, serving at times as a hostage negotiator and gangs relations officer. The character was sympathetic to crime victims, sometimes conflicting with his duties as a police officer. Spano was one of many actors appearing throughout each episode, which typically had several story lines intermingled.

After Hill Street Blues ended, Spano won recurring roles in television police shows Murder One (1995) and NYPD Blue (1993), again as a detective, and has appeared regularly in television movies and television shows like The X-Files (episodes "Tempus Fugit" and "Max"), Mercy Point and Amazing Grace. Spano won an Emmy award in 1988 for Best Guest Actor in a Drama Series for a role he played in an episode of Midnight Caller. He has appeared in several feature movies, including Apollo 13 and Primal Fear. His credits are often confused with Australian actor Joseph Spano. They are not related.

He is a veteran stage actor on the east and west coasts. Spano made his Broadway debut in 1992 in the Roundabout Theater revival of Arthur Miller's The Price, with Eli Wallach, which was nominated for a Tony for Best Revival. West coast stage credits include Eduardo Pavlovsky's Potestad, and David Mamet's Speed-the-Plow and American Buffalo, for which he was awarded an LA Drama Critics Circle Award. At the Rubicon Theater in Ventura he has played General Burgoyne in George Bernard Shaw's The Devil's Disciple, Greg in A. R. Gurney's Sylvia and Vladimir in Waiting for Godot. He is a member of the Antaeus Theater Company and a founding member of three other theater companies. He played a seductive vampire in the cult musical Dracula: A Musical Nightmare in a small Los Angeles theatre. He also appeared in the TV movie Brotherhood of Justice with Keanu Reeves and Kiefer Sutherland.

He is the voice of the Wild Flower Hotline for the Theodore Payne Foundation, which can be reached by telephoning (818) 768-1802.

=== NCIS ===
Spano has been a recurring character of NCIS since its premiere episode, "Yankee White", playing FBI Special Agent Tobias Fornell, the FBI counterpart to NCIS Special Agent Leroy Jethro Gibbs, portrayed by Mark Harmon. In Season 15, Fornell is no longer with the FBI, but is a private investigator.

Two episodes have used Fornell's personal life as the basis of an NCIS episode: one where Fornell's daughter is imperiled and another where Fornell's career is imperiled. In each episode, it is the friendship between Gibbs and Fornell which is invoked in order to involve NCIS in the resolution.

== Personal life ==
His parents were Vincent Dante Spano, a physician, and the former Virginia Jean Carpenter. He graduated from Archbishop Riordan High School in 1963, and he is an honorary member of the House of Russi. Spano and his wife Joan Zerrien, a therapist, were married in 1980, and have two adopted daughters.

== Filmography ==
=== Film ===
| Year | Title | Role | Notes |
|---|---|---|---|
| 1972 | One Is a Lonely Number | Earl of Kent | |
| 1973 | American Graffiti | Victor "Vic" | |
| 1973 | Warlock Moon | John Devers | |
| 1976 | The Enforcer | Mitch, Robber | Uncredited |
| 1978 | Northern Lights | John Sorensen | |
| 1980 | Roadie | "Ace" | |
| 1981 | The Incredible Shrinking Woman | Guard | |
| 1985 | Terminal Choice | Frank Holt | |
| 1994 | Rave Review | Lou | |
| 1995 | Apollo 13 | NASA Director | |
| 1996 | Primal Fear | Abel Stenner | |
| 1998 | Break Up | Priest | |
| 1998 | In Quiet Night | Gold | |
| 2000 | A Question of Faith | Duncan | |
| 2001 | Texas Rangers | Mr. Dunnison | |
| 2001 | Ticker | Captain R. J. Winters | |
| 2002 | Hart's War | J.M. Lange | |
| 2006 | Hollywoodland | Howard Strickling | |
| 2007 | Fracture | Joseph Pincus | |
| 2008 | Frost/Nixon | Network Executive | |
| 2026 | Hoppers | Elderly Beavertonian | Voice role |

=== Television ===
| Year | Title | Role | Notes |
|---|---|---|---|
| 1974 | The Streets of San Francisco | Toomey | Episode: "One Last Shot" |
| 1979 | Lou Grant | Jack Ridgeway, Larry | 2 episodes |
| 1979 | Trapper John, M.D. | Dr. Gallant | Episode: "Pilot" |
| 1980 | Tenspeed and Brown Shoe | Duff McCoy | Episode: "Diamonds Aren't Forever" |
| 1980 | Fighting Back: The Rocky Bleier Story | Captain Murphy | Television film |
| 1981 | Insight | Karl Rothman | Episode: "The Domino Effect" |
| 1981–1987 | Hill Street Blues | Henry Goldblume | Main role |
| 1986 | Brotherhood of Justice | Bob Grootemat | Television film |
| 1986 | The Greatest Adventure: Stories from the Bible | Jesus (voice) | Episode: "The Easter Story" |
| 1987 | Deep Dark Secrets | Eric Lloyd | Television film |
| 1987 | The Hogan Family | Mr. Cameron | Episode: "Poetic Injustice" |
| 1988 | L.A. Law | George Ripley | Episode: "Hey, Lick Me Over" |
| 1988 | Disaster at Silo 7 | Sergeant Swofford | Television film |
| 1989 | Midnight Caller | John Saringo | Episode: "The Execution of John Saringo" |
| 1989 | Cast the First Stone | Bill Spencer | Television film |
| 1990 | Blind Faith | Sal Caccaro | Miniseries; 2 episodes |
| 1990 | The Girl Who Came Between Them | Jim | Television film |
| 1990 | The Great Los Angeles Earthquake | Chad Spaulding | Television film |
| 1991 | The Summer My Father Grew Up | Louis | Television film |
| 1991 | For the Very First Time | Mr. Allen | Television film |
| 1991 | Fever | Junkman | Television film |
| 1992 | Civil Wars | Carl Sherensky | Episode: "The Old Man and the 'C'" |
| 1993 | Bloodlines: Murder in the Family | Hal Leventhal | Television film |
| 1993 | Reasonable Doubts | Jimmy Cooper | Episode: "Diminished Capacity" |
| 1993 | The Flood: Who Will Save Our Children? | Dr. Richard Koons | Television film |
| 1994 | Dream On | Policeman | Episode: "The Taking of Pablum 1-2-3" |
| 1995 | Amazing Grace | Dominick Corso | 5 episodes |
| 1995–1996 | Murder One | Ray Velacek | 15 episodes |
| 1996 | Her Costly Affair | Carl Weston | Television film |
| 1997 | The X-Files | Mike Millar | 2 episodes |
| 1997 | A Call to Remember | Dr. Green | Television film |
| 1997–1998 | Profiler | Mike Ramdak | 2 episodes |
| 1998 | From the Earth to the Moon | George Mueller | Episode: "Apollo One" |
| 1998 | JAG | Jack Murphy | Episode: "Clipped Wings" |
| 1998 | Logan's War: Bound by Honor | FBI Special Agent John Downing | Television film |
| 1998 | L.A. Doctors | Don Claybourne | Episode: "What About Bob?" |
| 1998 | Nash Bridges | FBI Agent Langdon | Episode: "Mystery Dance" |
| 1998–1999 | Mercy Point | Harris DeMilla | 7 episodes |
| 1999 | Touched by an Angel | James Cooper | Episode: "Such a Time as This" |
| 1999–2000 | Batman Beyond | Agent Bennet, Sniper, Boss (voice) | 4 episodes |
| 2000 | Strong Medicine | Jonathan Fried | Episode: "Brainchild" |
| 2001 | Providence | Dr. Carroll | 3 episodes |
| 2002 | The Invisible Man | Tom Moore | Episode: "Possessed" |
| 2002 | Static Shock | Mr. Osgood (voice) | Episode: "Jimmy" |
| 2002–2003 | NYPD Blue | John Clark Sr. | 15 episodes |
| 2003 | Boomtown | Henry Stein | Episode: "Home Invasion" |
| 2003–2024 | NCIS | Tobias Fornell | Recurring role |
| 2004 | Dragnet | Bill Kutler | Episode: "Riddance" |
| 2005 | Eyes | William Massey | Episode: "Trial" |
| 2006 | Crossing Jordan | Captain Innis | Episode: "Blame Game" |
| 2006 | The Closer | Dr. Rose | Episode: "Mom Duty" |
| 2006 | Standoff | Joe Suser | Episode: "Circling" |
| 2008 | Shark | Paul Faber | Episode: "Partners in Crime" |
| 2010 | In Plain Sight | Gabe Andrews, Gabe Marion | Episode: "A Priest Walks Into a Bar" |
| 2012 | The Mentalist | Greg Relin | Episode: "War of the Roses" |
| 2014 | NCIS: New Orleans | Tobias Fornell | Episode: "It Happened Last Night" |
| 2019 | Pearson | Mr. Allen | Episode: "The Rival" |

== Awards and nominations ==
Ovation Awards

- 2009: Nominated for Lead Actor in a Play for the role of George in the Rubicon Theatre Company production of Who's Afraid of Virginia Woolf?
