= Scott Bellis =

Canadian actor and director

Personal details
- Education: Studio 58

Scott Bellis is a Vancouver-based Canadian actor, director and theatre instructor. He has been working out of Vancouver since 1987. He was appointed as President of Canadian Actors' Equity Association in November 2017, having served as Councillor since 2012.

He is a founding member and Artistic Associate at Bard on the Beach Shakespeare Festival.

His television appearances have included Vancouver-based series such as The X-Files (as Max Fenig), The Dead Zone and MacGyver.

== Training ==
Bellis attended Studio 58 at Langara College in January 1985, graduating in 1987. He is the director and an instructor for the Arts Club's annual Actor's Intensive.

== Bard on the Beach ==
Scott Bellis first joined Bard on the Beach for their inaugural season in 1990, as an actor and supporter. He is considered one of the original founding members and has been involved in over 40 productions with the company. He became an Artistic Associate of Bard in 2004.

== Productions ==
Scott Bellis has been involved in over 130 productions across the country. Select companies include Bard on the Beach, Arts Club Theatre, Carousel Theater, Ruby Slippers, The Virtual Stage, Touchstone Theatre, Blackbird Theatre (Vancouver), Persephone Theatre (Saskatoon), Western Canada Theatre (Kamloops), Canadian Stage (Toronto), Vertigo (Calgary), and Manitoba Theatre Centre (Winnipeg).

Select Production Credits
Play	Role	Company	Year
The Rivals	Lucius O'Trigger	Blackbird	2015
King Lear	Fool	Bard on the Beach / Theatre Calgary	2015
Midsummer Night's Dream	Bottom	Bard on the Beach	2006/2014
Avenue Q		Arts Club	2013/2015
Hamlet	Hamlet	Bard on the Beach	1995
Bat Boy: The Musical		Patrick Street	2010
Art of Murder	Jack	Vertigo	2009
Aprés Moi		Ruby Slippers	2015
Hotel Bethlehem		Ruby Slippers	2013
James and the Giant Peach		Carousel	2015
St. Joan		Arts Club	2014
Educating Rita		Arts Club	2014
Equivocation		Persephone	2014
God of Carnage		Persephone	2011
Tear the Curtain!		Electric Company	2010
Pride and Prejudice		Arts Club	2016
Good People		Arts Club	2016
As You Like It	Touchstone	Bard on the Beach	2005
Julius Caesar	Brutus	Bard on the Beach	2007
Taming of the Shrew	Petruchio	Bard on the Beach	2001
Henry V	Henry V	Bard on the Beach	2002
King John	King John	Bard on the Beach	2012
Merry Wives of Windsor	Master Ford/Dr. Caius (2004)	Bard on the Beach	1994/ 2004/ 2012/ 2016
Macbeth	Duncan	Bard on the Beach	2018
Romeo and Juliet	Friar Lawrence	Bard on the Beach	2016
Comedy of Errors	Egeon	Bard on the Beach	2015
The Tempest	Alonso	Bard on the Beach	2014
Henry VI	Richard Duke of York	Bard on the Beach	2011
Richard III	Duke of Buckingham	Bard on the Beach	2011
All's Well that Ends Well	Parolles	Bard on the Beach	2009
Richard II	Northumberland	Bard on the Beach	2009
The Leisure Society		Ruby Slippers	2006
True Story		(r)Evolution	
Cyrano de Bergerac		Arts Club	2008
Poster Boys		Arts Club	2008
The Optimists		Arts Club	2007

Select Directing Credits
Play	Company	Year
Two Gentlemen of Verona	Bard on the Beach	2017
The Comedy of Errors	Bard on the Beach	2015
Antony and Cleopatra	Bard on the Beach	2010
A Midsummer Night's Dream	Studio 58	
Julius Caesar	Studio 58	
Richard III	Studio 58	
The Black Bonspiel of Wullie MacCrimmon	Persephone	2013
Twelfth Night	Carousel Theatre	

== Film credits ==
Bellis has participated in many television series including The Outer Limits, Smallville, and The Dead Zone, television movies and feature films such as Little Women, Timecop, and Antitrust. His role in The X-Files was that of the alien abductee Max Fenig in the episodes of "Fallen Angel," "Tempus Fugit," and "Max."

== Awards ==
Scott Bellis has been nominated for 20 Jessie Richardson Theatre Awards. He has received awards for his performances in A Midsummer Night's Dream (Bard, 2007), All's Well that Ends Well (Bard, 2010), Avenue Q (Arts Club 2014), Aprés Moi (Ruby Slippers, 2016).
