= Max (The X-Files) =

- The X-Files episode
- Episode no.: Season 4 Episode 18
- Directed by: Kim Manners
- Written by: Chris Carter; Frank Spotnitz
- Production code: 4X18
- Original air date: March 23, 1997
- Running time: 44 minutes

Guest appearances
- Mitch Pileggi as Walter Skinner; Brendan Beiser as Pendrell; Scott Bellis as Max Fenig; Chilton Crane as Sharon Graffia; John Destrey as Mr. Ballard; Rick Dobran as Armando Gonzales; Stacy Fair as a Flight Attendant; Jaclynn Grad as a Stewardess; Dave Hannay as Waiter #1; Braden Kayce as an Airport Security Officer; Stewart Laine as an MP; Greg Michaels as Scott Garrett; Tom O'Brien as Louis Frisch; Dafid Palffy as Dark Man; Regy Sayhay as Waiter #3; Jerry Schram as Larold Rebhun; Michael Short as Waiter #2; Joe Spano as Mike Millar; Val Stefoff as a Bartender; Mark Wilson as a Pilot

Episode chronology
← Previous "Tempus Fugit"	Next → "Synchrony"
- The X-Files season 4

"Max" is the eighteenth episode of the fourth season of the American science fiction television series The X-Files. It premiered on the Fox network on March 23, 1997. It was directed by Kim Manners, and written by Frank Spotnitz and series creator Chris Carter. "Max" featured guest appearances by Joe Spano, Tom O'Brien and Scott Bellis, and saw the final appearance of Brendan Beiser as special agent Pendrell. The episode helped to explore the overarching mythology, or fictional history of The X-Files. "Max" earned a Nielsen household rating of 11.6, being watched by 18.34 million people in its initial broadcast. The episode received mixed to positive reviews from critics.

The show centers on FBI special agents Fox Mulder (David Duchovny) and Dana Scully (Gillian Anderson) who work on cases linked to the paranormal, called X-Files. Following the airplane crash that killed alien abductee Max Fenig, Mulder is pursued by an assassin looking to recover an alien artifact. "Max" is a two-part episode, with the plot continuing from the previous episode, "Tempus Fugit".

Manners praised the large cast of extras used during production, concluding that they were the best he had worked with. "Max" featured scenes filmed at Vancouver International Airport and in a studio water tank, as well as using the custom-built Boeing 737 set constructed for "Tempus Fugit". Dialogue in the episode was inspired by the 1949 film The Third Man.

== Plot ==
=== Background ===
Max Fenig (Scott Bellis), a NICAP member, has been repeatedly abducted by aliens throughout his life. After meeting with FBI agent Fox Mulder (David Duchovny), Fenig was abducted once again, and thought to have been lost entirely. Several years later, Fenig is found dead amongst the victims of an airplane crash. Investigating the disaster, Mulder and his partner Dana Scully (Gillian Anderson) learn that the airplane crashed after being intercepted by a military jet—and possibly by an alien spacecraft. Mulder's search for evidence of such a craft leads to him diving to the bottom of Great Sacandaga Lake to find it; while Scully is ambushed by an assassin seeking to kill a military witness, leading to her colleague Pendrell (Brendan Beiser) being shot.

=== Events ===
Mulder is caught by a group of commandos after swimming to shore. In Washington, Scully tends to the critically wounded Pendrell while Scott Garrett, a Man in Black, escapes. Assistant Director Walter Skinner (Mitch Pileggi) arrives shortly afterwards and tells Scully that the orders to protect Frisch have been countermanded and he is being arrested for providing false testimony. Scully releases Mulder from confinement and tells him the "official" explanation for the crash, that Frisch and Gonzales caused the crash by mistakenly vectoring a military fighter craft with the plane, and that Frisch lied to cover it up. Mulder is skeptical of this latest explanation and thinks the crashed UFO he found underwater is really what was involved in the crash. Scully tells Mulder that Sharon is not really Max's sister, but rather an unemployed aeronautical engineer who met Max in a mental institution. She also tells him that Pendrell died from his wounds.

Mulder and Scully visit Max's trailer, and watch a tape of him where he talks about finding proof of alien existence. The military recovers the crashed UFO from the lake, including the alien body. The agents visit Millar, whose investigation has been unable to prove or disprove the military's cover story. Mulder tells Millar what he believed really happened. Mulder believes that Max boarded the plane with proof of alien life and that a UFO stopped the plane, abducting him. A military aircraft intercepted the two however, with orders to attack the UFO. While Max was being returned, the military aircraft struck, causing both the UFO and plane to crash.

Mulder visits Max's trailer again and looks through his mail, finding a luggage claim ticket. Scully visits Sharon, now in a mental institution, who tells Scully that she stole technology from her employer that Max believed was alien. The device was in three parts, one which she had, one that he brought on the plane and a third one. Mulder uses the claim ticket to obtain the third device at a New York airport and heads on a plane to return to Washington. Garrett, who is also aboard, sits next to him. Mulder soon realizes who Garrett is and holds him at gunpoint. Garrett does not care, telling Mulder that if he shoots him the plane will depressurize and he will be able to escape with a parachute he has with him. Mulder imprisons Garrett in the airplane bathroom but Garrett soon emerges with a zip gun and orders him to hand over the device. Suddenly the plane starts shaking and bright lights shine in through the windows. The plane touches down, both Garrett and the device are gone, and Mulder is missing nine minutes with no memory of what happened. The agents visit Sharon one last time in Max's trailer and say goodbye.

== Production ==
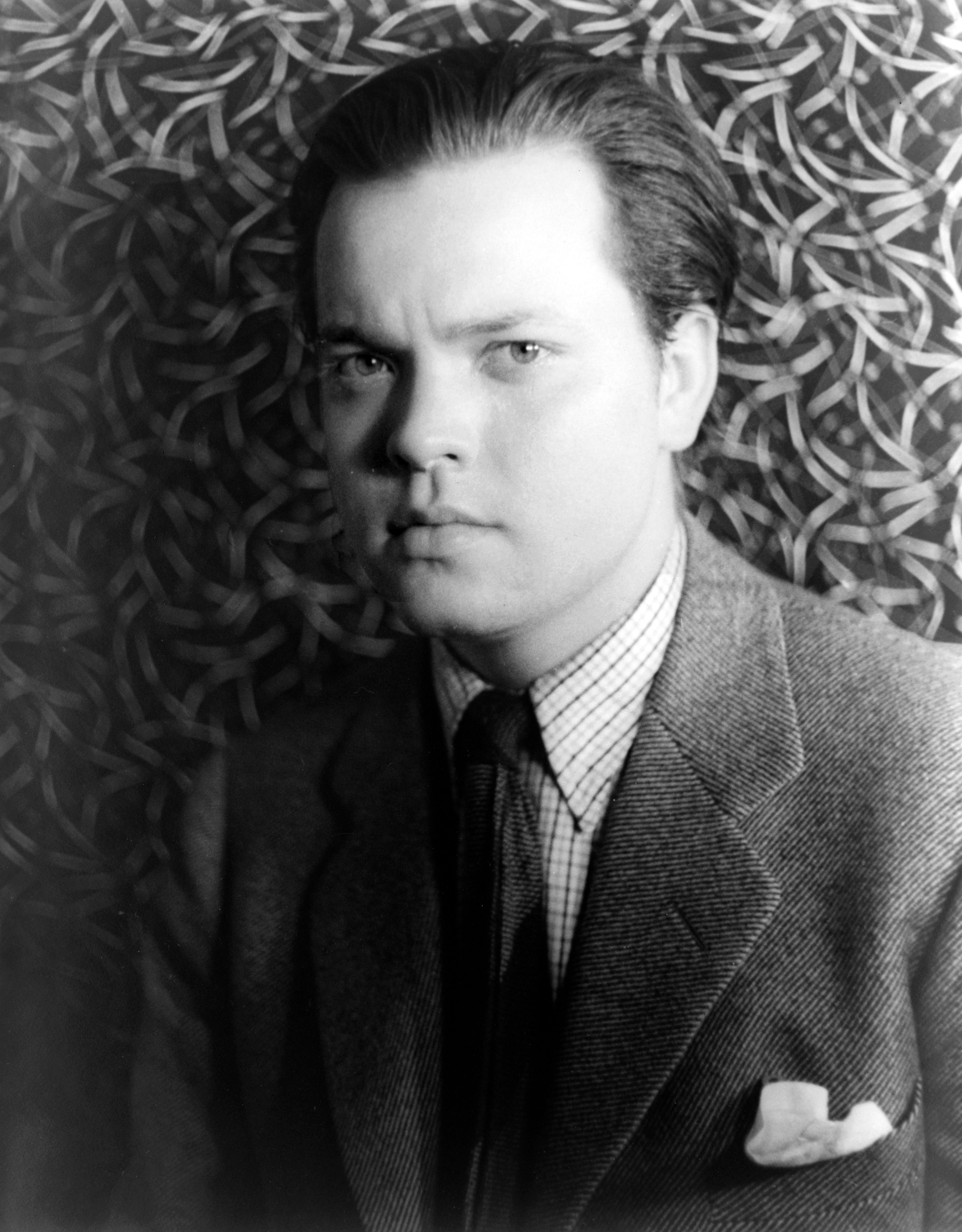
A speech in the episode was based on dialogue from 1949's The Third Man, starring Orson Welles.

The writers decided to kill off agent Pendrell in this episode. Actor Brendan Beiser portrayed the character in eight other episodes, first appearing in the third season episode "Nisei". Val Steffof, the assistant director of the filming crew, wanted a part, telling director Kim Manners "you know, I can act"; this led to Steffof being cast as a bartender. The song "Unmarked Helicopters" by Soul Coughing can be heard playing in Max Fenig's trailer; the song also appeared on the 1996 compilation album Songs in the Key of X: Music from and Inspired by the X-Files.

The very first scene was shot in a small tank across the street from North Shore Studios in Vancouver, British Columbia. Wide-angle lenses were used to film the scene as the actors did not actually have much room for swimming. This made it look like the actors are actually covering some ground, while in reality they only swam 10 to 12 feet (3.0 to 3.7 m). On the set of the following scene in which Fox Mulder reaches the shore, it was raining and very cold. Manners commented that the acting crew was more tired than usual because of it—during filming, Duchovny struggled to run from the actors playing his pursuers, but had previously been able to run from two horses when filming the episode "Tunguska".

It took several days to film the alien abduction scene. Internal shots of the airplane's cockpit were filmed in a real flight simulator, separate from the airplane set used for the rest of the interior shots. The exterior scenes were filmed at Vancouver International Airport. Executive producer John Shiban was asked to write a speech for Garrett in the scene in which Mulder encounters him on the airplane. Inspired by a speech given by Orson Welles in The Third Man, Shiban wrote the monologue as an homage to the film. The scenes of the airplane's final airborne moments included eighty extras who Manners felt were "eighty of the best extras I've ever worked with in my life". Several extras were as young as four years old, leading series creator Chris Carter to note that the scene would benefit from showing younger children, though these were represented by dolls as a safety precaution.

Max's abduction scene, in which the character is levitated through the door of an airplane, was achieved by pulling the actor out of the airplane rig with a harness; additional coverage was achieved by repeating this with a stuntman, who Scott Bellis notes was pulled out of the rig "a lot harder".

The beam of light seen shining from beneath the UFO in the episode was achieved by compositing several shots together, with elements including a crane carrying a spotlight—borrowed from the Canadian Coast Guard—and the spray from an aerosol combined to create the final shot.

== Broadcast and reception ==
"Max" premiered on the Fox network on March 23, 1997, and was first broadcast in the United Kingdom on BBC Two on January 21, 1998. The episode earned a Nielsen household rating of 11.6 with an 18 share, meaning that roughly 11.6 percent of all television-equipped households, and 18 percent of households watching television, were tuned in to the episode. A total of 18.34 million viewers watched this episode during its original airing.

The episode received mixed to positive reviews from critics. Emily VanDerWerff, writing for The A.V. Club, rated "Max" an A−. VanDerWerff was unconvinced that the episode, along with "Tempus Fugit", merited being stretched over two parts; however, she felt that the character of Fenig was "a simultaneous paean to the many, many lives lost in this fictional war and a very real story about someone who could very well live on the edges of our society, driven mad by visions that are only real to himself, visions the rest of us would immediately disregard as unbelievable and surreal". Paula Vitaris, writing for Cinefantastique, rated "Max" one-and-a-half stars out of four. Vitaris praised the episode's visual effects; however, she felt that the two parts of the story would have better served as "a taut one-hour episode". Vitaris also felt that the episode's final act, featuring Mulder on an airplane, saw Mulder uncharacteristically putting civilians at risk and was an example of "out and out bad writing". Robert Shearman, in his book Wanting to Believe: A Critical Guide to The X-Files, Millennium & The Lone Gunmen, rated the episode four stars out of five, describing it as "tightly, satisfying, witty and touching". Shearman noted that the second half of two-part episodes in the series tended to "drop the ball", but felt that the story arc of "Tempus Fugit" and "Max" was "very solid", calling them "the most satisfying "event" multi-parter that The X-Files has ever done".

== Bibliography ==
- Edwards, Ted (1996). X-Files Confidential. Little, Brown and Company. ISBN 0316218081.
- Hurwitz, Matt; Knowles, Chris (2008). The Complete X-Files. Insight Editions. ISBN 978-1933784809.
- Lovece, Frank (1996). The X-Files Declassified. Citadel Press. ISBN 080651745X.
- Lowry, Brian (1996). Trust No One: The Official Guide to the X-Files. Harper Prism. ISBN 0061053538.
- Meisler, Andy (1998). I Want to Believe: The Official Guide to the X-Files Volume 3. Harper Prism. ISBN 0061053864.
- Shearman, Robert (2009). Wanting to Believe: A Critical Guide to The X-Files, Millennium & The Lone Gunmen. Mad Norwegian Press. ISBN 978-0975944691.
