= List of The X-Files characters =

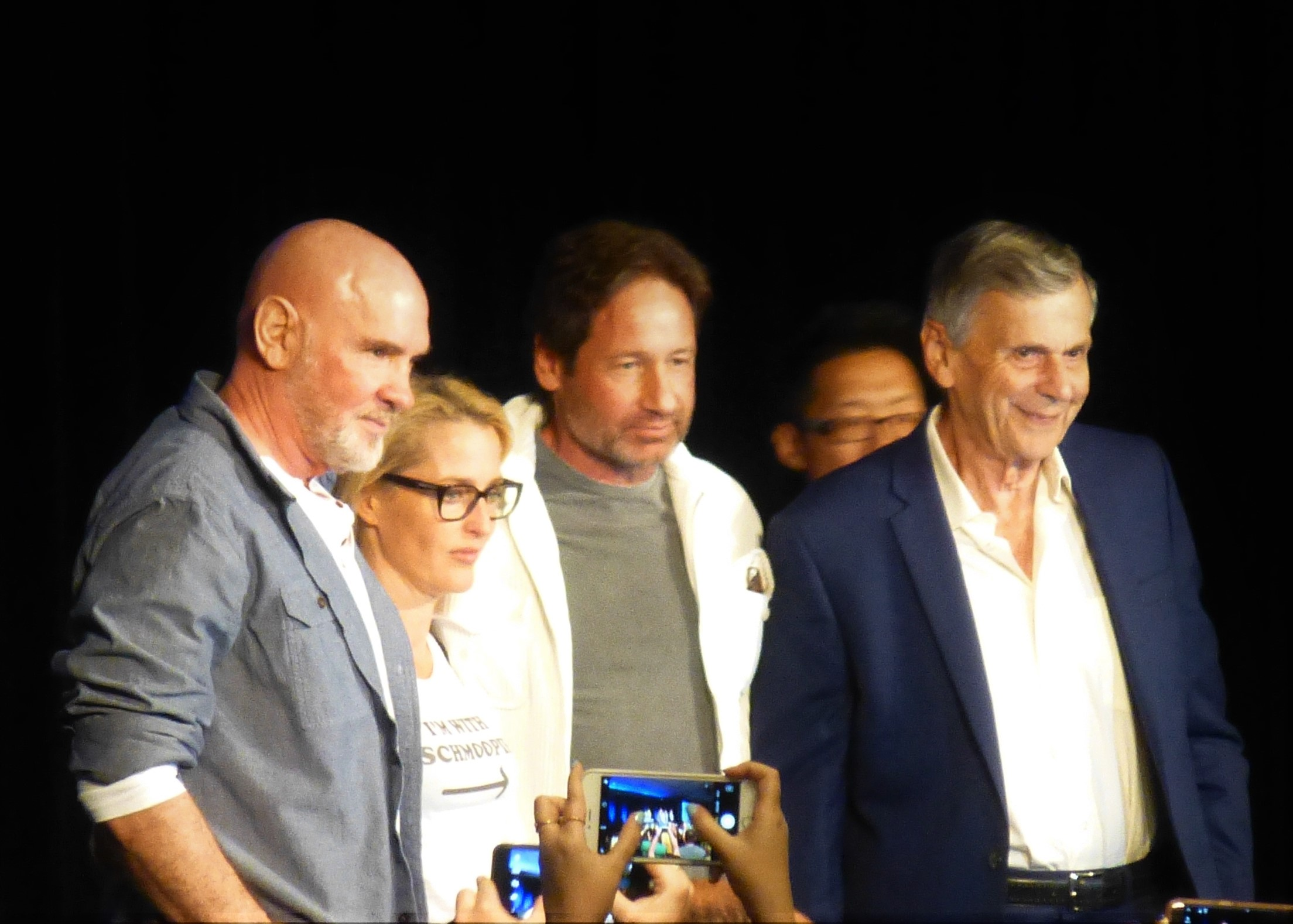
Main cast members (from left to right) Mitch Pileggi, Gillian Anderson, David Duchovny, and William B. Davis at the 2016 Chicago Wizard World

The X-Files is an American science fiction television series first broadcast in September 1993 and followed by two feature films: The X-Files and The X-Files: I Want to Believe. The characters defined the overarching mythology of the series. They appeared in a range of episodes across several seasons.

== Overview ==
The first seven seasons of The X-Files star Gillian Anderson as Dana Scully, a medical doctor and hard-line scientist assigned to work alongside Fox Mulder (David Duchovny), an esteemed FBI profiler who left his coveted position to head up a unit that investigates the paranormal and the unexplained. Tasked with debunking Mulder's work, Scully eventually comes to question her own faith, while Mulder continues to search through the archives of the Hoover building in order to find out what happened to his missing sister. The first seven seasons feature recurring appearances by Walter Skinner (Mitch Pileggi), conspiracy theorists The Lone Gunmen (Tom Braidwood, Dean Haglund, and Bruce Harwood), and secretive informants Deep Throat (The X-Files) (Jerry Hardin) and X (The X-Files) (Steven Williams).

The eighth season and the ninth season represent a change in the direction of the show: Duchovny departs the regular cast and thereafter takes the role of intermittent lead. Scully, now a reluctant believer, is partnered with Special Agent John Doggett (Robert Patrick), a former NYPD detective and a strict skeptic who is still grief-stricken over the death of his son, Luke. As Doggett begins to work on the X-files, Scully continues her search for Mulder, while also carrying his child. At the end of the eighth season, Scully departs the X-files, accept a teaching position at the FBI Academy. Thereafter she acts as only a consultant to Doggett. Annabeth Gish (as Monica Reyes), and Pileggi (as Skinner), join the main cast during the ninth season after recurring previously. The tenth season once again stars Duchovny, Anderson, and Pileggi, while Patrick is notably absent. Gish guest-stars in the finale as Reyes.

=== Starring ===
Character	Portrayed by	Seasons										
Character	Portrayed by	1	2	3	4	5	6	7	8	9	10	11
Fox Mulder	David Duchovny	Main (Note: In season 8, Duchovny is only credited in the twelve episodes in which he appears. In season 9, he appears in the finale only but is credited with the main cast.)	Main	Main	Main	Main	Main	Main	Main	Main	Main	Main
Dana Scully	Gillian Anderson	Main	Main	Main	Main	Main	Main	Main	Main	Main	Main	Main
John Doggett	Robert Patrick								Main	Main		
Monica Reyes	Annabeth Gish								Also starring	Main	Guest	Guest
Walter Skinner	Mitch Pileggi	Guest	Recurring	Also starring	Also starring	Also starring	Also starring	Also starring	Also starring	Main (Note: Pileggi is only credited in the episodes he appears in.)	Main	Main

=== Also starring ===
Character	Portrayed by	Seasons										
Character	Portrayed by	1	2	3	4	5	6	7	8	9	10	11
Cigarette Smoking Man	William B. Davis	Recurring	Recurring	Recurring	Also starring	Also starring	Also starring	Also starring		Also starring	Recurring	Recurring
Alex Krycek	Nicholas Lea		Recurring	Recurring	Guest	Also starring	Also starring	Also starring	Also starring	Also starring		
Jeffrey Spender	Chris Owens					Recurring	Also starring			Guest		Guest
Alvin Kersh	James Pickens, Jr.						Recurring		Recurring	Also starring		Guest

=== Recurring ===
Character	Portrayed by	Seasons										
Character	Portrayed by	1	2	3	4	5	6	7	8	9	10	11
Deep Throat	Jerry Hardin	Recurring		Guest	Guest			Guest				
X	Steven Williams		Recurring	Recurring	Guest	Guest				Guest		
John Fitzgerald Byers	Bruce Harwood	Guest	Recurring	Recurring	Guest	Recurring	Recurring	Recurring	Recurring	Recurring	Guest	
Richard 'Ringo' Langly	Dean Haglund	Guest	Recurring	Recurring	Guest	Recurring	Recurring	Recurring	Recurring	Recurring	Guest	Guest
Melvin Frohike	Tom Braidwood	Guest	Recurring	Recurring	Recurring	Recurring	Recurring	Recurring	Recurring	Recurring	Guest	
William Mulder	Peter Donat		Recurring	Guest				Guest				
Margaret Scully	Sheila Larken	Guest	Guest	Recurring	Guest	Recurring			Recurring	Guest	Guest	
Well-Manicured Man	John Neville			Recurring	Guest	Recurring						
Teena Mulder	Rebecca Toolan		Guest	Recurring	Recurring			Recurring				
First Elder	Don S. Williams			Recurring	Guest	Recurring	Recurring					
Luis Cardinal/Hispanic Man	Lenno Britos			Recurring								
Pendrell	Brendan Beiser			Recurring	Recurring							
Marita Covarrubias	Laurie Holden				Recurring	Guest	Guest	Guest		Guest		
Gray Haired Man	Morris Panych			Guest	Recurring							
Bill Scully Jr.	Pat Skipper				Guest	Recurring						
Third Elder	John Moore			Guest	Guest	Recurring						
Diana Fowley	Mimi Rogers					Guest	Recurring	Guest				
Morris Fletcher	Michael McKean						Recurring			Guest		
Gene Crane	Kirk B.R. Woller								Recurring			
Knowle Rohrer	Adam Baldwin								Recurring	Guest		
Billy Miles	Zachary Ansley	Guest						Guest	Recurring			
Brad Follmer	Cary Elwes									Recurring		
Jackson Van De Kamp/William Scully	Miles Robbins (Note: In seasons 8, 9 and 10, the character is portrayed by various infant and child actors.)								Guest	Recurring	Guest	Recurring
Toothpick Man	Alan Dale									Recurring		
Erika Price	Barbara Hershey											Recurring

=== Notable Guests ===
Character	Portrayed by	Seasons										
Character	Portrayed by	1	2	3	4	5	6	7	8	9	10	11
Scott Blevins	Charles Cioffi	Guest			Guest	Guest						
Theresa Hoese	Sarah Koskoff	Guest						Guest	Guest			
Max Fenig	Scott Bellis	Guest			Guest							
Richard Matheson	Raymond J. Barry		Guest	Guest			Guest					
Melissa Scully	Melinda McGraw		Guest	Guest		Guest						
Alien Bounty Hunter	Brian Thompson		Guest	Guest	Guest	Guest	Guest	Guest	Guest			
Dr. Charles Burks	Bill Dow		Guest		Guest		Guest	Guest	Guest			
Albert Hosteen	Floyd 'Red Crow' Westerman		Guest	Guest			Guest	Guest				
Jeremiah Smith	Roy Thinnes			Guest	Guest				Guest			
Michael Kritschgau	John Finn				Guest	Guest		Guest				
Susanne Modeski	Signy Coleman					Guest	Guest					
Cassandra Spender	Veronica Cartwright					Guest	Guest					
Second Elder	George Murdock					Guest	Guest					
Arthur Dales	Fredric Lehne/Darren McGavin					Guest	Guest					
Gibson Andrew Praise	Jeff Gulka					Guest	Guest		Guest	Guest		
Ted O'Malley	Joel McHale										Guest	Guest
Einstein	Lauren Ambrose										Guest	Guest
Miller	Robbie Amell										Guest	Guest

== Main cast and characters ==
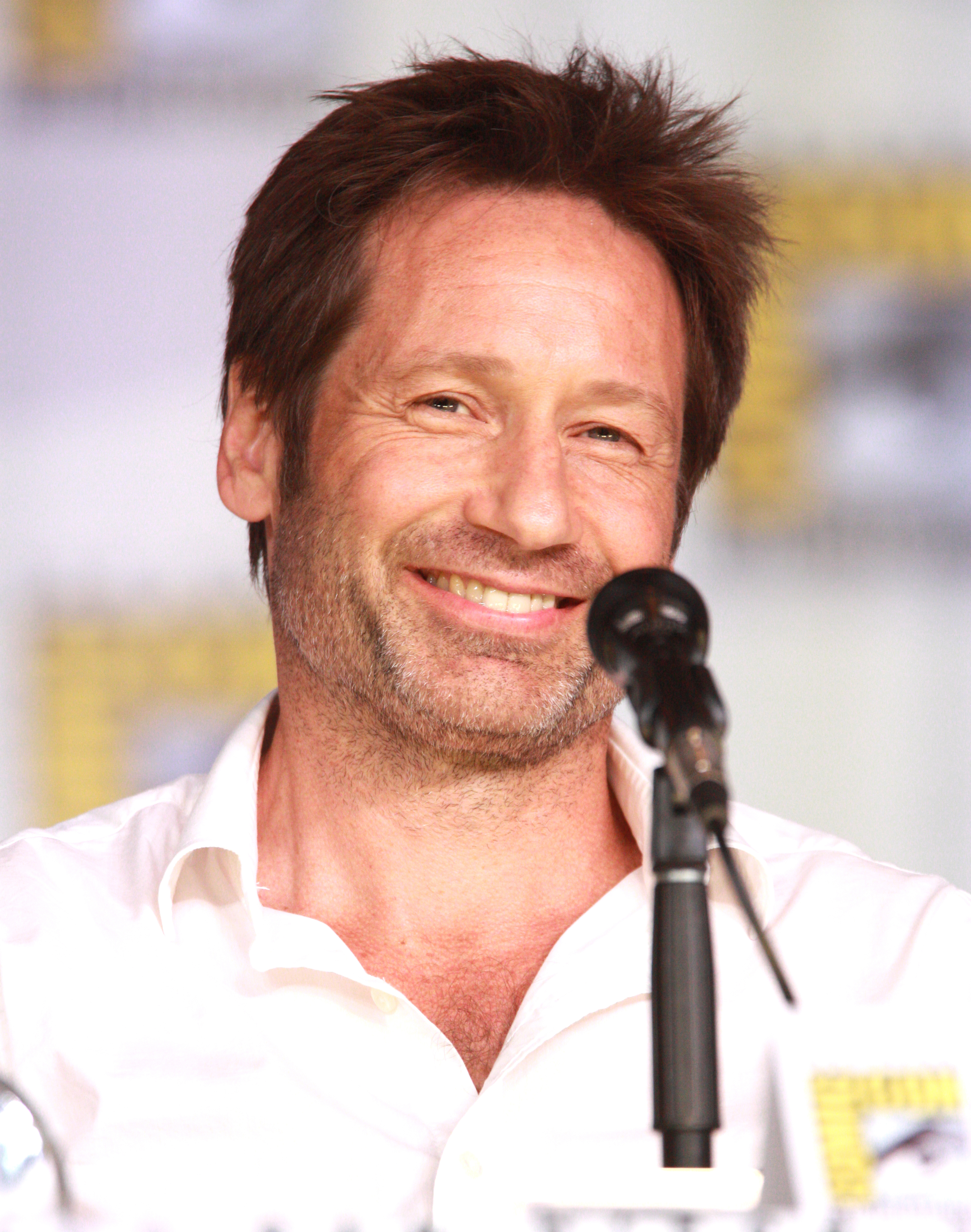
David Duchovny

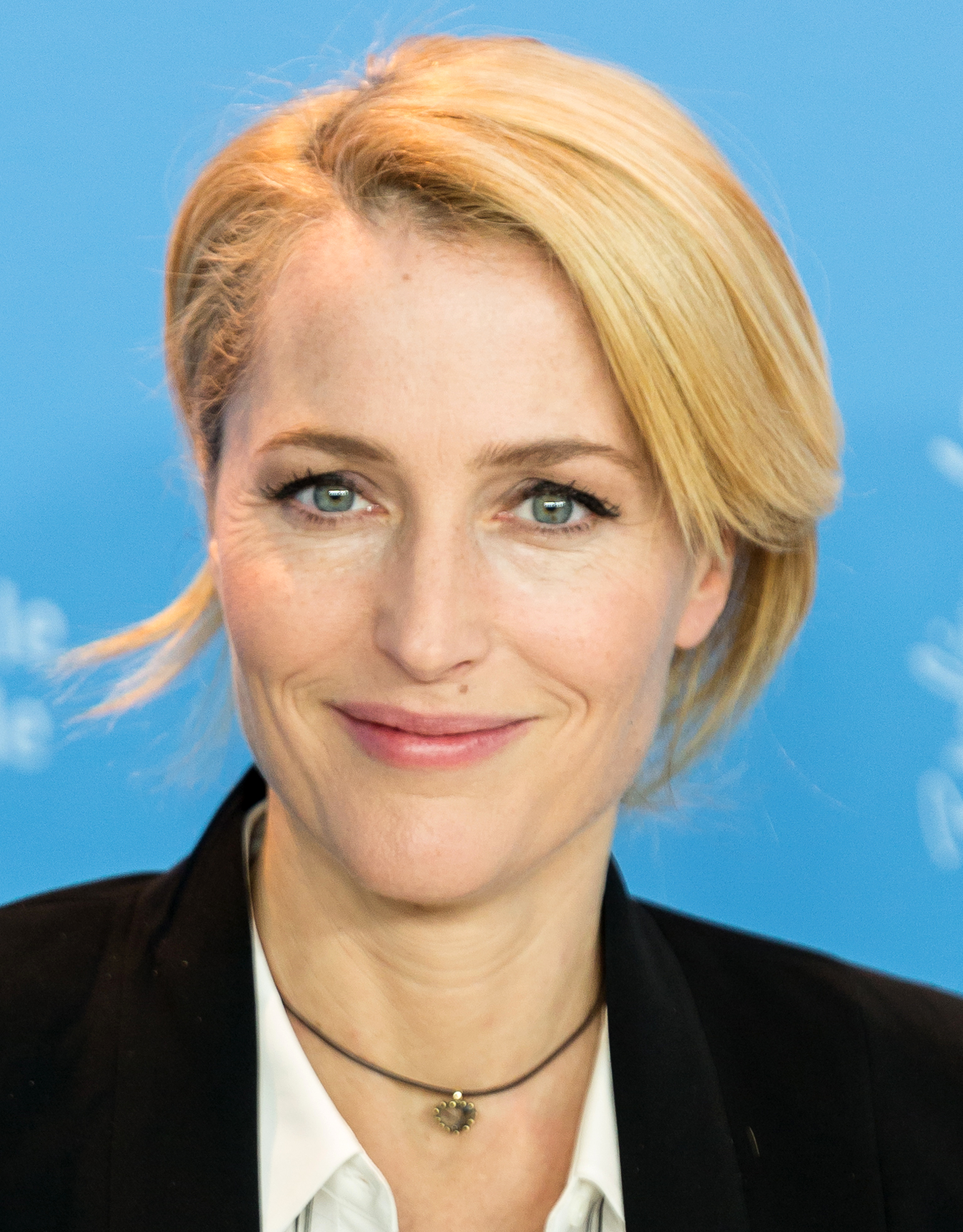
Gillian Anderson stars in all eleven seasons of The X-Files as Dana Scully.

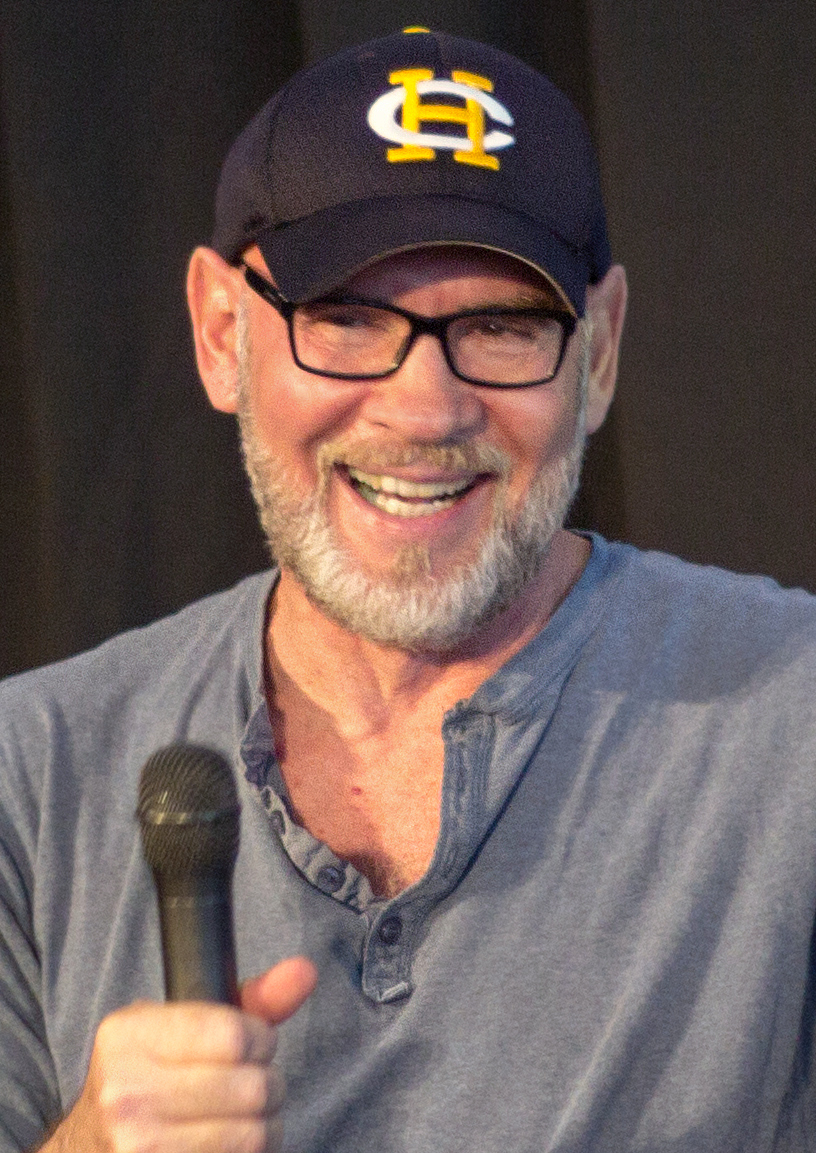
Mitch Pileggi stars in all eleven seasons of The X-Files as Walter Skinner.

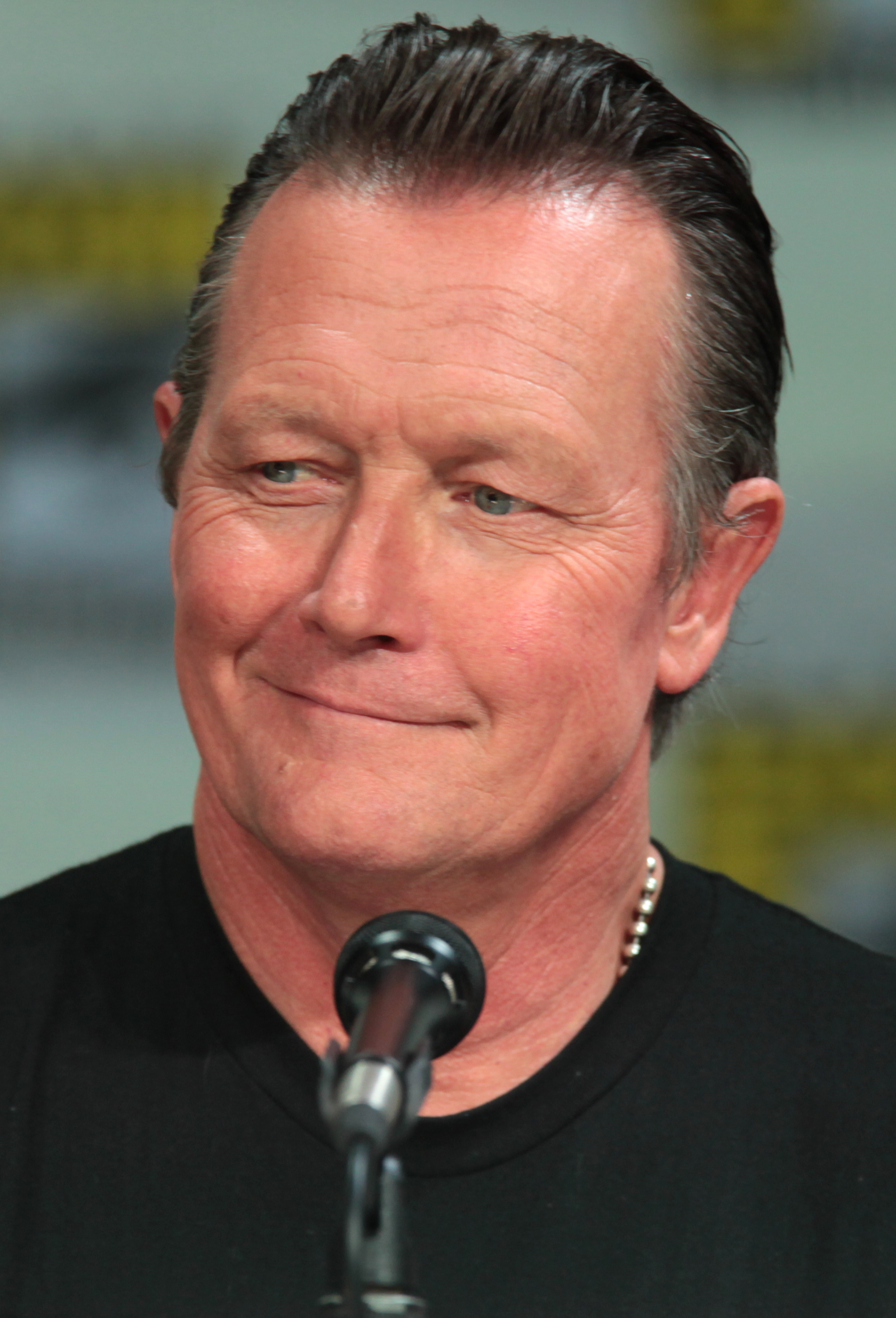
Robert Patrick stars in the eighth and ninth seasons of The X-Files as John Doggett.

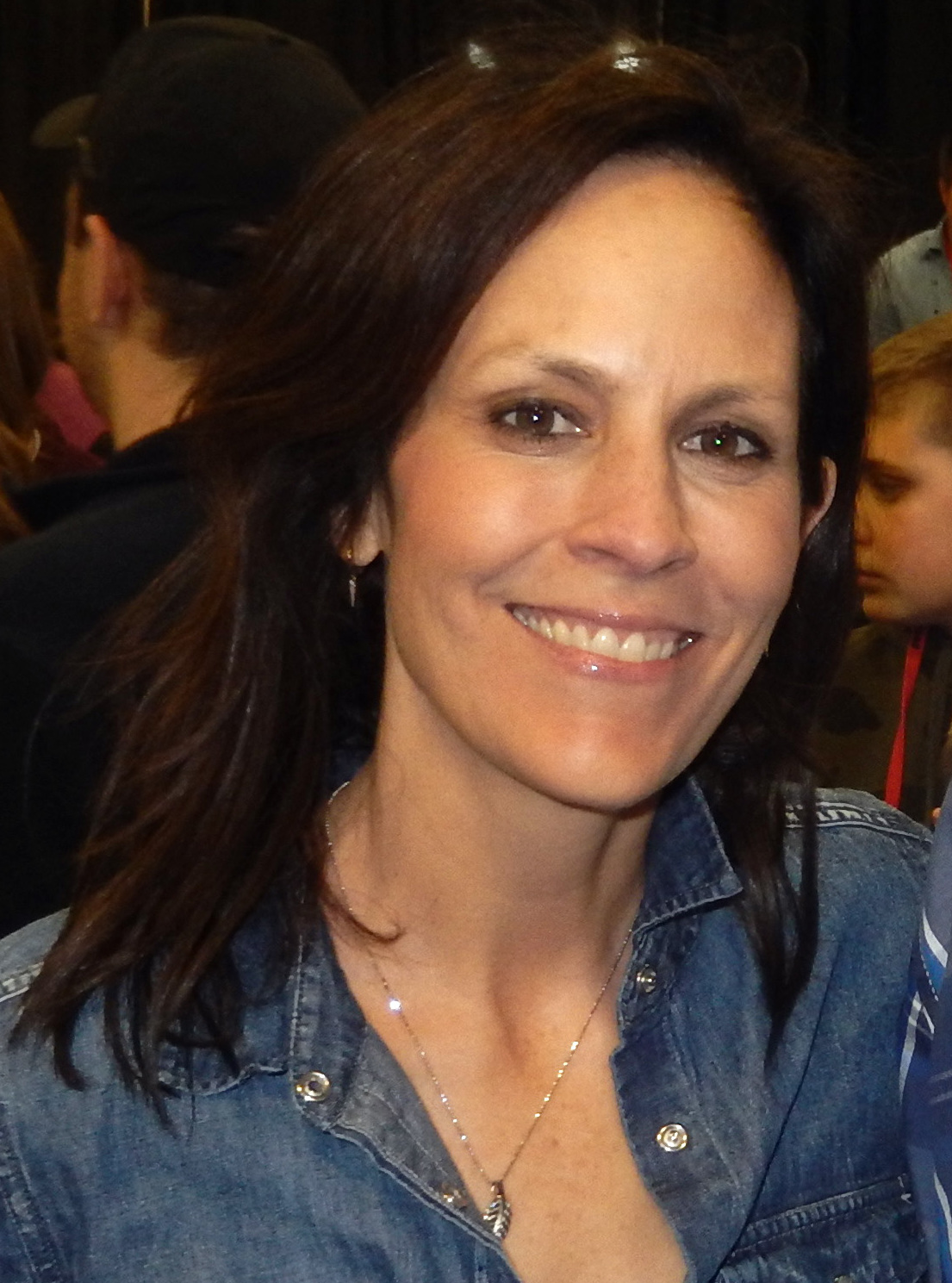
Annabeth Gish stars in the eighth, ninth, tenth and eleventh seasons of The X-Files as Monica Reyes.

=== Fox Mulder ===
Fox William Mulder is played by David Duchovny, a trained FBI profiler who believes in the existence of extraterrestrial visitors and a government conspiracy to hide or deny the truth regarding extraterrestrial life. Mulder and his partner Special Agent Dana Scully work in the FBI's X-files office, which is concerned with cases with particularly mysterious or possibly supernatural circumstances that were marked as unsolvable and shelved by the FBI. Mulder considers the X-files and the truth behind the supposed conspiracy so important that he has made their study the main purpose of his life. After seven years partnered with Scully, Mulder is abducted by aliens at the end of the seventh season. Upon returning, he officially hands the X-files to Special Agent John Doggett, who was hired in his absence. Mulder returns to assist the FBI in 2008, and permanently rejoins the bureau in 2016. He and Scully have a son together, named William.

=== Dana Scully ===
Dana Katherine Scully is played by Gillian Anderson, a medical doctor assigned to debunk the work of Special Agent Fox Mulder. Together they work out of a cramped basement office at the FBI headquarters in Washington, D.C., to investigate unsolved cases labeled "X-files". In contrast to Fox Mulder's "believer" character, Scully was a "skeptic", basing her beliefs solely on what science can prove. However, as the series progresses she becomes more open to the possibility of paranormal happenings. After Mulder is abducted by aliens, the eighth season sees the assignment of a new partner to Scully: Special Agent John Doggett. Later in the same season, she leaves the X-files office to teach at the FBI Academy. Scully departs from the FBI permanently in 2002. Sometime between then and 2008 she finds work as a surgeon. In 2008 she returns to consult with the FBI. She returns to the bureau permanently in 2016 alongside Mulder.

=== John Doggett ===
John Doggett is played by Robert Patrick, an FBI special agent who makes his first appearance in "Within," the eighth-season premiere. Doggett served in the United States Marine Corps during the 1970s and the 1980s. Later he joined the New York City Police Department and was eventually promoted to the rank of detective. After his son's death, Doggett took a job in the FBI working in the Criminal Investigations Division. In 2000 Deputy Director Alvin Kersh assigned him to the X-files office as Scully's partner after an unsuccessful task force attempt to find a missing Mulder in "Without". He grows to rely on Scully's friendship, even though he knows he can never replace Mulder. He is later partnered with Monica Reyes, and together they depart the X-files in 2002, when the unit is shut down.

=== Monica Reyes ===
Monica Reyes is played by Annabeth Gish, an FBI special agent who was born and raised in Mexico City, where her parents still reside as of 2002. Because she was raised in Mexico, Reyes speaks fluent Spanish. She majored in folklore and mythology at Brown University, and has a master's degree in Religious Studies. In 1990, Reyes enrolled in the FBI at Quantico, Virginia. Her first assignment in the FBI was serving on a special task force investigating satanic rituals. She is a longtime friend of Doggett's and serves as his partner on the X-files after Scully's departure. Shortly after the closure of the X-files in 2002 she was contacted by the Cigarette Smoking Man who offered to secure her a place among the designated survivors of end-times, in exchange for her assistance. Reyes departed the FBI shortly thereafter, electing to take Spender's offer but with the intent on halting the invasion from within the syndicate.

=== Walter Skinner ===
FBI assistant director Walter S. Skinner is played by Mitch Pileggi. He served in the United States Marine Corps during the Vietnam War. During this time he shot and killed a young boy carrying explosives, an episode which scarred him for life. Skinner is originally the direct supervisor of Mulder and Scully, and of the X-files. He later serves the same position for Special Agents John Doggett and Monica Reyes. Although he is originally portrayed as a somewhat malevolent character, Skinner eventually becomes a close friend of his subordinates. Skinner is responsible for the reopening of the X-files in 2016.

== Federal Bureau of Investigation characters ==
=== Brad Follmer ===
Brad D. Follmer is portrayed by Cary Elwes. Follmer was an assistant director at the FBI. He had a romantic history with Monica Reyes that he brought up while trying to keep her away from the X-files. His true motives were more political in nature and part of his sycophancy to Alvin Kersh. He did not believe in the X-files and deliberately showed disrespect to John Doggett by calling him "Mr. Doggett" instead of "Agent".

In 2002, new evidence concerning the murder of Luke Doggett came to light. John Doggett sought Follmer's assistance because he had worked on organized crime in New York City before coming to Washington. Reyes, however, recalled seeing Follmer accept a bribe from a mobster. Although he had convincingly claimed he was only paying an informant, the truth was as Reyes suspected: Follmer was crooked. Once the truth of Luke's fate was revealed, Follmer shot and killed the mobster who had nevertheless threatened to blackmail him concerning his bribe acceptance. Follmer's future at the FBI was left unresolved, although he would have likely faced criminal charges for his actions.

=== Diana Fowley ===
Diana Fowley is an FBI agent played by Mimi Rogers and first appeared in the fifth-season finale "The End". In keeping with the show's history of ambiguity, Fowley's motivations were never explained, although many viewers assumed her to be deeply associated with the Syndicate conspirators and working against Mulder in his pursuit of the truth within the X-files. As Fowley is an old fling of Mulder's, additional tension was generated on the show and among viewers because of a perceived rekindling of her former close personal relationship with agent Mulder and the possibility of Fowley coming between him and his trusted partner, Special Agent Dana Scully.

The character of Diana Fowley subsequently vanishes during "The Sixth Extinction II: Amor Fati". Her absence is explained by Scully, who states, "Diana Fowley was found murdered this morning." Her death is not witnessed, though.

=== Alvin Kersh ===
Deputy Director Alvin D. Kersh is played by James Pickens, Jr. Kersh was a Navy A-6 Intruder weapons officer during the Vietnam War. He is known for using the same instincts that served him as an aviator in the military to guide his career in the FBI. His role in the series is primarily that of a foil to Mulder, Scully and Doggett, constantly trying to undermine and get in the way of their work in the belief of his own superiority.

As an assistant director, he temporarily became supervisor to Agents Fox Mulder and Dana Scully when they were assigned away from the X-Files unit. During this time, the Cigarette Smoking Man could be seen in his office, reminiscent of his silent presence in Walter Skinner's office in earlier seasons. Kersh assigned Mulder and Scully mostly to menial tasks, such as terrorist details and Federal background checks. When they did investigate an X-File behind his back, Kersh would charge them for expenses they incurred on the case, forcing them to pay out of their own pocket. He also attempted to separate Mulder and Scully, believing that Mulder threw away a promising career as a criminal profiler, but that Scully's career could still be saved.

When Mulder and Scully were reassigned to the X-Files Section, Kersh continued to climb the ladder, culminating in an assignment as deputy director. It was not long after his promotion that Mulder was abducted by aliens. Kersh assigned John Doggett to run the manhunt for Mulder. When Mulder returned, Kersh refused to assign him to the X-Files, keeping Doggett in that position. When Mulder and Doggett pursued an unauthorized case, Kersh was prepared to fire them both, but Mulder accepted full responsibility and was dismissed from the FBI. Shortly thereafter, Mulder disappeared again, and Doggett brought in Monica Reyes to help him investigate Kersh's involvement in the conspiracy surrounding Mulder's disappearance. The investigation turned up nothing. Although Doggett seemed convinced that Kersh was involved in the conspiracy, Kersh insisted that he was actually protecting Mulder.

During the ninth season, the Toothpick Man, a key conspirator, could be seen in the company of Kersh, much like Cigarette Smoking Man before. In the end, Kersh showed a heroic side when during the season finale, he helped Doggett and Skinner free Mulder from a military prison. Following this, Kersh had to permanently close the X-Files to appease his irate superiors. The X-Files are still officially closed when Mulder consults with the FBI 6 years later when FBI Agent Monica Bannon goes missing, however, Kersh is noticeably absent.

=== Jeffrey Spender ===
Jeffrey Frank Spender is portrayed by Chris Owens. Spender was a skeptic who was assigned to The X-Files after Fox Mulder's forced leave. Spender is the son of the Cigarette Smoking Man (also known as C. G. B. Spender, or CSM) and his ex-wife, multiple abductee Cassandra Spender. Heavily involved in the Syndicate at that time, CSM abandoned the family when Spender was 12 years old. Subsequently, his mother was driven insane by what she claims were multiple alien abductions. Shortly after Samantha Mulder was abducted and then returned, Jeffrey and Samantha were raised together by his father in California. Spender met Agents Fox Mulder and Dana Scully in 1998. That same year CSM began sending him letters, however Spender would return them unopened. After his father set fire to the X-Files in "The End," Spender and Agent Diana Fowley start working on the X-Files. Spender receives orders from CSM to push for Mulder and Scully to be dismissed from the FBI, which he eventually does in "Two Fathers". Later on he reinstates Mulder and Scully to the X-files but appears to be shot in the head and killed by his father in "One Son".

Three years later, it is revealed in "William" that Spender survived the gunshot, but that he was subjected to horribly disfiguring experiments at the hands of his father. Posing as Mulder, he infiltrates Scully's house and injects William with a magnetite substance to seemingly "cure" the baby of his telekinetic powers. The motivation or repercussions of his actions are never fully explained. He testifies for the defense during Mulder's murder trial in "The Truth" where he reveals that Teena Mulder had an affair with CSM, and that he and Fox Mulder are half-brothers. A DNA test conducted on a disfigured Spender in the episode "William" initially leads agents Scully, Doggett, and Reyes to believe he is Fox Mulder, thus lending further credence to Spender's claim that both he and Mulder are the children of the Cigarette-Smoking Man.

== The Lone Gunmen ==
=== John Fitzgerald Byers ===
John Fitzgerald Byers is portrayed by Bruce Harwood. Byers was born in Sterling, Virginia on November 22, 1963, the day on which John F. Kennedy was assassinated, and was named after the fallen president—his parents were originally planning to name him Bertram, after his father. Byers idolized his namesake, but always had suspicions about the real cause of his death.

Byers worked as a public affairs officer for the Federal Communications Commission (FCC) in Baltimore until May 1989. At that time he met Susanne Modeski at a consumer electronics show in Baltimore and instantly fell in love with her. Initially lying about her identity to him, she revealed herself to be a scientist working for the Army Advanced Weapons facility and appealed to him for help in stopping one of her developments—a gas causing fear and paranoia—from being used by the military on innocent civilians. Enlisting the help of Melvin Frohike and Richard Langly, who were also at the electronics show, they succeeded in helping Modeski, although she was later kidnapped. Modeski had awakened a desire in all three of them to uncover the truth, which subsequently led to the formation and publication of a newsletter entitled The Lone Gunmen, providing information on government cover-ups and conspiracy theories.

Byers appears to have some working knowledge of medicine, genetics, and chemistry; he is able to interpret DNA strands, instantly informing Mulder that Scully's blood had been tampered with in "One Breath". All three of the Lone Gunmen die in the episode "Jump the Shark," sacrificing themselves to save thousands from a terrorist created plague. Skinner arranges for them to be interred at Arlington National Cemetery, as a tribute to their brave deeds.

=== Melvin Frohike ===
Melvin Frohike is portrayed by Tom Braidwood. Frohike was born circa 1953 in Pontiac, Michigan. Prior to joining The Lone Gunmen, he was an acclaimed tango dancer in Miami (under the stage name "El Lobo"). On giving up the tango, he toured the country with hippies before founding Frohike Electronics Corp., specializing in cable intrusion hardware.

In 1989 at a consumer electronics show in Baltimore, where his company had a trade stand, he met John Fitzgerald Byers and Richard Langly and they subsequently formed a group publishing The Lone Gunmen newsletter. Frohike has a deep attraction for Dana Scully. In his first appearance he was taking photographs of Scully, ogling her and calling her “hot”. Whilst this attraction seemed rather lustful at first, he has shown genuine affection for Scully (and Fox Mulder) on numerous occasions, being the first person to bring her flowers after she returned from her abduction in the episode "One Breath". All three of the Lone Gunmen die in the X-Files episode "Jump the Shark". They intentionally lock themselves in a closed hallway with a man carrying a terrorist-created plague, saving thousands. Skinner arranges for them to be interred at Arlington National Cemetery, as a tribute to their brave deeds.

=== Richard Langly ===
Richard “Ringo” Langly is portrayed by Dean Haglund. Langly was born circa 1968/69 in Saltville, Nebraska. He showed an aptitude for computers from an early age, which was frowned upon by his parents. In 1989 he met Melvin Frohike and John Fitzgerald Byers at a consumer electronics show in Baltimore, and they subsequently formed a group publishing The Lone Gunman newsletter. Langly wears thick black-rimmed glasses, heavy metal and punk T-shirts (favoring the Ramones in particular) and jeans. He has long blonde hair (which sometimes leads to him being mistaken for a girl) and bears a striking resemblance to Garth Algar from Wayne's World. He idolizes Joey Ramone in particular.

Of the Lone Gunmen, Langly is an expert in computers, hacking, and programming. He is likely the most paranoid of the Gunmen, taping all incoming phone calls, including those from Fox Mulder. All three of the Lone Gunmen died in the X-Files episode "Jump the Shark," sacrificing themselves to save thousands from a terrorist-created plague by using fire doors to seal themselves in a closed hallway with the man carrying the plague. Skinner arranges for them to be interred at Arlington National Cemetery, as a tribute to their brave deeds.

== Syndicate characters ==
=== Marita Covarrubias ===
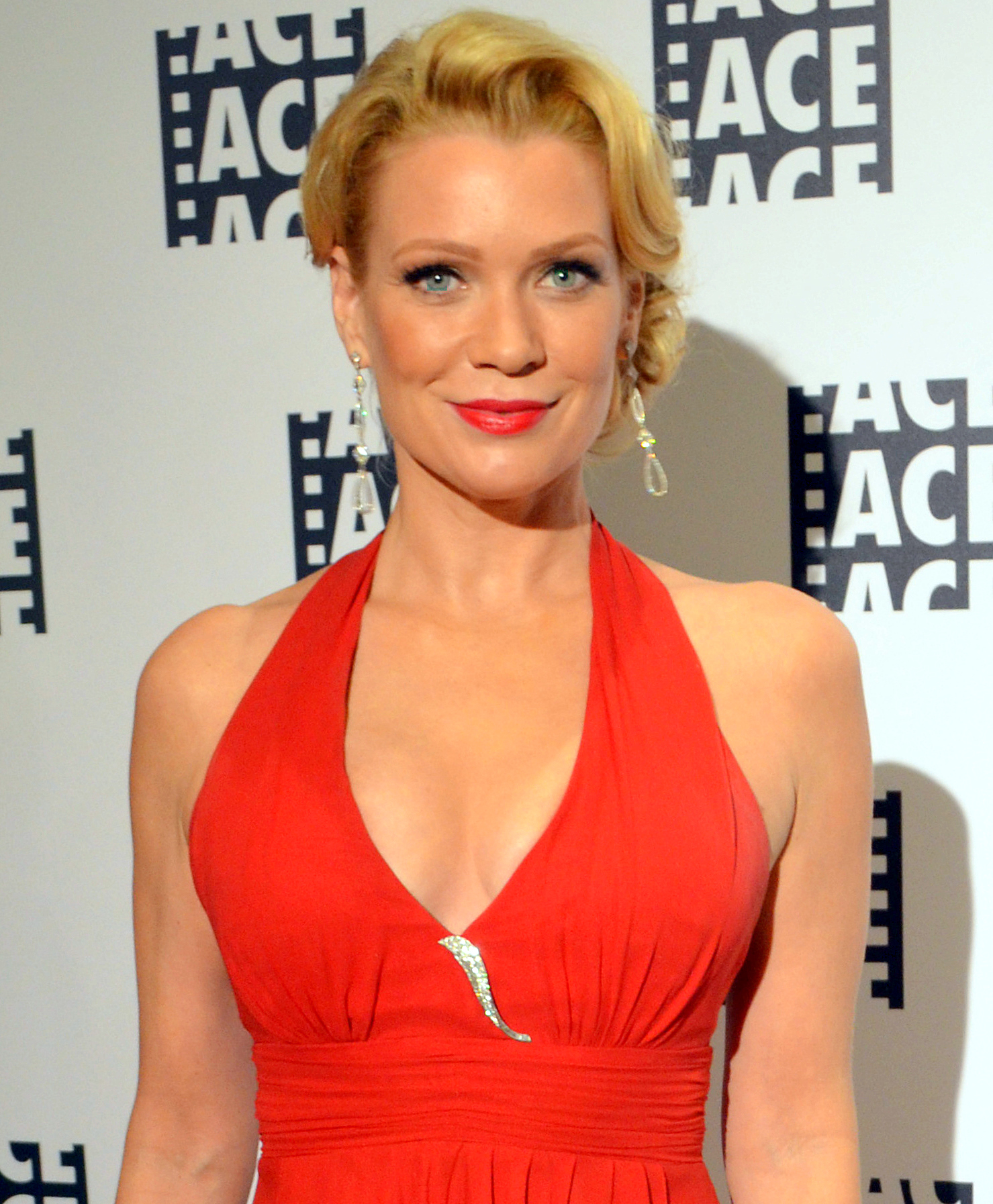
Laurie Holden portrayed Covarrubias in all appearances of the character.

Marita Covarrubias is introduced as an informant to Mulder after the death of his former source, X. X scrawls the letters "S.R.S.G." in his own blood as he dies, leading Mulder to the Special Representative to the Secretary-General of the United Nations. However, it is later revealed that Covarrubias is working for the Smoking Man and the Syndicate. The Syndicate later discovers that Covarrubias has betrayed them and is providing information to Mulder. As a result, Syndicate scientists infect her with the black oil virus, so as to test a vaccine they have been working to create. A cured Covarrubias later makes contact with Krycek at the behest of The Smoking Man, who wishes to resume the work of the now-eradicated Syndicate. However, Covarrubias and Krycek betray the Smoking Man and leave him for dead. In the series finale "The Truth," Skinner seeks Covarrubias as a witness in Mulder's trial for murder. She is called upon to testify, and she speaks about her involvement with the Syndicate. However, when she is pressed for further information about the continuation of the conspiracy, she clams up, and at Mulder's request she is dismissed from the stand, for fear that if she divulges certain knowledge, she will be killed.

The character of Marita Covarrubias was portrayed by Laurie Holden in all her appearances. When auditioning for the role, Holden was not allowed access to an episode script, instead simply being told that her character worked for the United Nations and had an air of "intelligent seriousness". Writer Frank Spotnitz has described Covarrubias as "young, attractive, vital [and] dangerous" compared to the other characters working for the Syndicate. Holden has compared the character to Mata Hari, adding that "you can't really read what she's saying or what her intentions are". Robert Shearman and Lars Pearson, in their book Wanting to Believe: A Critical Guide to The X-Files, Millennium & The Lone Gunmen, felt that the character was "used so perfunctorily since her introduction" that her appearances added little to the episodes she featured in, describing her as a "bad parody" of the earlier characters Deep Throat and X.

=== Deep Throat ===
Deep Throat is the first of Mulder's informants, leaking information to him to aid his investigations. As a member of the then-unseen Syndicate, he is in a position to know a great deal of information. Deep Throat feels that the truth being kept secret from the public by the Syndicate needs to be known. He believes Mulder to be the one person capable of exposing this knowledge. However, he believes that there are certain truths that the public are not yet ready to know. In "The Erlenmeyer Flask," the finale of the first season, Mulder is taken hostage following his investigation into an alien-human hybridization program. Fearing for Mulder's life, Deep Throat helps Scully to gain access to a high-containment facility, where she manages to secretly remove an alien fetus for use as collateral in saving Mulder. In the subsequent meeting between the operatives and Deep Throat, he is shot and killed. The character later appears in dreams and visions experienced by Mulder during his recuperation on a Navajo reservation, and again years later while being experimented on by the Smoking Man.

Deep Throat was inspired by the historical Deep Throat, FBI Associate Director Mark Felt. Also cited as an influence on the fictional Deep Throat was X, the character portrayed by Donald Sutherland in the 1991 Oliver Stone film JFK. The character was intended to bridge the gap between Mulder and Scully and the shadowy conspirators who were working against them; and was conceived as someone "who works in some level of government that we have no idea exists". Jerry Hardin was cast as Deep Throat based on his role in 1993's The Firm. Hardin's performance has been cited as "the spine of the series", and his portrayal of the character has been met with positive reviews from critics.

=== First Elder ===
The First Elder is portrayed by Don S. Williams. He was a high-ranking member of the Syndicate. His exact position in the Syndicate was unclear, especially in regard to the Well-Manicured Man, though at times he seemed higher-ranking than the Smoking Man. He contacted Scully in person while Mulder pursued evidence of an alien autopsy on a train. He also obtained photographs taken by X of a meeting between The Smoking Man and Teena Mulder as proof that one of the Smoking Man's henchmen was a traitor. The First Elder set up a trap to reveal the identity of the traitor and dispatched an assassin to kill him. X fell for the trap and was executed.

After Mulder shot Department of Defense agent Scott Ostlehoff in his head to obscure his identity, Mulder and Scully used the situation to effectively fake Mulder's death. CSM spoke with the First Elder at a horse track about Mulder's death, which CSM saw as unfortunate and unhelpful. However, the fact that Mulder was alive soon became known to both men, upon which the First Elder ordered one of his operatives to carry out a specific task. The operative followed CSM as he tried to recruit Mulder to work with the Syndicate, watching their movements through the scope of a sniper rifle. Shortly after the discovery of Scott Blevins' betrayal, the First Elder's operative shot CSM, who had been holding a photograph of Mulder and his sister.

He was killed along with the rest of the Syndicate by a group of Alien rebels in 1999.

=== Alex Krycek ===
Alex Krycek is portrayed by Nicholas Lea. Krycek is a Russian-American who makes his first appearance in "Sleepless", where Krycek, a young FBI special agent, is assigned as a temporary investigation partner to Fox Mulder. Krycek proceeds to work with Mulder and attempts to gain his trust.

However, it later becomes evident that Krycek is actually an undercover agent working for the Cigarette Smoking Man. Krycek plays an important part in several events that are harmful to Mulder and Dana Scully: he assists in Scully's abduction, and murders Mulder's father, Bill Mulder. Krycek also assaults Assistant Director Walter Skinner and acquires a secret tape from him which reveals a US government coverup regarding alien visits to Earth. After a botched murder attempt on Scully results in the death of her sister, the Cigarette Smoking Man attempts to kill Krycek with a car bomb, but Krycek escapes. He lies low in Hong Kong for a short period, selling secrets acquired from the tape until he is found, beaten and apprehended by Mulder who takes him back to the US. Unbeknown to him, Krycek is under the control of an alien organism and he escapes Mulder before he is taken to a missile silo in North Dakota by the Cigarette Smoking Man. Having ejected the alien influence into an alien craft, he is left locked in a missile bay, screaming and banging on the door.

When escaping a gulag in Russia, where Krycek pursues a mysterious rock, his left arm is amputated to prevent some experiments on him. Later in the series, Krycek can be seen switching sides as it suits him, occasionally helping Mulder, Cigarette Smoking Man and other people. He attempted to blackmail Skinner by infecting him with lethal nanotechnology, but ended up being thrown into a Tunisian prison when the Cigarette Smoking Man discovered that Krycek had stolen an alien artifact from him. In the last season 7 episode, "Requiem", Krycek apparently kills the Cigarette Smoking Man by pushing him down a flight of stairs. Later, when Mulder was abducted by aliens and returned in a deathlike state, Krycek attempts to again blackmail Skinner, offering the means to save Mulder's life in exchange for Scully's baby. Skinner refuses, and Krycek has a violent confrontation with John Doggett before escaping. In the last season 8 episode, "Existence", Krycek is shot between the eyes and killed by Skinner during an unsuccessful attempt to kill Mulder. Krycek's ghost briefly showed up to help Mulder escape a military base in the series finale.

=== Knowle Rohrer ===
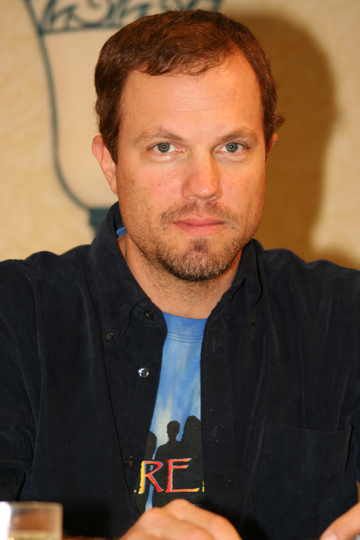
Adam Baldwin, who played the super soldier Knowle Rohrer

Knowle Rohrer is portrayed by Adam Baldwin. He served alongside Sergeant John Doggett in the U.S. Marine Corps with the 24th Marine Amphibious Unit in Beirut, Lebanon. Doggett and Rohrer were friends, but lost touch when Rohrer and Shannon McMahon were taken out of their company to be the first people transformed into Super Soldiers, a new type of alien-human hybrid intended by the alien Colonists as replacements for normal humans.

Knowle reached the rank of Master Sergeant and continued on with his military career by joining the Department of Defense. The work he did there is unknown, but it is safe to assume that he was involved in classified operations. When Doggett became assigned to the X-Files, he re-established contact with Rohrer. Doggett became suspicious of Rohrer when information was given to him from Rohrer that got a man killed, but it was not until Doggett saw Rohrer meet with Alex Krycek that he realized Rohrer was a member of the conspiracy.

In "Nothing Important Happened Today II", he is decapitated by fellow Super Soldier, Shannon McMahon, but owing to his hybrid abilities, manages to then impale her with his arm, and they both fall into a water reservoir, presumably both now dead.

However, in the series finale, "The Truth", it is revealed that he survived, when Mulder breaks into Mount Weather. Rohrer chases down Mulder and in the ensuing scuffle Rohrer is electrocuted. Mulder is then taken into military custody and put on trial for Rohrer's supposed death. Eventually, Mulder breaks out with the help of Alvin Kersh, and with Dana Scully, headed to New Mexico for a final confrontation with the Cigarette Smoking Man, whom he discovered was still alive. Doggett and Monica Reyes went after Mulder and Scully to warn them that the conspirators knew where they were. Rohrer, alive and well, followed, intending to kill them all (including the Cigarette Smoking Man, who had long since outlived his usefulness to the conspiracy). However, as he approached Doggett and Reyes in the New Mexican desert, Rohrer died from exposure to magnetite. It turned out that the Cigarette Smoking Man figured out that magnetite killed the Super Soldiers, and consequently chose to hide in a pueblo saturated with it.

=== Cigarette Smoking Man ===
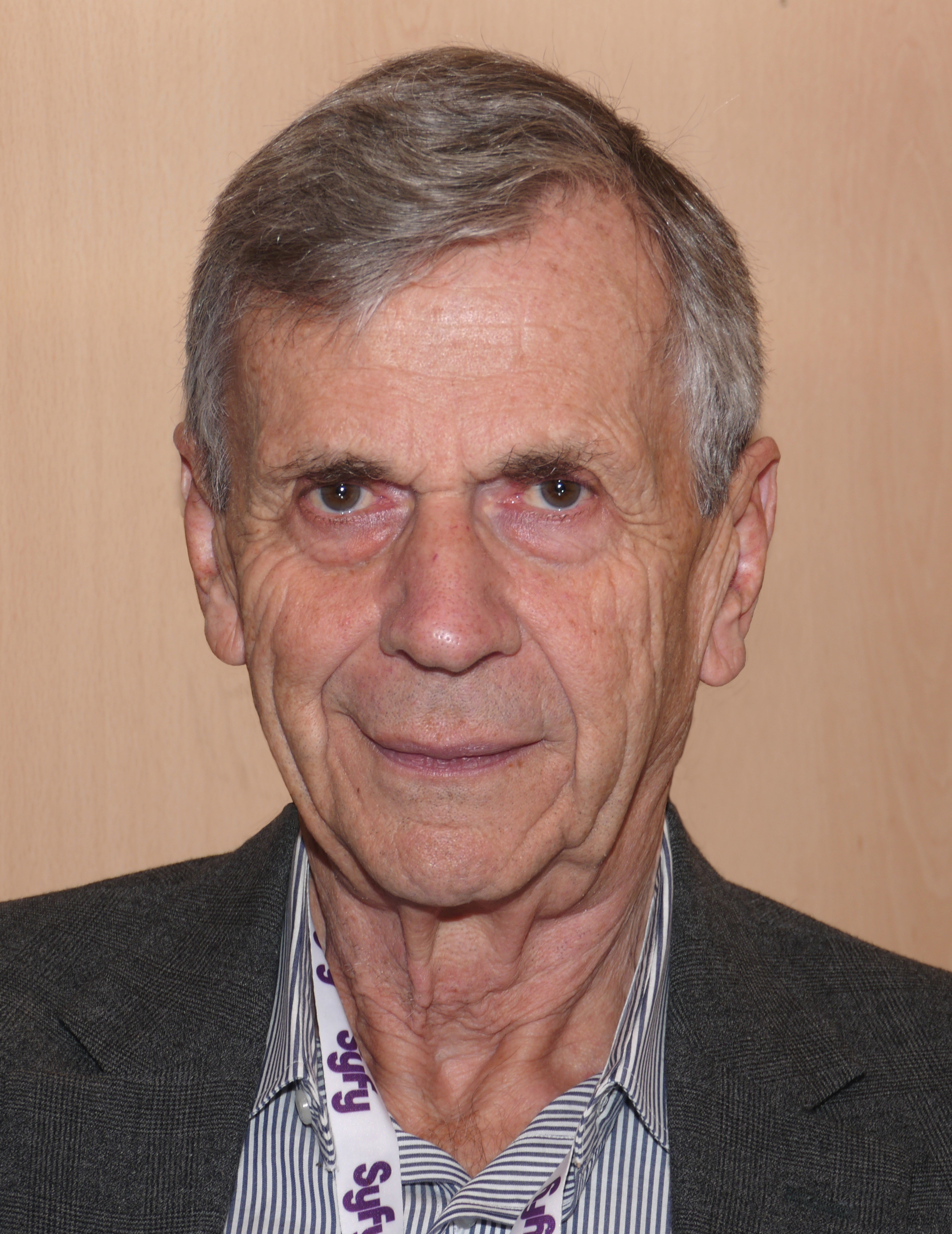
William B. Davis portrayed the Cigarette Smoking Man.

C.G.B. Spender, best known as the Cigarette Smoking Man, is portrayed by William B. Davis, and serves as the main antagonist of the series. In Spender's first appearance, he oversaw Dana Scully's debriefing and disposed of her evidence in the show's pilot episode, and eventually developed into the series' primary antagonist. The character is known initially only by this nickname because he is almost always seen chain-smoking Morley Cigarettes, and is usually surrounded by clouds of smoke. In the first seasons of the show, he was usually present in Walter Skinner's office, which was often a sign to discredit Fox Mulder's work on the X-Files.

He is involved in the Syndicate, a shadow organization within the United States government that exists to hide the fact that aliens are visiting Earth from the public. Spender is the leader of the Men in Black (MIB) in the series. In the season 6 two-part episodes "Two Fathers" and "One Son" it is learned that his birthname or alias is C.G.B. Spender and was formerly married to Cassandra Spender, with whom he had a son, Jeffrey Frank Spender. Diana Fowley is revealed to be a subordinate of his; together, they escape the annihilation of the Syndicate. His confidence in Jeffrey falters after a failed assassination attempt and later on Jeffrey's betrayal, he confronts his son and apparently kills him. The episodes also presented further evidence suggesting that he is Mulder's father. Eventually, Fowley also splits from him, which leads to her death. After the fall of the Syndicate, Smoking Man has no more fellow conspirators who can match his power, so he begins to operate as he wishes. However, his cancer resurfaces and he requires the use of a wheelchair. At the end of the seventh season, Alex Krycek and Marita Covarrubias betray him and throw him down a flight of stairs, where they presumed him dead.

Through the eighth and ninth seasons, he was presumed dead until Jeffrey Spender appeared in "William". It is learned that his attempted murder on his son failed which led him to subject his son to terrible experiments. In this very same episode it is revealed that he's supposedly Mulder's biological father. In the series finale, Mulder and Scully travel through remote New Mexico, and reach a pueblo where a "wise man" reputedly lives. It is in fact the Smoking Man. He is shown to be in the same condition as when he disappeared, but has degenerated further and is now quite unkempt. He has a shock of long white hair, and is living a primitive life in hiding from the New Syndicate. He reveals to Mulder and Scully all he has left to tell, including the fact that the aliens are scheduled to invade in 2012. Shortly after he is supposedly killed by a missile shot from a helicopter ordered by Knowle Rohrer, but is shown alive in the 2016 episode "My Struggle".

=== Well-Manicured Man ===
The Well-Manicured Man is a British member of the Syndicate. An Englishman, he is an important member, along with The Smoking Man and The Elder, and was a friend of Bill Mulder earlier in his life. The Well-Manicured Man is instrumental in the Syndicate's secondary agenda, to develop a vaccination against the black oil used by the aliens as a means of mind control. To this end, he works with Alex Krycek to develop a vaccine, eventually testing it—successfully—on Marita Covarrubias.

In the 1998 feature film The X-Files, when Scully is infected with the black oil and taken to Antarctica, it is the Well-Manicured Man who, having grown disillusioned with the Syndicate, gives Mulder the coordinates needed to find her and a sample of the vaccine needed to cure Scully. The colonists had kept secret a secondary characteristic of the black oil—that those infected with it for prolonged periods would gestate a new colonist lifeform, killing the host. Upon discovering this, the Syndicate vowed to work more closely with the colonists in the hope of being spared this fate, while only the Well-Manicured Man wished to continue working on a vaccination for resistance. This rejection led to his betrayal of the Syndicate, and to him committing suicide by car bomb before his duplicity was discovered.

The Well-Manicured Man was portrayed by John Neville in all his appearances. Conceived as the "voice of reason" within the Syndicate, the character has been seen as representing an opposing viewpoint to that of The Smoking Man. The character has been positively received by critics. MTV's Tami Katzoff has called him a "legendary TV character", noting his "moral ambivalence about the work of his shadow organization" and his ability to show "empathy for Mulder and Scully". The San Francisco Chronicle's Bob Graham has praised Neville's portrayal of the character in the feature film, calling his expository monologue "a Wagnerian demonstration of the art of declamation".

=== X ===
X, sometimes referred to as Mr. X, serves as an informant to Mulder, replacing Deep Throat in this capacity. While X's loyalties and his own agenda were often unclear, he has more than once proven that he at least does not want Mulder dead. In the episode "End Game", he is approached by Scully, who pleads that she needs to know where Mulder is, believing his life to be in danger. X reluctantly gives her the information after a fight with Skinner. In "731", X's loyalty to Mulder is further confirmed. Trapped on a train car equipped with a time bomb, Mulder is attacked by an assassin. X fatally shoots the assassin as he is about to step off the car, and boards with only enough time left to save either Mulder or the alien-human hybrid the car was transporting, opting to save Mulder. In the season 4 opener "Herrenvolk", X's position as an informant is discovered by the Syndicate, and he is assassinated, but not before leading Mulder to his successor, Marita Covarrubias. After his death, X appears two more times—in The Lone Gunmen origin story "Unusual Suspects," set before his death, and as a ghost in the series finale, "The Truth".

X is portrayed in the series by Steven Williams, and made his début in the second season episode "The Host", although the character would not appear on-screen until "Sleepless", two episodes later. The role had originally been conceived as a female, with Natalija Nogulich cast in the role, however her initial scenes were deemed unsatisfactory by the producers, leading to her replacement. Williams' portrayal of X was intended to introduce a personality completely different from the character's predecessor, Deep Throat, and has been positively received by critics and fans.

=== Conrad Strughold ===
Conrad Strughold is a fictional character played by Armin Mueller-Stahl in the 1998 motion picture The X-Files: Fight the Future.

Strughold, a German scientist and entrepreneur, is the leader of the Syndicate. The Strughold mine in remote West Virginia, where the Syndicate secretly kept files on and tissue samples of abductees, is named after him. In the film, he authorizes Dana Scully's abduction, seeing it as a way to effectively break Fox Mulder's spirit, and as a more profitable alternative to outright killing Mulder. He lives in Tunisia. It is believed that he has Nazi ties and is unable to enter the United States because it would draw too much attention to the Syndicate. Strughold survived the demise of the Syndicate in season 6, though as of the end of the series, he is probably either dead, in hiding, or working with the New Syndicate (though the last option is unlikely).

He is possibly the only member of the Syndicate to like or trust the Cigarette Smoking Man, as they are shown as having a slightly more cordial and far less adversarial relationship than with the other members.

The season 6 episode "One Son" features a scene where Scully recounts the activities of Diana Fowley in the early 1990s, in which she monitored MUFON groups in Europe and took weekly trips to Tunisia, the implication being that she was reporting to Strughold during her time on this assignment.

He is almost certainly named after Hubertus Strughold, a Nazi scientist who came to the US during Operation Paperclip after the end of World War II. (The original episode to show the mine in West Virginia was season 3's "Paper Clip", although Strughold himself did not appear in this episode, or in any television episodes of the show).

== Minor characters ==
=== Scott Blevins ===
Section Chief Scott Blevins is portrayed by Charles Cioffi. Blevins was a top official in the Federal Bureau of Investigation who was bankrolled by Roush Pharmaceuticals, the same group that bankrolled Michael Kritschgau. In 1992, then Division Chief Blevins assigned Dana Scully to work with Fox Mulder on the X-files, cases that involved paranormal or unexplained phenomena. Blevins believed that Scully would help provide a more scientific analysis of the X-files cases.

The following year, Blevins recommended that Mulder be removed from the X-files due to Mulder's personal agenda regarding the cases. Later that year, Section Chief Joseph McGrath went over Blevins's head in an attempt to order a shut down of the X-files. Mulder and Scully would be later placed under the supervision of Assistant Director Walter Skinner, and Blevins would be placed in the position of Section Chief.

In 1997, Blevins led a joint FBI committee that was investigating the legitimacy of Mulder's work on the X-files and his apparent suicide. After Mulder was discovered alive, he testified before the committee naming Blevins as the FBI mole responsible for giving Special Agent Scully cancer and working with the government conspiracy. Blevins was subsequently killed by another member of the committee who made his death appear to be a suicide.

=== Dr. Charles (Chuck) Burks ===
Dr. Charles Burks is portrayed by Bill Dow, and appeared in a total of six episodes between 1995 and 2001. First appearing in "The Calusari" as a digital photo expert and using the nickname Chuck, Dr. Burks was occasionally returned to as an open-minded expert more in line with Mulder's belief in the paranormal than Scully's skepticism. His contributions to X-Files investigations include aura photography and sonic analysis, however he also delved into languages and mysticism (in the episode "Badlaa", in which he is introduced to John Doggett as an old friend of Fox Mulder's).

=== Luis Cardinal ===
Luis Cardinal is portrayed by Lenno Britos who appeared in a total of four episodes. Cardinal was a Nicaraguan mercenary working for the Cigarette Smoking Man, briefly partnered with Alex Krycek, at which time he killed Dana Scully's sister, Melissa Scully, in a case of mistaken identity. He also shot Assistant Director Walter Skinner, who had survived. He was later taken into custody by the Washington, D.C. Police Department, and was then eliminated in prison to be silenced.

=== Arthur Dales ===
Arthur Dales, portrayed by Darren McGavin in present-day scenes and Fredric Lehne in flashbacks, is a retired FBI agent. In 1952, while Dales investigated suspected communist spies for the House Un-American Activities Committee, he dealt with Edward Skur, a suspected Communist who had an alien spider living symbiotically inside him. He later discovered two more people with the same affliction, and the case became the first X-File. Dales spent the rest of his career investigating X-Files before an early retirement. He lived in Washington, D.C. before moving in 1999 to Florida, where he recruited Mulder and Scully to investigate disappearances caused by a tentacled creature in the midst of a hurricane. His brother, also called Arthur Dales (M. Emmet Walsh, and also played by Lehne in flashbacks), was a police officer in Roswell, New Mexico, where he met in 1947 Josh Exley, a baseball player who was actually a disguised alien.

=== Max Fenig ===
Max Fenig, portrayed by Scott Bellis, was a member of NICAP who met Fox Mulder in a military detention, after being captured while investigating a possible UFO crash site. Mulder eventually discovered that Fenig was more than a UFO fanatic, despite Dana Scully's suspicion that his abduction experiences were the result of hallucinations or epilepsy – an illness that was revealed after Fenig suffered a seizure during the episode. Max Fenig lived in a trailer, which was parked at Townsend, Wisconsin, full of UFO material. Besides being an epileptic, he was constantly in fear of being abducted again and had a red scar in the shape of a triangle behind his ear. Fenig had already heard about Mulder and the X-Files. After being captured in his trailer, Fenig was seen for the last time by Mulder in a waterfront dock floating in the air encased in blue light – he vanished seconds later. He reappeared much later, in a two-part episode during the fourth season, where he died in a plane crash.

=== Theresa Hoese ===
Theresa Hoese (née Nemman) is portrayed by Sarah Koskoff. Hoese was the daughter of Jay Nemman. Her first appearance was when she travelled to a cemetery with her father in her hometown of Bellefleur, Oregon. Her father was infuriated with Fox Mulder and Dana Scully, who were preparing to exhume the body of Ray Soames, which he had autopsied earlier. Hoese tried to speak to the FBI agents at the cemetery, but her father forced her to stay in the car in which they had arrived. Eventually, she persuaded her father to leave with her in the car and accompany her home. Later in the same month, Teresa Nemman made an anonymous phone call to Mulder's motel room and informed him that Peggy O'Dell was dead. While Mulder and Scully stood outside one night, Teresa Nemman came to the agents and pleaded for their help. She was later kidnapped by Billy Miles and nearly abducted by aliens, but was saved by Mulder and Scully.

Seven years later she met Mulder and Scully again, married at the time to Ray Hoese, and living with her husband and baby. By this time she had changed her name from Nemman to Hoese. She was later kidnapped by an Alien Bounty Hunter She was returned to Earth in "This Is Not Happening", which led to an investigation by John Doggett and Scully. Theresa nearly died but was saved by Jeremiah Smith. She later appeared in a slide show in "Three Words".

=== Albert Hosteen ===
Albert Hosteen is portrayed by Floyd Red Crow Westerman. Hosteen was a Navajo code talker whom Dana Scully sought out for help to translate the encrypted files on a digital disc obtained by Fox Mulder. The word "Hosteen" means "old man" in the Navajo language. He led Mulder to a buried boxcar filled with the corpses of human-alien hybrids. Hosteen saved Mulder's life after he nearly died in the boxcar after an attack by the Men in Black. Soon after, he traveled to Washington, D.C. where he prayed over Melissa Scully in the hospital.

Years later, Hosteen returned when he once again was called to translate alien writing from an artifact found in Côte d'Ivoire. Hosteen was later taken to a New Mexico hospital due to an unexplained illness, with his doctors fearing the worst. Hosteen died after spending two weeks in a coma. Before dying, Hosteen's spirit appeared to Scully several times in her apartment, imploring her to find and save her missing partner before Syndicate scientists could remove and study the immunity he had to the alien virus inside him and use it in their plans for surviving Colonization. Hosteen subtly guided her to Mulder's location encouraging a more spiritual route; Hosteen and Scully prayed for Mulder. The next morning, he vanished, having died the night before.

=== Michael Kritschgau ===
Michael Kritschgau is portrayed by John Finn. Kritschgau was an employee of the Department of Defense who claimed to know the entire truth behind the insidious government conspiracy. He encountered Scully in a university laboratory, where he pushed her down stairs while attempting to escape. After Scully tracked him down, he met with her and Mulder to tell them the truth as he understood it. He explained that the entire alien and UFO conspiracy was nothing more than an elaborate series of lies to draw attention away from sinister military experiments on an unsuspecting public. So-called "abductions" were actually careful military tests involving chemical and biological warfare, among other things. Kritschgau's son died as a result of Gulf War Syndrome, which he fell party to because of his work at the Defense Advanced Research Projects Agency and connections to a pharmaceutical company called Roush. Following the incidents, Kritschgau was fired.

In 1999, the discovery of an alien spacecraft off the coast of Africa caused Mulder to begin experiencing intense mental trauma. While in the hospital, Mulder requested that Skinner bring in Kritschgau, who would know what to do. Kritschgau recognized Mulder's symptoms from his work in the CIA and was able to identify the correct drug to slow down Mulder's brain activity to a normal level. He then became involved in the investigation of the spacecraft symbols, having hacked into Scully's computer and downloading the images she took. Kritschgau's involvement was soon noticed. Alex Krycek was sent to steal his files and burn his apartment, but only after he shot Kritschgau dead.

The name for this character came from Gillian Anderson's real-life friend from growing up in Grand Rapids, Michigan.

=== Richard Matheson ===
Senator Richard Matheson, portrayed by Raymond J. Barry, was a politician that took a liking to Fox Mulder and was interested in his work at the FBI. After the X-Files were shut down in 1994, Matheson prompted Mulder to visit the Arecibo Observatory in Puerto Rico to continue his search for the truth. Eventually, Matheson distanced himself from Mulder because he felt his political career might be in jeopardy.

Later that year, Mulder went to Matheson's office in an attempt to contact him to gain information about Scully's abduction, but he was intercepted by X, who told him that Matheson could not give him the information he wanted without risking himself. He later gave Mulder a lead that led him to government program to import Japanese scientists to the US after World War II. Mulder ran into Matheson years later while investigating a mysterious illness contracted by Walter Skinner. Matheson was directly involved in an illicit deal concerning nanotechnology. The incident further soured relations between Mulder and Matheson.

=== Billy Miles ===
Billy Miles, portrayed by Zachary Ansley, appeared in five episodes of the series. First seen as the apparently comatose son of a detective from the town Bellefleur, Oregon, Billy was later revealed to be unwittingly assisting in the abductions and deaths of several of his former high school classmates whilst controlled by another presence. Eight years later, having recovered from these events, and now a sheriff's deputy, Miles contacted Mulder and Scully to seek their aid investigating a possible UFO crash. During the course of this investigation, Miles, and Mulder, were abducted. Miles' body was later recovered, in an advanced state of decay, from which was he not only revived, but recreated as a "super soldier", an advanced form of alien-human hybrid. In this new form, Miles set his sights on killing all of those involved in monitoring Scully's abnormal pregnancy, eventually targeting Scully herself.

=== Bill Mulder ===
William "Bill" Mulder is portrayed by Peter Donat. William was the father of Fox and Samantha Mulder and husband of Teena Mulder. He was born in California in 1936. As a young man, he began working for the government and eventually the State Department. Among his colleagues were Deep Throat, Alvin Kurtzweil, and the Cigarette Smoking Man. In 1973, the group of men became organized as the Syndicate. As part of the colonization plot, the members of the Syndicate were to exchange a loved one each for an alien fetus. Possession of the fetus would allow the Syndicate to begin development of an alien-human hybrid. Mulder was against this exchange and did not appear at El Rico Air Force Base with a loved one as planned. In order to secure the exchange, an alien spacecraft was sent to retrieve his daughter, Samantha, who had been selected by Mulder instead of his son, Fox. Horrified at his own involvement, Mulder came up with the plan to create a vaccine against the alien virus that would be used during colonization. Even though he got his way and development of the vaccine began, Mulder suffered further personal trauma when he and his wife divorced. He moved from their home in Chilmark to another in West Tisbury, Massachusetts.

In 1995, William planned to divulge all his secrets to his son after encountering a clone of Samantha fleeing an alien bounty hunter. However, the Syndicate learned of his intention to reveal the truth to Mulder, and Alex Krycek was sent to prevent it. Krycek murdered William in his vacation home on Martha's Vineyard.

=== Teena Mulder ===
Elizabeth "Teena" Mulder (née Kuipers) was portrayed by Rebecca Toolan. She was the wife of State Department official Bill Mulder and mother to Fox and Samantha Mulder. Teena was born in Ohio in 1941. Around 1961, Teena had a brief extramarital affair with the Cigarette Smoking Man, a friend of Bill's. Fox Mulder was born later that year. In 1965, she gave birth to Samantha Mulder. In November 1973, Samantha was abducted from the family home in Chilmark, Massachusetts, ultimately leading to Teena and Bill's divorce. Teena likely knew more about Samantha's abduction and the Syndicate than she ever let on, but kept this information to herself, either to protect her son, or because it was too painful for her to bring up.

In 1996, she suffered a stroke at the Mulder family's former summerhouse in Quonochontaug, Rhode Island. She survived thanks to a quick emergency call from X, paramedics were able to save her life, but she remained in a coma. The Cigarette Smoking Man later convinced a bounty hunter to heal her. Years later in 2000, Teena committed suicide after learning that she was terminally ill with a disfiguring disease called Paget's Carcinoma. Before her death, she subtly requested that Fox accept that Samantha was gone and move on with his life.

=== Agent Pendrell ===
Special Agent Pendrell is portrayed by actor Brendan Beiser. Agent Pendrell first appeared as an employee of the FBI's Sci-Crime Lab who assisted Agent Scully in her investigations in the third season.

Pendrell shows a helpful demeanor, a self-deprecating nature and nurses an obvious crush on Agent Dana Scully. He provides analytical assistance to Mulder and Scully over the course of several episodes, showing a particular aptitude for working with computers and biological materials. His feelings for Scully, however, remain unrequited; in the fourth-season episode "Tempus Fugit", Pendrell runs into Scully in a bar. He seizes the opportunity to buy her a birthday drink. On his way back to Scully's table, Pendrell is caught in the crossfire of a shootout with a Syndicate assassin, taking a bullet. He subsequently dies of his wound, leaving Scully to mourn that she had never even learned his first name.

=== Gibson Praise ===
Gibson Andrew Praise is a character portrayed by Jeff Gulka. Gibson is introduced as a young chess prodigy who thwarted the assassination attempt on his life by stepping back out of the path of a sniper bullet. Jeffrey Spender was assigned to investigate the case, but Fox Mulder intruded on the briefing and immediately came to the conclusion that Gibson sensed the shot pre-cognitively. The investigation led Dana Scully to find that Gibson had an unusual level of development in one brain lobe not yet fully understood by neuroscience. Mulder thought Gibson might be the key to understanding human potential and to everything in the X-Files. He interrogated the would-be assassin in prison, who said the boy was a "missing link", and Mulder jumped to the conclusion that Gibson had alien genetic structure and was proof of ancient astronauts.

Mulder, Scully, and Diana Fowley attempted to keep Gibson safe and under guard, suspecting that the alien conspirators were the ones behind the attempted assassination, but Fowley was shot while at her post, and Gibson was subsequently kidnapped by the Syndicate. Months later, after the events of the movie, Mulder and Scully found Gibson hiding in their car. Gibson's skull had been cut open and stitched back shut, signs that the Syndicate scientists had conducted experiments or investigations on his brain. They took him to the hospital, where he was soon kidnapped again by an operative of the Cigarette Smoking Man.

In 2000, Scully found Gibson living in Arizona in a school for the deaf, where he was apparently in hiding from alien bounty hunters or a New Syndicate like organization, who wanted him because he was "part alien". At the end of the episode, John Doggett said Gibson had become a ward of the state, and had been put under special protection.

His final appearance was in the series finale, where it was revealed that Mulder had been hiding with Gibson in New Mexico for the duration of his ninth season absence. Gibson volunteered to be a witness at Mulder's trial, despite Mulder's objection that he should stay hidden. After Mulder and Scully left to make their final escape, Agents Doggett and Monica Reyes vowed that they would try to keep him safe – a promise that Gibson took with a grain of salt, knowing the capabilities of his past captors.

=== William Scully Jr. ===
William "Bill" Scully, Jr. was portrayed by Pat Skipper and Ryan DeBoer, and Joshua Murray during childhood flashbacks. He was the eldest son of Bill and Margaret Scully and brother to Dana, Melissa, and Charles Scully. Bill, Jr. had followed in his father's footsteps and joined the U.S. Navy. Bill, Jr. was never impressed with Fox Mulder and got angry with Dana when she did not tell him about her cancer. He did not understand why she had not told anyone or why she was still at work. Dana told him she still had responsibility to the people in her life, even though she had not told them about it. Bill angrily asked Dana if her responsibility was to Mulder, and if so, why was he not with her after she was pushed down the stairs by Michael Kritschgau. She ignored his question.

Dana Scully ended up in the hospital after she collapsed at the hearing into Mulder's death. Mulder first met Bill Jr. when he and his mother came to visit Scully. Bill asked Mulder to leave the work out of Scully's illness, to "let her die with dignity". Later, when Mulder brought the chip to Scully as a possible cure, Bill again attacked him. He accused Mulder of being the reason why he lost one sister and now it seemed like he was losing Dana too.

Bill became increasingly worried about his sister when she stayed with him and his wife Tara one Christmas. Dana received a strange phone call that lead to the house of a woman who had apparently committed suicide. Scully believed that the voice on the phone was Melissa's. She disappeared from the house, physically and emotionally, quite a bit over the Christmas holidays, and Bill became worried when she told him she believed Melissa rang from beyond the grave to get her to help Emily Sim, and that she believed Emily was Melissa's daughter. He sympathized with Scully's desire to have a child, because he and Tara had not been able to become parents for years until the time of the episode. He tried to convince her Melissa was not Emily's mother and showed her a photograph of Melissa obviously not pregnant about four weeks before Emily was born, to which Dana replied that there may have been surrogate motherhood and that the family did not know much about Melissa's whereabouts at that time. Bill and Mrs. Scully are shocked to learn that Dana Scully is in fact Emily's mother. They all attended Emily's funeral and were distraught for Scully.

=== Margaret Scully ===
Margaret "Maggie" Scully was portrayed by actor Sheila Larken. Margaret, or "Maggie" as she was called by her husband, Bill Scully, is the mother of Dana Scully and her three siblings: William "Bill" Scully, Jr., Melissa Scully and Charles Scully. Margaret was widowed early in the series, since her husband died of a massive heart attack. She may have a bit of psychic intuition – when Dana is kidnapped, Margaret confessed to Mulder that she had had a premonition about Dana, but was afraid to tell her skeptical daughter. In 2016, Margaret suffered a heart attack and went into a coma. Dana revealed that Margaret's advance healthcare directive allowed life support to be applied, however she was unaware that Margaret had revoked it and replaced it with a DNR a year earlier. After hearing Charles Scully's voice on the phone, Margaret briefly awoke from her coma before dying, with Mulder and Dana by her side. Her last words to Mulder were "My son is named William, too".

=== Melissa Scully ===
Melissa "Missy" Scully was portrayed by Melinda McGraw as an adult and Rebecca Codling and Lauren Diewold during childhood flashbacks. Melissa was the sister of Dana, Bill and Charles, and the daughter of William and Margaret. Melissa believed in new age mysticism, whereas Dana was a firm believer in hard science. Melissa came to see Dana when she had returned to the hospital after her abduction and claimed she could feel Dana's spirit was still inside her body.

After Scully discovered the implant placed in her neck, Melissa suggested her to undertake regression therapy in an attempt to uncover the truth about her abduction. Melissa was shot in the head by mistake by Luis Cardinal and Alex Krycek, who were trying to kill her sister Dana, as she entered Scully's apartment ("The Blessing Way"). As Melissa lay dying in hospital, Dana asked for Albert Hosteen to go and pray for her ailing sister, as he had done for Fox Mulder shortly before. However, Hosteen was not confident of the outcome and Melissa soon died.

Dana eventually detained and arrested Cardinal during his assassination attempt on Walter Skinner while Skinner was being transported in an ambulance. Upon being questioned by Dana, Cardinal denied involvement in Melissa's death, implicating Krycek as her killer. However, Cardinal was in fact the trigger man. Cardinal later died in his cell, his death made to look like a suicide. Some time after her death, Scully began to receive mysterious phone calls from someone sounding mysteriously like Melissa. After discovering Emily Sim, Scully is at first under the impression that the young girl is in fact Melissa's daughter, before discovering that she is in fact the child's mother.

=== Second Elder ===
The Second Elder is portrayed by George Murdock. He is a member of the Syndicate. While it was never made clear what power the Second Elder held in the Syndicate, it is clear that he did not have the same power as the First Elder or Conrad Strughold. He seemed to be a skeptic and wanted to collaborate with the Colonists since he did not believe in the Alien rebels. The Second Elder made his first appearance in "The Red and the Black" in season 5. The Well-Manicured Man showed photos of the Faceless Rebel to the Syndicate Elders at the hospital. The First Elder and Second Elder discussed what appeared to be self-mutilation, but deduced it was some sort of protection against the black oil. The rebel was the lone survivor of a crashed spacecraft at a military base in West Virginia. Already possessing the Russian vaccine obtained by Alex Krycek, the Well-Manicured Man and the Elders realize that their ultimate goal of stopping the alien invasion (whilst maintaining the facade of assisting it), may be achieved by creating an alliance with the alien resistance. To test the effectiveness of the vaccine, Marita Covarrubias was injected with it.

The Second Elder's final appearance was in "Two Fathers". The Cigarette Smoking Man called the Second Elder at his home to inform of the Rebel attack. He had called an emergency meeting of the Syndicate and encouraged the Second Elder to attend. The Second Elder indicated that he would catch the next plane, then hung up the phone. Shortly afterward, he was killed by a Rebel, which then infiltrates the Syndicate's meeting disguised as the Second Elder. The rebel in disguise is later killed by Alex Krycek after a failed attempt by Jeffrey Spender.

=== Jeremiah Smith ===
Jeremiah Smith is portrayed by Roy Thinnes. Smith was an alien member of the resistance against the Syndicate who exhibited healing and shape shifting abilities. He gained public attention after saving the lives of several people following a shooting in a fast food restaurant. It is likely that Smith was an alias, because at least five employees around the country used the name while working at the Social Security Administration. One Smith was captured by the Syndicate and held for execution by the Alien Bounty Hunter but was able to escape and contact Fox Mulder. Mulder and Dana Scully saved Smith from the bounty hunter in hope that he would save the life of Mulder's mother, who had just suffered a stroke. However, Smith brought Mulder to Canada and revealed a Syndicate-run program involving bees. Confronted with the bounty hunter yet again, Smith fled, leaving Mulder on his own.

Smith resurfaced in 2001 after being discovered by Monica Reyes. In Montana, he was found amongst a cult based on the belief that the apocalypse was near and would be brought about by aliens. He helped the cult's leader, Absalom, heal returned abductees. Scully realized he was involved after observing the remarkable healing of the abductees and the fact that someone appeared to change their appearance on a security video. Upon the mysterious return of Mulder, Scully sought out Smith to heal him, but Smith was abducted by the UFO that appeared over the camp.

=== Cassandra Spender ===
Cassandra Anne Spender is portrayed by Veronica Cartwright. Cassandra was a multiple abductee, critical to the plans of the Syndicate. She was the ex-wife of The Smoking Man and mother of Special Agent Jeffrey Spender, as well as "Patient X", the primary test subject in the project to develop an alien-human hybrid.

Cassandra first came to the attention of Special Agent Fox Mulder while proclaiming her belief that the aliens were coming to promote peace. At the time, Mulder was disillusioned by the revelations of Michael Kritschgau. He did not believe Cassandra's insisting that the aliens were calling her and other abductees to "lighthouses", where colonization would begin, despite a mass incineration of abductees at Skyland Mountain, where Dana Scully had been abducted three years earlier. A rebel group of aliens who mutilated themselves to avoid infection by the black oil were attempting to destroy the work the Syndicate had done, finally summoning both Scully and Cassandra to the same site in Pennsylvania. Before the rebels could manage to destroy the group, however, an alien craft appeared overhead and abducted Cassandra.

Cassandra later reappeared in a train car in Virginia, where doctors who had been operating on her were burned alive by the same faceless rebel aliens. She had been cured of her former disabilities, but now believed the aliens had far more sinister motives than she had originally thought, having learned of their plans for colonization. Demanding to see Agent Mulder, she explained her newfound concerns, then insisted that she be killed before everyone else died. She was then taken by a decontamination team led by Diana Fowley for her presentation to the alien colonists. Before she could be presented, however, the site was overrun by alien rebels, who killed many of the key players of the syndicate, as well as Cassandra herself. Cassandra appeared in a flashback in the eleventh season premiere "My Struggle III", portrayed by actress Fiona Vroom.

=== Toothpick Man ===
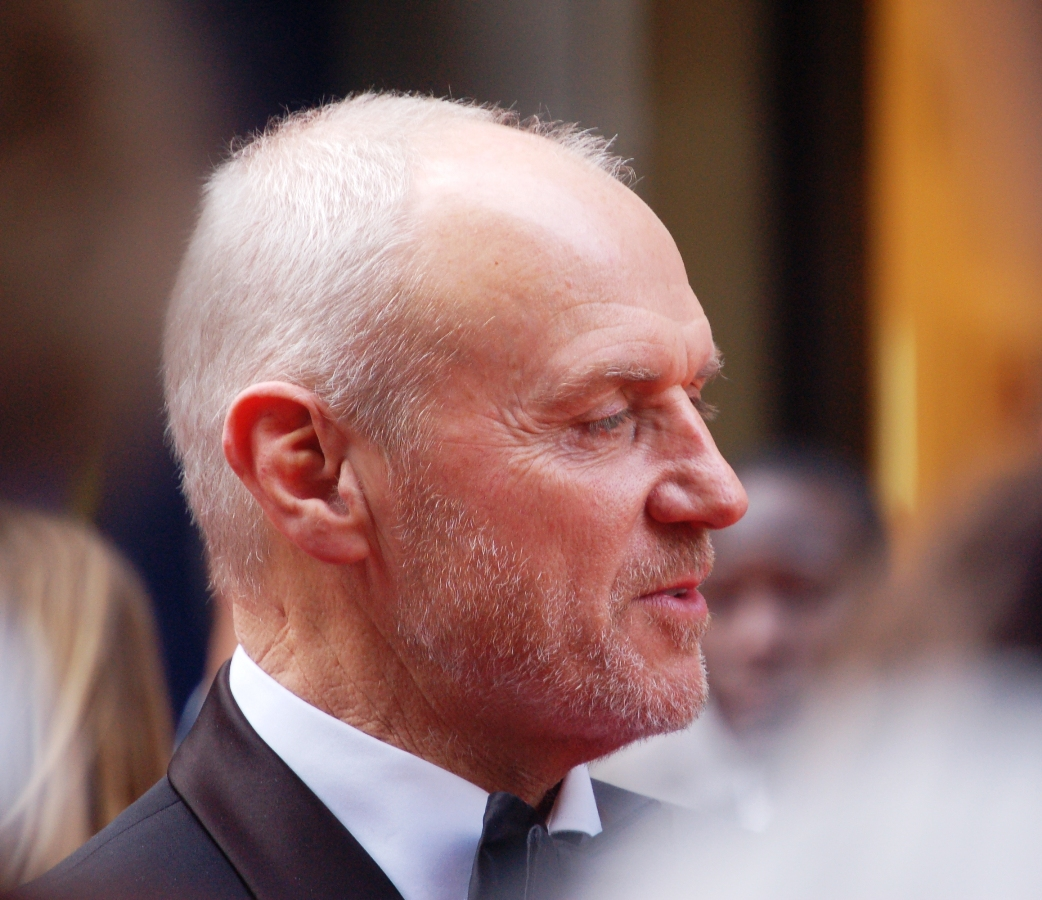
Dale at the 2008 BAFTA Television Awards

Toothpick Man is portrayed by New Zealand actor Alan Dale. His role in the series was the leader of the New Syndicate. During the ninth season he worked within the FBI. He is noted for consistently fiddling a toothpick. Although he appeared human, he was exposed to be an alien by Gibson Praise in the final episode (albeit the viewing audience was earlier shown the characteristic alien 'super-soldier' bumps on the back of his neck at the end of the season nine episode "Providence").

Toothpick Man was created to replace The Smoking Man (portrayed by William B. Davis), who had been written out at the end of season 7. He had access to the President of the United States, as can be seen in a deleted scene of the final episode.

=== Jackson Van De Kamp ===
Jackson Van De Kamp (born William Scully III) is the son of FBI Special Agent Dana Scully and Fox Mulder as well the adopted son of Mr. and Mrs. Van De Kamp. He was born in the eighth-season finale, "Existence". Throughout the last two seasons of the series, William was encompassed by an aura of mystique, ranging from his origin to the apparent supernatural abilities he possessed.

At some point, Scully made the decision to have a child through in vitro fertilization, and asked Mulder to be the sperm donor, to which he agreed, as revealed via flashback. It was said in this same episode that the in vitro attempt failed. There were apparently no repeat attempts, and it is unclear exactly when in the series timeline this took place. It is heavily implied throughout the seventh season that Scully and Mulder's relationship was developing into the romantic sphere. In season nine, it was confirmed that sexual encounters had occurred between the agents prior to Mulder's abduction. In "Essence", Mulder's inner monologue reflects: "How did this child come to be? What set its heart beating? Is it the product of a union or the work of a divine hand?" suggesting William may have been conceived naturally through intercourse, by some paranormal intervention, or perhaps some measure of both. In The X-Files: I Want to Believe, and the tenth season, both Mulder and Scully referred to William as their son. However, in season 11, it is revealed that William is in fact the son of C.G.B Spender, The Smoking Man. He was medically conceived in season 7 while Scully was unconscious. He is played by Miles Robbins while Jerry Shiban (the son of John Shiban) and several other children play him as an infant, Bentley Hixsons plays him as a young child, Chase Nicholson plays him as a preteen, Austin Dunn plays him as a young teen, Keith Arbuthnot plays him as Ghouli, François Chau plays him as Peter Wong and David Duchovny plays him as Mulder. The version seen in Scully's dream is played by siblings Hannah Longworth, Aiden Longworth and Rowan Longworth as a child, preteen and teen respectively.

=== Eugene Victor Tooms ===
Eugene Victor Tooms is portrayed by Doug Hutchison. Tooms is an immortal genetic mutant who subsists entirely off of human livers and able to elongate and contort his body to inhuman degrees, hibernating for 30 years between his feeding periods. Tooms frequently steals personal items from his victims, keeping them as trophies.

During his latest feeding period in 1993, Tooms is pursued by Mulder and Scully. Tooms decides on Scully as his final victim and breaks into her home in an attempt to murder her, only for Mulder to arrive. The two are able to incapacitate Tooms and he is subsequently incarcerated in a sanitarium. Tooms is later released and resumes his job as a dog catcher while staying at a halfway house. Tooms's efforts to feed on another victim are hampered by Mulder's vigilance. After framing Mulder for assaulting him and filing a restraining order against him, Tooms murders and feeds on his psychologist. Mulder and Scully track Tooms down to beneath a mall built over his apartment complex and previous lair. After a confrontation with Mulder in his newfound home, Tooms is trapped beneath an escalator and crushed to death when it is activated.

== Footnotes ==
=== References ===
- Edwards, Ted (1996). X-Files Confidential. Little, Brown and Company. ISBN 0-316-21808-1.
- Lovece, Frank (1996). The X-Files Declassified. Citadel Press. ISBN 0-8065-1745-X.
- Lowry, Brian (1995). The Truth is Out There: The Official Guide to the X-Files. Harper Prism. ISBN 0-06-105330-9.
- Meisler, Andy (1998). I Want to Believe: The Official Guide to the X-Files Volume 3. Harper Prism. ISBN 0-06-105386-4.
- Meisler, Andy (1999). Resist or Serve: The Official Guide to the X-Files Volume 4. Harper Prism. ISBN 0-06-107309-1.
- Shearman, Robert; Pearson, Lars (2009). Wanting to Believe: A Critical Guide to The X-Files, Millennium & The Lone Gunmen. Mad Norwegian Press. ISBN 978-0-9759446-9-1.
