= Game On (Catatonia song) =

1998 single by Catatonia

- UK single release

Single by Catatonia

from the album International Velvet
- B-side: "Mulder and Scully" (live); 1. "Strange Glue" (live acoustic)
- Released: 26 October 1998
- Studio: Rockfield (Rockfield, Wales)
- Length: 2:52 (single edit)
- Label: Blanco y Negro
- Songwriters: Cerys Matthews; Mark Roberts; Catatonia
- Producers: TommyD; Catatonia

Catatonia singles chronology
| "Strange Glue" (1998) | "Game On" (1998) | "Dead from the Waist Down" (1999) |

"Game On" is a song by Welsh alternative rock band Catatonia, released as the fifth and final single from their second studio album, International Velvet (1998), in October 1998. It was written by band members Cerys Matthews and Mark Roberts and produced by TommyD and the band. Commercially, the song charted on the UK Singles Chart, peaking at number 33.

== Recording and release ==
"Game On" was the fifth single release from Catatonia's second studio album, International Velvet. Earlier releases from the album had included "Mulder and Scully", which became the break-out song for the band, and "Road Rage" which was nominated for best song at the Brit Awards, the Ivor Novello Awards, and won at the Q Awards.

"Game On" was released in the UK on 26 October 1998, where it peaked at number 33 on the UK Singles Chart. As with the majority of the songs from International Velvet, it had been produced by TommyD. The record company was unhappy with the performance of the single, but they looked ahead to sales of tickets for several large shows coming up for Catatonia as well as the third studio album.

== Composition ==
The line "I know I could never fall from grace, I'm far too clever" first appeared in the song "Sugar Loaf Mountain", which was written by Cerys Matthews and Mark Roberts, and featured both of them singing. It was recorded on their original demos, alongside "Whale" and "Sweet Catatonia". Matthews and Roberts also wrote "Game On"; at the time the duo were in a relationship at the time which was troubled. Matthews later explained that the entire International Velvet had worked because of the difficulties that she and Roberts were experiencing.

== Critical reception ==
In a roundup of the album releases in 1998 for The People newspaper, "Game On", "Don't Need the Sunshine" and "Strange Glue" were called "fantastic examples of how mainstream music does not have to be about bare chests and short skirts". However, not all reviews were positive. When Catatonia Greatest Hits was released in 2002, "Game On" was described as "filler" in a review on BBC Wales.

== Live performances ==
Catatonia continued to perform "Game On" live following the release of their third album, Equally Cursed and Blessed. The song was introduced in the Welsh language during a small scale concert in Llangollen, North Wales.

== Track listings ==
CD single

1. "Game On" – 2:52
2. "Mulder and Scully" (live in Newport) – 3:34
3. "Strange Glue" (live acoustic version) – 3:20

7-inch and cassette single

1. "Game On" – 2:52
2. "Strange Glue" (live acoustic version) – 3:20

== Credits and personnel ==
Credits are lifted from the UK CD single liner notes.

Studio

- Recorded at Rockfield Studios (Rockfield, Wales)

Personnel

- Catatonia – writing, production
  - Cerys Matthews – writing
  - Mark Roberts – writing
- TommyD – production, mixing
- Roland Herrington – mixing
- Paul Read – engineering
- Joe Gibb – engineering
- FTP – digital imaging
- Steve Gullick – band photography

== Charts ==
| Chart (1998) | Peak position |
|---|---|
| Scottish Singles Sales (Official Charts) | 27 |
| UK Singles (Official Charts) | 33 |
