= Strange Glue =

1998 single by Catatonia

Single by Catatonia

from the album International Velvet
- B-side: "That's All Folks"
- Released: 20 July 1998
- Studio: Monnow Valley (Rockfield, Wales)
- Length: 3:44
- Label: Blanco y Negro
- Songwriter(s): Owen Powell, Catatonia
- Producer(s): Catatonia, TommyD

Catatonia singles chronology
"Road Rage" (1998)	"Strange Glue" (1998)	"Game On" (1998)

"Strange Glue" is a song by Welsh alternative rock band Catatonia. Written by guitarist Owen Powell, it was the band's fourth single to be released from International Velvet and charted at No. 11 on the UK Singles Chart. As a solo artist, lead singer Cerys Matthews later sang "Strange Glue" merged with the song "Galway Shawl" in concert.

== B-side ==
The single's B-side, "That's All Folks", was originally intended for the International Velvet album and had appeared on promo copies around the time of "I Am the Mob", but it was later replaced by "My Selfish Gene" as the album's closer. The song is a scathing attack on Catatonia's American label, Warner, written in 1997 when the band feared that they were to be dropped by the label or were to split up.

== Track listings ==
UK CD single

1. "Strange Glue"
2. "Road Rage" (live from the Shepherd's Bush Empire)
3. "That's All Folks"

UK cassette and limited-edition 7-inch red vinyl single

1. "Strange Glue"
2. "That's All Folks"

== Credits and personnel ==
Credits are lifted from the UK CD single inlay.

Studio

- Recorded at Monnow Valley Studios (Rockfield, Wales)

Personnel

- Owen Powell – writing
- Catatonia – writing, production
- TommyD – production, mixing
- Roland Herrington – mixing
- Joe Gibb – engineering
- Jason Harris – assistant engineering
- Stylorouge – design and art direction
- FTP – digital imaging
- Perou – photography
- Nigel Schermuly – TV photography

== Charts ==
Chart (1998)	Peak position
Europe (Eurochart Hot 100)	57
Scotland (OCC)	9
UK Singles (OCC)	11
