= Sarah Michelle Gellar =

American actress (born 1977)

- Gellar in 2011
- Born: April 14, 1977 (age 49); New York City, U.S.
- Other name: Sarah Michelle Prinze
- Occupation: Actress
- Years active: 1981–present
- Spouse: Freddie Prinze Jr. (m. 2002)
- Children: 2

Sarah Michelle Prinze (née Gellar /ˈɡɛlər/ GHEL-ər; born April 14, 1977) is an American actress. She is known for portraying strong female characters in film and television, and is regarded as a scream queen for her work in the horror genre.

After being spotted by a talent agent as a child, Gellar began her career on television at age five. She obtained her first leading role in the syndicated teen drama series Swans Crossing (1992) and had her breakthrough as Kendall Hart on the ABC soap opera All My Children (1993–1995), for which she won a Daytime Emmy Award. She achieved international recognition for her portrayal of Buffy Summers on the WB/UPN supernatural series Buffy the Vampire Slayer (1997–2003), which earned her a Saturn Award and a nomination for a Golden Globe.

In film, Gellar has played leading and supporting roles in I Know What You Did Last Summer (1997), Scream 2 (1997), Cruel Intentions (1999), Scooby-Doo (2002), Scooby-Doo 2: Monsters Unleashed (2004), The Grudge (2004), Southland Tales (2006), Do Revenge (2022), and Ready or Not 2: Here I Come (2026). Her other television credits include Ringer (2011–2012), The Crazy Ones (2013–2014), Wolf Pack (2023), and Dexter: Original Sin (2024–2025).

As a voice actor, Gellar has appeared in such projects as Small Soldiers (1998), Robot Chicken (2005–2018), Happily N'Ever After (2006), TMNT (2007), Call of Duty: Black Ops (2011), Star Wars Rebels (2015–2016), and Masters of the Universe: Revelation (2021). In addition to acting, she co-founded Foodstirs, an e-commerce baking company that operated from 2015 to 2022, released the cookbook Stirring Up Fun with Food (2017), and served as a judge on Star Search (2026).

== Early life ==
Gellar was born in New York City on April 14, 1977. She is the only child of Rosellen (née Greenfield), a nursery school teacher, and Arthur Gellar, a garment worker. Both of her parents are Jewish. In 1984, when she was only seven, her parents divorced and she was raised by her mother on Manhattan's Upper East Side. While growing up, she lost contact with her father, from whom she remained estranged until he died in 2001 when she was only 24. She once described him as "non-existent", and stated: "My father, you can just say, is not in the picture. I'm not being deliberately evasive about him, it's just that there's so little to say." Gellar was a competitive figure skater, once finishing in third place at a New York State regional competition, and obtained a black belt in taekwondo.

With her single mother working "just above the poverty line", Gellar received a partial scholarship to study at the Columbia Grammar & Preparatory School, where she experienced bullying. She remarked: "I was different and that's the one thing you can't be at school, because you're ostracised. I didn't have the money these kids had". As a working child actress, she was not present in class for a considerable amount of time, and recalled having "more absences in the first month than you're supposed to have for an entire year". She then briefly attended the Fiorello H. LaGuardia High School of Music & Art and Performing Arts, but dropped out due to acting obligations. Gellar graduated from the Professional Children's School in 1994 as a "straight A" student with a 4.0 grade average. As she spent significant time working on All My Children while "trying to graduate", the majority of her senior year was completed through guided study.

== Career ==
=== Beginnings and breakthrough (1981–1996) ===
At the age of four, Gellar was spotted by an agent in a restaurant in Upper Manhattan. Two weeks later, she auditioned for a part in the television film An Invasion of Privacy. At the audition, she read both her own lines and those of Valerie Harper, impressing the directors enough to cast her in the role. The film aired on CBS in January 1983.

While growing up, Gellar appeared in television commercials for a variety of brands, such as Burger King, Shake 'n Bake, Duncan Hines, Milton Bradley, LJN, and Avon. A 1982 advertisement for Burger King, in which she claimed the brand made larger and better tasting burgers than competitor McDonald's, was one of the first attack ads in the fast food industry. Executives at McDonald's parent company were so enraged that they sued all parties involved, naming Gellar and reportedly banning her from eating at the food chain. In a 2004 interview, she recalled: "I wasn't allowed to eat there. It was tough because, when you're a little kid, McDonald's is where all your friends have their birthday parties, so I missed out on a lot of apple pies." She was signed as a model for Wilhelmina.

Gellar appeared in a safety skit during the September 28, 1982 episode of Late Night with David Letterman, and returned for the December 11, 1985 episode, during "The Guy Under the Stairs" segment, playing Suzy Walker. Throughout the 1980s, she was a guest performer in the television series Love, Sidney, Guiding Light, Spenser: For Hire, and Crossbow, and played uncredited roles in the films Over the Brooklyn Bridge (1984) and Funny Farm (1988), though her scene in the latter was cut. She obtained a larger role as the daughter of a prostitute in the B thriller High Stakes (1989). In 1989, she shared hosting duties with Soleil Moon Frye and Rod Brogan in the syndicated weekly variety show Girl Talk, based on the board game of the same name. It only produced five episodes.

Gellar made her stage debut in the off-Broadway production The Widow Claire (1986–1987) at the Circle in the Square Theatre. She portrayed 13-year-old Mollie in the initial production of Neil Simon's play Jake's Women, which ran at the Old Globe Theatre in San Diego, California, from March to April 1990. In 1991, she was cast as a young Jacqueline Bouvier in A Woman Named Jackie. The miniseries won the Emmy Award for Outstanding Limited Series. Gellar obtained her first leading role, as a mayor's manipulative daughter, in the 1992 syndicated teen serial Swans Crossing, which chronicled the lives of a group of wealthy teenagers. She felt that playing a "villainous" character gave her the call for "better and more varied acting skills", while the gig's weekly payment proved a financial aid for Gellar and her mother. The series ran for a 65-episode season and earned her two Young Artist Award nominations for Best Young Actress.

Gellar made her debut on the ABC soap opera All My Children in 1993, playing Kendall Hart, the long-lost teenage daughter of character Erica Kane (Susan Lucci). As she got the role, Gellar was complimented as having the acting talent and the "forceful personality" needed to go up against Lucci's experience; Kendall was supposed to be like a younger version of Erica. Her stint on the show was successful as "longtime fans of the soap saw her as the second coming of Erica". Writers showcased her more after her initial reception and she became a household name to the soap opera medium. In 1995, at the age of eighteen, she won a Daytime Emmy Award for Outstanding Younger Actress in a Drama Series for the role. The same year, Gellar left the show and moved to Los Angeles to pursue other acting opportunities. In 1996, she filmed the ABC television film Beverly Hills Family Robinson, in which she played a spoiled adolescent.

=== Worldwide recognition (1997–2003) ===
After reading the script for Joss Whedon's television series Buffy the Vampire Slayer, which follows Buffy Summers, a teenager burdened with the responsibility of fighting occult foes and supernatural occurrences, Gellar screen tested for the role of Cordelia Chase. Whedon then asked her to come back in and audition for the title role. The show premiered in March 1997, to widespread critical and popular acclaim. Gellar's Buffy, created to subvert the stereotypical female horror movie victim, was described by Entertainment Weekly as one of the 100 greatest female characters in American television. Buffy ran for seven seasons and 144 episodes, and during its broadcast, earned Gellar four Teen Choice Awards, the Saturn Award for Best Genre Television Actress, and a Golden Globe Award nomination for Best Actress – Television Series Drama. She sang during the series' musical episode "Once More, with Feeling", which spawned an original cast album, released in 2002.

During the early airing of Buffy the Vampire Slayer, Gellar made her first major film appearances in two successful slasher films. In I Know What You Did Last Summer (1997), she took on the role of ill-fated beauty queen Helen Shivers. Washington Post found the cast to be "solid", in what San Francisco Chronicle described as a "competent but uninspired" film. Budgeted at US$17 million, the film made US$125 million globally. For her part, Gellar earned a Blockbuster Entertainment Award for Favorite Supporting Actress – Horror and an MTV Movie Award nomination for Best Breakthrough Performance. In Scream 2 (1997), Gellar played a likewise ill-fated vain character, this time that of Sorority sister Cici Cooper. She filmed her scenes in between shots of Buffy and had only recently finished work on I Know What You Did Last Summer. Despite the hectic scheduling, she agreed to perform in Scream 2 without having read the script, on the basis of the success of the first film. Scream 2 grossed over US$172 million worldwide.

In January 1998, Gellar hosted Saturday Night Live for the first time. She returned as a host in May 1999 and October 2002, was a participating audience member in its 25th anniversary special, and made two cameo appearances in May 2000, including one in which she introduced Britney Spears' performance of "Don't Let Me Be the Last to Know". In 1998, she also provided her voice for the Gwendy Doll in Small Soldiers, and for the character of Marie in the King of the Hill episode "And They Call It Bobby Love". In 1999, Gellar had a non-speaking cameo as a girl sitting in the high school cafeteria in the sleeper hit She's All That, and obtained her first top-billing film role, as a struggling restaurant owner, in the romantic comedy Simply Irresistible. The film received negative reviews and flopped at the box office, but Roger Ebert found her to be "lovely" in what he described as an "old-fashioned" comedy.

In Roger Kumble's Cruel Intentions (1999), a modern-day retelling of Les Liaisons dangereuses, Gellar portrayed Kathryn Merteuil, a cocaine addict with an appetite for manipulating people. In his review for the film, Ebert felt that she is "effective as a bright girl who knows exactly how to use her act as a tramp", and in an interview with Chicago Tribune, Kumble described her as "the most professional actor I ever worked with". The film was a hit at the box office, grossing US$75 million worldwide, and went on to become a cult classic. Gellar and co-star Selma Blair obtained the Best Kiss award at the 2000 MTV Movie Awards. In Angel, a spin-off series of Buffy the Vampire Slayer, Gellar reprised her titular role for a three-episode arc, starting in 1999.

In 2000, Gellar appeared as a film studio executive in the HBO series Sex and the City episode "Escape from New York". Her next film, James Toback's independent drama Harvard Man (2001), in which she starred as the "sharp and shrewd" daughter of a mobster, helped her shed her good girl image, along with Cruel Intentions, according to Peter Travers of Rolling Stone. In 2002, Gellar portrayed Daphne Blake in the live action–comedy Scooby-Doo. For the production, she trained with a Hong Kong wire team, and commuted between Queensland and California every two weeks due to her simultaneous commitment to Buffy. Despite negative reviews, A. O. Scott of The New York Times felt that her performance added "a snarl of Powerpuff feminism to her character's ditzy stereotype", and with a global gross of US$275 million, Scooby-Doo emerged as Gellar's most widely seen film to date. Her role earned her the Teen Choice Award for Choice Movie Actress – Comedy. With Jack Black, she hosted the 2002 MTV Movie Awards, which attracted 7.1 million viewers on its June 6 broadcast, achieving the show's highest rating ever at the time.

During her growing film career, Gellar continued to work on Buffy the Vampire Slayer, but she decided to leave the series after the seventh season. When asked why, she explained, "This isn't about leaving for a career in movies, or in theater –it's more of a personal decision. I need a rest." In her feature in Esquire magazine, Gellar expressed her pride for her work on Buffy, "I truly believe that it is one of the greatest shows of all time and it will go down in history as that. And I don't feel that that is a cocky statement. We changed the way that people looked at television."

=== Film output (2004–2010) ===
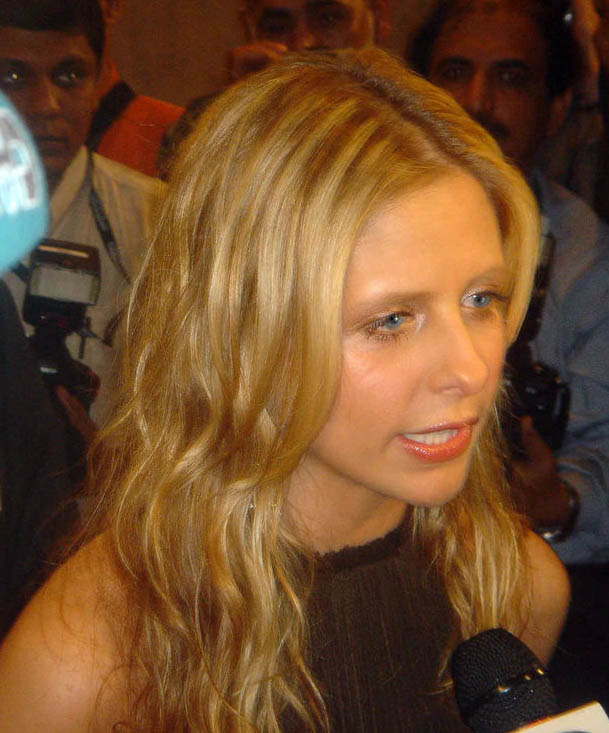
Gellar in 2004

After the end of Buffy the Vampire Slayer, Gellar reprised the role of Daphne in Scooby-Doo 2: Monsters Unleashed (2004). Like the first film, Scooby-Doo 2 was a commercial success despite a negative critical response. In Takashi Shimizu's The Grudge (2004), she portrayed Karen Davis, an exchange student in Tokyo who becomes exposed to a supernatural curse. The film received mixed reviews from critics, but was a major box office hit, grossing more than US$110 million in North America and US$187 million globally. She received a MTV Movie Award nomination for Best Frightened Performance, as well as a Teen Choice Award nomination for Choice Movie Actress – Thriller.

Gellar provided her voice for the character of Gina Vendetti in The Simpsons episode "The Wandering Juvie", which aired in March 2004. From 2005 to 2018, she voiced several recurring characters on the animated television series Robot Chicken. Though she only appeared in 15 episodes, she received a special credit in most episodes, due to her friendship with Seth Green, the series' co-creator. She originally provided voice-over work for the animated educational film Quantum Quest: A Cassini Space Odyssey, but following a lengthy post-production, her role was recast and voiced by Amanda Peet in the final version.

Gellar starred in Richard Kelly's Southland Tales (2006) as a psychic adult film star who creates a reality television series based on prophetic visions. Drawn to the "batshit ambitious" ideas for the film, she accepted the role before she even read the script. Southland Tales polarised critics upon its debut at the 2006 Cannes Film Festival and found a limited audience in theaters. However, J. Hoberman for Village Voice remarked that the director contrived a "memorable" comic performance from Gellar, while the film gathered a cult following in subsequent years. In 2006, Gellar briefly reprised the role of Karen in the sequel The Grudge 2, and starred in Asif Kapadia's psychological thriller The Return, as a businesswoman haunted by memories of her childhood and the mysterious death of a young woman. The Return was a critical and commercial failure, grossing only US$11 million. Jeannette Catsoulis of The New York Times called it a "career stagnation".

In 2007, Gellar voiced Ella and April O'Neil in Happily N'Ever After and TMNT, respectively. She starred in the romantic comedy Suburban Girl and the drama The Air I Breathe, both of which were screened at the 2007 Tribeca Film Festival and released in January 2008. In Suburban Girl, she took on the role of a New York City editor and the love interest of a much older businessman (Alec Baldwin). In The Air I Breathe, Gellar portrayed an up-and-coming pop singer. The New York Times described the latter as a "gangster movie with delusions of grandeur", while DVD Talk noted that "her character here has the deepest emotional arc, and she hits all the right notes."

The psychological thriller Possession, in which Gellar starred as a lawyer whose life is thrown into chaos after a car accident sends her husband and brother-in-law into comas, had a range of release dates in the United States between 2008 and 2009, due to financial problems at Yari Film Group. The film ultimately went to DVD in March 2010. In Veronika Decides to Die, an adaptation of the 1998 novel by Paulo Coelho, Gellar starred as a depressed woman who rediscovers the joy in life when she finds out that she only has days to live following a suicide attempt. Initially released abroad in 2009 and 2010, the film was distributed domestically in January 2015. Frank Scheck of The Hollywood Reporter found the actress to be "reasonably compelling" in what he called a "ponderous and silly misfire".

=== Hiatus and sporadic roles (2011–2020) ===
Gellar took a two-year hiatus from acting following the birth of her daughter in 2009, and in 2011, she signed to star and work as executive producer for the CW's Ringer, in which she played the dual role of twin sisters, one of whom is on the run and manages to hide by assuming the wealthy life of the other. Gellar has stated that part of her decision to return to television was because it allowed her to both work and raise her family. Despite a large fan base, the series received mixed reviews, and was canceled after the first season. For her portrayal, she received several award nominations, including one for the Teen Choice Award for Choice Television Actress – Drama.

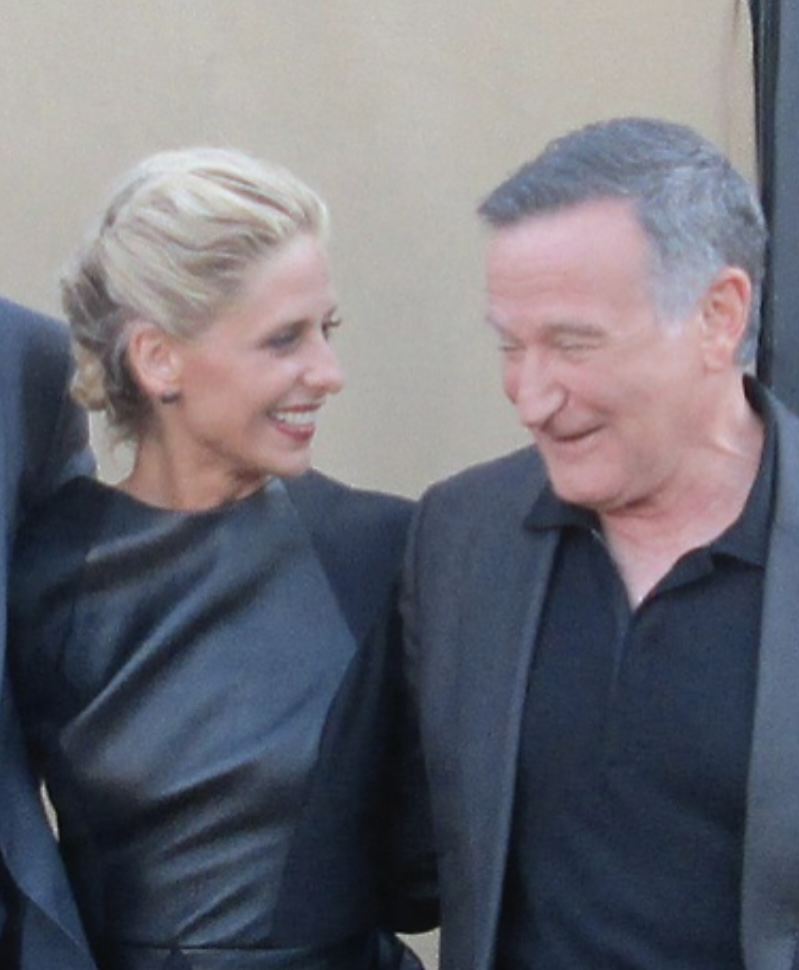
Gellar with Robin Williams at an event for The Crazy Ones in 2013

In September 2011, Gellar returned as a guest star on All My Children before the show's ending but not as Kendall Hart; she portrayed a patient at Pine Valley Hospital who tells Maria Santos that she is "Erica Kane's daughter", and states that she saw vampires before they became trendy—a reference to Buffy the Vampire Slayer. She voiced different characters in the American Dad! episodes "Virtual In-Stanity" and "Adventures in Hayleysitting", which aired in November 2011 and December 2012, respectively. On September 30, 2012, she reprised her role of Gina Vendetti in the premiere episode of The Simpsons' season 24. Her sole film credit during the decade was a voice-over role in an English dub of The Illusionauts (2012).

A fan of Robin Williams for years, once Gellar learned that he was making the CBS single-camera sitcom The Crazy Ones (2013–2014), she contacted her friend Sarah de Sa Rego, the wife of Williams' best friend, Bobcat Goldthwait, in order to lobby for a co-starring role. She obtained the part of an advertising director who runs an agency with her father. Digital Spy felt that Williams "shares a warm, genuine chemistry with his on-screen offspring Gellar," as part of a mixed critical response. The series earned Gellar the People's Choice Award for Favorite Actress in a New Television Series.

Following the conclusion of The Crazy Ones and the death of Williams, Gellar took another sabbatical from screen acting, stating that she had "been working [her] entire life" and "needed that break" to focus on raising her children. During that period, she made an appearance as Cinderella in a March 2015 episode of Whitney Avalon's YouTube channel series Princess Rap Battle, voiced a recurring character known as the Seventh Sister in the second season of the animated science fiction series Star Wars Rebels (2015–2016), and guest starred as herself in the series finale of The Big Bang Theory, which aired on May 16, 2019. Gellar was also attached to several television projects that ultimately were not picked up for production. These included a 2016 pilot for a series based on Cruel Intentions, in which she reprised her role of Kathryn Merteuil.

=== Resurgence (2021–present) ===
In 2021, Gellar voiced Teela in Kevin Smith's Masters of the Universe: Revelation, an animated series for Netflix. In 2022, she made her first live-action film appearances in 13 years with brief roles in Smith's Clerks III and Jennifer Kaytin Robinson's Do Revenge, released in theaters and on Netflix respectively, in the same week. Gellar's part as a headmistress in Do Revenge was specifically written for her, with her own input, as a tribute to her Cruel Intentions character. Despite her three-minute screen time, it was described as a "sizeable" role by Alison Stine of Salon.com. Evan Romano of Men's Health considered it a "brilliant move to let audiences know [that] this movie belongs."

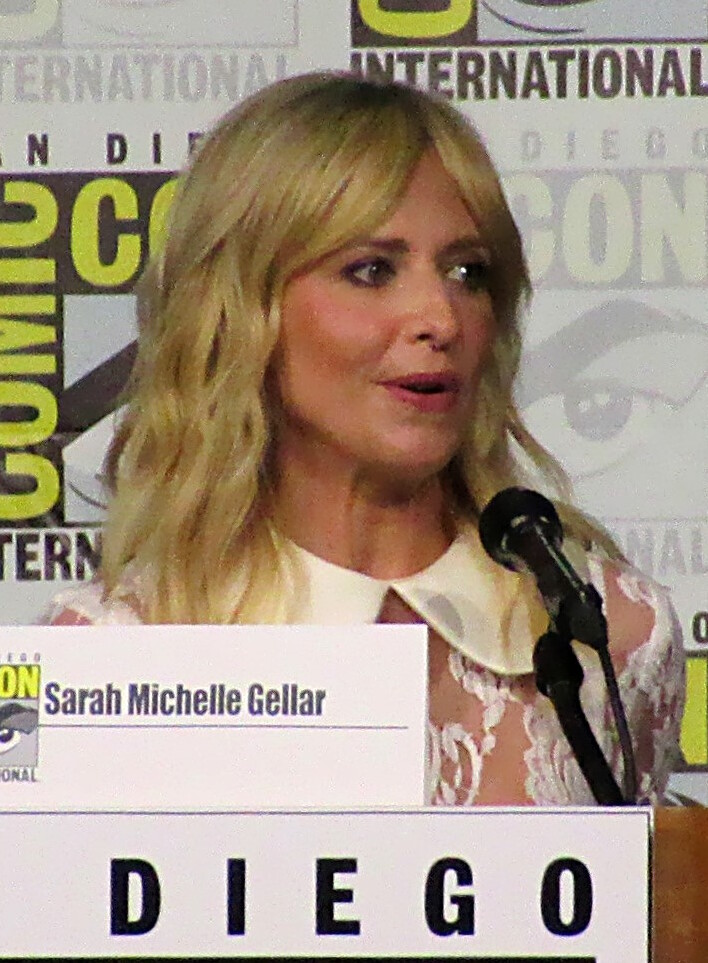
Gellar at the 2024 San Diego Comic-Con

Gellar starred as an arson investigator in the Paramount+ supernatural drama series Wolf Pack (2023), for which she also served as an executive producer. Critics praised her performance but found the series to be "bereft of a voice". In another Paramount+ production, the prequel series Dexter: Original Sin (2024–2025), she played a forensics expert and the title character's boss. She made a cameo appearance as Helen Shivers, during a dream sequence, in Robinson's sequel I Know What You Did Last Summer (2025).

After serving as a guest judge on RuPaul's Drag Race in 2024 and on RuPaul's Drag Race All Stars in 2025, Gellar signed on as a main judge on the Netflix revival of Star Search, which premiered on January 20, 2026. She appeared in the comedy horror sequel Ready or Not 2: Here I Come; provided her voice for Breaking Bear, an adult animated series on Tubi; and was set to reprise her role as Buffy Summers and serve as an executive producer of an upcoming Buffy series before Hulu announced on March 14, 2026 that it was not moving forward.

In June 2026, Gellar was announced to have signed on to the film 'Thud'. The film is being produced by Radio Silence Productions and Divide/Conquer.

== Other ventures ==
=== Activism and philanthropy ===
Gellar has been an active advocate for various charities, including breast cancer research, Project Angel Food, Habitat for Humanity and CARE. Of her charitable pursuits, she said: "I started because my mother taught me a long time ago that even when you have nothing, there's ways to give back. And what you get in return for that is tenfold. But it was always hard because I couldn't do a lot. I couldn't do much more than just donate money when I was on [Buffy] because there wasn't time. And now that I have the time, it's amazing."

In 1999, Gellar helped Habitat for Humanity's project of building homes in Dominican Republic. The foundation stated in 2011 that she sponsored the construction of a house each year in Guatemala. With Project Angel Food, she delivered healthy meals to people infected with AIDS, and through the Make-A-Wish Foundation, she granted sick children's wishes of meeting her while working on Buffy. In 2007, Gellar was featured in Vaseline's Skin Is Amazing campaign, in which she agreed to auction nude-posed photos of herself on eBay to raise money for the Coalition of Skin Diseases, an organization which supports clinical research, fosters physician and patient education. In 2008, she visited Guatemala and Tanzania to promote women's education as an ambassador for CARE.

In 2011, Gellar joined The Nestlé Share the Joy of Reading Program, which promotes reading to young children. The following year, she was presented with the Tom Mankiewicz Leadership Award during the Beastly Ball at the Los Angeles Zoo. In 2013, she hosted the Kidstock Music and Art Festival, an event that benefited the One Voice Scholars Program. In 2014 and 2015, Gellar hosted two fundraisers for Mattel Children's Hospital UCLA. In 2021, she promoted Subaru of America's donation of 100 million meals to Feeding America. In 2025, Gellar curated with eBay a one-day-only pop-up, The '95 Shop, with proceeds going to the Make-A-Wish Foundation. That year, she collaborated with Alyson Hannigan in GSK's Ask2BSure campaign, to raise awareness about meningitis and encourage vaccination among teens.

=== Business and media ===
Gellar has graced the covers of numerous magazines throughout her career. She appeared on the August 2–8, 1997 cover of TV Guide and the February 1998 cover of Seventeen. The list went on to include Nylon, Marie Claire, Glamour, Esquire, Allure, Cosmopolitan, FHM, Rolling Stone, and Elle, among others. Wearing a black lace bra, she was on the cover of the December 2007 issue of Maxim. She was featured on the cover of Gotham and their main story in the March 2008 issue.

In 1999, Gellar signed on to be the face of Maybelline, becoming the company's first celebrity spokeswoman since Lynda Carter in the late 1970s. She has appeared in advertisements for Got Milk?, Proactiv, Colgate, Cascade, and Coolsculpting. Drawing on her background in horror films, Gellar has starred several genre-inspired promotional campaigns, such as Killer Skin, a commercial for Olay that aired during the Super Bowl LIII, Blizzard Entertainment's Vampire Hunters Wanted fan-contest for Diablo IV in 2023, Philosophy's Rated R in 2024, and Uber One's I Know What You Could've Saved Last Summer and Turo's 10 Days of Slay in 2025. She also appeared in the music videos for Green Apple Quick Step's "Kid" (1997), Bree Sharp's "David Duchovny" (1999), and Stone Temple Pilots' "Sour Girl" (2000).

In October 2015, Gellar, along with entrepreneurs Galit Laibow and Greg Fleishman, co-founded Foodstirs, a startup food crafting brand that sold easy-to-make organic baking mixes and kits for families through e-commerce and retail. By 2018, the brand's products were sold at 7,500 retailers nationwide, including Starbucks, Whole Foods, Walmart, WW and Amazon. By 2022, Foodstirs had ceased operations, and Gellar sold off her remaining stake in the company.

Gellar's cookbook, Stirring up Fun with Food, was published on April 18, 2017, by Grand Central Publishing. It was co-authored by Gia Russo, and features numerous food crafting ideas.

== Legacy ==
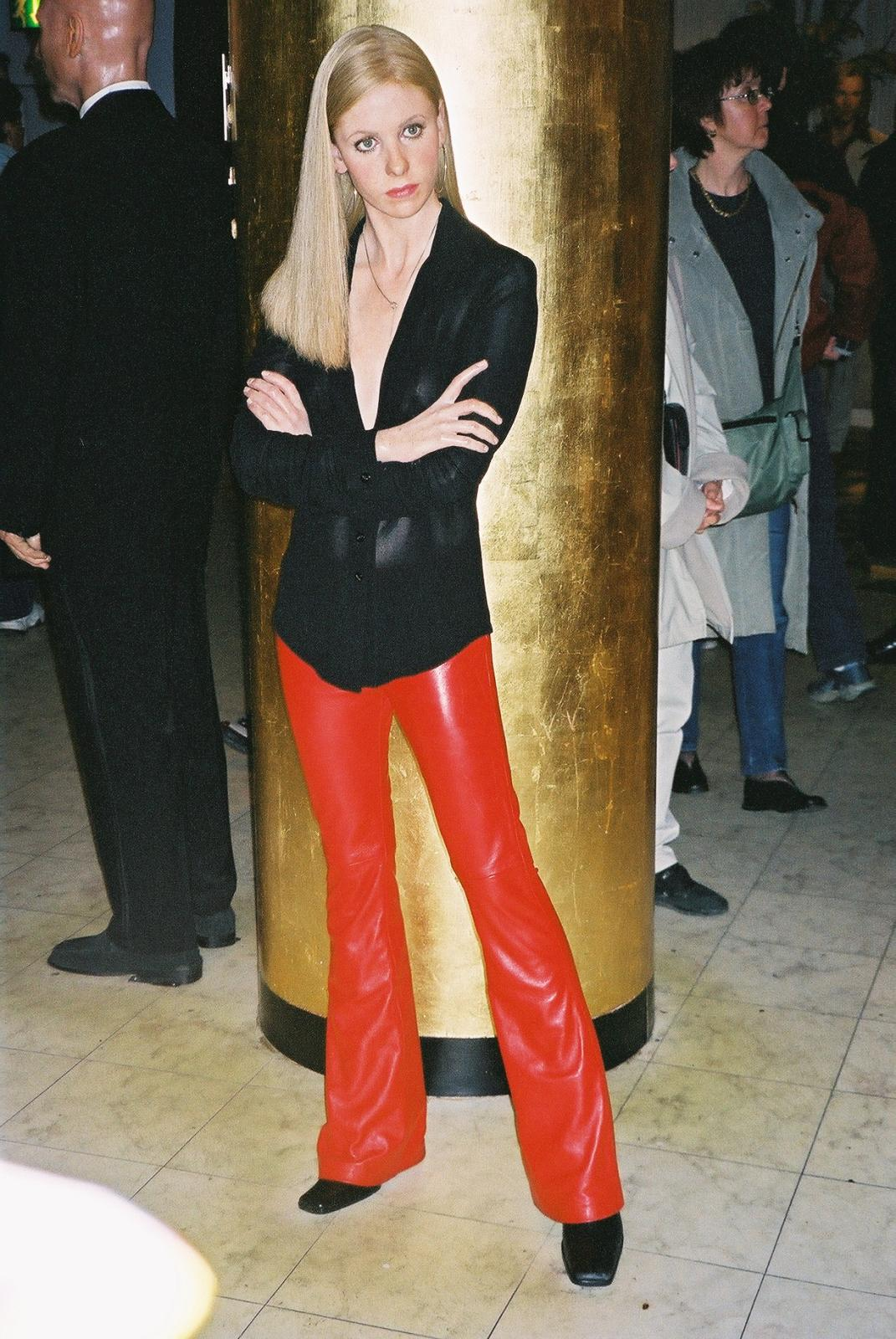
Gellar's wax figure at Madame Tussauds

Known for often playing characters with "strength, sensitivity and snark" in the horror genre, Gellar has been viewed as a "scream queen" throughout the majority of her career. She has stated that horror offers actresses "the best roles" through which they "can really shine", and that it is in television where "women are the stars, but in films we're still struggling to play the leads". Thus, she feels that she "couldn't just be the girlfriend or the wife in a film". She has said: "So I'll be wherever the good female roles are. I like horror." Writing for Bloody Disgusting, Alex DiVincenzo asserted that "Buffy the Vampire Slayer alone should be enough to cement her horror icon status", and highlighting some of her roles in the genre, observed: "Regardless of whether they made it to the end credits, her characters were intelligent, resourceful, and empowering." She has ranked 6th among "The All Time Greatest Horror Scream Queens" by CinemaBlend, 4th among the "9 Greatest Scream Queens in All of Horror" by Syfy, and 8th among the "10 Best Scream Queens of the '90s" by Screen Rant.

By the late 1990s, Gellar had become a household name, as well as one of Hollywood's "It Girls". In 1998, she appeared on Entertainment Weekly's Top 12 Entertainers of the Year and the "Most Beautiful" list by People magazine. In 1999, she was voted number one in FHM's "100 Sexiest Women" of the year. She was featured in the magazine's German, Dutch, South African, Danish and Romanian editions of the list. Topsocialite.com listed her as the 8th Sexiest woman of the 1990s.

In 2002, Gellar was honored with a Woman of the Year Award by Glamour magazine, and her wax figure by Madame Tussauds, was unveiled as part of the "Trail of Vampires" exhibition. Between 2002 and 2008, she was featured on the annual Maxim "Hot 100" list. The magazine named her the 2008 Woman of the Year. She was also featured in Google's Top 10 Women Searches of 2002 and 2003, coming in at No. 8, and was included in UK Channel 4's 100 Greatest Sex Symbols in 2007, ranking at No. 16. Other appearances and listings include Glamour's 50 Best Dressed Women in the World in 2004 and 2005, Entertainment Weekly's Top 100 TV Icons in 2007, and BuddyTV's 100 Sexiest Women of 2011.

In 2026, Gellar was announced as an inductee into the Hollywood Walk of Fame.

== Personal life ==
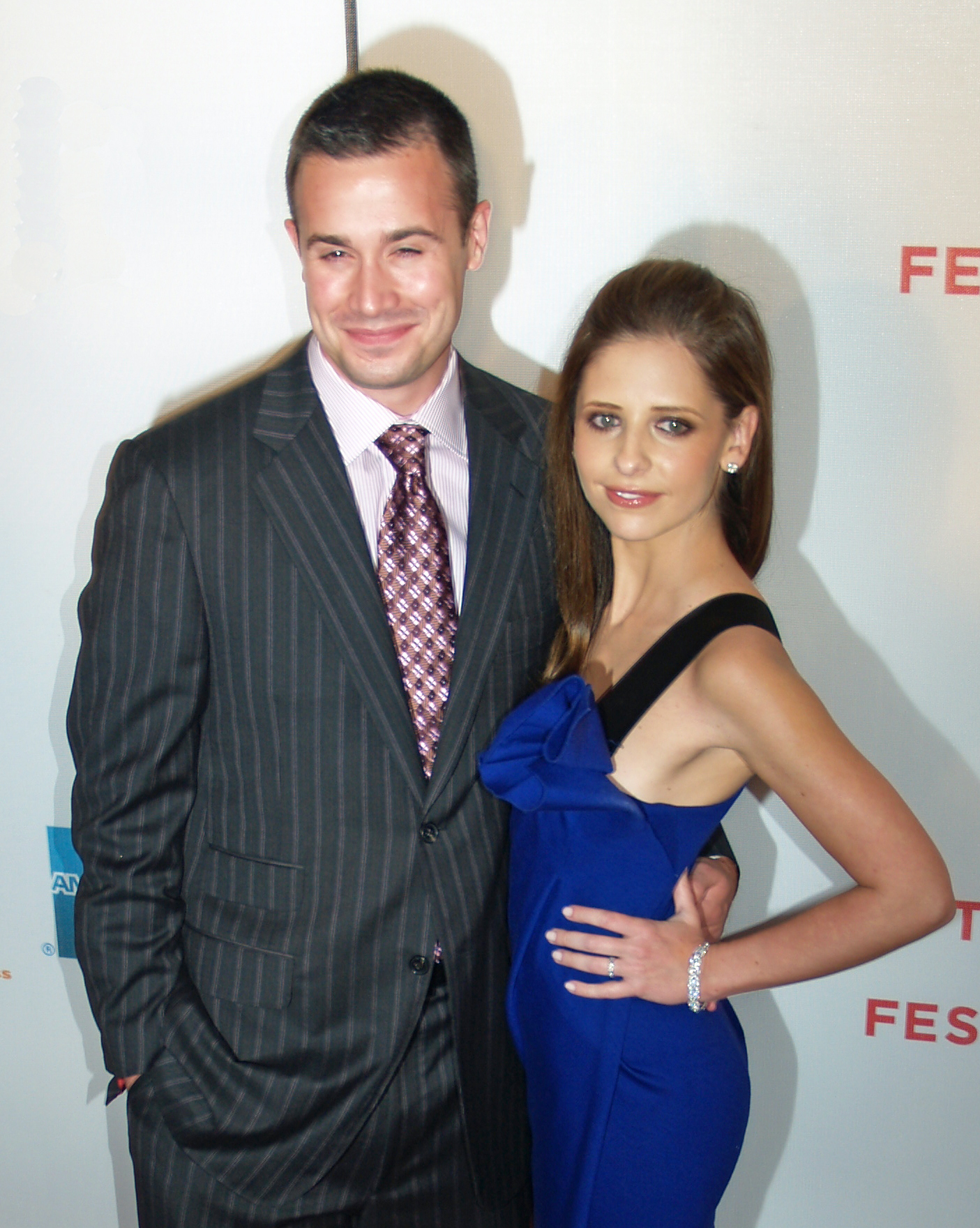
Gellar with her husband Freddie Prinze Jr. in 2007

Gellar met her husband, Freddie Prinze Jr., while they were filming the 1997 teen horror film I Know What You Did Last Summer, but the two did not begin dating until 2000. She and Prinze have worked together several times, including when they played each other's respective love interests as Fred and Daphne in Scooby-Doo and Scooby-Doo 2: Monsters Unleashed. They were engaged in April 2001 and married in Mexico on September 1, 2002, in a ceremony officiated by Adam Shankman, a director and choreographer with whom Gellar had worked on Buffy the Vampire Slayer. In 2007, in honor of their fifth year of marriage, Gellar legally changed her name to Sarah Michelle Prinze. Together, she and Prinze have two children. The family lives in Los Angeles.

On February 10, 2021, Gellar expressed support for her Buffy the Vampire Slayer co-star Charisma Carpenter after Carpenter made allegations of abuse against series creator Joss Whedon. She also stated, "While I am proud to have my name associated with Buffy Summers, I don't want to be forever associated with the name Joss Whedon." In an interview with The Hollywood Reporter published January 18, 2023, Gellar is quoted as saying, "I'll never tell my full story because I don't get anything out of it."

== Filmography ==
Key
†	Denotes films that have not yet been released

=== Film ===
Year	Title	Role	Notes	Ref.
1984	Over the Brooklyn Bridge	Phil's daughter	Uncredited	
1988	Funny Farm	Elizabeth's student	Uncredited; deleted scene	
1989	High Stakes	Karen Rose	Credited as Sarah Gellar	
1997	I Know What You Did Last Summer	Helen Shivers		
1997	Scream 2	Cici Cooper		
1998	Small Soldiers	Gwendy Doll	Voice role	
1999	Cruel Intentions	Kathryn Merteuil		
1999	She's All That	Girl in cafeteria	Special thanks	
1999	Simply Irresistible	Amanda Shelton		
2001	Harvard Man	Cindy Bandolini		
2002	Scooby-Doo	Daphne Blake		
2003	Mayor of the Sunset Strip	Herself	Cameo; documentary	
2004	Scooby-Doo 2: Monsters Unleashed	Daphne Blake		
2004	The Grudge	Karen Davis		
2006	Southland Tales	Krysta Now		
2006	The Grudge 2	Karen Davis	Cameo	
2006	The Return	Joanna Mills		
2007	Happily N'Ever After	Princess Ella	Voice role	
2007	TMNT	April O'Neil	Voice role	
2007	Suburban Girl	Brett Eisenberg		
2007	The Air I Breathe	Trista • Sorrow		
2009	Possession	Jess		
2009	Veronika Decides to Die	Veronika Deklava		
2012	The Illusionauts	Nicole	Voice role; English dub	
2022	Clerks III	Auditioner 2	Cameo	
2022	Do Revenge	The Headmistress		
2025	I Know What You Did Last Summer	Helen Shivers	Cameo	
2026	Ready or Not 2: Here I Come	Ursula Danforth		
2026	Stop! That! Train!	Famous Actress		
TBA	Thud †	Grim Reaper	Post-production	

=== Television ===
Year	Title	Role	Notes	Ref.
1982	Love, Sidney	Gail Hunnicut	Episode: "Sidney's Spree"	
1982; 1985	Late Night with David Letterman	Herself • Suzy Walker	2 episodes	
1983	An Invasion of Privacy	Jennifer Bianchi	Television film	
1985	Guiding Light	Flower girl	Episode dated November 8	
1988	Crossbow	Sara Guidotti	Episode: "Actors"	
1988	Spenser: For Hire	Emily	Episode: "Company Man"	
1989	Girl Talk	Herself	Host; 5 episodes	
1991	A Woman Named Jackie	Teenage Jacqueline Bouvier	Miniseries	
1992	Swans Crossing	Sydney Orion Rutledge	Main role	
1993–1995; 2011	All My Children	Kendall Hart • Hospital patient	Main and guest roles	
1997	Beverly Hills Family Robinson	Jane Robinson	Television film	
1997–2003	Buffy the Vampire Slayer	Buffy Summers	Main role	
1998–2002	Saturday Night Live	Herself	5 episodes (3 as host, 2 as uncredited performer)	
1998	King of the Hill	Marie	Voice; episode: "And They Call It Bobby Love"	
1999	Saturday Night Live 25th Anniversary Special	Herself	Participating audience member	
1999	Divas Live '99	Herself	Presenter	
1999–2000	Angel	Buffy Summers	3 episodes	
2000	Sex and the City	Debbie	Episode: "Escape from New York"	
2001	Grosse Pointe	Herself	Episode: "Passion Fish"	
2002	MTV Movie Awards	Herself	Host and performer	
2002	Cancun Capers	Herself	Host; television special	
2002; 2004	HBO First Look	Herself	2 episodes	
2004; 2012	The Simpsons	Gina Vendetti	2 episodes	
2005–2018	Robot Chicken	Various voices	Recurring appearances	
2010	The Wonderful Maladys	Alice Malady	Unaired pilot; also executive producer	
2011–2012	American Dad!	Phyllis • Jenny	Voices; 2 episodes	
2011–2012	Ringer	Bridget Kelly • Siobhan Martin	Main role; also executive producer	
2011	God, the Devil and Bob	That Actress on That Show	Voice; episode: "There's Too Much Sex on TV"	
2013–2014	The Crazy Ones	Sydney Roberts	Main role	
2014	Sesame Street	Herself	Episode: "Grandparents Celebration"	
2015–2016	Star Wars Rebels	Seventh Sister	Voice; 6 episodes	
2016	Cruel Intentions	Kathryn Merteuil	Unaired pilot; also executive producer	
2016	Those Who Can't	Gwen Stephanie	Episode: "The Fairbell Tape"	
2016	Chopped Junior	Herself	Guest judge; episode: "Dough Business"	
2016	Attention Deficit Theatre	—	Executive producer	
2019	The Big Bang Theory	Herself	Episode: "The Stockholm Syndrome"	
2021	Masters of the Universe: Revelation	Teela	Voice; main role	
2023	Wolf Pack	Kristin Ramsey	Main role; also executive producer	
2024	RuPaul's Drag Race	Herself	Guest judge; episode: "RDR Live!"	
2024–2025	Dexter: Original Sin	Tanya Martin	Special guest star	
2025	RuPaul's Drag Race All Stars	Herself	Guest judge; episode: "Snatch Game"	
2025	Buffy the Vampire Slayer: New Sunnydale	Buffy Summers	Unaired pilot; also executive producer	
2026	Star Search	Herself	Main judge	
2026	Breaking Bear	Blair	Voice; main role	

=== Music videos ===
Year	Title	Role	Artist	Ref.
1997	"Kid"	Helen Shivers	Green Apple Quick Step	
1999	"David Duchovny"	Herself	Bree Sharp	
2000	"Sour Girl"	Love interest	Stone Temple Pilots	
2022	"Taste So Good (The Cann Song)"	Herself	Vincint	

=== Other ===
Year	Title	Role	Format	Ref.
1982	A Very Big Message	Herself	Burger King commercial	
1986–1987	The Widow Claire	Claire's daughter	Off-Broadway production	
1990	Jake's Women	13-year-old Mollie	Off-Broadway production	
2011	Call of Duty: Black Ops	Herself	Call of Duty: Zombies – Call of the Dead DLC Map	
2015	Princess Rap Battle	Cinderella	YouTube series; episode: "Cinderella vs. Belle"	
2019	Killer Skin	Georgia Cunningham	Olay commercial for Super Bowl LIII	
2020	An Evening of Intrigue: Choose Your Apothic Journey	Herself	Apothic Wines virtual reading	

== Soundtrack appearances ==
Year	Album	Track	Label	Ref.
2002	Once More, with Feeling	"Overture" • "Going Through the Motions"	Rounder Records	
2002	Once More, with Feeling	"I've Got a Theory" • "Bunnies" • "If We're Together"	Rounder Records	
2002	Once More, with Feeling	"Walk Through the Fire"	Rounder Records	
2002	Once More, with Feeling	"Something to Sing About"	Rounder Records	
2002	Once More, with Feeling	"Where Do We Go from Here?"	Rounder Records	
2002	Once More, with Feeling	"Coda"	Rounder Records	
2007	Southland Tales	"Teen Horniness Is Not a Crime"	Milan Records	

== Bibliography ==
- Gellar, Sarah Michelle; Russo, Gia (2017). Stirring Up Fun with Food. Grand Central Publishing. ISBN 978-1455538744.

== Awards and nominations ==
Awards and nominations received by Sarah Michelle Gellar
Year	Award	Category	Nominated work	Result	Ref.
1993	Young Artist Awards	Best Young Actress in a New Television Series	Swans Crossing	Nominated	
1993	Young Artist Awards	Best Young Actress in an Off-Primetime Series	Swans Crossing	Nominated	
1994	Daytime Emmy Awards	Outstanding Younger Actress in a Drama Series	All My Children	Nominated	
1994	Young Artist Awards	Best Youth Actress in a Soap Opera	All My Children	Nominated	
1995	Daytime Emmy Awards	Outstanding Younger Actress in a Drama Series	All My Children	Won	
1995	Young Artist Awards	Best Performance by a Youth Actress in a Daytime Series	All My Children	Nominated	
1998	Blockbuster Entertainment Awards	Favorite Supporting Actress – Horror	I Know What You Did Last Summer	Won	
1998	MTV Movie Awards	Best Breakthrough Performance	I Know What You Did Last Summer	Nominated	
1998	Saturn Awards	Best Actress on Television	Buffy the Vampire Slayer	Nominated	
1999	Kids' Choice Awards	Favorite Television Actress	Buffy the Vampire Slayer	Nominated	
1999	Saturn Awards	Best Genre Television Actress	Buffy the Vampire Slayer	Won	
1999	Teen Choice Awards	Choice Movie Villain	Cruel Intentions	Won	
1999	Teen Choice Awards	Choice Television Actress	Buffy the Vampire Slayer	Won	
1999	Young Artist Awards	Best Performance in a Television Series (Comedy or Drama) – Leading Young Actress	Buffy the Vampire Slayer	Nominated	
2000	Kids' Choice Awards	Favorite Television Friends (shared with David Boreanaz)	Buffy the Vampire Slayer	Nominated	
2000	MTV Movie Awards	Best Kiss (shared with Selma Blair)	Cruel Intentions	Won	
2000	MTV Movie Awards	Best Performance – Female	Cruel Intentions	Won	
2000	MTV Movie Awards	Best Villain	Cruel Intentions	Nominated	
2000	Saturn Awards	Best Actress on Television	Buffy the Vampire Slayer	Nominated	
2000	Teen Choice Awards	Choice Television Actress	Buffy the Vampire Slayer	Won	
2001	Golden Globe Awards	Best Performance by an Actress in a Television Series – Drama	Buffy the Vampire Slayer	Nominated	
2001	Kids' Choice Awards	Favorite Television Actress	Buffy the Vampire Slayer	Nominated	
2001	Saturn Awards	Best Actress on Television	Buffy the Vampire Slayer	Nominated	
2001	Teen Choice Awards	Choice Television Actress	Buffy the Vampire Slayer	Nominated	
2001	Teen Choice Awards	Extraordinary Achievement Award	Buffy the Vampire Slayer	Won	
2001	Television Critics Association Awards	Individual Achievement in Drama	Buffy the Vampire Slayer	Nominated	
2002	Kids' Choice Awards	Favorite Female Butt Kicker	Buffy the Vampire Slayer	Won	
2002	Saturn Awards	Best Actress in a Television Series	Buffy the Vampire Slayer	Nominated	
2002	SFX Awards	Best Television Actress	Buffy the Vampire Slayer	Won	
2002	Teen Choice Awards	Choice Movie: Chemistry (shared with Freddie Prinze Jr.)	Scooby-Doo	Nominated	
2002	Teen Choice Awards	Choice Movie Actress – Comedy	Scooby-Doo	Won	
2002	Teen Choice Awards	Choice Television Actress – Drama	Buffy the Vampire Slayer	Won	
2002	Young Hollywood Awards	Hottest, Coolest Young Veteran – Female	Buffy the Vampire Slayer	Won	
2003	Kids' Choice Awards	Favorite Female Butt Kicker	Buffy the Vampire Slayer	Nominated	
2003	Satellite Awards	Best Actress – Television Series Drama	Buffy the Vampire Slayer	Nominated	
2003	Saturn Awards	Best Actress in a Television Series	Buffy the Vampire Slayer	Nominated	
2003	Teen Choice Awards	Choice Television Actress – Drama	Buffy the Vampire Slayer	Won	
2004	Saturn Awards	Best Actress in a Television Series	Buffy the Vampire Slayer	Nominated	
2004	SFX Awards	Best Television Actress	Buffy the Vampire Slayer	Won	
2005	MTV Movie Awards	Best Frightened Performance	The Grudge	Nominated	
2005	Teen Choice Awards	Choice Movie Actress – Thriller	The Grudge	Nominated	
2011	Virgin Media TV Award (United Kingdom)	Best Actress	Ringer	Nominated	
2011	EW Entertainers of the Year	Favorite Television Actress	Ringer	Nominated	
2012	Teen Choice Awards	Choice Television Actress – Drama	Ringer	Nominated	
2014	People's Choice Awards	Favorite Actress in a New Television Series	The Crazy Ones	Won	
2022	Online Film and Television Association	Television Hall of Fame	Buffy the Vampire Slayer	Won	
2023	Savannah College of Art and Design TVfest	Icon Award	—N/a	Won	
2023	Canneseries	Canal+ Icon Award	—N/a	Won	
