= The X-Files: Resist or Serve =

2004 video game

- North American box art
- Developer: Black Ops Entertainment
- Publisher: Vivendi Universal Games (Note: Released under the Sierra Entertainment label in Europe.)
- Producer: Kirk Lambert
- Designer: Kirk Lambert
- Programmer: Heather Barclay
- Writer: Tom Schnauz
- Composer: Mark Snow
- Series: The X-Files
- Platform: PlayStation 2
- Release: NA: March 16, 2004; EU: May 21, 2004
- Genre: Survival horror
- Mode: Single-player

The X-Files: Resist or Serve is a 2004 survival horror game developed by Black Ops Entertainment and published by Vivendi Universal Games for the PlayStation 2. It is the third video game based on the television series The X-Files, after The X-Files: Unrestricted Access (1997) and The X-Files Game (1998). The game is set during the seventh season of the television series, and the story is presented as three new "episodes" in which FBI Special Agents Fox Mulder and Dana Scully investigate mysterious deaths in Colorado, where they learn about an alien artifact used to resurrect deceased people. The agents' investigation ultimately leads them to Tunguska, Russia, where they discover a spaceship that crashed there nearly 100 years earlier.

The game was announced in December 2002, with its release initially scheduled for the second quarter of 2003, to coincide with the DVD release of the seventh season. Thomas Schnauz, who wrote two episodes of the series, was hired to write the script for the game. Characters from the series who are featured in the game were portrayed by their original actors through voice acting. Music from the series, composed by Mark Snow, was also used in the game. In North America, Vivendi Universal Games published the game for the PlayStation 2 in March 2004 and later released the game in Europe two months later. An Xbox version had initially been planned, but was later cancelled.

The game was advertised as being three lost episodes from the series' seventh season, and received mixed and average reviews. Critics compared The X-Files: Resist or Serve to the Resident Evil game series for using similar gameplay. The game received praise for its story and writing, as well as its voice acting and music. However, criticism was received for the game's graphics, poor controls, and problematic fixed-camera angles, which change with each new area that the player enters.

== Plot ==
The game is set during the television series' seventh season, after the season's second episode, "The Sixth Extinction II: Amor Fati". Other episodes made reference to in the game include the seventh season's third and fourth episodes, "Hungry" and "Millennium". The game is divided across three levels, which are presented as new "episodes" titled "Renascence", "Resonance", and "Reckoning". Each level begins with the series' opening credits sequence.

=== "Renascence" ===
A spacecraft crashes in Tunguska, Russia on June 30, 1908, resulting in the release of the "black oil" alien virus. The crash kills a Russian couple, and the virus infects their baby. In the present day, 15-year-old twin sisters Katlyn and Mandy Winslow have disappeared from their hometown of Red Falls, Colorado, but they reappear two weeks later, coinciding with three mysterious deaths that are believed to have been committed by a man who died in a drunk-driving crash 24 hours prior to the murders. Most of the residents believe that the girls, who are practitioners of witchcraft, revived the murder suspect so he could commit the killings.

FBI Special Agents Fox Mulder (voiced by David Duchovny) and Dana Scully (voiced by Gillian Anderson) are sent to Red Falls to investigate the murders. The agents split up upon their arrival and encounter zombies. Mulder eventually finds the body of Mandy Winslow, hung in the town center. The agents reunite, and Mulder is later bitten by a zombie. Scully, who is also a medical doctor, performs an autopsy on the zombie and creates an antidote to save Mulder from the effects of the bite wound. The agents locate Katlyn Winslow, who subsequently flees from them and is later found dead.

The agents infiltrate the nearby Briar Lake mental institution, where they discover vials of black oil and learn that the Winslows were the subject of science experiments due to the fact that they shared a psychic connection. They also discover clones of the Winslow girls, and encounter Alex Krycek (voiced by Nicholas Lea), who tells them that the clones are using powers to release an alien artifact. Krycek escapes, and the artifact is taken by a ghostly entity, while Mulder and Scully are forced by soldiers to evacuate the city on board a helicopter. The soldiers decline to specify who sent them. From the air, the agents notice Red Falls is now in fiery ruins as part of a cover-up. Mulder is dissatisfied with the lack of evidence to present for the investigation, but Scully reveals that she obtained an optical disc from Briar Lake, which she hopes will provide further information.

=== "Resonance" ===
It is revealed that Krycek is working with The Smoking Man (voiced by William B. Davis). During a briefing with assistant director Walter Skinner (voiced by Mitch Pileggi) at FBI headquarters, Mulder informs him that the alien artifact is what revived the deceased. Skinner tells them that he managed to get the initial three Red Falls murder victims transported to the FBI Academy for Scully to examine. The agents meet with The Lone Gunmen (Byers, Frohike, and Langley; voiced by Bruce Harwood, Tom Braidwood, and Dean Haglund), who have decrypted the Briar Lake data disc and found that it contains information written in Russian. The disc includes references to Tunguska, where Mulder had previously been exposed to the black oil. Mulder contacts Marita Covarrubias (voiced by Laurie Holden) to see if she can aid him in the investigation; she tells him that she will see what she can do.

Mulder suffers hallucinations at his apartment, as the result of poisoning from cosmic galactic radiation, after being near the alien artifact. During his hallucinations, Mulder sees his long-lost sister Samantha, before encountering a ghostly entity in the form of a man. Mulder is saved after Covarrubias injects him with a shot to counteract the radiation poisoning. Scully also suffers from radiation after performing an autopsy on one of the Red Falls victims, but is able to cure herself after creating an antidote.

Covarrubias has arranged for Mulder to fly to Tunguska, while Scully – with help from The Lone Gunmen – investigates Roush Biotechnologies, a company that was referenced in the data disc. Roush funded the experiments at Briar Lake, and bodies from the mental institution are believed to have been sent to the company's facility. Scully and Byers enter the facility disguised as scientists. Langley stays outside the facility, while Frohike covertly infiltrates the building's ventilation so he can tap into the company's fiber optic cable system, allowing Langley to monitor the security footage and help Scully and Byers progress through the building. Scully obtains a piece of the alien artifact, and discovers a disc containing images of Mulder undergoing a brain surgery.

=== "Reckoning" ===
Mulder's plane has crashed in Tunguska, leaving him as the sole survivor. Mulder is later contacted by Covarrubias, who informs him that Scully has arrived in a helicopter. Covarrubias urges Mulder to leave, stating that Krycek and The Smoking Man are in Tunguska. Covarrubias had been working with the men to lead Mulder to Tunguska in hopes that he would locate the alien spaceship that crashed there nearly 100 years earlier. After Covarrubias betrayed the two men, Krycek locked her up. Mulder locates The Smoking Man, but is knocked unconscious by Krycek. While unconscious, Mulder has another vision of the ghostly being, before being awoken by Scully. The agents locate Covarrubias, and she informs them that the ghostly entity is a conduit for the power released by the alien artifact. The agents lose sight of Covarrubias after an explosion.

The helicopter crashes after the pilot becomes a zombie. Mulder and Scully then use a truck to reach old ruins in a Siberian forest. Krycek and his team have begun draining a nearby lake to find the wreckage of the spaceship, located underneath additional ruins that are hidden under the water. Mulder is separated from Scully after a creature attacks their raft. Mulder encounters The Smoking Man, who tells him that to discover the truth, he must follow the advice of "resist or serve," relating to the entity.

Inside an old monastery, Scully attaches the fragment of the alien artifact to its main piece, which summons the entity, who now has the appearance of an elderly man, approximately 90 to 100 years old. Scully defeats the entity, and deduces that he must have alien physiology which makes his connection to the artifact possible. Mulder locates the spaceship and encounters aliens, as well as the entity, in his younger form. After defeating the entity, Mulder reunites with Scully, and the spaceship flies away before she can see it. The agents present their final report to FBI directors, including Skinner and Alvin Kersh (voiced by James Pickens Jr.), who find the agents' story to be unbelievable.

== Gameplay ==
Autopsy sequence where Scully prepares to investigate a corpse.

The X-Files: Resist or Serve is a survival horror game played from a third-person perspective that is viewed by the player through fixed camera angles that change as the character enters each new area. The player chooses to play as either Mulder or Scully; both go through most of the same locations, but they encounter different obstacles and characters that result in a different gameplay experience.

A total of five guns can be used throughout the game, as well as other weapons such as molotov cocktails. Additionally, the player may use a flashlight to stun enemies and easily locate items in the environment that are needed to progress through the game. Also located throughout each level is gun ammunition and items that can replenish the player's health. Items and ammunition are sometimes carried by enemies, who must be killed before the item can be obtained by the player. Weapons, ammunition, and other items are stored in an inventory.

Boss enemies are encountered in each level and must be killed by the player before proceeding. Puzzles must also be solved to progress through the game. Throughout the game, Mulder and Scully write notes about their investigation that may be viewed by the player at any time. Playing as Scully, the player is sometimes tasked with performing autopsies on bodies or with creating antidotes for toxins.

== Development and release ==
In December 2002, it was confirmed that Black Ops Entertainment was developing an X-Files video game, to be released for the PlayStation 2 and Xbox in the second quarter of 2003. The game's title was announced the following month, with plans to release the game simultaneously with the DVD release of the series' seventh season in spring 2003. By March 2003, the game's release date had been rescheduled for September 2003. The Xbox and PlayStation 2 versions were to be released simultaneously, but the Xbox version was later cancelled. As of May 2003, the game's release date was scheduled for October 2003.

Thomas Schnauz, who wrote two episodes for the series during its final two years, was hired to write the script for the game, while Whitney Edwards, Gennifer Hutchison, and Jen Johnson served as additional writers. Heather Barclay was the game's lead programmer, while Kirk Lambert served as the lead designer and producer. Tommy Tallarico was the game's audio director. The X-Files: Resist or Serve was developed using a game engine that was created specifically for the game. Various in-jokes and references to the television series were added into the game. Ben Borth, an associate producer and storyboard artist for the game, said, "We wanted to present more of a classic 'X-Files' game experience."

The game features Mark Snow's music from The X-Files series, as well as voice acting by each of the show's main actors. Additionally, bonuses in the game include commentaries from the series and "behind the scenes" footage, which includes several of the male actors recording their lines while wearing bright red lipstick, a common practice used to get better enunciation and crisper sound. The actors recorded their lines during the 2002 holiday season. Borth stated that scheduling the actors' voice-over sessions during that time was one of the biggest obstacles in creating the game. Anderson's lines were recorded in London, where she was starring in a play, while Duchovny's lines were recorded in Los Angeles.

The X-Files: Resist or Serve was published by Vivendi Universal Games in North America on March 16, 2004. In Europe, the game was released under the Sierra Entertainment label on May 21, 2004. The game was advertised as being three lost episodes from the series' seventh season.

== Reception ==
Reception

Aggregate scores
| Aggregator | Score |
|---|---|
| GameRankings | 66% |
| Metacritic | 67/100 |

Review scores
| Publication | Score |
|---|---|
| Computer and Video Games | 6.3/10 |
| Game Informer | 6.5/10 |
| GameSpot | 7.6/10 |
| GameSpy | 3/5 |
| GameZone | 5/10 |
| IGN | 6.7/10 |
| Official U.S. PlayStation Magazine | 2.5/5 |
| X-Play | 2/5 |
| The Times | 3/5 |

According to Metacritic, The X-Files: Resist or Serve received "mixed or average reviews". Critics compared the game to the Resident Evil game series for featuring similar gameplay. GameSpot gave the game a score of 7.6 out of 10 and praised the game's story and voice acting, as well as the likeness to the show's actors achieved by the character models used, while criticizing the repetitive combat, obstructive camera angles and frustrating puzzles. The IGN review was similarly mixed, praising the story and writing, while criticizing it for adhering too closely to the Resident Evil formula, including the use of zombies as the primary antagonists, stating "if you're looking for something new or interesting in the survival-horror genre, don't look here."

Joe Juba of Game Informer praised the scenery, music, and voice acting, but criticized the camera angles, and the character animation for being "a bit awkward." Juba noted that the game "does a good job of capturing the mood of the show," but wrote that the "basic formula never changes. You spend so much time wandering aimlessly and kicking prone undead that you never really have a chance to get wrapped up in the exceptionally intriguing and involved story that was clearly intended to make Resist or Serve stand out." Juba stated that elements from the television series were well used, but that they "aren't enough to overcome the uninspired, repetitive puzzle solving required to get the ball rolling."

Andrew Reiner, also of Game Informer, was more positive towards the game, rating it 7 out of 10 and calling it a "surprisingly decent amalgamation of survival horror's heavy hitters – primarily Resident Evil and Silent Hill." Reiner stated, "Sure, it has a fair share of problems – be it the vagueness of puzzles, or the frustrations that the camera brings – but I just couldn't seem to put it down."

Computer and Video Games praised the music, as well as the differences between both playable characters, but noted that the "1990s" gameplay "doesn't really bear up. Yes, it's perfectly competent, but it has all those survival horror control and camera headaches we got sick of ages ago." The magazine also noted the poor graphics and stated that the animated appearances of Mulder and Scully "are a bit dodgy up close."

Steve Steinberg of GameSpy praised the game but felt that it was not perfect. Steinberg enjoyed the ability to play as either Mulder or Scully, as well as the return of the show's actors. However, he noted that "hardcore horror fans might feel a bit underwhelmed by some of the simplistic gaming elements," and criticized the controls, particularly for aiming and shooting. Steinberg also criticized the "dated" graphics, writing, "The character models are accurate, but they're stiffer than the dead bodies that Scully examines at work. It definitely kills some of the nostalgic buzz when a hilarious line is delivered by an emotionless, glassy-eyed Mulder."

Louis Bedigian of GameZone praised the music and called the voice acting "fairly decent," but stated that it "isn't the actors' best work." Bedigian criticized the graphics, writing, "The backgrounds are too grainy to be scary. And most of the characters look like they were made using a DDK (Dreamcast Development Kit) and then ported to PS2." Bedigian also wrote, "The story is supposedly a lost episode, and could have worked really well on the show, or could have been turned into a TV mini-series. But the game is too slow and boring, the graphics are sub-par, and the CG movies aren't effective enough to make the story work in this game."

John Davison of Official U.S. PlayStation Magazine wrote, "There are elements of Resist or Serve that are truly remarkable. Due entirely to the involvement of the writers and cast of the show, it stands apart in a genre not especially known for great scripts or convincing voice acting." However, Davison noted that the gameplay did not "match the class of the story. Just about every survival-horror gameplay faux pas is present, including static camera angles that mess with the controls, the need to run up against every wall to find interactive 'hot spots,' and erratic load times that break up the action when you least expect it. While the character models are reasonably convincing, if a little stiff, the flat environments are almost completely devoid of anything to interact with. It all feels a bit 1998, to be honest." Davison concluded that the game "is not completely dreadful," but that it would disappoint fans of survival-horror games.

Skyler Miller of X-Play praised the voice acting, the story, and the dialogue, but criticized the graphics, awkward camera angles, poor control, and "recycled Resident Evil-style gameplay," including "frustrating" limitations such as "being able to move some objects and not others," as well as "having to search every square inch of a room and kill every creature, just to make sure you didn't miss some obscure object or key that ends up being necessary to move on." Miller wrote that the graphics "are unimpressive, but don't particularly detract from the overall experience. The voice work is so good that it's a little disconcerting to see it synced up with the odd looking character models that make up Scully and Mulder." Miller concluded that "X-Files fans will be more forgiving of Resist or Serve when it comes to the hokey gameplay, but even casual acquaintances of the series will appreciate the effort Black Ops put into the package as a whole. True, this is basically a toned-down Resident Evil with X-Files pasted on top, but Resident Evil hasn't been this interesting for a long time!"
