= International Velvet =

International Velvet may refer to:

- International Velvet (album), an album by Catatonia
- International Velvet (song), title track from the album by Catatonia
- International Velvet (film), a 1978 film starring Tatum O'Neal
- International Velvet (actress) or Susan Bottomly, American model and actress
