= David Duchovny (song) =

Single by Bree Sharp

from the album A Cheap and Evil Girl
- Released: 1999
- Genre: Rock; pop
- Length: 4:08
- Label: Trauma
- Songwriters: Simon Austin; Bree Sharp

Bree Sharp singles chronology
"David Duchovny" (1999)	"America" (1999)

"David Duchovny" is a song recorded by Bree Sharp about the titular actor. It was the first single from Sharp's debut album, A Cheap and Evil Girl. After Trauma Records heard a demo of the song, they signed her to a record deal.

== Lyrics and meaning ==
The song makes a direct reference to actor David Duchovny, who portrayed FBI special agent Fox Mulder on the popular sci-fi TV series The X-Files, which revolves around special agents who work on cases linked to the paranormal, called X-Files. Sharp commented in a 1999 interview with Rolling Stone that the song's message can be interpreted in a more expansive way: "[The] song is about David, but it's also about the way fantasy and reality can blur, and how giddy, hot, and excellent that can be."

== Music video ==
The X-Files set received a demo tape of the song and two of the show's assistants, Charles Forsch and Will Shivers, created a humorous video for the song for the set's Christmas party with permission from Sharp's label. The video mixes clips of Duchovny with footage of X-Files crew members and numerous celebrities lip-syncing the lyrics, including series co-star Gillian Anderson, Brad Pitt, George Clooney, Pamela Anderson, Whoopi Goldberg, Rosie O'Donnell, Jenna Elfman, Sarah Michelle Gellar, Jane Leeves, Alex Trebek, Kiss, and Jerry Springer. A complete list of participants is included in the credits at the end of the video. The video was never officially released, due to the money that would be needed for all the celebrities to sign off, but it became "a hot underground item". Upon seeing the video, Sharp said that "it was so exciting, and so shocking, and underground, and wonderful. I don't know what to say about it except that it was one of the thrills of my life to see the likes of Charles Nelson Reilly, and all four members of KISS, and Brad Pitt."

== Release and acclaim ==
After Sharp recorded the song, it eventually made its way to Duchovny, who expressed his appreciation for the track. Word began to spread, and soon, Sharp was approached by Trauma Records, who signed her for a record deal. After Forsch created the music video for the song, it became an underground hit. In an interview, Duchovny told Entertainment Weekly that he felt that "it's a really good song". He also admitted to playing it in his car "now and then". Ultimately, he jokingly gave it an "85", but noted that it was a "little embarrassing" because he "never expected it to be such a big deal."

Critically, the song received positive reviews. Richard Roeper of the Chicago Sun-Times praised the song and noted that "Sharp has a beautiful and distinctive voice, and 'David Duchovny' is an undeniably catchy confection." Due to the success of the single, Sharp was invited to perform at Lilith Fair for several tour dates.

Reference to this song was made during a March 2011 episode of the Showtime TV series Californication, "The Trial". David Duchovny's character Hank Moody, having uncharacteristically put on a suit and tie, is looking at himself in the mirror and complaining that he "looks like a fucking FBI agent". Natascha McElhone's character Karen then replies, "A very brooding and comely FBI agent."

== Track listing ==
1. "David Duchovny" (Pop Mix) – 4:16
2. "David Duchovny" (Rock Mix) – 4:17

== See also ==
- Music of The X-Files
- The X-Files – American television series
- The X-Files (franchise) – American science fiction–thriller media franchise
