= A Cheap and Evil Girl =

Studio album by Bree Sharp
- Released: July 27, 1999
- Genre: Rock; pop
- Length: 37:33
- Label: Trauma
- Producer: Robbie Adams; Simon Austin; David Bianco; Don DiLego; Roger Greenawalt; Mike Rogers

Bree Sharp chronology
A Cheap and Evil Girl (1999)	More B.S. (2002)

Professional ratings
Review scores
Source	Rating
AllMusic	3/5 stars
Rolling Stone	3/5 stars

A Cheap and Evil Girl is the debut album by singer-songwriter Bree Sharp. It was released by Trauma Records on July 27, 1999. The album peaked at No. 47 on Billboard's Top Heatseekers chart.

== Track listing ==
No.	Title	Writer(s)	Length
1.	"America"	Simon Austin, Don DiLego, Sharp	2:54
2.	"David Duchovny"	Austin, Sharp	4:08
3.	"Walk Away"	Sharp	4:09
4.	"Smitten"	DiLego, Sharp	3:43
5.	"Not Your Girl"	DiLego, Sharp	2:13
6.	"Fallen"	DiLego, Sharp	4:00
7.	"The Cheap and Evil Girl"	Austin, Sharp	3:04
8.	"Faster, Faster"	Sharp	4:02
9.	"Fool's Gold"	Austin, Sharp	2:49
10.	"Guttermouth"	Austin, Sharp	2:34
11.	"Show Me"	Austin, Mike Rogers, Sharp	3:57

== Personnel ==
- Bree Sharp – lead and background vocals, guitar
- Robbie Adams – background vocals
- Simon Austin – guitar, background vocals
- Bret Bass – bass
- Knox Chandler – guitar, bass
- Don DiLego – guitar, bass, piano, percussion, background vocals
- Marko Djordjevic – drums
- Mike Elizondo – bass
- Paul Garisto – drums
- Steve Hamilton – guitar
- Mike Rogers – bass, drums, background vocals
- Winston Roye – bass
- Marty Sarandría – bass
- Kevin Savigar – Hammond organ
- Michael Urbano – drums
