= Tracie Andrews =

British murderer

- Born: Tracie Marguerite Andrews; 9 April 1969 (age 57); England
- Other names: Jenna Stephens Goldsworthy; Tia Carter
- Children: 1

Jenna Stephens (born 9 April 1969), also known as Jenna Stephens Goldsworthy or Tia Carter but better known by her original name of Tracie Marguerite Andrews (originally registered as Tracey Marguerite Andrews), is an English murderer who killed her fiancé, Lee Raymond Dean Harvey (born 20 September 1971), on 1 December 1996. She was sentenced to life imprisonment after being found guilty of murder at her trial in July 1997 and served fourteen years in prison.

== Background ==
Tracie Andrews was the middle child of three siblings and has several half-siblings. Her parents had a volatile relationship and they separated when Andrews was six years old; their separation had a lasting effect on Andrews. In 1990 Andrews gave birth to a baby daughter, but separated from her partner a year later. Andrews had aspirations of becoming a model, but originally began working as a barmaid.

Multiple partners recalled Andrews as being possessive, not liking them having a social life without her presence. Andrews was also prone to explosive displays of anger. In October 1994 she began a relationship with a local man named Lee Harvey, moving in with him three months after they met. Their off-again-on-again relationship was marked by volatility, with both being possessive and jealous of each other's relations with other men and women. The couple frequently argued, which sometimes escalated into violence and led to the police being summoned.

Friends and family members of both Andrews and Harvey were uneasy about their dysfunctional relationship. Harvey had confided in both his friends and his own mother regarding Andrews' emotional problems. Police were called to the house in late October 1996, just over a month before Harvey was murdered. After discovering that Andrews had bitten Harvey on the neck on one occasion, Harvey's mother told him that they should separate for the sake of his daughter. Other family members of Harvey warned him against pursuing a relationship with Andrews, and Andrews' mother also told her daughter not to continue their flawed relationship.

== Murder ==
On Sunday 1 December 1996, after another day of fierce arguments, Andrews and Harvey went to a local pub for the evening in an attempt to reconcile. Andrews claimed that on the way back to their flat in The Becks, Alvechurch, Worcestershire, late that evening the pair became involved in a road rage incident with two men. She claimed a car had followed her and Harvey and that two men from the car had confronted and attacked them after stopping them on a country lane. In reality, Andrews had stabbed Harvey over 42 times with a pen knife after they had stopped in his car following an argument. Harvey's sister later said that as soon as she learned of the murder she knew it was Andrews who had killed him.

At a press conference on 3 December 1996, Andrews elaborated on the supposed attack, saying that a "fat man with staring eyes" had stabbed Harvey after getting out of a Ford Sierra in which he was a passenger. Over the next two weeks, police carried out investigations to track down Harvey's murderer.

The couple's car had stopped near a cottage, and the commotion had alerted a male resident living yards away, who discovered Harvey stabbed on the road and a bruised and bloodied Andrews standing by him. He immediately ran back to his house to call the emergency services. Police noted that Harvey's car had apparently not stopped on the road in any hurry, but had been neatly parked on the side of the road. Harvey had been stabbed in the back, throat and chest 42 times, with a fatal wound through an artery in the neck.

== Police investigation ==
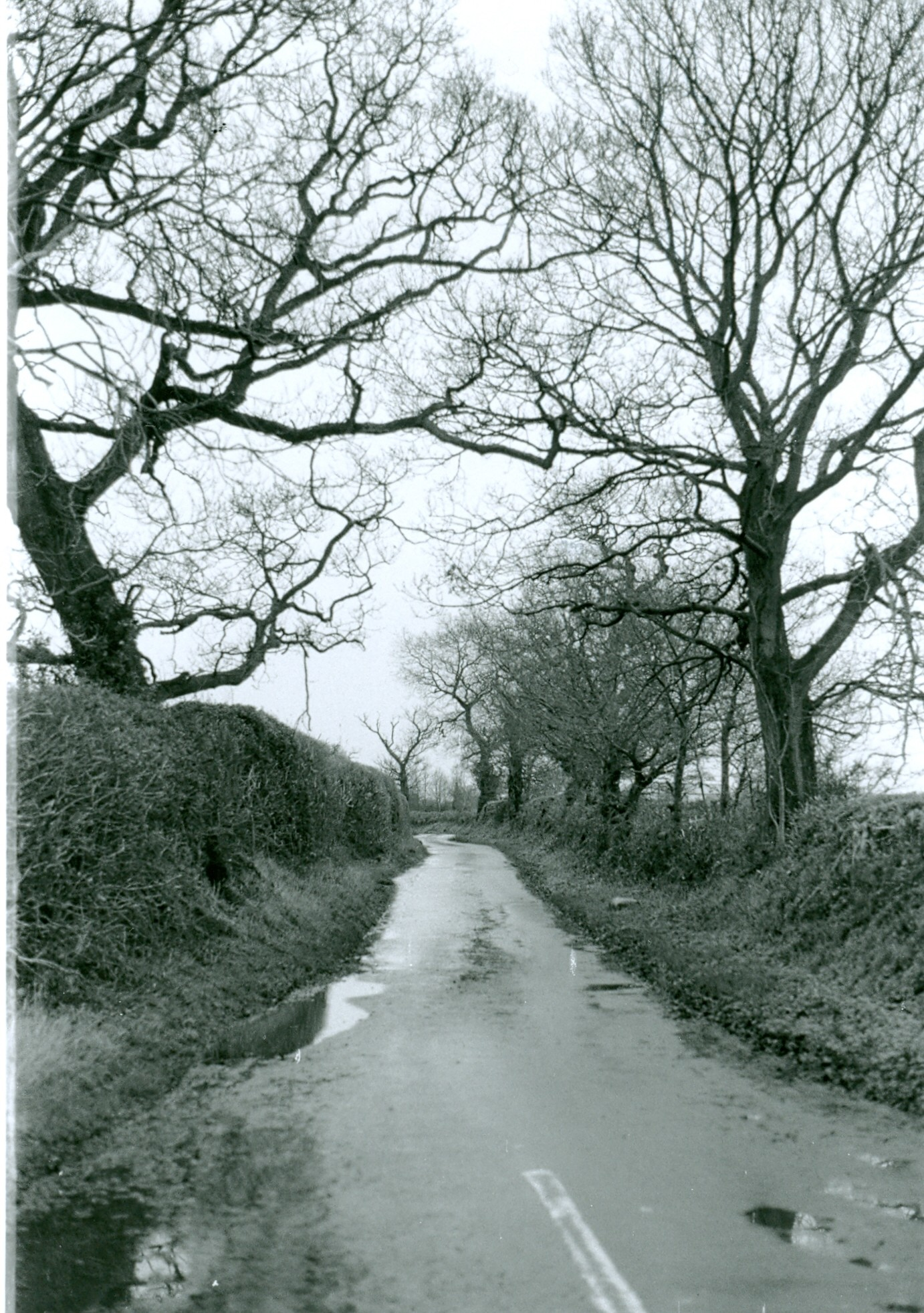
View 200 yards from the site of Harvey's murder by Andrews, pictured in 2009

Although Andrews claimed that she and Harvey had been attacked in a road rage incident, in her press conference of 3 December she said that the driver of the attacker's car was not to blame and appealed for him to come forward, something which the police questioned as the driver had supposedly facilitated the attack on Harvey. Andrews seemed to contradict her original statement, giving different times to her original story, and police had to step in and stop her while she told her story to the press. Police also noted that Andrews had a lot to say for a person who was supposedly in shock.

After the press conference, police began to question Andrews' story. A witness statement from a child in an adjacent cottage said she could clearly hear an argument between a man and a woman after the car had parked up on the night. Police did not find any evidence that a second car had overtaken Harvey's car to stop it before the attack, noting that there were no tyre marks on the grass verges next to the narrow single-lane country road that would be expected if such an event had taken place. In Harvey's hand were found more than 80 strands of Andrews' hair, which pathologists determined would have had to have been taken from her head with considerable force, i.e. through a physical struggle. Most notably, two witnesses came forward after Andrews' press conference to say that they had seen Harvey's white Ford Escort car driving past them on the lane Harvey was murdered on, that night, but that no car was following it and that no other cars had been seen by them on that lane that evening. This disproved Andrews' story that she and Harvey had been attacked in a road rage incident after being followed by a car while driving home.

Having invented her story of how Harvey was murdered, Andrews had then gone on to hold Harvey's mother's hand and the hand of his sister while she recounted the fabricated story in the national press conference of 3 December.

== Attempted suicide and arrest ==
With suspicion mounting on Andrews, she attempted suicide on the day after the press conference by taking an overdose of pills. Andrews' suicide attempt and the confirmation that no road rage incident could have occurred convinced police of the need to arrest her. She was still in hospital two days later when police first arrested her and questioned her about the murder. After being discharged from hospital, she was charged with the murder of Lee Harvey on 19 December 1996 and released on bail.

=== Further evidence ===
Police then discovered a penknife-shaped blood stain and impression in Andrews' boot, convincing police that she had carried the murder weapon in her boot after the murder and had disposed of it at hospital. It was known that there had been a pen knife in Harvey's car on the night of the murder. Andrews had spent long periods of time in the toilet at the hospital for unknown reasons, apparently to dispose of the murder weapon. After examining her heavily blood-stained jumper, the police also determined that the blood had been sprayed onto her after she had stabbed through Harvey's carotid artery, explaining the distinctive blood stain pattern.

== Trial ==
Andrews appeared at Birmingham Crown Court charged with murder on 1 July 1997, and was found guilty on 29 July 1997. The prosecution had been able to skilfully deconstruct her story so as to demonstrate its implausibility. Seven minutes had passed between Harvey being fatally stabbed and him being discovered by the occupant of the adjacent cottage, during which time Andrews had made no attempt to summon help from the houses on the road or from anyone else. Police stated that Andrews had tried to leave the vehicle at the location where Harvey was murdered and that an argument had then occurred. Many of Harvey's stab wounds had been in his back, indicating that Andrews had stabbed him while he retreated to the car. Andrews' mother stated after the trial that she could not understand why her daughter had invented the implausible story she gave.

Andrews was sentenced to life imprisonment, with a recommendation that she serve at least 14 years. Andrews appealed the sentence, claiming that she was the victim of a miscarriage of justice because of damaging publicity surrounding her case. In October 1998, the appeal was denied.

== Confession ==
In April 1999, Andrews admitted that she did stab Harvey to death, and that her entire story had been invented. Changing her story, Andrews then said that she had stabbed Harvey in "self defence." There is no evidence to support this claim, however, particularly as Harvey was stabbed mostly in the back while he apparently retreated to his car.

== Release ==
Andrews was released in July 2011. She was banned from travelling within 25 miles of her victim's family without supervision. After her release, Andrews changed her name to Tia Carter and altered her appearance, undergoing £5,000 surgery through the National Health Service to change the shape of her distinctive jaw, and later changed her name again to Jenna Stephens/Jenna Stephens Goldsworthy. In 2017, she married bouncer Phil Goldsworthy.

When plans to release her were announced, a fellow female inmate and former prison lover of Andrews said that Andrews had continued to act possessively and aggressively in relationships while in prison, revealing that Andrews had attacked and strangled her after seeing her speaking with her ex-girlfriend. The woman said she was opposed to Andrews' release and warned she would kill again.

== Media based on the case ==
The 1998 Catatonia song "Road Rage" was partially inspired by the murder.

In May 2002, the ITV documentary series Real Crime released an episode on the murder titled Tracie Andrews: Blood on Her Hands, featuring interviews with the police investigative team and the mothers of both Andrews and Harvey.

Maureen Harvey, Lee's mother, has written a book, Pure Evil: How Tracie Andrews Murdered My Son, Deceived the Nation and Sentenced Me to a Life of Pain and Misery. It was published in 2007.

The murder was covered in a 2018 episode of the Pick TV/Sky documentary series Britain's Most Evil Killers.

CBS Reality aired a documentary on the killing in 2018, titled Evidence of Evil: The Road Rage Killer.
