= Stephen Schneider (actor) =

American actor, writer and entrepreneur (born 1980)

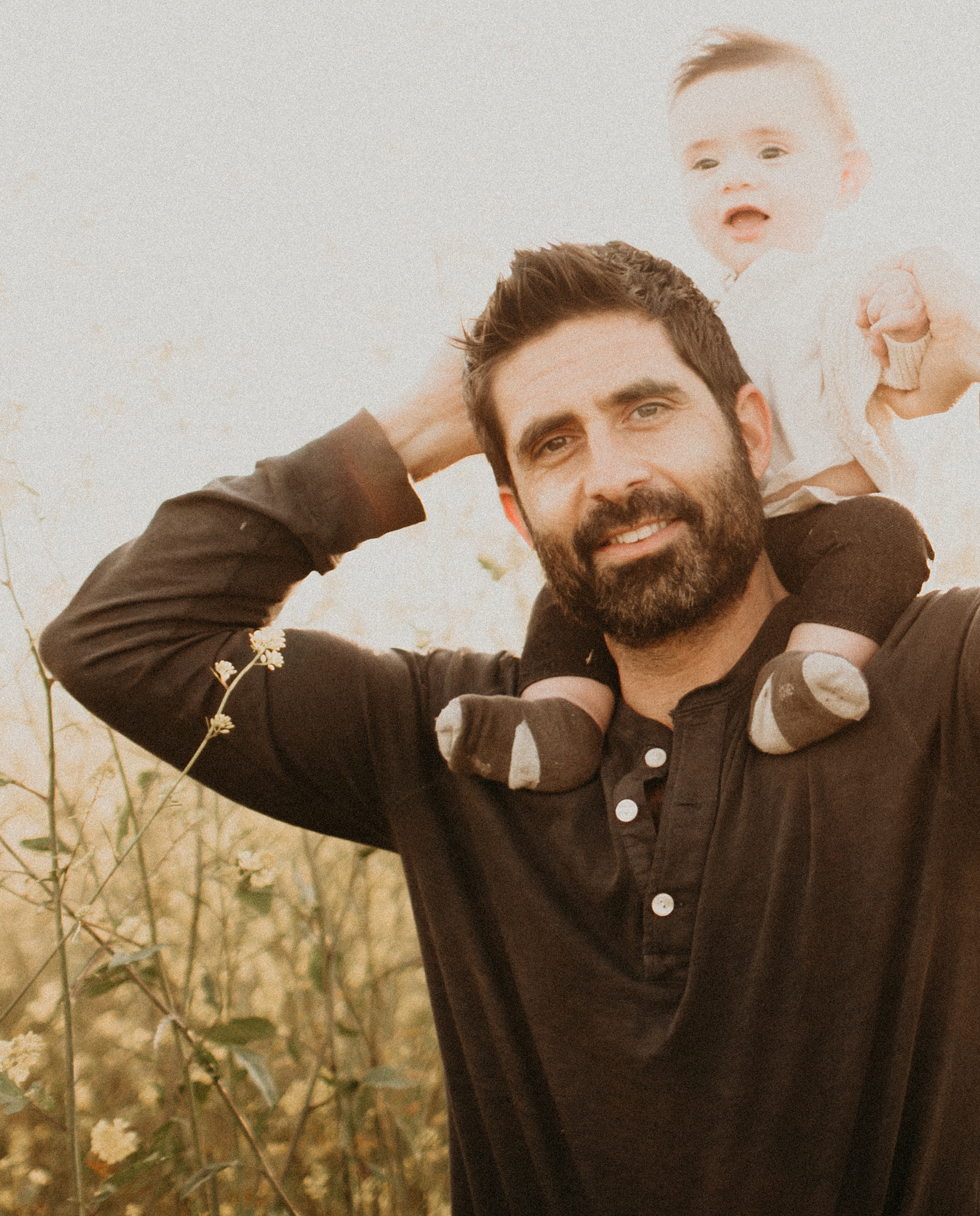
- Born: August 9, 1980 (age 46); Sharon, Massachusetts, US
- Education: Emory University
- Occupations: Actor, writer, entrepreneur
- Years active: 2005–present
- Spouse: Jenn Proske (m. 2013)
- Children: 1
- Website: thebsquad.com

Stephen Schneider (born August 9, 1980) is an American actor, writer and entrepreneur, best known for his roles as Stephen Downes on The Righteous Gemstones, Jeremy Santos on Broad City, Ty Wyland on You're the Worst (both 2014–2017), and Ben Cooper on the ABC sitcom Imaginary Mary (2017).

== Early life ==
Schneider was born in Sharon, Massachusetts, to a Jewish family.

== Career ==
Schneider first gained notice on Comedy Central’s Broad City as Jeremy Santos, Abbi’s across-the-hall neighbor, appearing across multiple seasons including the 2015 episode “Knockoffs.”

He recurred on FXX’s You’re the Worst as filmmaker Ty Wyland between 2014 and 2017. In 2017, he co-starred opposite Jenna Elfman in ABC’s live-action/CGI sitcom Imaginary Mary, playing Ben.

In 2023, Schneider appeared in season three of HBO’s The Righteous Gemstones as Stephen; he discussed filming a widely covered nude fight sequence in a contemporaneous interview.

In 2024, he joined NBC’s workplace comedy St. Denis Medical in a recurring role as hospital chaplain Steve.

=== Other ventures ===
==== Gizmogul ====
Schneider is cited as a founder of the smartphone buy-back company Gizmogul.

==== Cash for Gold USA and CJ Environmental ====
Schneider has served as a spokesman for CashforGoldUSA.com. He is listed as chief financial officer of CJ Environmental, the parent company of CashforGoldUSA.com, in Massachusetts corporate filings. CJ Environmental has appeared on the Inc. 5000 list of fastest-growing private companies.

== Personal life ==
In 2013, Schneider married actress Jenn Proske (who converted to Judaism upon marrying him). On March 28, 2015, Proske gave birth to their daughter, Ava Morata Schneider.

== Filmography ==
=== Film ===
Year	Title	Role	Notes
2007	Puberty: The Movie	Janitor	Also writer and director
2009	2012: Supernova	Captain James Moto	Direct-to-video
2010	The Etiquette Ninjas		Direct-to-video
2011	The Funniest Movie Ever... Just Kidding	Steve Deeds	Also writer
2012	Relativity	Jerry	
2013	Bert and Arnie's Guide to Friendship	Arnie	
2018	Bumblebee	Ron	
2020	Breaking Them Up	Phil	
2026	Love Language	Driving Instructor	
TBA	Love Love †	TBA	Filming

=== Television ===
Year	Title	Role	Notes
2011	Happy Endings	Keith	Episode: "Lying Around"
2011	LoveFinder	Steve	Television movie
2012	Best Friends Forever	Rav Stark	6 episodes
2012	Mental Cases	"Doctor" Schneider	Television short movie
2013	Save Me	Pete Dennings	7 episodes
2014	Things You Shouldn't Say Past Midnight	Ben	5 episodes
2014	Mental Cases	Dr. Cheng	5 episodes
2014–2017	You're the Worst	Ty Wyland	6 episodes
2014–2017	Broad City	Jeremy Santos	13 episodes
2015	Chasing Life	Aaron Phillips	5 episodes
2015	Gigi Does It	Travis	Episode: "Whine"
2015	Sharing	Todd	Television movie
2017	Imaginary Mary	Ben	9 episodes
2018	All About the Washingtons	Curtis Keller	Episode: "U Can't Crash This"
2019	Soundtrack	Jake	2 episodes
2019–2020	Lucifer	Anders Brody	2 episodes
2022	Rutherford Falls	Remington	Episode: "Adirondack S3"
2022	Best Foot Forward	Gary	10 episodes
2022	Players	Nathan Resnick	8 episodes
2023	The Righteous Gemstones	Stephen	4 episodes
2024	St. Denis Medical	Chaplain Steve	Recurring
2024	Nobody Wants This	John	Episode: "The Ick"
2025	Government Cheese	Ronald	Episode: "Two Doors"
