= Bert and Arnie's Guide to Friendship =

- Film poster
- Directed by: Jeff Kaplan
- Written by: Jeff Kaplan; Ian Springer
- Produced by: Waj Arshad; Sal Irizarry
- Starring: Matt Oberg; Stephen Schneider; Anna Chlumsky
- Cinematography: Matthew Santo
- Edited by: Duncan Skiles
- Music by: Peter Fish
- Production company: Justified Ends Entertainment
- Distributed by: FilmBuff
- Release date: June 21, 2013 (New York City)
- Running time: 87 minutes
- Country: United States
- Language: English

Bert and Arnie's Guide to Friendship is a 2013 American comedy film directed by Jeff Kaplan and starring Matt Oberg, Stephen Schneider and Anna Chlumsky. It is Kaplan's directorial debut.

== Cast ==
- Matt Oberg as Bert
- Stephen Schneider as Arnie
- Anna Chlumsky as Sabrina
- Adrian Martinez as Ernesto
- Cristin Milioti as Faye
- Debargo Sanyal as Wesley
- Bree Sharp as Erica
- Emily Ackerman as Jane

== Reception ==
The film has a 33% rating on Rotten Tomatoes.
