= Mulder and Scully (song) =

1998 single by Catatonia

Single by Catatonia

from the album International Velvet
- B-side: "No Stone Unturned"; "Mantra for the Lost"
- Released: 19 January 1998
- Genre: Britpop
- Length: 4:11
- Label: Blanco y Negro
- Songwriters: Cerys Matthews; Mark Roberts
- Producers: TommyD, Catatonia

Catatonia singles chronology
"I Am the Mob" (1997)	"Mulder and Scully" (1998)	"Road Rage" (1998)

"Mulder and Scully" is a song by Welsh alternative rock band Catatonia, released as a single by Blanco y Negro Records from the band's second album, International Velvet (1998). The song makes direct reference to fictional FBI special agents Fox Mulder (David Duchovny) and Dana Scully (Gillian Anderson), the two main characters of the popular American sci-fi TV series The X-Files who work on cases linked to the paranormal, called X-Files. In an interview Cerys Matthews, co-writer of the song, explained that while she was not a serious fan of the show, the basic premise of the series matched the concept of what she was trying to express.

"Mulder and Scully" was released as the second single from International Velvet on 19 January 1998. Originally, it was supposed to be the first single but was delayed due to circumstances beyond the band's control. The song was Catatonia's first single in the United States. "Mulder and Scully" became the group's break-out hit and received a mixed to positive response from the music press; many critics felt that, musically, the song was well played, but that the track's pop culture references were out of place.

The song reached number three on the UK Singles Chart, making it Catatonia's highest-charting UK song. It also became a hit in Iceland, reaching number two, and in Ireland, where it peaked at number 17. A music video was released that featured the band performing the track while Mulder and Scully, played by look-alikes, search the concert venue with torches.

== Lyrics and composition ==
The song makes direct reference to FBI special agents Fox Mulder (David Duchovny) and Dana Scully (Gillian Anderson), the two main characters of the popular sci-fi TV series The X-Files who work on cases linked to the paranormal, called X-Files. Although the title and refrain reference the popular show, the song has little to do with the two characters. Instead, the reference to Mulder and Scully is a metaphor for a relationship being so "strange" that it could be "a case for Mulder and Scully", a reference to the paranormal cases—the titular X-Files—the two investigate on the show. Cerys Matthews, the co-writer of the song, explained that the conceit of the song was "about asking Mulder and Scully to figure out this thing called love. I like the idea of two people going round the planet investigating odd phenomena, in this case love".

Matthews later admitted that she was not a serious fan of the show, but that she only used the line because it adequately described the type of relationship she was singing about. In an interview with the Daily Record, she explained, "I'm not a big fan of [The X-Files] but I got the line about things getting strange for Mulder and Scully from watching the odd episode". After questioning, she later said that she would "prefer to go out for a night on the town with Gazza and Chris Evans than meet [The X-Files] stars Gillian Anderson and David Duchovny". Matthews also related that "I'm sure loads of people bought the record by mistake, but who cares? They should be flattered we wrote a song about [The X-Files] anyway".

During an interview on BBC Radio Wales in November 2025, Duchovny told host Lucy Owen that, while he was aware of the song's existence, he had never actually heard it. Owen then played a snippet of the song for Duchovny, who said he found the song "catchy" but would rather hear it in person rather than over a phoneline.

== Release and acclaim ==
Professional ratings
Review scores
Source	Rating
Allmusic	2.5/5 stars
Melody Maker	"Single of the Week"

The song was met with mixed to positive reviews from critics; many reviewers lauded the band's musical composition, but maligned the track for its heavy reliance on pop culture references. The Sunday Mirror wrote positively of the song and called it "hard rockin'". Ben Myers from the now-defunct music magazine Melody Maker named the song the "Single of the Week" and called it "fantastic". He noted that "they've damn near written a perfect pop song. The first best single of the year". Music Week gave the song five out of five, remarking that "the Welsh indie-popsters take their inspiration from The X-Files rather than The Mob this time around and are certain to hit the charts with this clever grower of a track. Spooky but spiky." Jerry Rubino, host of the WLIR radio show "Left of Center", named the song one of his "Favourite Brit Things". Sarah Zupko from PopMatters noted that the song was built around "somewhat silly X-Files references", but that it possessed "hooks to die for". Stephen Thomas Erlewine from AllMusic gave the song a relatively positive review and singled it out as an "AllMusic Pick". He also praised the song's "terrific [hook]" but was slightly critical of the "self-conscious pop culture references". Despite this, he noted the band was successfully able to "bring memorable melodies to the [song]". A subsequent review by AllMusic awarded the single, by itself, two-and-a-half stars out of five. NME called the song "little more than fodder for nostalgia TV", written by a "lazy television researcher's imagination".

Cerys Matthews and the band were extremely pleased with the final product, calling it a "better song" than "All Around the World" by Oasis, the single's main competitor at the time. Matthews later said that the lyrics for "Mulder and Scully" were "good, top to bottom". Catatonia later released the song as part of their 2002 greatest hits album, And the song was later included on various Britpop compilations, including the Common People: The Britpop Story album, and the 100 Hits of the 90s album, released by the BBC.

== Chart performance ==
Originally, Catatonia wished to release "Mulder and Scully" during mid-1997. However, due to complications, these plans were scrapped and the song "I Am the Mob" was released instead. "Mulder and Scully" was eventually released on 19 January 1998, and, due to heavy promotion via BBC Radio 1, soon became the band's break-out hit, propelling them "into the limelight [...] numerous interviews and television appearances". The band's record label, Blanco y Negro Records, promoted the single with a press release that described the song as "[s]pooky but spiky" and a "clever grower of a track". The song debuted on the United Kingdom chart on 31 January 1998 and made its last appearance on 4 April 1998. During its first week of release, the single performed exceptionally well. Music stores reported that the physical release of "Mulder and Scully" was selling slightly fewer copies than Usher's single "You Make Me Wanna...". Cerys Matthews later told Melody Maker that the single out-sold Oasis "for two days". During its first week, "Mulder and Scully" peaked on the chart at number three and spent a total of 10 weeks on the chart. The song also charted on the Irish Singles Chart, entering the charts on 2 May 1998. It peaked at number 17 and spent five weeks charting. On 15 September 1998, a Japanese EP was released under the name Mulder and Scully EP. It combined tracks from the title single, as well as the "I Am the Mob" and "Road Rage" singles.

== Music video ==
The music video for "Mulder and Scully" was directed by Gerald McMorrow and features the band performing at a venue intercut with scenes of life on a tour bus at night. All the while, Mulder and Scully—played by look-alikes—investigate the area around the concert with torches. Eventually, the agents begin passionately kissing while Catatonia plays their song on a stage. The video was filmed at T.J.'s, a rock concert venue in Newport, Wales. A call was made for fans of the band to arrive and play the part of the audience. Rhys Ifans, one year before his breakout performance in Notting Hill, features prominently. The entire video shoot took a full day to film. The video for "Mulder and Scully" was popular; according to Billboard magazine, it received "heavy rotation" and was played "30 to 35" times weekly in the United Kingdom. The video was heavily promoted in the United States, due in part to its direct allusion to The X-Files, and it received decent airplay.

== Track listings ==
- UK CD single
1. "Mulder and Scully" – 4:10
2. "No Stone Unturned" – 3:28
3. "Mantra for the Lost" – 2:47
4. "Mulder and Scully" (The Ex-Files) – 4:53
- UK 7-inch and cassette single
1. "Mulder and Scully" – 4:10
2. "No Stone Unturned" – 3:28
- Japanese EP
1. "Mulder and Scully" (album version) – 4:10
2. "Road Rage" (radio edit) – 5:10
3. "Jump or Be Sane" – 4:00
4. "No Stone Unturned" – 3:28
5. "Mantra for the Lost" – 2:47
6. "I'm Cured" – 2:55
7. "Blow the Millennium Pt.2" – 2:30
8. "I Am the Mob" (Luca Brasi mix) – 3:41
9. "Mulder and Scully" (The Ex-Files mix) – 4:53
10. "Road Rage (Ghia)" – 5:10

== Personnel ==
- Cerys Matthews – vocals
- Mark Roberts – guitar
- Paul Jones – bass
- Owen Powell – guitar
- Aled Richards – drums

== Charts ==
=== Weekly charts ===
Weekly chart performance for "Mulder and Scully"
Chart (1998)	Peak position
Europe (Eurochart Hot 100)	19
Iceland (Íslenski Listinn Topp 40)	2
Ireland (IRMA)	17
Scottish Singles Sales (Official Charts)	5
UK Singles (Official Charts)	3

=== Year-end charts ===
Year-end chart performance for "Mulder and Scully"
Chart (1998)	Position
Iceland (Íslenski Listinn Topp 40)	28
UK Singles (OCC)	93

== Certifications ==
Certifications and sales for "Mulder and Scully"
Region	Certification	Certified units/sales
United Kingdom (BPI)	Gold	400,000^{‡}
^{^} Shipments figures based on certification alone.

== See also ==
- The X-Files franchise
- Music of The X-Files
