= Imaginary Mary =

American fantasy comedy television series

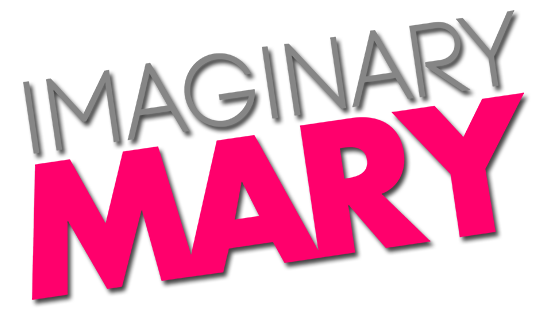
- Genre: Fantasy; Sitcom
- Created by: Adam F. Goldberg; David Guarascio; Patrick Osborne
- Starring: Jenna Elfman; Stephen Schneider; Nicholas Coombe; Matreya Scarrwener; Erica Tremblay
- Voices of: Rachel Dratch
- Composer: Michael Wandmacher
- Country of origin: United States
- Original language: English
- No. of seasons: 1
- No. of episodes: 9

Production
- Executive producers: Adam F. Goldberg; David Guarascio; Doug Robinson; Patrick Osborne; Shawn Levy
- Camera setup: Single-camera
- Running time: 22 minutes
- Production companies: David Guarascio Productions; Adam F. Goldberg Productions; Happy Madison Productions; ABC Studios; 21 Laps Entertainment; Sony Pictures Television

Original release
- Network: ABC
- Release: March 29 – May 30, 2017

Imaginary Mary is an American live-action/animated fantasy sitcom television series created by Adam F. Goldberg, David Guarascio and Patrick Osborne that aired on ABC from March 29 to May 30, 2017. The series is executive produced by the creators and was greenlighted to series order on May 12, 2016. A first-look-trailer was released on the same day. ABC reduced the number of episodes from thirteen to nine on September 28, 2016.

On May 11, 2017, the series was cancelled after one season.

== Plot ==
The series follows Alice when an imaginary friend being from her childhood, named Mary, reappears when she is now a single public relations executive falling in love with a single father of three children. Mary hopes to guide (or misguide) her.

== Cast ==
- Jenna Elfman as Alice
- Stephen Schneider as Ben Cooper, Alice’s love interest
- Nicholas Coombe as Andy Cooper, Ben's son
- Matreya Scarrwener as Dora Cooper, Ben's daughter
- Erica Tremblay as Bunny Cooper, Ben's daughter
- Rachel Dratch as the voice of Mary

== Production ==
The series was first announced in 2015 as Imaginary Friend which was then changed to Imaginary Gary. In the original pilot, the main characters were both men and the love interest was a single mom. When the series went into development, the genders of the characters were flipped. Elfman filmed her scenes first with a puppet in order for the animators to have a reference point, and then in a later take without anything to show what she was talking to. Dratch did her voice work separately in New York with the scenes already filmed. She said at the TCA press tour, "I have the freedom to go crazy."

In September 2016, it was reported that the show's crew would make changes with the animation for the character, Mary, after it received a poor reception from ABC. ABC then reduced the original thirteen-episode order for the first season to nine episodes in order to allow the show's crew to make changes with the animation.

== Episodes ==
No.	Title	Directed by	Written by	Original release date	Prod. code	US viewers (millions)
1	"Pilot"	Shawn Levy	Story by : Adam F. Goldberg & David Guarascio & Patrick Osborne; Teleplay by : Adam F. Goldberg & David Guarascio	March 29, 2017	100	5.39
Alice falls in love with a divorced dad but she then learns that he has 3 kids. Alice becomes consumed by her fears and contemplates giving up until her old childhood imaginary friend, Mary, comes back.
2	"The Mom Seal"	Shawn Levy	Sarah Haskins & Emily Halpern	April 4, 2017	101	3.45
Alice is tasked in taking care of Bunny. A task she takes too far. Ben pressures Andy to take his driving test.
3	"The Parent-y Trap"	Peter Lauer	Margee Magee	April 11, 2017	104	3.06
Alice learns the emotional highs and lows of being a parent when Andy considers auditioning for the school musical; Dora creates her own feminist musical.
4	"Prom-Com"	Richie Keen	Adam F. Goldberg & David Guarascio & Chris Bishop	April 18, 2017	108	3.15
Andy has a hard time finding a prom date while Dora keeps turning away a guy who persistently asks her, but Alice tries to convince her to go. Meanwhile, Ben struggles to deal with kids growing up and tries to scare away Dora's date.
5	"In a World Where Worlds Collide"	Paul Murphy	Brian Gallivan	April 25, 2017	103	2.88
After a hesitant Alice meets Ben's friends, Alice wants to meet Ben's friends, but Ben is hesitant. Later: he makes a startling admission after devising a plan to impress her.
6	"Alice the Mole"	Lev L. Spiro	David Guarascio	May 2, 2017	102	2.63
Alice faces the dilemma of whether she should play the role of parent or friend as she tries to connect with Dora; Ben wants Alice to be his personal mole; Bunny infiltrates the one place Andy feels cool.
7	"The Ex X Factor"	David Katzenberg	Daniel Libman & Matthew Libman	May 9, 2017	105	2.83
When Ben's ex-wife says she doesn't believe Alice is a good influence on the kids, Alice goes out of her way to prove her wrong; Andy and Dora fake being sick at school.
8	"Last Dance with Mary"	Fred Goss	Melody Derloshon & Danielle Uhlarik	May 16, 2017	107	2.80
When Ben and Alice get engaged, Mary disappears, as Alice apparently no longer needs her. However, when Ben begins discussing the realities of marriage, such as living together and possibly having more children, Mary reappears to help Alice cope.
9	"Sleep Over"	Luke Greenfield	Adam F. Goldberg & Chris Bishop	May 30, 2017	106	2.13
Alice is ready to sleep over at Ben's when his kids are in the house, but Ben worries the nightly rituals will put her off; when Alice gets rattled, she gets Mary's help in an attempt to fix the situation.

== Reception ==
=== Critical response ===
The series received a generally negative response from critics. On review aggregator site Metacritic, Imaginary Mary has a score of 39 out of 100 based on 13 critics indicating "generally unfavorable reviews". On Rotten Tomatoes, the show has a 27% approval rating, based on 22 reviews, with an average rating of 3.9/10. The site's critical consensus: "Imaginary Mary's appealing cast is canceled out by uninspired material and a ridiculous premise whose deficiencies are compounded by an unfunny, ill-advised CGI creature."

=== Ratings ===
Viewership and ratings per episode of Imaginary Mary
No.	Title	Air date	Rating/share (18–49)	Viewers (millions)
1	"Pilot"	March 29, 2017	1.4/5	5.39
2	"The Mom Seal"	April 4, 2017	0.9/3	3.45
3	"The Parent-y Trap"	April 11, 2017	0.8/3	3.06
4	"Prom-Com"	April 18, 2017	0.9/3	3.15
5	"In a World Where Worlds Collide"	April 25, 2017	0.8/3	2.88
6	"Alice the Mole"	May 2, 2017	0.7/3	2.63
7	"The Ex X Factor"	May 9, 2017	0.9/3	2.83
8	"Last Dance with Mary"	May 16, 2017	0.8/3	2.80
9	"Sleep Over"	May 30, 2017	0.5/2	2.13

== See also ==
- Drop Dead Fred, a 1991 British/American dark fantasy black-comedy film with a similar concept.
- Son of Zorn, another live-action/animated hybrid that premiered in the 2016–2017 season.
