= More B.S. =

Studio album by Bree Sharp
- Released: August 13, 2002
- Recorded: The Lincoln Lounge, Brooklyn, New York City
- Genre: Rock; pop
- Length: 37:45
- Label: Ahimsa Records
- Producer: Don DiLego

Bree Sharp chronology
A Cheap and Evil Girl (1999)	More B.S. (2002)	Live at Fez (2004)

Professional ratings
Review scores
Source	Rating
Allmusic	3/5 stars
Rolling Stone	(positive) 7/22/02

More B.S. is the second album by singer-songwriter Bree Sharp. It was released by Sharp's own label, Ahimsa Records, on August 13, 2002.

== Track listing ==
All lyrics by Sharp (except "The Boys of Summer").

No.	Title	Writer(s)	Length
1.	"Lazy Afternoon"	Simon Austin, Don DiLego, Sharp	4:11
2.	"Everything Feels Wrong"	DiLego, Sharp	4:01
3.	"Galaxy Song"	DiLego, Sharp	4:12
4.	"The Last of Me"	Austin, DiLego, Sharp	4:04
5.	"The Boys of Summer""	Mike Campbell, Don Henley	4:32
6.	"Sunday School and Cigarettes (Slippin' Away)"	DiLego, David Rolfe, Sharp	3:40
7.	"The Ballad of Grim and Lily"	David Baerwald, David Ricketts, Sharp	4:12
8.	"Dirty Magazine"	Sharp	2:15
9.	"Morning in a Bar"	Austin, Sharp	2:19
10.	"Sleep Forever"	DiLego, Sharp	4:16

== Japan bonus tracks ==
1. David Duchovny (live acoustic version) = 4:25
2. Show Me (alternate version) = 4:11
3. I Will Wait (demo version) = 3:42

== Personnel ==
- Bree Sharp – vocals
- Don DiLego – guitars, bass (except on "The Ballad of Grim and Lily"), percussion, loops, harmonies, organ, Moog synthesizer, Farfisa, Mellotron, Wurlitzer
- Jeremy Adelman – trumpet on "Sleep Forever"
- Simon Austin – acoustic guitar on "Morning in a Bar"
- Paul Garisto – drums (except on "Galaxy Song" and "The Ballad of Grim and Lily")
- Amanda Kapousouz – violins on "The Last of Me" and "The Boys of Summer"
- Erik Olsen – bass on "The Ballad of Grim and Lily"
- Gregg Williams – drums on "Galaxy Song" and "The Ballad of Grim and Lily"
