= Karen Davis (The Grudge) =

- The Grudge character
- Sarah Michelle Gellar as Karen Davis
- First appearance: The Grudge
- Last appearance: The Grudge 2
- Created by: Stephen Susco
- Portrayed by: Sarah Michelle Gellar

In-universe information
- Occupation: Caretaker
- Family: Aubrey Davis (sister; deceased); Mrs. Davis (mother; deceased); Mr. Davis (father; deceased)
- Significant others: Doug (boyfriend; deceased)
- Religion: Catholic
- Status: Deceased
- Cause of death: Falling off of building (Murdered by Kayako Saeki; The Grudge 2)

Karen Davis is a fictional character from The Grudge franchise. Being the central character of the American franchise, she uncovers the Saeki house's dark past and is the only one to survive the first film. She returns in The Grudge 2 and compels her sister, Aubrey, to put a stop to the curse after her death. Her portrayal was met with acclaim by critics and the films crew. She makes a cameo appearance in The Grudge 3 with a flashback scene.

Karen is the American counterpart for Rika Nishina, the main character of Ju-On: The Grudge (2002) though their fates differ between films, as Rika's death scene in the original film was instead given to Karen's sister Aubrey in The Grudge 2. Karen is the archenemy of Kayako Saeki in the American franchise.

== Character arc ==
=== The Grudge ===
Karen Davis (Sarah Michelle Gellar) is the main protagonist of The Grudge. She is an American social worker who moves with her boyfriend, Doug, to Tokyo. She volunteers to take care of a woman named Emma Williams when Emma's first caretaker, Yoko, does not show up to work. When Kayako Saeki, an undead woman bound to a curse, starts killing people around her, she starts investigating the curse's origin. She decides to head back to the house to keep Doug from falling to the curse, but fails. Karen then tries to stop the curse by burning down the house, but this instead releases the curse.

=== The Grudge 1.5 ===
In the animated short film The Grudge 1.5, Karen is rescued by a young Chinese journalist, Eason, when he arrives to the house on fire to find Detective Nakagawa, saving her before they were attacked by Kayako. The two make it out alive and Karen is taken to the hospital.

=== The Grudge 2 ===
The second installment reveals that Karen was hospitalized after the events of the first film. She is now paranoid, traumatized, and frantic to stop Kayako. She is visited by her sister Aubrey, who was sent by their mother. Later, Kayako resurfaces and grabs her arm; panicked, she frees herself and evades Kayako and the police. When she reaches the roof of the hospital, she backs away to the edge of the roof and Kayako pulls her off to her death. In a deleted scenes, Karen's belongings along with Aubrey's were given to their mother. However, it contained Kayako's journal which causes her jaw to be ripped off.

== Reception ==
Gellar received praise for her performance in the first film, and Roger Ebert referenced her performance as the reason for the film's success.

== Casting ==
Before Gellar was cast, numerous other actresses were suggested, such as Selma Blair; the two of them had previously starred together in the teen movie Cruel Intentions. The role eventually went to Gellar, who was known for her work in horror films such as I Know What You Did Last Summer and Scream 2.

== See also ==
- Kayako Saeki
- Aubrey Davis
