= International Velvet (album) =

Studio album by Catatonia
- Released: 2 February 1998
- Recorded: 1997–1998
- Genre: Alternative rock
- Length: 44:56
- Label: Blanco y Negro
- Producers: TommyD, Catatonia

Catatonia chronology
Way Beyond Blue (1996)	International Velvet (1998)	Equally Cursed and Blessed (1999)

Singles from International Velvet
- 1. "I Am the Mob" Released: 6 October 1997; 2. "Mulder and Scully" Released: 19 January 1998; 3. "Road Rage" Released: 20 April 1998; 4. "Strange Glue" Released: 20 July 1998; 5. "Game On" Released: 26 October 1998

International Velvet is the second album by Welsh band Catatonia. It was the band's breakthrough, reaching number one on the UK Albums Chart and spawning two top 10 singles, "Mulder and Scully" and "Road Rage", and three other top 40 singles, "I Am the Mob", "Game On" and "Strange Glue", as well as catapulting the band and lead singer Cerys Matthews into the spotlight. Album sales reached 900,000, as it became one of the biggest selling albums of 1998 in the United Kingdom. The album was also nominated for the Mercury Music Prize.

== Background ==
Catatonia were originally formed in 1992, with guitarist Mark Roberts and singer Cerys Matthews being part of the band that released the critically acclaimed EP For Tinkerbell in 1993. Drummer Aled Richards and guitarist Owen Powell joined prior to the release of their first album Way Beyond Blue and the line-up remained the same for International Velvet. Warner Bros. Records had intended to release "Lost Cat" from Way Beyond Blue in the United States in 1996, but due to problems at the record label the band had never released anything in the US until International Velvet.

== Release ==
International Velvet was released in the United Kingdom on 2 February 1998, following the earlier releases of both "I Am the Mob" the previous October and "Mulder and Scully" a few days earlier. It was awarded 3× Platinum status by the British Phonographic Industry on 12 November 1999, meaning that in 22 months it had sold over 900,000 copies. The album was Catatonia's first release in the United States by the Vapor label owned by Neil Young, but it did not chart and according to The Washington Post was "overlooked". It was Catatonia's first album release in the United States. The success of the album was seen as launching the band into the public spotlight.

Five singles were released from the album. "I Am the Mob" was released on 6 October 1997 and became their second single to reach the top 40 in the United Kingdom, having reached number 40 on the UK Singles Chart. "Mulder and Scully", released on 19 January 1998, became their breakout hit, reaching number three on the chart, and subsequent single "Road Rage" reached number five following its release on 20 April 1998. The final two singles did not reach the top ten, with "Strange Glue" (20 July 1998) getting to number 11 and "Game On" (26 October 1998) only reaching number 33. As part of the opening ceremony for the 1999 Rugby World Cup at the Millennium Stadium in Cardiff, Wales, Catatonia performed the bilingual title track from the album. That track had become an unofficial Welsh anthem due in part to the chorus "Every day when I wake up I thank the Lord I'm Welsh". To promote the album, the band undertook its biggest tour to date.

== Reception ==
Professional ratings
Review scores
Source	Rating
AllMusic	3/5 stars
The Guardian	3/5 stars
The Independent	3/5 stars
Music Week	5/5 stars
NME	6/10
Pitchfork	7.8/10
Q	4/5 stars
Select	4/5
Uncut	3/5 stars
Wall of Sound	77/100

NME critic Johnny Cigarettes said that International Velvet showed Catatonia "to be more versatile than you ever thought possible for such a white-bread guitar group", observing a newfound "rough edge" to Matthews's voice that "lends guts" to "out-and-out pop songs" such as "I Am the Mob" and "Road Rage". However, he felt that when Catatonia performed more typical "guitar pop" they lacked excitement. The Washington Post thought that International Velvet was not as consistent as its predecessor but included it in a list of the best albums of 1998. The Independent's Angela Lewis felt the album fulfilled the promise the band had shown for years.

=== Legacy ===
In a retrospective review for AllMusic, Stephen Thomas Erlewine found that International Velvet "fails as often as it succeeds" in changing Catatonia's sound from "late-'80s indie pop" to something more akin to hard rock, and cited the "self-conscious" pop culture references in "I Am the Mob" and "Mulder and Scully" as examples of a "weakness for gimmicks". He nonetheless concluded that it "has its fair share of pop delights – it just doesn't deliver as many as Way Beyond Blue".

The album was nominated for the 1998 Mercury Music Prize, which was awarded to Gomez for Bring It On. DJ Steve Lamacq hosted a special on International Velvet on his BBC Radio 6 Music series Classic Albums of the 90s in 2010. The album's title track has since achieved an iconic status within the culture of Wales, being performed at the Millennium Stadium in Cardiff for the opening ceremony of the 1999 Rugby World Cup, and representing an important part of the Cool Cymru movement.

== Track listing ==
No.	Title	Writer(s)	Length
1.	"Mulder and Scully"	Cerys Matthews, Mark Roberts	4:11
2.	"Game On"	Cerys Matthews, Mark Roberts	2:51
3.	"I Am the Mob"	Mark Roberts, Catatonia	3:09
4.	"Road Rage"	Cerys Matthews, Mark Roberts	5:09
5.	"Johnny Come Lately"	Cerys Matthews, Catatonia	4:36
6.	"Goldfish and Paracetamol"	Cerys Matthews, Paul Jones	3:50
7.	"International Velvet"	Mark Roberts, Catatonia	4:23
8.	"Why I Can't Stand One Night Stands"	Mark Roberts, Catatonia	2:40
9.	"Part of the Furniture"	Cerys Matthews, Mark Roberts	4:08
10.	"Don't Need the Sunshine"	Owen Powell, Catatonia	3:49
11.	"Strange Glue"	Owen Powell, Catatonia	3:44
12.	"My Selfish Gene"	Mark Roberts, Catatonia	2:27
Total length:			44:56

2015 reissue bonus disc
No.	Title	Length
1.	"I Am the Mob" (Luca Brasi mix)	3:36
2.	"Jump or Be Sane"	3:58
3.	"No Stone Unturned"	3:28
4.	"Mantra for the Lost"	2:47
5.	"Mulder and Scully" (The Ex-Files)	4:57
6.	"Road Rage" (radio edit)	4:00
7.	"I'm Cured"	2:51
8.	"Blow the Millennium (part 2)"	2:28
9.	"Road Rage" (Ghia)	4:55
10.	"That's All Folks"	6:05
11.	"Road Rage" (live)	5:08
12.	"Strange Glue" (live acoustic version)	3:20
13.	"Mulder and Scully" (live in Newport)	3:34

== Personnel ==
Catatonia

- Cerys Matthews – vocals
- Mark Roberts – guitar
- Owen Powell – guitar
- Paul Jones – bass
- Aled Richards – drums

Production

- TommyD – producer, mixing
- Joe Gibb – engineer, mixing
- Jason Harris – assistant engineer
- Paul Read – engineering on "Game On"
- Greg Haver – engineering on "Johnny Come Lately"
- Roland Herrington – mixing on "Mulder and Scully", "Game On", "Road Rage" and "Strange Glue"
- Dave Bascombe – mixing on "I Am the Mob"
- Joseph Cultice – photography
- Nigel Schermuly – photography

== Charts and certifications ==
=== Weekly charts ===
Chart (1998)	Peak position
Australian Albums (ARIA)	27
New Zealand Albums (RMNZ)	32
Scottish Albums (Official Charts)	2
UK Albums (Official Charts)	1

=== Year-end charts ===
Chart (1998)	Position
UK Albums (OCC)	20
Chart (1999)	Position
UK Albums (OCC)	53

== Certifications ==
Region	Certification	Certified units/sales
United Kingdom (BPI)	3× Platinum	900,000^{^}
Summaries
Europe (IFPI)	Platinum	1,000,000^{*}
^{*} Sales figures based on certification alone.^{^} Shipments figures based on certification alone.

=== Singles ===
Year	Song	Peak positions		
Year	Song	AUS	IRE	UK
1997	"I Am the Mob"	—	—	40
1998	"Mulder and Scully"	—	17	3
1998	"Road Rage"	40	29	5
1998	"Strange Glue"	—	—	11
1998	"Game On"	—	—	33

- An en-dash (–) denotes countries in which the singles were not released or did not chart.
