= Road Rage (song) =

1998 single by Catatonia

- UK single release

Single by Catatonia

from the album International Velvet
- B-side: "I'm Cured"; "Blow the Millennium"
- Released: 20 April 1998
- Genre: Britpop
- Length: 5:09 (album version); 4:02 (single edit)
- Label: Blanco y Negro
- Songwriter: Mark Roberts
- Producer: Catatonia

Catatonia singles chronology
"Mulder and Scully" (1998)	"Road Rage" (1998)	"Strange Glue" (1998)

Official music video
- "Road Rage" on YouTube

"Road Rage" is a song recorded by Welsh band Catatonia, taken from their second studio album, International Velvet (1998). It was written by band member Mark Roberts, with the production credit given generally to the band. "Road Rage" was released as the third single from the album on 20 April 1998 by Blanco y Negro, following their breakthrough success with the song "Mulder and Scully". The title "Road Rage" was based on the murder of Lee Harvey by his girlfriend Tracie Andrews in December 1996, something for which singer Cerys Matthews later apologised to Harvey's mother.

"Road Rage" was received positively by the press, with particular praise given to the way that Matthews rolled the R's in the chorus of the song. Commercially, the song peaked at number five on the UK Singles Chart, eventually gaining a silver sales certification from the British Phonographic Industry. It also reached the top 30 in Ireland and the top 40 in Australia. It received nominations for best song at the Brit Awards, and the Ivor Novello Awards, winning at the Q Awards.

== Recording and release ==
"Road Rage" was released as a follow-up to the success of their single "Mulder and Scully", which became their break-out hit. "Road Rage" was released as the third single from the album International Velvet on 20 April 1998. In the United States, "Road Rage" was serviced to alternative radio on 22 February 2000 and was also included on the American release of the album Equally Cursed and Blessed the following month. It later appeared on the best of collection by their label Blanco y Negro Records, Catatonia Greatest Hits.

== Composition ==
The title of "Road Rage" was based on the murder of Lee Harvey by his girlfriend Tracie Andrews in December 1996. She stabbed him more than 30 times with a penknife, claiming originally that this had been committed by a stranger in a road rage-type attack. As a result of the song's release, Lee's mother Maureen said that "It is disgusting that people are trying to make money from such a tragedy. My son did not die in a road rage attack, he was killed by Tracie Andrews. We simply do not need songs like this". Catatonia's lead singer Cerys Matthews said that while the title of the song was based on the case, the lyrics were about advances in technology. In her book Pure Evil, Maureen Harvey stated " . . . at least the group's singer Cerys Matthews had the decency to return my call and explain that she hadn't intended to cause any offence. She tried to convince me that the song showed how Tracie had gone crazy and that it didn't actually do her any favours."

The song structure is based on 4/4 time, with a moderate tempo played at approximately 92 beats per minute. The song contains a total of eight distinct key changes throughout its duration.

== Critical reception ==
Ian Hyland gave "Road Rage" a rating of nine out of ten in his review for the Sunday Mirror. He said that if "Matthews sounded any more Welsh she'd be a dragon but this is a very excellent tune in any language." Richard Wallace called the single "magnificent" in an article for the Daily Mirror and praised the "seductive rolling Rs in the chorus". A reviewer from Music Week asked, "Is there no stopping the new Queen of Pop Cerys Matthews?", and concluded that "this slightly mellower tune is a rough gem of a record that should find plenty of radio support." Paul Cole, for the Sunday Mercury, described "Road Rage" in 2002 as the best of Catatonia's greatest hits and "the perfect pop song".

In 2002, "Road Rage" was ranked as the third best song by a Welsh artist, behind "Delilah" by Tom Jones and "Sixty Eight Guns" by The Alarm, in a list compiled for the Guinness World Records British Hit Singles book. However, none of these songs featured in the overall top 20.

"Road Rage" was nominated for several major music awards. It won the Best Single award at the Q Awards in 1998, with Matthews picking up the award on the night. It was nominated for Best British Single at the 1999 Brit Awards, but lost out to "Angels" by Robbie Williams. "Road Rage" was also nominated for Best Contemporary Song at the 1999 Ivor Novello Awards. After the award was given to Tin Tin Out instead, Matthews left the ceremony but later returned.

== Live performances ==
Catatonia played at the Barrowland Ballroom in Glasgow, Scotland, shortly after the release of "Road Rage" as the support act for Travis. Neil Cooper at The Scotsman said that "the way [Matthews] rolls her R's" on "Road Rage", "you can forgive her anything." A similar comment was received in the Birmingham Evening Mail for the performed at the Wellington Rooms, Liverpool, saying "the way she rasped and rolled her R's on Road Rage was delightful".

Returning to the Barrowland Ballroom in March 1999, the audience joined in with the rendition of "Road Rage", causing the review in the Daily Record to describe the atmosphere as not "all that different to some huge, back-of-the-bus knees-up". After the breakup of Catatonia, Matthews performed "Road Rage" solo at the Inspirations for Barretstown Camp concert on 30 March 2012.

== Track listings ==
- UK and Australian CD single; German maxi-CD single
1. "Road Rage" (radio edit) – 4:00
2. "I'm Cured" – 2:51
3. "Blow the Millennium" – 2:28
4. "Road Rage (Ghia)" – 4:55
- UK 7-inch and cassette single
1. "Road Rage" (radio edit) – 4:00
2. "I'm Cured" – 2:51

== Charts ==
=== Weekly charts ===
Chart (1998)	Peak position
Australia (ARIA)	40
Europe (Eurochart Hot 100)	45
Iceland (Íslenski Listinn Topp 40)	27
Ireland (IRMA)	29
Scottish Singles Sales (Official Charts)	6
UK Airplay (Media Control UK)	10
UK Singles (Official Charts)	5

=== Year-end charts ===
Chart (1998)	Position
UK Singles (OCC)	123

== Certifications ==
Region	Certification	Certified units/sales
United Kingdom (BPI)	Gold	400,000^{‡}
^{‡} Sales+streaming figures based on certification alone.
