= Bree Sharp =

American singer-songwriter

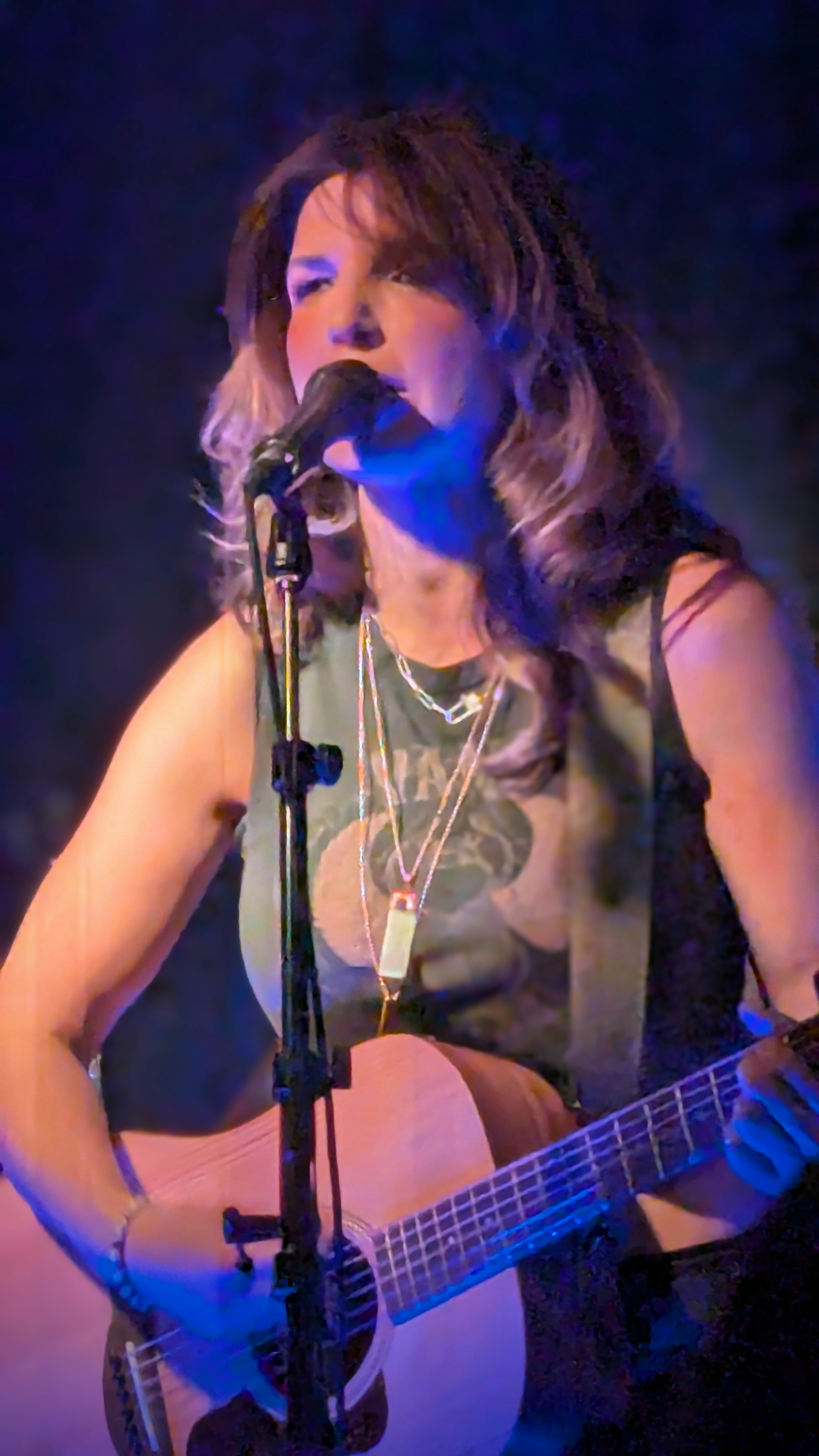

Background information
- Born: December 17, 1975 (age 50); Philadelphia, Pennsylvania, U.S.
- Genres: Rock, pop, folk
- Occupations: Singer-songwriter, guitarist, actress
- Instruments: Vocals, guitar
- Years active: 1999–present
- Labels: Trauma Records; Ahimsa Records; Velvet Elk Records
- Member of: Beautiful Small Machines
- Website: breesharp.com beautifulsmallmachines.com

Bree Sharp (born December 17, 1975) is an American musician and actress. As of the 2010s, she is the lead vocalist of the electropop band Beautiful Small Machines.

A native of Philadelphia, Sharp studied theatre at New York University before releasing her first album A Cheap and Evil Girl in 1999, which contained the cult single "David Duchovny." Her second album, More B.S. was released in 2002. Beginning in 2005, Sharp began recording music for anime and cartoons dubbed by 4Kids Entertainment. In 2009, she founded Beautiful Small Machines with long time collaborator Don DiLego. Beautiful Small Machines released the EP Robots in Love in 2009 and the album The DJ Stayed Home in 2014.

== Early life and education ==
Sharp was born in Philadelphia, Pennsylvania, and learned to play guitar by 15. By 17, she had moved to New York City to study theater at New York University. While in college, Sharp began writing the songs that led to her 1998 record deal with Trauma Records.

== Career ==
In July 1999, she released her first album, A Cheap and Evil Girl. The album's first single, "David Duchovny," garnered a cult following both for its musical qualities and its comical references to the titular actor. Will Shivers and Charles Forsch, production assistants and producers on The X-Files, produced a video for "David Duchovny" featuring myriad celebrities crooning the lyrics including Brad Pitt, George Clooney, Whoopi Goldberg, Alex Trebek, David Spade, all four members of Kiss, Gillian Anderson, David Duchovny himself and dozens of others. The video was a hit on the Internet and circulated widely in the underground fan community. The song lyrics were quoted in David Duchovny's later Showtime Network TV series, Californication, in 2011.

In the summer of 1999, Sharp played as part of the Lilith Fair, the all-women music festival created by Sarah McLachlan and headlined by McLachlan and Sheryl Crow. In 2000, Sharp toured with Bush and Moby as part of MTV's “Campus Invasion Tour” in colleges across the United States.

Sharp's second single "America," is an examination of contemporary American culture.

In 2001, Sharp left Trauma Records, which at least one music journalist attributed to the company's poor management.

In August 2002, she released her second album, More B.S., on her own label, Ahimsa Records. In September 2004, Sharp released Live at Fez, a recording of a May 2003 unplugged performance in New York City, which included the new song, “Waving Goodbye."

In 2005, Sharp began working as a teleplay writer on Japanese anime import Ojamajo Doremi, dubbed in English as Magical DoReMi that aired as part of Fox's Saturday morning cartoon block. She also contributed the song "This Side of Paradise" to the dubbed English version of the Pokémon movie Pokémon: Destiny Deoxys and "Team Up!" as the opening theme music for the dubbed English television version of Tokyo Mew Mew, also known as Mew Mew Power. Sharp also sang most of the songs for Mew Mew Power and contributed the song "Where the Girls Are" in the 4Kids Entertainment edit of Winx Club.

In July 2007, Sharp starred as Leila in Vassar College's Powerhouse Summer Theater workshop production of Pete Townshend's The Boy Who Heard Music.

On August 2, 2007, Sharp announced on her MySpace blog that the mixing of her long-delayed third studio album, Robots in Love, was all but complete, and posted four of the new songs ("EastSide," "So Long 2 U," "In the Name of Revenge," and "Robots in Love") on her MySpace music player. In January 2008, she added two more new songs ("Counting Back to 1" and "The Wretched Sound of City Cars") to the player. Sharp ultimately opted to release the new material not as a solo album but under the name Beautiful Small Machines, a band comprising herself and longtime collaborator Don DiLego.

Following the Robots in Love EP, she released the single "Simple Joys (4 Roy & Pris)," which featured vocals from Simon Le Bon, the longtime frontman for Duran Duran. The two became friends when she opened for them at a radio show in St Louis, MO in 2003. The song is an homage to the ill-fated androids from the movie Blade Runner. In 2012 Beautiful Small Machines released their version and music video for the song Paper Planes, a twangy cover of the M.I.A. song. Their next album entitled The DJ Stayed Home was released in 2014.

Sharp made her film debut in the role of Erica in the independent movie Bert and Arnie's Guide to Friendship, directed by Jeff Kaplan, which also starred Anna Chlumsky, Cristin Milioti and Adrian Martinez.

From 2012- 2014 Sharp was a member of the Upright Citizen's Brigade sketch comedy house teams “Dinner” and “Ripley” and performed weekly the Upright Citizens Brigade Theatre in New York City. In 2014, she guest starred on an episode of Louie. The episode also starred Jerry Seinfeld, Victor Garber and Yvonne Strahovski.

In 2018, along with partners Don DiLego, Jesse Malin and Tom Baker, Sharp helped to open the east village bar and music venue, Coney Island Baby on Avenue A (formerly Hi-Fi). Sharp, DiLego and Malin all began their music careers in the east village and were looking to provide a space for live music in their old stomping grounds where music venues had dwindled. A year later the bar changed names to Lola before closing due to Covid in May 2020. During its 2-year run, the 200 person capacity club held intimate shows with rock legends Jack White (White Stripes), Billie Joe Armstrong (Green Day), Run (Run DMC), H.R. (Bad Brains) and hundreds of local and touring acts. Sharp held her own concert there in the fall of 2019 to celebrate the 20th anniversary of her debut album, “A Cheap and Evil Girl”.

From 2012 to present, Sharp has had a successful commercial voice over career, lending her voice to such brands as Revlon, Geico, Holiday Inn, Walmart, TJMaxx, Coffee Mate, Fisher Price, and has been the brand voice for E*trade since 2020, including two Super Bowl commercials in 2021 and 2022. She has upcoming scripted drama podcasts for Audible, Wondery and Apple Music set to be released in the fall of 2022.

Her single, "Simple Joys (4 Roy & Pris)" feat. Simon Le Bon was re-released on Spotify on October 11, 2022, in honor of Duran Duran’s upcoming induction into the Rock and Roll Hall of Fame.

== Personal life ==
Sharp is a vegan and animal rights activist.

== Discography ==
=== Solo ===
Album	Record label	Release year
A Cheap and Evil Girl	Trauma Records	1999
More B.S.	Ahimsa Records	2002
Live at Fez	Ahimsa	2004

=== With Beautiful Small Machines ===
Album	Record label	Release year
Robots in Love EP	Velvet Elk Records	2009
The DJ Stayed Home	Velvet Elk Records	2014

== Filmography ==
=== Film ===
Year	Title	Role	Notes
2008	Revengers Inc.	Dakota West	
2009	Off the Ledge	Janice	
2013	Bert and Arnie's Guide to Friendship	Erica	
2015	One More Time	Singer #2	
2017	Staring at the Sun	Mrs. Segal	

=== Television ===
Year	Title	Role	Notes
2014	Louie	Jamie	Episode: "Model"
