= I Am the Mob =

1997 single by Catatonia

Single by Catatonia

from the album International Velvet
- B-side: "My Selfish Gene"
- Released: 6 October 1997
- Length: 3:09
- Label: Blanco y Negro
- Songwriter(s): Catatonia, Mark Roberts
- Producer(s): Catatonia, TommyD

Catatonia singles chronology
| "You've Got a Lot to Answer For" (1996) | "I Am the Mob" (1997) | "Mulder and Scully" (1998) |

"I Am the Mob" is a song by Welsh rock band Catatonia from their album International Velvet. It became the band's second top 40 hit, peaking at No.40. The song's lyrics refer to the gangster movie The Godfather, with lines "I put horses' heads in people's beds, cause I am the Mob", and "That Luca Brasi: ah, he sleeps with the fishes".

The song received very little airplay, due to the lyrics being considered unfriendly for radio stations.

The recording begins with a short sample "from a discussion on bullying lifted from Jenny Jones – an American talk show."

The B-side "My Selfish Gene" later appeared on the International Velvet album.

== Music video ==
The accompanying music video was directed by Kevin Allen in the highlands of Scotland, showing the band playing with toy boats and fishing. According to Catatonia's guitarist Owen Powell, the video took two days to shoot. He stated that the band did not want the song to look like a pop video, "We wanted it to be slightly different." Catatonia drummer Aled Richards can be seen playing a drum kit model that The Who's Keith Moon used to own, with goldfish inside. Owen Powell claimed that "[Moon] used to put goldfish in it. That's what Aled wanted – a sort of homage to Keith Moon."

== Formats and track listings ==
- UK CD single
1. "I Am the Mob"
2. "Jump or Be Sane"
3. "Selfish Gene"
4. "I Am the Mob" (Luca Brasi Mix)

== Charts ==
| Chart (1997) | Peak position |
|---|---|
| Scotland (OCC) | 39 |
| UK Singles (OCC) | 40 |
