= Music of The X-Files =

Music of The X-Files franchise is composed and written by American Mark Snow; the franchise was created by Chris Carter. Snow has composed the music for all the franchise main releases (etc. television shows and films). Together with the show, the music was positively met by critics and viewers of the show alike. Snow has been nominated with over twenty awards and nominations for his music on the various franchise releases, but notably The X-Files. Among the most famous compositions of the franchise is the theme song for The X-Files. The theme was a top ten hit in the United Kingdom, peaking at number two on the UK Singles Chart.

With The X-Files peaking in popularity in the mid-to-late 1990s, the music did too. When the show was hitting its peak in popularity, Carter created a spin off to the series, entitled Millennium which aired from 1996–1999. While never gaining as much attention as The X-Files, the show's theme song and soundtrack releases were well received by critics. The Lone Gunmen is the last television spin off of The X-Files which only aired for around two months. A soundtrack of the original music has been released in a set with music from Carter's other short lived Science Fiction series Harsh Realm. Snow returned to compose music for the franchise with the film, The X-Files: I Want to Believe.

== The X-Files ==
=== Early conception and series (1993–2002) ===
Mark Snow got involved with The X-Files, since he was a good friend of executive producer R.W. Goodwin. At the start, Carter and the producers wanted Snow to focus on using synthesizers to craft heavily ambient soundscapes. This early emphasis on abstract arrangements bored Snow who instead wanted to take the show in a much more musical direction.

When creating the music for The X-Files film, Snow had a couple of months to write and to produce the music while he also created the music for the television show. The first film marked the first time the music for the franchise was composed and recorded with help from an orchestra. According to Snow, the recording and writing process didn't change during the making of the film. The biggest difference was that he used MIDI files to save his musical scores and pieces, which would go to a copyist who would take it through one of their programs and eventually give it to the orchestrators.

The sixth season episode "The Unnatural" marked the first time in the series that the show recorded the score with musicians rather than synthesizers. Slide guitar player Nick Kirgo and harmonica player Tommy Morgan assisted Snow with the score.

For the seventh season episode "Closure", Mark Snow's music was not used, being replaced by Moby's "My Weakness". Carter never told Snow about this change. While Snow has been confirmed to be more positive to it than negative, saying it fit "perfect", and further stating, "Every once in a while, when Chris would pick out a pop song or whatever, he would always make really great choices and I thought that was a good one."

"Within", the season eight premiere, was the first of six episodes to feature the song "Scully's Theme". The other five were "Without", "Per Manum", "This Is Not Happening", "Deadalive" and the season finale "Existence". The song features a solo female voice that repeats the distorted words "We are near" over and over. According to Carter, it is one of the greatest things that series composer Snow has ever done. Carter himself admitted to "tweaking" the song a little, adding the three words that are repeated over and over, with the idea to "distort" them.

=== I Want to Believe (2008) ===
After The X-Files was cancelled in 2002, Chris Carter and his crew started working with a goal of releasing a second X-Files film. In 2003, Carter called Snow, who by that time lived in London, UK and said he wanted him to return for another film. Snow was positive to the idea, but filming got bogged down by contract issues between Fox and Carter. Once the contract issues were sorted out, Carter re-contacted Snow about the development and later on sent him the script for the film. Carter and his production crew wanted as much secrecy for the film as possible, forcing Snow to sign a contract when receiving the script. Snow wrote a couple of demos at the start, in which Carter and Frank Spotnitz were not too pleased about, but it eventually worked out when Snow re-recorded them.

When composing the music for The X-Files: I Want to Believe, Snow said it was "different" from the previous film which followed the show's mytharc storyline about the government conspiracy with aliens. He said it was much "more heart, warmth and tuneful music" since this film was much more based around Fox Mulder (David Duchovny) and Dana Scully's (Gillian Anderson) relationship.

Snow recorded the score with the Hollywood Studio Symphony in May 2008 at the Newman Scoring Stage at 20th Century Fox in Century City, California. No music was written out during Snow's recording season with the symphony orchestra. When making the music, Snow used many instruments such as a "battery of percussion", taiko drums and whistle with live singers, among other things. It took four days to record and writing music for and with the orchestra. He used no trumpets and no high woodwinds when recording, but used up to eight french horns, five trombones, two piano, one harp, thirty-two violins, sixteen violas twelve cellos and eight basses.

British performers UNKLE recorded a new version of the theme music for the end credits to the movie. Some of the unusual sounds were created by a variation of silly putty and dimes tucked in between and over the strings of the piano. Mark Snow also comments that the fast percussion featured in some tracks was inspired by the track 'Prospectors Quartet' from the There Will Be Blood soundtrack. UNKLE's song "Broken" was also included in the end credits.

== Millennium ==
The theme music for Millennium was created by Mark Snow. A popular belief amongst fans is that the theme song was inspired by Kylie Minogue's dance-pop song "Confide In Me". In reality, Chris Carter allegedly sent him a traditional Scottish céilidh song.

== Reception and legacy ==
"The X-Files" theme music went straight to No. 2 on March 30, 1996, on the UK Singles Chart and stayed there for three weeks before dropping. In France, the single entered the chart at No. 42 on April 6, 1996, climbed quickly until reaching No. 2 four weeks later. It remained blocked for five weeks at this position, behind Robert Miles's hit "Children", then topped the chart for a sole week, becoming the second instrumental number-one hit, before climbing. It totalled 1 weeks in the top ten and 30 weeks in the top 50. The single was re-charted from October 1998, but remained in low positions.
