= Catatonia (band) =

Welsh rock band

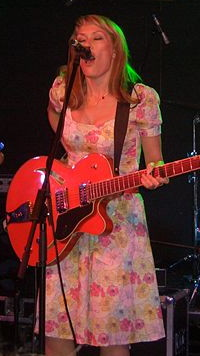
- Lead vocalist Cerys Matthews performing in July 2006.

Background information
- Origin: Cardiff, Wales
- Genres: Alternative rock, post-Britpop, indie pop, indie rock, Britpop (early)
- Years active: 1992–2001
- Label: Blanco y Negro
- Past members: Cerys Matthews; Mark Roberts; Stephen Jenkins; Guto Pryce; Dafydd Ieuan; Paul Jones; Clancy Pegg; Aled Richards; Owen Powell

Catatonia were a Welsh alternative rock band who gained popularity in the mid-to-late 1990s. The band formed in 1992 after Mark Roberts met Cerys Matthews. The first major lineup featured Dafydd Ieuan of Super Furry Animals on drums, Paul Jones on bass, and Clancy Pegg on keyboards. With this line-up the band recorded two EPs, For Tinkerbell and Hooked.

Pegg was fired prior to work on their first studio album, Way Beyond Blue, and during the recording of the album the band was joined by drummer Aled Richards, replacing Ieuan, who left to focus full-time on Super Furry Animals. During the live promotional appearances for the album the band was joined by guitarist Owen Powell. This latest incarnation of the band lasted until its dissolution in 2001. The single "You've Got a Lot to Answer For" received radio airplay and became the band's first top 40 single in the UK Singles Chart in September 1996. Their breakout success came at the start of 1998 with the International Velvet album and the release of the single "Mulder and Scully" some two weeks apart. The album went to number one in the UK Albums Chart, and sold more than 900,000 copies being certified triple platinum by the British Phonographic Industry, while the single reached number 3 in the UK Singles Chart, the highest any Catatonia single would chart.

The follow-up release, "Road Rage", reached number 5 in May, and was nominated for best song at the Brit Awards and the Ivor Novello Awards, winning at the Q Awards. The title track of the album International Velvet received additional attention, and the band performed it at the opening of the opening ceremony of the 1999 Rugby World Cup on 1 October in the Millennium Stadium in Cardiff. While in Catatonia, Matthews collaborated with Space on "The Ballad of Tom Jones" in March 1998 and with Tom Jones on a cover of "Baby, It's Cold Outside" in December 1999. Their final top ten single came in April 1999 with "Dead from the Waist Down" off the following album, Equally Cursed and Blessed. Rumours began to circulate about a breakup, but a further album, Paper Scissors Stone was released in 2001 following a two-year break from live performances.

Matthews' drinking had long been reported in the tabloids and gossip columns, and she entered rehab in mid-2001 for drinking and smoking. The tour to support Paper Scissors Stone was cancelled, and a month later, the band announced that they were breaking up. Matthews has subsequently released solo albums, while Powell has become a radio presenter and joined the supergroup The Stand to release a charity single. Critics have highlighted the use of metaphors in Catatonia's work, as well as comparing songs to poetry. Writing duties had been shared across the band, although had been led by Matthews and Roberts. They disagreed with being labelled an indie band, with Powell saying they had only ever sought to write pop music. The band were considered a key band of 1990s Cool Cymru.

== History ==
=== Formation (1992) ===
The story that Catatonia were formed after Mark Roberts spotted Cerys Matthews busking in Cardiff in 1992 was an invention for the media in order to give the band a newsworthy biography. While the duo did go busking, they did not meet this way. Matthews had been a fan of Roberts' previous band Y Cyrff. They began dating as well as writing songs together at the end of 1991. For five years after this they remained in the relationship, many aspects of this being played out publicly in their lyrics. They took the name of the band from Matthews' experience working in a mental health facility as well as the novel The Doors of Perception by Aldous Huxley. They believed it to mean a sense of extreme pleasure and sleep, and wrote the song "Sweet Catatonia", subsequently naming the band after the song. As Sweet Catatonia, Matthews and Roberts recorded a series of demos at the city centre youth project in Cardiff, nicknamed "Grassroots".

Roberts and Matthews routinely encountered Owen Powell during this time, who played guitar in the band Colour 45 and was working as a Welsh teacher at Brynteg Comprehensive School. Both bands entered a band competition to play at the Cardiff Bay Music Fiesta, and while Colour 45 came tenth and was given a place on the bill, Sweet Catatonia placed 45th. Roberts and Matthews hired a drummer, Stephen "Frog" Jenkins from the band U Thant, and continued to record bilingual Welsh/English tracks. The band began to play live, with Matthews and Roberts busking to support their income. They were spotted by the girlfriend of the lead singer of the band The Pooh Sticks, who thought that Matthews would make a good female voice for the group. But after seeing Sweet Catatonia perform, the band members did not agree and so Matthews remained with Catatonia. Further recordings were made, with Guto Pryce joining the trio. This session included the track "Gyda Gwen" which attracted the attention of Rhys Mwyn at Crai Records.

=== The Crai EPs, "Whale", and "Bleed" (1993–95) ===
The band line up changed as they signed to Crai, with Jenkins and Pryce departing for other projects. Mwyn arranged for Matthews and Roberts to be joined by Dafydd Ieuan of Ffa Coffi Pawb on drums, former Y Cyrff member Paul Jones on bass, and Londoner Clancy Pegg (who had befriended Roberts and Matthews after moving to Cardiff) on keyboards. It was at this point that the band shortened its name to "Catatonia". Mwyn used his contacts to get Catatonia onto Welsh language television, and strove to move their live performances away from Cardiff so that they were not simply playing in front of their regulars the entire time. They had their first overseas gigs in Germany, supporting Mwyn in his punk band Anrhefn. Catatonia were hired by political party Plaid Cymru to headline a Welsh language concert at Builth Wells in August 1993, but they performed in both Welsh and English.

Despite being signed to Crai, this was more as promoter than as a record label itself. It was only when Roberts suggested that Catatonia record some extended plays (EPs) after two months with the label that Mwyn made the arrangements. The first, entitled For Tinkerbell, had a cover photo taken by Roberts and Matthews' housemate Roland Dafis. Mwyn successfully got the record on BBC Radio 1 after sending a copy to radio presenter Mark Radcliffe. After Iestyn George heard the release, the journalist named it as the record of the week for the magazine NME. For Tinkerbell contained some early tracks, including a version of "Sweet Catatonia". Matthews later explained that while she had liked the songs on the EP, she felt that she was not good at performing live at the time. They signed to Nursery Records to release the single "Bleed". Catatonia's first national interview was published following the release of "For Tinkerbell", a 300-word piece appearing in Melody Maker.

They held their first London gigs in support of the EP, under the advice of George and The Pooh Sticks lead singer Hue Williams. After warm-up gigs in Cardiff and Birmingham, the London performance took place at the Samuel Beckett pub in Stoke Newington on 13 November 1993 alongside Anrehfn and Margi Clarke. Further Welsh radio and television appearances followed, as did an interview for NME. When George arrived for the interview, Matthews asked if he'd be interested in becoming the band's manager. He politely declined, saying that he did not have the experience. On 19 and 20 February 1994, the band's follow-up EP, Hooked was recorded in Llandwrog, Gwynedd, and produced by Ken Nelson who they had met on Radio Wales. A performance was set up at The Falcon, Camden the Splash Club in London where several music executives were to be present. The band drove down from Cardiff in a Ford Transit with their equipment and then spent the afternoon drinking. Just prior to going out on stage, they began taking cocaine, the result of which was a terrible performance later lamented by Roberts. The trip became a sobering experience, as they made no money from it and were only paid £50 for a gig at Kingston University a day later. Matthews later recalled that they'd needed to borrow money from a fan to pay the toll on the Severn Bridge on the way back to Cardiff.

The band returned to the Falcon, where they played a still shambolic, but better gig in front of record executives. Meanwhile, George had put the band in touch with their first manager, Richard Lowe from MRM management. They made further appearances on Welsh television to support the release of Hooked in May, but another drunken performance followed, this time in Newport. MRM sent them on a short tour in France during the second week of May, and then started their first UK wide support tour to the band Salad. When due to perform at the Cnapan Music Festival in Wales on 2 July, the band ran into some difficulties. The security team refused to let Matthews in as they did not recognise her. It was only after the intervention of one of the fans of the band, actor Rhys Ifans, that she was allowed in.

Mwyn departed the band when the band's time with Crai came to an end, and a few weeks later MRM sought to remove Pegg, leaving it to Matthews to tell her. Pegg was upset, and refused to discuss it with journalists. After her departure, the single "Whale" was published on the Rough Trade Records label. The band had rushed to record it, having only been given a month's notice by the label that one of their songs would be released as a single in September 1994. "Whale" was named the NME single of the week, as For Tinkerbell had been the previous year. The band appeared in the mainstream press for two incidents, the first was when they were thrown off a train at Swindon as they were travelling to London after arguing with a train guard about punk rock, and the other when they swore at the bouncers in Welsh at the Underworld club in Camden and were banned. A further single, "Bleed" was recorded the following November, and was released in February 1995 on Nursery Records. Geoff Travis, who had released "Whale" for his Rough Trade Records, offered the band £350,000 to sign for Blanco y Negro Records, a subsidiary of Warner Bros. Records. They duly signed.

=== Way Beyond Blue (1996) ===
The band began work on a debut album, alongside producer Paul Sampson. Ieuan introduced Sampson to Aled Richards, who later replaced him as Catatonia's drummer when Ieuan left to join the Super Furry Animals. The label wanted to market the band, and so at some expense, had photographer Gered Mankowitz conduct a photoshoot with Matthews. She, the band and their management all hated the photos, but the label wanted to use them in order not to write the cost off as a loss. In order to have some photos, a series of black and white photos of Matthews drinking a bottle of wine while wearing a Pepsi T-shirt were taken by one of the press agency staff. Warner Bros liked the images and authorised their use. The band had a recording session at Sawmills Studios, Cornwall, which saw some disagreements during recording between Matthews and Roberts. Afterwards, Sampson was removed as producer following a row over the arrangement for "Sweet Catatonia".

Music reviewers responded with surprise when the band began to perform live while sober. Meanwhile, the release of "Sweet Catatonia" as a single was pushed back to January 1996 due to the issues with finding a new producer. The first time subsequent producer Stephen Street met the band was when they arrived to record at the Maison Rouge Studios in London. They found working with him far easier than Sampson, as Matthews later explained that he took their ideas into account. Ieuan left during the recording of the album to join Super Furry Animals, and was subsequently replaced by Aled Richards. They returned to live performances after completing the recording of the album, and decided to actively look for a second guitarist. They ultimately hired Colour 45's Owen Powell, who by this time was working as a music technician for the Super Furry Animals, to this role.

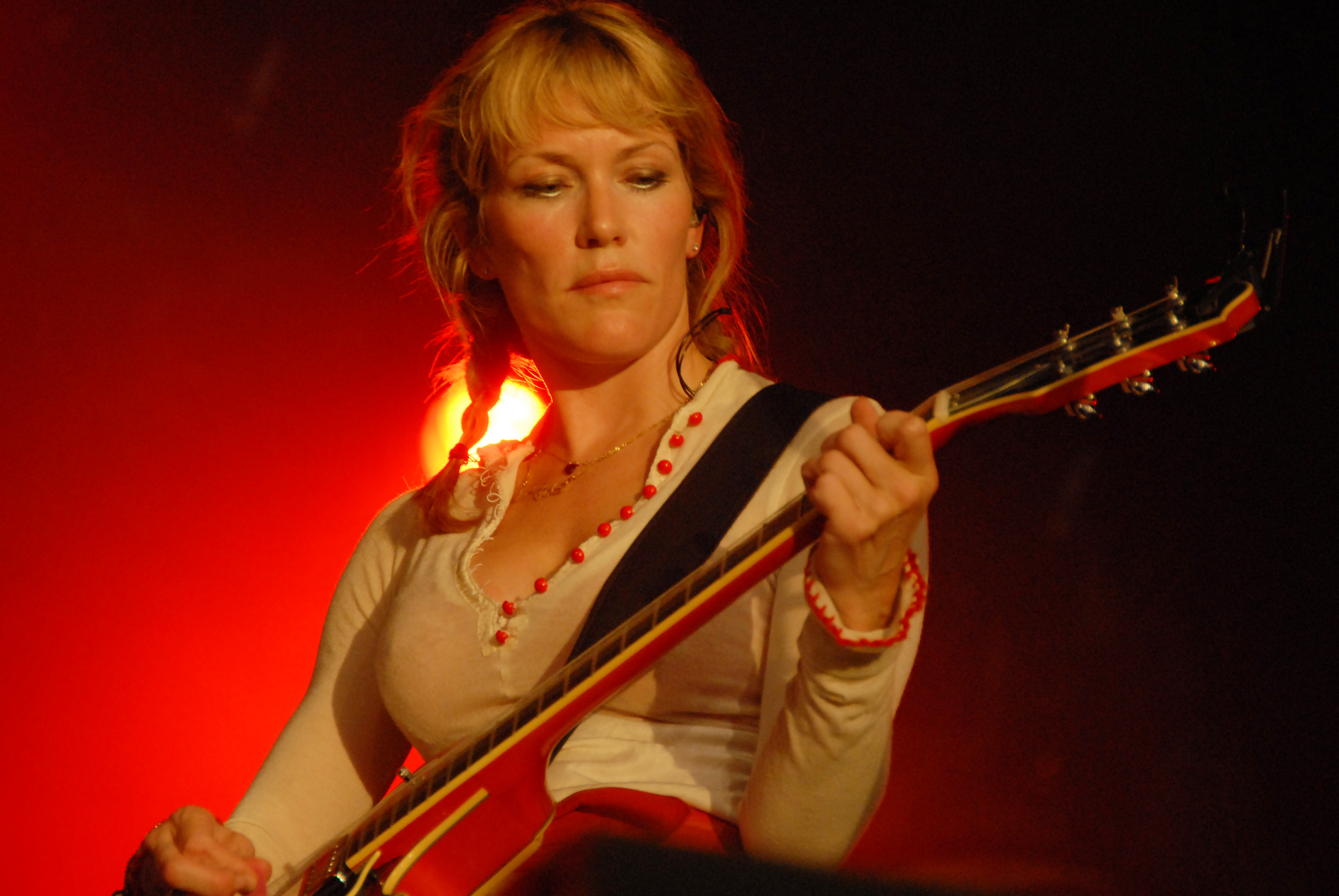
Cerys Matthews (pictured in 2006) and Mark Roberts broke up after the release of Way Beyond Blue

As they prepared for the album, they released a special release for the Catatonia fanclub which had formed after "Bleed". Containing "Blow the Millenium, Blow" and "Beautiful Sailor", the vinyl record was sent to all members. The following month, on 18 January 1996, "Sweet Catatonia" was released. It became the first Catatonia single to reach the UK singles chart, peaking at 61st position. MRM sought to expand the profile of the band in Europe, publishing the compilation The Sublime Magic of Catatonia. The band toured the UK, supported by Liverpool-based band Space, and while touring "Lost Cat" was released on 22 April. It just missed out on the top 40, reaching 41st position. As part of the tour, they appeared at several music festivals that year including Reading, Phoenix and at Madstock! 3 in London.

Catatonia began to get radio exposure with the single "You've Got a Lot to Answer For" which entered the top 40 in September 1996. After several delays, the album Way Beyond Blue was released on 30 September. There were 12 tracks, several of which had appeared on previous EPs and as b-sides to singles. On the background of the successful album, there were problems behind the scenes. Matthew's and Robert's relationship broke down, with Roberts ending it and seeing someone else within days. The duo sought to keep the band together despite the problems, and they found a way to continue working together. Warner Bros. Records had intended to release "Lost Cat" from Way Beyond Blue in the United States, but due to problems at the record label this did not occur.

=== International Velvet (1997–98) ===
While Roberts sought to begin work on a second album, they began to tour with fellow Welsh band The Manic Street Preachers as a support act, and the label released the compilation Tourist EP in Japan. They began recording demos for a new album in Cardiff at the start of January 1997. The subject matter was mostly based on the stories coming out of Roberts and Matthews' breakup. They booked in a recording session for the second album in June, at the Monnow Valley Studio in Rockfield, Monmouthshire. In the run up to the recording, they performed for the first time in the United States, supporting The Boo Radleys in New York. They went on to perform in Austin, Texas and in Los Angeles during March. The following month, they conducted a ten-night tour of the UK, in which songs such as "Mulder and Scully" made their first public appearances.

As they worked on the album, Catatonia feared that they were about to be dropped by their record label, which they summed up in the song "That's All Folks". Further references to difficulties with Warner Bros were included in "I Am the Mob", but they preferred working with producer TommyD on the production than they had with those on Way Beyond Blue. The first single off the album had intended to be "Mulder and Scully", but the label insisted that "I Am the Mob" was released instead. As with previous works, this was delayed, and Catatonia performed at festivals during the summer of 1997 while they waited for the release. They were booked for the Glastonbury Festival, but upon arriving they were told their spot had been cancelled. Matthews continued to get the band mentioned in the gossip columns of newspapers due to her drunken behaviour. One example followed an incident at a party celebrating the victory of the yes vote in the 1997 Welsh devolution referendum, as when asked how she felt about the result, she responded "What we want to know is who is going to shag Siân Lloyd?" Lloyd subsequently launched legal action, but accepted an apology from Matthews.

The new album was further delayed as Warner Bros ordered the removal of the six-minute-long anti-Warner track "That's All Folks". Meanwhile, work continued on "I Am The Mob" with a video shoot directed by Kevin Allen. The single was released on 6 October and entered the top 40 for a single week in the 40th position. Catatonia found their roles reversed shortly afterwards, performing as the support act to Space after the Liverpudlians had a series of top 20 singles. They finished off the year with a tour of their own, originally aimed to support the new album, but this was still being held back by the label. Warners replaced "That's All Folks" with "My Selfish Gene", and agreed to release "Mulder and Scully" in January 1998 and International Velvet some two weeks later.

"Mulder and Scully" launched them into the mainstream public consciousness when it was released on 19 January 1998. It entered the charts at number 3; the highest position a single by Catatonia would ever achieve. International Velvet became the breakout album for the band, charting at number one in the UK Album Charts. The album sold more than 900,000 copies in 22 months, being certified triple platinum by the British Phonographic Industry. International Velvet was nominated for the Mercury Music Prize 1998, which was awarded to Gomez for Bring It On.

Of the five singles released from the album, "Road Rage" became the most critically acclaimed, being nominated for best single at both the Ivor Novello Awards and the Brit Awards, while winning in that category at the Q Awards. Despite this, it did not chart as high as "Mulder and Scully", reaching number 5 on the UK Singles Charts. The subsequent releases "Strange Glue" and "Game On" did not get into the top ten, reaching number 11 and number 33 respectively.

The title track of the album, "International Velvet", featuring the line "Every day when I wake up I thank the Lord I'm Welsh" and Welsh language verses, received additional attention from the media. Matthews explained in an interview that she wanted to turn to invert the idea of being Welsh from an apparent negative into a positive, "We're not seen to be very good at anything. Our football team is shit. The song is saying, despite all these things, I still wake up in the morning and thank the Lord that I'm Welsh. Hopefully, by now people realise that Wales is brimmed full of talent and we're great people with massive brains." In front of 70,000 spectators, Catatonia performed "International Velvet" at the opening ceremony of the 1999 Rugby World Cup in the Millennium Stadium in Cardiff. The album became the first to be released for Catatonia in the United States, but failed to chart. The Washington Post called it "overlooked".

=== Equally Cursed and Blessed (1999–2000) ===
Following the success of International Velvet, and the heavy touring that followed, the band were pleased to return to the Monnow Valley Studio to record a third studio album. On the recommendation of TommyD, the band had been recording sample tracks onto a DPS12 hard disk recorder in their tour bus while on an American tour and they returned to Monnow Valley to record them properly. The band felt less pressure on them for the new album, due to the success of International Velvet and because they no longer feared being dropped by the label.

In January 1999, the band announced their new album, Equally Cursed and Blessed. The title was taken from a line from "She's A Millionaire", a song on the album. Preceded by the first single, "Dead from the Waist Down" on 22 March, Equally Cursed and Blessed was released on 12 April. The album, like International Velvet, reached the top spot in the UK charts. Catatonia were so popular at the time that in April 1999, Way Beyond Blue, International Velvet and Equally Cursed and Blessed were all in the top 40 of the UK Albums Chart. But, the singles from Equally Cursed and Blessed did not repeat the success seen in the previous album. "Dead From The Waist Down" ended up becoming the final single by Catatonia to reach the top ten in the singles charts, getting to number seven in the UK singles charts. "Londinium" reached number 20, while "Karaoke Queen" barely entered the top 40 at number 36.

In May, they played two outdoor concerts at the Llangollen International Pavilion in front of 6,000 people on successive days. This was a warm up to their largest concert so far, held at Margam Country Park near Port Talbot. Guitarist Powell stated the importance of the Llangollen performances, as North Wales was the first place where the crowd had sung along to their songs. Matthews added that Margam Park was chosen as no-one had ever held a concert there before.

Catatonia supported R.E.M. on two European dates in June; there was an incident at Kindl-Bühne Wuhlheide, Berlin, when Matthews ran on the stage during the R.E.M. performance to kiss bassist Mike Mills. It was later attributed to her having drunk a bottle of wine. The band had wanted to release "Karaoke Queen" as the second single off the album, but the record label forced them to release "Londinium" instead. Matthews was also equally angry that the cost for the video for the single was higher than the cost to produce the entire album. A month later, Barry Cawley, who had been a roadie for the band since it originally formed, was killed in a road accident in North Wales. Cawley had been cycling when he was killed by a driver in a Fiat Punto. Roberts explained prior to the funeral that the roadie had helped keep Matthews' "feet on the ground".

The band attempted to break into the United States once more with Equally Cursed and Blessed. The album release included two tracks from International Velvet, including "Road Rage". They had been scheduled to make appearances on American television shows such as The Tonight Show with Jay Leno and conduct interviews with the media. But after drummer Richards was taken to hospital in the UK with appendicitis, it was abandoned and the rest of the band returned to the UK. Richards had remained in the UK and was due to join them a day and a half later. Rumours began to appear in the press that the band was about to break up, but a band spokesman stated that the intention was to return to the States later in the year. Performances did take place in Japan, Australia and New Zealand.

=== Paper Scissors Stone and dissolution (2001) ===
The band took a break from performing live between the NetAid charity concert in October 1999 and 2001. They returned to the stage for a further charity gig on 28 April, in support of Unison's campaign for a living wage at the Manchester Evening News Arena. Matthews said prior to the performance that "It's a cause I think's really important and it just seemed to be the right time for us to come back – it's a long, long time since we played live. It should be really great. We're really looking forward to what they (the new songs) are going to sound like live. It'll be good to get back on the old live circuit again." They played several tracks from their upcoming album, at that point entitled It's What's Not There That Makes What's There What It Is. By May, it had been renamed to Paper Scissors Stone. Matthews was looking forward to the new releasing, explaining to NME that "I think it's stronger than the last album, a bit more avant garde!...It's a bit less stupid. [Equally Cursed and Blessed] was all over the shop stylistically, I think it's a bit more focused. And I think it's a bit more impassioned".

Catatonia went on to headline the NME stage at the T in the Park festival on 7 July, having conducted a warm up concert at The Lighthouse, Glasgow. The lead single from the new album, "Stone by Stone", was poorly received by the media with NME giving it a score of one out of ten, calling it "lumpen, the voice grating" and that Catatonia are "fading from the public consciousness quicker than Shane Ritchie" and "awkwardly out of date". On the other hand, Andy Gill of The Independent felt the song is the "closest they come" to a hook "as memorable as" their erstwhile hits.

The media reported that Matthews entered drug rehabilitation for drinking and smoking in mid-2001, with the singer stating that she was also suffering from depression. As a result, the tour to support Paper Scissors Stone was cancelled at the start of August. At the time this was because Matthews had not yet finished her "ongoing treatment for anxiety and exhaustion". It was suggested that the band might split up in August, which was dismissed as "rubbish" by Catatonia. However, on 21 September it was announced that they were breaking up with the record label releasing a statement which said "Their decision has been made entirely amicably, and there are no details at present as to their future plan".

Tributes came in for the band from a variety of sources, with BBC Radio 1 presenter Huw Stephens describing them as "international superstars", and adding "I always thought they were one of the best Welsh bands. They were not just a throwaway pop band – they had real, meaningful songs." Iestyn George, editor of the magazine Maxim at the time, praised the influence that Matthews had through Catatonia in the later 1990s, saying that "Around 1998 and 1999, Cerys was in the papers every other day". He also referenced that she had never intended this role as Catatonia had thought that they had already peaked prior to International Velvet.

=== Post-dissolution (2002–present) ===
Matthews went on to release her first solo album, Cockahoop, in May 2003. Her second album Never Said Goodbye was released in August 2006. In November 2007 she released a mini-album of Welsh language songs Awyren=Aeroplane on the My Kung Fu label. Matthews returned in late 2009 by releasing albums simultaneously in both Welsh and English (Paid Edrych I Lawr and Don't Look Down, respectively). Her next album Explorer released in 2011 in between the release of two Welsh cover albums TIR in 2010 & Hullabaloo in 2013. Since 2008 she has thrived as a music host for BBC Radio, where she has won awards including the Prix Italia and Prix Europa. Cerys currently has 2 weekly radio shows on BBC, which she programmes and hosts: BBC Radio 2's Blues show and a multi-genre BBC Radio 6 music Sunday show, held from 10 to 1 pm. Powell has gone on to write songs, including for Duffy, and from 2007 onwards has presented a Welsh language show on Radio Cymru. He also replaced drummer Stuart Cable from the Stereophonics, following his death, in the supergroup The Stand. They released a charity single in 2010 to fund construction of a statue of Welsh footballer Fred Keenor in Cardiff city centre.

On 17 April 2020, during the COVID-19 pandemic, Matthews confirmed that Catatonia were aiming to take part in a #timslisteningparty for International Velvet. A date was announced, but postponed due to an unspecified problem with either Matthews' or Roberts's internet connection. The party remained on timstwitterlisteningparty.com as an upcoming event until the autumn of 2020, when all reference to it was removed. Matthews did appear as a guest on Tim Burgess' Listening Party radio show on Absolute Radio in 2023, where the album was played in its entirety, marking its 25th anniversary.

On 3 June 2023, Matthews announced on Twitter that a new retrospective collection of music titled Make Hay Not War: The Blanco Y Negro Years would be released by Cherry Red Records.

== Side projects and collaborations ==
While working on International Velvet, Matthews was approached by Tommy Scott of the Liverpool-based band Space to perform on the single duet "The Ballad of Tom Jones". They had met while on tour two years prior and had kept in touch. She joined them on tour for several dates to sing the duet live. Matthews said of the song, "It's great. I feel like Nancy Sinatra because it's a superb ballad." She went on to duet with Tom Jones on a single for his album Reload. It was a cover of the song "Baby, It's Cold Outside", which was released as a Christmas single in 1999. She was credited as "Cerys from Catatonia".

== Musical style and influences ==
Matthews said that they did not have any particular influences in their music. However, she said that her family had always been singing along to BBC Radio 2. She held the ambition to have the band appear on Radio 2, as due to poor levels of radio reception in Wales they had been unable to listen to other stations. She attributed the style of Welsh music as never attempting to be cool as they would not have been aware of what was in fashion at the time. Catatonia frequently used metaphors in their songwriting, such as "Road Rage" which references emotional anger. The line "If it turns to blue, what are we going to do?" in the single "You've Got A Lot To Answer For" from Way Beyond Blue references a pregnancy test. Other works from International Velvet were compared to poetry by Katharine Viner in The Guardian.

All members of the band were involved in the writing of songs, and there may have been more than one person's set of lyrics appearing in a single release. Powell said that "It's quite interesting to have two people's viewpoints within the same song. I'm not sure how many bands actually do that. In most bands, the guitarist writes the music and the singer writes the lyrics. We tend to share things out more evenly." He also criticised the attachment of an indie pop label to the band, saying "We're seen as one of the indie bands. But we've always just tried to make pop music. Even if it is pop music with a hard edge and quite a twisted little view of life. We've always seen ourselves as a little bigger than an indie band."

The style of music played by Catatonia changed slightly over time. An article in The People newspaper described International Velvet as the "purest pop". By the time that Paper Scissors Stone was released, the band were using country music influences in some of their songs according to Fiona Shepherd at The Scotsman. She compared the music to that of the Scottish band Mogwai, while elements of "Nightfall" were compared to Arab Strap.

== Personnel ==
=== Members ===
Final lineup

- Cerys Matthews – vocals (1992–2001)
- Mark Roberts – guitars (1992–2001)
- Paul Jones – bass (1993–2001)
- Aled Richards – drums (1996–2001)
- Owen Powell – guitars (1996–2001)

Former members

- Stephen Jenkins – drums (1992–1993)
- Guto Pryce – bass (1992–1993)
- Dafydd Ieuan – drums (1993–1996)
- Clancy Pegg – keyboards (1993–1994)

=== Lineups ===
1992	1992	1992–1993	1993–1994
Cerys Matthews – vocals; Mark Roberts – guitars	Cerys Matthews – vocals; Mark Roberts – guitars; Stephen Jenkins – drums	Cerys Matthews – vocals; Mark Roberts – guitars; Stephen Jenkins – drums; Guto Pryce – bass	Cerys Matthews – vocals; Mark Roberts – guitars; Dafydd Ieuan – drums; Paul Jones – bass; Clancy Pegg – keyboards
1994–1996	1996	1996–2001
Cerys Matthews – vocals; Mark Roberts – guitars; Dafydd Ieuan – drums; Paul Jones – bass	Cerys Matthews – vocals; Mark Roberts – guitars; Paul Jones – bass; Aled Richards – drums	Cerys Matthews – vocals; Mark Roberts – guitars; Paul Jones – bass; Aled Richards – drums; Owen Powell – guitars

== Discography ==
=== Studio albums ===
Year	Details	Peak chart position					Certifications (sales thresholds)
Year	Details	UK	AUS	GER	IRL	NZL	Certifications (sales thresholds)
1996	Way Beyond Blue: Released: 30 September 1996; Label: Blanco y Negro	32	—	—	—	—	UK: Gold
1998	International Velvet: Released: 2 February 1998; Label: Blanco y Negro/WEA	1	27	—	39	32	UK: 3× Platinum
1999	Equally Cursed and Blessed: Released: 12 April 1999; Label: Blanco y Negro/Atlantic	1	48	—	—	28	UK: Platinum
2001	Paper Scissors Stone: Released: 6 August 2001; Label: Blanco y Negro	6	—	55	37	—	UK: Silver
"—" denotes releases that did not chart.

=== Compilation albums ===
Year	Details	Peak chart position					Certifications (sales thresholds)
Year	Details	UK	AUS	GER	IRL	NZL	Certifications (sales thresholds)
1995	The Sublime Magic of Catatonia: Released: 1995; Label: Nursery	—	—	—	—	—	
1999	The Crai-EPs 1993/1994: Released: 19 October 1999; Label: Crai/M.I.L. Multimedia	—	—	—	—	—	
2002	Greatest Hits: Released: 15 October 2002; Label: WEA	24	—	—	43	—	UK: Silver
2006	The Platinum Collection: Released: 21 March 2006; Label: WEA	—	—	—	—	—	
2011	Road Rage: The Best of Catatonia: Released: 20 June 2011; Label: Demon Music Group	—	—	—	—	—	
2023	Make Hay Not War: The Blanco Y Negro Years: Released: 25 August 2023; Label: Cherry Red Records	—	—	—	—	—	
"—" denotes releases that did not chart.

=== EPs ===
Year	Details	Peak chart position					Certifications (sales thresholds)
Year	Details	UK	AUS	GER	IRL	NZL	Certifications (sales thresholds)
1993	For Tinkerbell: Released: May 1993; Label: Crai	—	—	—	—	—	
1994	Hooked: Released: June 1994; Label: Crai	—	—	—	—	—	

=== Singles ===
Year		Title	Peak chart positions				Album
Year		Title	UK	AUS	IRL	NZL	Album
1994	Sep	"Whale"	—	—	—	—	Non-album single
1995	Jan	"Bleed"	104	—	—	—	Non-album single
1996	Feb	"Sweet Catatonia"	61	—	—	—	Way Beyond Blue
1996	May	"Lost Cat"	41	—	—	—	Way Beyond Blue
1996	Sep	"You've Got a Lot to Answer For"	35	—	—	—	Way Beyond Blue
1996	Nov	"Bleed" (re-issue)	46	—	—	—	Way Beyond Blue
1997	Oct	"I Am the Mob"	40	—	—	—	International Velvet
1998	Jan	"Mulder and Scully"	3	—	17	—	International Velvet
1998	May	"Road Rage"	5	40	29	—	International Velvet
1998	Aug	"Strange Glue"	11	—	—	—	International Velvet
1998	Nov	"Game On"	33	—	—	—	International Velvet
1999	Mar	"Dead from the Waist Down"	7	56	—	44	Equally Cursed and Blessed
1999	Jul	"Londinium"	20	66	—	—	Equally Cursed and Blessed
1999	Nov	"Karaoke Queen"	36	—	—	—	Equally Cursed and Blessed
2001	Jul	"Stone by Stone"	19	—	—	—	Paper Scissors Stone
"—" denotes releases that did not chart.

=== Promotional releases ===
- Christmas '95 (1995, fan club vinyl record)
- Tourist EP (1996, Japan EP)
- A's & B's of Catatonia (1998, Promo EP)
- Storm the Palace EP (2000, Japan EP)
