= Londinium (song) =

1999 single by Catatonia

Single by Catatonia

from the album Equally Cursed and Blessed
- B-side: "Apathy Revolution", "Intercontinental Sigh"
- Released: 12 July 1999
- Studio: Monnow Valley (Rockfield, Wales)
- Length: 4:36
- Label: Blanco y Negro
- Songwriters: Mark Roberts, Catatonia
- Producers: TommyD, Catatonia

Catatonia singles chronology
"Dead from the Waist Down" (1999)	"Londinium" (1999)	"Karaoke Queen" (1999)

"Londinium" is a song by Welsh band Catatonia from their third studio album, Equally Cursed and Blessed (1999). It was written by Mark Roberts with Catatonia and produced by TommyD and the band. Released on 12 July 1999, the song reached number 20 on the UK Singles Chart.

== Recording and release ==
"Londinium" was released as the second single from the album Equally Cursed and Blessed against the wishes of the band, who wanted to release "Karaoke Queen" instead. Singer Cerys Matthews was also equally annoyed that the studio had spent more on the video than it had cost to produce the album. She was open about it in interviews, saying as much both to NME and when interviewed by Jo Whiley on BBC Radio 1.

The song was released on 12 July 1999 and was supported by a string of appearances on television shows such as CD:UK, The Pepsi Chart Show and Top of the Pops. However, it did not pick up a great deal of airplay amid fears that it contained inflammatory lyrics about London, and the line "sushi bars, wet fish, it just sucks the life out of me" was removed for the radio edit. It peaked in the UK charts at number 20.

== Track listings ==
UK and Australian CD single

1. "Londinium" (album version) – 4:36
2. "Apathy Revolution" – 4:20
3. "Intercontinental Sigh" – 2:56

UK 7-inch and cassette single

1. "Londinium" (album version) – 4:36
2. "Intercontinental Sigh" – 2:56

== Credits and personnel ==
Credits are lifted from the Equally Cursed and Blessed album booklet.

Studios

- Recorded at Monnow Valley Studios (Rockfield, Wales)
- Mixed at Whitfield Street Studios (London, England)

Personnel

- Catatonia – writing, production
  - Mark Roberts – writing
- TommyD – production, mixing
- Roland Herrington – mixing
- Joe Gibb – engineering

== Charts ==
Chart (1998)	Peak position
Australia (ARIA)	66
Europe (Eurochart Hot 100)	69
Scotland Singles (OCC)	21
UK Singles (OCC)	20
