= For Tinkerbell =

EP by Catatonia
- Released: May 1993
- Genre: Alternative rock
- Label: Crai
- Producer: Catatonia

Catatonia chronology
For Tinkerbell (1993)	Hooked (1994)

For Tinkerbell is the debut extended play by Welsh band Catatonia, and also their first release. It features five tracks, some of which were later re-recorded on their first studio album Way Beyond Blue. All the tracks were later compiled with those from the Hooked EP on The Crai-EPs 1993/1994.

== Recording ==
For Tinkerbell was self produced by the band, released on the Crai record label. The cover of the extended play was a photograph by Roland Dafis, who was a friend of band members Cerys Matthews and Mark Roberts. He had previously taken photographs for Roberts' former band Y Cyrff, and for For Tinkerbell, the photograph featured a cherub ornament from Dafis' sideboard which he had bought from Poundstretcher.

There were five tracks on the EP; "For Tinkerbell", "New Mercurial Heights", "Dimbran", "Sweet Catatonia" and the Welsh language version of "New Mercurial Heights", "Gyda Gwen". There were concerns from the record label about the song "For Tinkerbell" not being in the Welsh language as liaison Rhys Mwyn was apprehensive about promoting an English language track, since he felt that the song would connect more with Robert's Y Cyrff fanbase if it was in Welsh.

== Release ==
Around two months after release, the EP started to get noticed by the media press. It was named as the single of the week by music magazine NME and BBC Radio 1 DJ Mark Radcliffe played it. He had chosen to do so as he was overwhelmed with the volume of "identakit grunge bands" and "Nirvana-u-likes", and felt that he wanted to support an independent record label and a band "who weren't trying to be anything but themselves". The single had been sent to Iestyn George at NME, who previously knew Matthews but wasn't aware of her as a musician.

Several tracks were re-recorded to appear on Catatonia's first studio album, Way Beyond Blue. All the tracks were later compiled onto The Crai-EPs 1993/1994 alongside those from the band's second EP Hooked, released a year after For Tinkerbell.

== Track listing ==
All tracks are written by Cerys Matthews and Mark Roberts

No.	Title	Length
1.	"For Tinkerbell"	3:48
2.	"New Mercurial Heights"	2:51
3.	"Dimbran"	3:26
4.	"Sweet Catatonia"	3:12
5.	"Gyda Gwên/New Mercurial Heights"	2:51
Total length:		26:24

== Personnel ==
- Cerys Matthews – vocals
- Mark Roberts – guitar
- Clancy Pegg – keyboards
- Paul Jones – bass
- Dafydd Ieuan – drums
