= The Crai-EPs 1993/1994 =

Compilation album by Catatonia
- Released: 19 October 1999
- Genre: Pop, rock
- Length: 26.27
- Label: Crai

Catatonia chronology
Equally Cursed and Blessed (1999)	The Crai-EPs 1993/1994 (1999)	Paper Scissors Stone (2001)

Professional ratings
Review scores
Source	Rating
Allmusic	3/5 stars
NME	(7/10)

The Crai-EPs 1993/1994 is a compilation of two EPs released by the band Catatonia; For Tinkerbell (the first five tracks) and Hooked (the last three tracks). The tracks "For Tinkerbell", "Gyda Gwên" (Welsh version of "New Mercurial Heights") and "Sweet Catatonia" later appeared on the album Way Beyond Blue as newly recorded versions. "Gyda Gwên" as a secret track at the end of the record.

The Hooked portion of this compilation had already been previously released in 1995 as part of another EP compilation by the band titled The Sublime Magic of Catatonia.

== Track listing ==
All tracks are written by Cerys Matthews and Mark Roberts

No.	Title	EP	Length
1.	"For Tinkerbell"	For Tinkerbell	3:48
2.	"New Mercurial Heights"	For Tinkerbell	2:51
3.	"Dimbran"	For Tinkerbell	3:26
4.	"Sweet Catatonia"	For Tinkerbell	3:12
5.	"Gyda Gwên/New Mercurial Heights"	For Tinkerbell	2:51
6.	"Hooked"	Hooked	3:41
7.	"Fall Beside Her"	Hooked	3:13
8.	"Difrycheulyd (Snail Ambition)"	Hooked	3:22
Total length:			26:24

== Personnel ==
- Cerys Matthews – vocals
- Mark Roberts – guitar
- Clancy Pegg – keyboards
- Paul Jones – bass
- Dafydd Ieuan – drums
