= Dead from the Waist Down =

1999 single by Catatonia

Single by Catatonia

from the album Equally Cursed and Blessed
- Released: 29 March 1999
- Studio: Monnow Valley (Rockfield, Wales)
- Length: 4:16
- Label: Blanco y Negro
- Songwriters: Mark Roberts, Catatonia
- Producers: TommyD, Catatonia

Catatonia singles chronology
"Game On" (1998)	"Dead from the Waist Down" (1999)	"Londinium" (1999)

"Dead from the Waist Down" is a song by Welsh rock band Catatonia, taken from their third studio album, Equally Cursed and Blessed. It was written by Mark Roberts with Catatonia and produced by the band and TommyD. Released on 29 March 1999, the song reached number seven on the UK Singles Chart and was the band's only song to chart in New Zealand, where it peaked at number 44.

== Recording and release ==
The first version of "Dead from the Waist Down" was recorded by Mark Roberts of Catatonia on a DPS12 hard disk recorder, while the band was on an American tour. It featured Roberts playing a guitar, as well as rough ideas for the chorus. He had written the song about being on tour in Los Angeles, and having members of the band's entourage who weren't enjoying themselves. It was combined with singer Cerys Matthews' idea to develop a song suitable for BBC Radio 2 and her mother. It was then recorded for the Equally Cursed and Blessed album at Monnow Valley Studios in Rockfield, Monmouthshire, Wales.

== Track listings ==
UK, European, and Australian CD single

1. "Dead from the Waist Down" – 3:51
2. "Branding a Mountain" – 1:56
3. "Bad Bad Boy" – 2:46

UK 7-inch and cassette single

1. "Dead from the Waist Down" – 3:51 (3:40 on 7-inch)
2. "Branding a Mountain" – 1:56

== Credits and personnel ==
Credits are lifted from the Equally Cursed and Blessed album booklet.

Studios

- Recorded at Monnow Valley Studios (Rockfield, Wales)
- Mixed at Whitfield Street Studios (London, England)

Personnel

- Catatonia – writing, production
  - Mark Roberts – writing
- TommyD – production, mixing
- Joe Gibb – engineering
- Roland Herrington – mixing

== Charts ==
=== Weekly charts ===
Chart (1999)	Peak position
Australia (ARIA)	56
Europe (Eurochart Hot 100)	34
New Zealand (Recorded Music NZ)	44
Scotland Singles (OCC)	11
UK Singles (OCC)	7

=== Year-end charts ===
Chart (1999)	Position
UK Singles (OCC)	132
