= The Sublime Magic of Catatonia =

Compilation album by Catatonia
- Released: 1995 (Japan); 1996 (UK)
- Genre: Pop / rock
- Label: Nursery

Catatonia chronology
Hooked (1994)	The Sublime Magic of Catatonia (1995)	Way Beyond Blue (1996)

The Sublime Magic of Catatonia is a compilation of singles and EPs released by the band Catatonia. It combined tracks from the Bleed and Whale singles and the Hooked EP. The first five tracks on this release were later re-recorded for the band's first album, Way Beyond Blue. The Hooked portion of this compilation was again compiled as part of The Crai-EPs 1993/1994 in October 1999.

It was given a three-star rating by AllMusic.

== Track listing ==
All tracks are written by Cerys Matthews and Mark Roberts.

No.	Title	Previous appearance	Length
1.	"Cariadon Ffol (in pregap before Bleed)/Bleed"	“S4C Makes Me Want To Smoke Crack” EP/"Bleed" single
2.	"This Boy Can't Swim"	"Bleed" single
3.	"Painful"	"Bleed" single
4.	"Dream On"	“Volume 12” compilation
5.	"Whale"	"Whale" single
6.	"You Can"	"Whale" single
7.	"Hooked"	Hooked EP
8.	"Fall Beside Her"	Hooked EP
9.	"Difrycheulyd (Snail Ambition)"	Hooked EP
Total length:			26:24

== Personnel ==
- Cerys Matthews – vocals
- Mark Roberts – guitar
- Paul Jones – bass
- Dafydd Ieuan – drums
- Clancy Pegg – keyboards (tracks 7–9)
