= Whale (song) =

Single by Catatonia
- B-side: "You Can"
- Released: 1994
- Genre: Alternative rock
- Label: Rough Trade Records
- Songwriter(s): Cerys Matthews, Mark Roberts

Catatonia singles chronology
| "Whale" (1994) | "Bleed" (1995) |

"Whale" is the debut single by Welsh band Catatonia, released in 1994 as a non-album release on the Rough Trade label. It later appeared on the compilation album The Sublime Magic of Catatonia, and was re-recorded for Catatonia's first studio album, Way Beyond Blue.

== Recording and release ==
A Welsh-language version of the song, "Gwe", was recorded as a session for Radio Cymru on 8 April 1993, and subsequently released in 1995 on an Ankst compilation album.

The English-language "Whale" was first released as part of the Rough Trade record club for new bands, formed by Rough Trade Records. The release was recorded at the Cabin Recording Studios in Coventry. The location was chosen as band member Paul Jones was familiar with it, and Rough Trade had indicated that they would only release the single in September 1994; the band had only been informed of this the month prior.

The single was chosen from several recorded at the studio, with "You Can" as the b-side. "Whale" was later re-released as part of the compilation album, The Sublime Magic of Catatonia. Following a re-recording at Townhouse Studios, with production by Paul Sampson, "Whale" formed part of Catatonia's first studio album, Way Beyond Blue.

== Reception ==
"Whale" was selected as NME magazine's single of the week, calling it a "breathy pop classic, loose-limbed and groovy". Further comparisons were made to popular Britpop band Oasis.
