= TIR (album) =

Studio album by Cerys Matthews
- Released: 21 June 2010
- Genre: Welsh Folk
- Length: 35:52
- Label: Rainbow City Records
- Producer: Cerys Matthews; Ian Tilley

Cerys Matthews chronology
Don't Look Down (2009)	TIR (2010)	Explorer (2011)

TIR (Welsh for "Land") is the fifth studio album by Welsh singer-songwriter Cerys Matthews. It was released on 21 June 2010.

The album reached No. 45 in the UK Independent Chart in September 2010. Matthews described the album as a "labour of love".

== Track listing ==
No.	Title	Writer(s)	Length
1.	"Sosban Fach"	Mynyddog	2:11
2.	"Myfanwy"	Joseph Parry (words by Mynyddog)	3:18
3.	"Bugeilio'r Gwenith Gwyn"	Maria Jane Williams	2:20
4.	"Cân Merthyr"	Traditional	1:24
5.	"Cwm Rhondda"	John Hughes	2:20
6.	"Ar Hyd Y Nos"	Edward Jones	1:33
7.	"Migldi Magldi"	Traditional	2:38
8.	"Calon Lân"	Daniel James	2:33
9.	"Llwyn Onn"	Traditional	2:09
10.	"Ei Di'r Deryn Du?"	Traditional	2:15
11.	"Dafydd y Garreg Wen"	David Owen	1:08
12.	"Mil Harddach Wyt Na'r Rhosyn Gwyn"	Traditional	1:06
13.	"Mae Hen Wlad Fy Nhadau"	Evan James, James James	2:25
14.	"Yr Insiwrans Agent"	Traditional (First covered by Siwsann George)	1:55
15.	"Bachgen Bach O Dincar"	Traditional	1:25
16.	"Ar Lan y Môr"	Traditional	1:58
17.	"Ei Di'r Deryn Du? (Reprise)"	Traditional	3:34
Total length:			35:52

== Credits ==
Credits adapted from the liner notes of TIR

=== Musicians ===
- Cerys Matthews - vocals, guitar, harmonica, melodica, kazoo
- Ian Tilley - celest, harmonium, harmony hums (track 10 & 17)
- Mason Neely - banjo (track 1)
- Mike Farrar - electric guitar, banjo (track 3)

=== Production ===
- Producers - Cerys Matthews, Ian Tilley
- Arrangers - Cerys Matthews (all tracks), Gerallt Jones (track 9)
- Mixer - Ian Tilley

== Charts ==
Chart performance of TIR
Chart (2010)	Peak position
UK Independent Albums (OCC)	45

TIR reached No. 45 on the UK Independent Chart and broke records by becoming the best-selling Welsh-language album of the past ten years.

Cerys' rendition of Calon Lân became her most streamed song yet.

== Collaboration ==
=== Cerys' collaboration with Ballet Cymru ===
In 2012 and 2013, Cerys collaborated with Ballet Cymru to create a work for the dancers of Ballet Cymru, featuring 11 of the songs from TIR. Cerys performed live across venues in Wales such as Newport and Caernarfon in 2012 and then Newport in 2013. She also performed in London in 2012.
