= Lost Cat (song) =

Single by Catatonia

from the album Way Beyond Blue
- Released: 22 April 1996
- Genre: Alternative rock
- Label: Blanco y Negro
- Songwriter: Cerys Matthews/Mark Roberts
- Producer: Stephen Street

Catatonia singles chronology
"Sweet Catatonia" (1996)	"Lost Cat" (1996)	"You've Got a Lot to Answer For" (1996)

"Lost Cat" is a song recorded by the Welsh band Catatonia, taken from their first studio album, Way Beyond Blue. It was written by Cerys Matthews and Mark Roberts, and produced by Stephen Street.

== Recording and release ==
Elfyn Lewis created the cover artwork for the single, which was released on 22 April 1996. This coincided with the middle of a UK tour the band were on at the time, intended to maximise press exposure. During the production of the video, the London Fire Brigade were called out by a passer-by, who reported that a woman was stuck up a lamppost. It was singer Cerys Matthews.

The single reached 41st position in the UK charts, just missing out becoming the band's first top 40 hit. The band were pleased with the position, which had been their highest-charting release to date.

== Charts ==
Chart (1998)	Peak position
UK Singles Chart	41
