= Stone by Stone (song) =

2001 single by Catatonia

- UK single release

Single by Catatonia

from the album Paper Scissors Stone
- Released: 23 July 2001
- Length: 3:57
- Label: Blanco y Negro
- Songwriters: Mark Roberts, Catatonia
- Producers: TommyD, Catatonia

Catatonia singles chronology
"Karaoke Queen" (1999)	"Stone by Stone" (2001)

"Stone by Stone" is a song by the Welsh band Catatonia from their fourth studio album, Paper Scissors Stone (2001). It was written by Mark Roberts and the band, and produced by TommyD. Released as the only single from the album in July 2001, the song peaked at number 19 on the UK singles chart, becoming Catatonia's final chart hit.

== Recording and release ==
"Stone by Stone" was released on the Blanco y Negro label on 23 July 2001. It reached number 19 on the UK singles chart. There were rumours that the band was about to break up, fueled by singer Cerys Matthews entering drug rehabilitation for drinking and smoking. The rumours were denied a month after the release of "Stone by Stone", but confirmed on 21 September, making this the final single release for the band.

== Reception ==
Timothy Mark at NME gave the song a score of one out of ten, describing it "lumpen, the voice grating". He added that the band were "fading from the public consciousness quicker than Shane Ritchie [sic]" and describing them as "awkwardly out of date". Cyd James of Dotmusic was more favourable, writing: "Highly infectious with a huge, soaraway string-swathed chorus, 'Stone By Stone' is a surefire hit."

== Charts ==
Chart (2001)	Peak position
Europe (Eurochart Hot 100)	76
Scottish Singles Sales (Official Charts)	19
UK Singles (Official Charts)	19

== Release history ==
Region	Date	Format(s)	Label(s)	Ref.
United Kingdom	23 July 2001	CD; cassette; DVD	Blanco y Negro	
Australia	20 August 2001	CD	Blanco y Negro	
