= Way Beyond Blue =

Studio album by Catatonia
- Released: 30 September 1996
- Genres: Alternative rock; indie pop
- Length: 47:41
- Label: Blanco y Negro
- Producers: Stephen Street, Paul Sampson, Catatonia

Catatonia chronology
The Sublime Magic of Catatonia (1995)	Way Beyond Blue (1996)	International Velvet (1998)

Singles from Way Beyond Blue
- 1. "Sweet Catatonia" Released: 18 January 1996; 2. "Lost Cat" Released: 22 April 1996; 3. "You've Got a Lot to Answer For" Released: 26 August 1996; 4. "Bleed (reissue)" Released: 1996

Way Beyond Blue is the debut album by the Welsh band Catatonia. It has been seen by many fans as being something of a compilation album, as all but five songs on the album had appeared on one of the band's early EPs or singles, albeit in different renditions (see below). It spawned the band's first top 40 hit, "You've Got a Lot to Answer For", which hit No. 35.

== Critical reception ==
Professional ratings
Review scores
Source	Rating
AllMusic	4.5/5 stars
The Guardian	4/5 stars
NME	8/10
Q	3/5 stars
Select	4/5
Vox	8/10

In Melody Maker, David Bennun highlighted Catatonia's sense of "dreaminess" on Way Beyond Blue and compared listening to the album to "swimming in your own thoughts, cotton wool and clouds studded with hidden pins." The Guardian's Caroline Sullivan concluded that "'Lost Cat' and 'Sweet Catatonia', creamy janglefests both, are among the best things to have emerged from the nascent Welsh scene."

AllMusic reviewer Stephen Thomas Erlewine later called Way Beyond Blue "an infectious set of jangle pop, injected with the punkish attitude of indie rock", adding that "the guitars ring as if they were recorded in the late '80s, but it has a muscular backbone, and vocalist Cerys Matthews has a tough edge to her voice, which never makes the music sound weak."

== Track listing ==
All tracks are written by Cerys Matthews and Mark Roberts unless otherwise noted.

No.	Title	Previous appearance	Length
1.	"Lost Cat"	N/A	2:32
2.	"Sweet Catatonia"	For Tinkerbell EP	2:43
3.	"Some Half Baked Ideal Called Wonderful"	N/A	3:10
4.	"You've Got a Lot to Answer For"	N/A	3:16
5.	"Infantile" (Matthews, Roberts, Paul Jones)	N/A	4:28
6.	"Dream On"	The Sublime Magic of Catatonia	2:37
7.	"Bleed"	"Bleed" single	2:30
8.	"This Boy Can't Swim"	"Bleed" single	3:01
9.	"Painful"	"Bleed" single	2:39
10.	"Whale"	"Whale" single	2:54
11.	"For Tinkerbell"	For Tinkerbell EP	4:10
12.	"Way Beyond Blue" (contains hidden track "Gyda Gwên (With a Smile)")	N/A	13:31

2015 reissue bonus disc
No.	Title	Length
1.	"Blow the Millennium, Blow"
2.	"Beautiful Sailor"
3.	"Tourist"
4.	"Acapulco Gold"
5.	"Cut You Inside" (Demo)
6.	"To and Fro"
7.	"All Girls Are Fly"
8.	"Indigo Blind"
9.	"Sweet Catatonia" (Live)
10.	"Whale" (Live)
11.	"Bleed" (Version 2)
12.	"Do You Believe in Me?"
13.	"Dimbran"
14.	"You Can"
15.	"All Girls Are Fly" (Da-De? Remix)
16.	"Blow the Millennium, Blow" (Splott Remix)
17.	"Do You Believe in Me?" (Live)
18.	"Way Beyond Blue" (Live)
19.	"Painful" (Live)
20.	"Bleed" (Live)

== Personnel ==
- Cerys Matthews – vocals
- Mark Roberts – guitar
- Owen Powell – guitar
- Paul Jones – bass
- Aled Richards – drums (tracks 1–5, 7, 9, 11)
- Dafydd Ieuan – drums (tracks 2, 6–8, 10, 12)
