= The Platinum Collection (Catatonia album) =

Compilation album by Catatonia
- Released: 21 March 2006
- Genre: Pop / Rock

Catatonia chronology
Greatest Hits (2002)	The Platinum Collection (2006)	Road Rage: The Best of Catatonia (2011)

Professional ratings
Review scores
Source	Rating
AllMusic	4/5 stars

The Platinum Collection is a compilation album of Catatonia's songs ranging from 1994 to 2001.

Unlike the previous compilation, Greatest Hits in 2002, The Platinum Collection includes songs from their early EPs released prior to the 1996 album Way Beyond Blue.

Platinum Collection contains no previously unreleased tracks, but is said to be "remastered"; however, there is no discernible difference in comparison with previous releases.

This release also contains a higher ratio of non-single releases than the Greatest Hits, instead seemingly favouring B-Sides and album tracks more.

== Track listing ==
1. "Sweet Catatonia" (Single)
2. "Lost Cat" (Single)
3. "You've Got a Lot to Answer For" (Single)
4. "Dimbran" (B-Side)
5. "For Tinkerbell" (Single)
6. "Mulder and Scully" (Single)
7. "Road Rage" (Single)
8. "I'm Cured" (B-Side)
9. "Strange Glue" (Single)
10. "International Velvet"
11. "She's a Millionaire"
12. "Storm the Palace"
13. "Dazed, Beautiful and Bruised"
14. "Bulimic Beats"
15. "Godspeed"
16. "The Mother of Misogyny"
17. "Imaginary Friend"
18. "All Girls Are Fly" (B-Side)
