= Egmond =

Egmond may refer to:

- Egmond (municipality), a former municipality, now merged with Bergen, North Holland, comprising:
  - Egmond Abbey, a Benedictine monastery
  - Egmond-Binnen, a village, built around Egmond Abbey
  - Egmond aan den Hoef where the remains of Egmond Castle are
  - Egmond aan Zee, a popular seaside resort town and former 19th century artist colony
- House of Egmond, an extinct family named after the Dutch town of Egmond
- Egmond (company), a manufacturer of musical instruments from the Netherlands (1932-1983)

== People ==
- Adalbert of Egmond (died c. 710), Northumbrian Anglo-Saxon missionary
- Derk van Egmond (born 1956), a former Dutch track cyclist
- Gary van Egmond (born 1965), an Australian former football (soccer)
- Jacobus van Egmond, 1908–1969), a Dutch track cyclist who competed at the 1932 Summer Olympics.
- Max van Egmond (born 1936), a Dutch bass and baritone singer

== See also ==
- Egmont (disambiguation)
