= Karaoke Queen =

1999 single by Catatonia

Single by Catatonia

from the album Equally Cursed and Blessed
- Released: 1 November 1999
- Label: Blanco y Negro
- Songwriter: Cerys Matthews

Catatonia singles chronology
"Londinium" (1999)	"Karaoke Queen" (1999)	"Stone by Stone" (2001)

"Karaoke Queen" is a song by Welsh rock group Catatonia taken from the album Equally Cursed and Blessed and inspired by the talent TV show Stars in Their Eyes.

"Karaoke Queen" was originally intended as the follow-up single to "Dead from the Waist Down", until the record label insisted that "Londinium" be released as the second single from the album, against the band's wishes. "Karaoke Queen" was released as the third single on 1 November 1999, and reached number 36 on the UK Singles Chart. Cerys wrote the track after a night out in Ibiza with Dai Morris of Dai's Cwtch and relates the tale of her falling off the stage while performing karaoke at Murphy's Irish Bar in San Antonio.

== Critical reception ==
NME reviewer David Stubbs condemned the single as "one kitschy, tiara-ed, Martini-chugging, ironic, scaly old ’80s night, absolute arsehole of a tune as Cerys and the dobbins go out low-key clubbing. Just… just stop it with your fourth singles off the album, will you?"
