= Paper, Scissors, Stone =

Paper, Scissors, Stone may refer to:

- Rock paper scissors, a hand game
- Nemesis Game, a film directed and written by Jesse Warn called Paper, Scissors, Stone in Canada
- Paper Scissors Stone (album), an album by Welsh band Catatonia
