= David Hilowitz =

- Born: 1981 (age 44–45); Boston, Massachusetts, United States
- Genres: Electronic; Soundtrack; Ambient; indie rock
- Occupations: Composer, YouTuber, software developer
- Years active: 1999–present
- Label: West Cortez Records
- Website: davidhilowitz.com

David Hilowitz (born 1981) is an American composer, YouTuber, and software developer based in Philadelphia, Pennsylvania. He is known for his YouTube channel "David Hilowitz Music," which features DIY musical experiments and synthesizer projects, as well as for creating Decent Sampler, a widely used free sampling plugin. He also performs as the frontman of the indie rock project Manwomanchild.

== Career ==
=== YouTube ===
Hilowitz's YouTube channel "David Hilowitz Music" focuses on DIY musical experiments, synthesizer projects, and instrument building. The channel has grown to over 422,000 subscribers as of January 2025. His videos often feature documentary-style storytelling, drawing on his experience producing podcasts in 2015–2016.

Notable projects featured on the channel include building a violin with a spring reverb tank salvaged from a broken Fender amplifier inside the body, turning an electric toothbrush into a synthesizer, creating a music sequencer from a bicycle wheel, modifying a Squier Mustang guitar, and rescuing a guitar that had been left outside for five years and converting it into a basitar. Other projects have included using a record cutter as a synthesizer and creating guitar distortion effects from thrift store cassette players. Hilowitz has also produced demonstration videos for Chase Bliss Audio pedals, including the Generation Loss MKII, Habit, and Lossy.

=== Decent Sampler ===
In 2020, Hilowitz released Decent Sampler, a free sampling plugin and ecosystem for creating and distributing sample libraries. The software was developed in response to limitations Hilowitz observed in existing sampling solutions, particularly the inability to easily redistribute sample instruments to users who didn't own commercial sampling software. Decent Sampler has grown to over 100,000 users worldwide and includes the ability to download sample libraries directly within the plugin interface.

Hilowitz developed Decent Sampler, a free multisampling engine. The plugin was developed using the JUCE framework for audio programming and is available in VST, VST3, AAX, and standalone formats on Mac, Windows, and Linux, as well as an AUv3 version for iOS. The plugin allows users to access sample libraries from Pianobook and supports the DecentSampler format (.dspreset and .dslibrary files). He has also released commercial plugins including Refractions, an effects plugin that began as a two-to-three hour prototype. The development of Decent Sampler and related tools represents Hilowitz's long-standing interest in audio plugin development, dating back to 1999 when he first experimented with the Steinberg VST SDK in high school.

=== Manwomanchild ===
Hilowitz founded the indie rock project Manwomanchild in Rhode Island in 2008. The band relocated to Philadelphia in 2013. Manwomanchild's sound is characterized by the use of unconventional instruments, including obscure synthesizers, toy keyboards, vintage guitars, and experimental production techniques. The project is primarily a solo endeavor, with Hilowitz performing most instruments. The band's lineup for their EP and debut album consisted of David Hilowitz on vocals, guitars, and synths, Mason Neely on drums, and Craig Gifford on bass.

Manwomanchild released its self-titled debut album on December 14, 2010, via West Cortez Records. A second album, Awkward Island, was released on June 28, 2016. In April 2014, the band wrote and recorded the soundtrack for the iOS and Android game "Floyd's Worthwhile Endeavor" by Decidedly.

=== Solo work ===
As a solo artist, Hilowitz creates ambient and electronic music that explores the intersection between modular synthesis and violin. His compositions often feature atmospheric soundscapes created with his collection of synthesizers. Notable solo releases include the single "Dusty Planets" (2022) and the album Electronic I: Music for Video (January 2025).

Hilowitz has also worked as a film composer and previously worked as a software developer for various technology startups before transitioning to focus on music and content creation full-time.

== Working method ==
Hilowitz employs a rotational schedule, dedicating approximately five to six days at a time to different aspects of his work. Video production typically consumes five to six days, followed by programming and software development work, with administrative tasks like email handled on designated days. He has noted that programming in the morning often improves his musical creativity, allowing him to approach composition with a problem-solving mindset.
