= You've Got a Lot to Answer For =

Single by Catatonia

from the album Way Beyond Blue
- B-side: "Do You Believe In Me?"
- Released: 26 August 1996
- Genre: Alternative rock
- Length: 3:16
- Label: Blanco y Negro
- Songwriters: Cerys Matthews; Mark Roberts

Catatonia singles chronology
"Lost Cat" (1996)	"You've Got a Lot to Answer For" (1996)	"Bleed" (1996)

"You've Got A Lot To Answer For" is a song written by Cerys Matthews and Mark Roberts and recorded by Welsh rock band Catatonia. Taken from their debut album, Way Beyond Blue, it became the band's first Top 40 hit, peaking at no. 35, largely due to a campaign started by BBC Radio 1 DJs Mark and Lard.

The B-side is "Do You Believe In Me?"
