= Stone by Stone =

Stone by Stone may refer to:

- Stone by Stone (album), a 2006 album by Floater
- "Stone by Stone" (song), a 2001 song by Catatonia
