= Sweet Catatonia =

1996 single by Catatonia

Single by Catatonia

from the album Way Beyond Blue
- Released: 1996
- Genre: Alternative rock
- Label: Blanco y Negro
- Songwriter(s): Cerys Matthews/Mark Roberts
- Producer(s): Paul Sampson/Stephen Street

Catatonia singles chronology
"Bleed" (1995)	"Sweet Catatonia" (1996)	"Lost Cat" (1996)

"Sweet Catatonia" is a song recorded by the Welsh band Catatonia, taken from their first studio album, Way Beyond Blue. It was written by Cerys Matthews and Mark Roberts, and produced by Paul Sampson and Stephen Street. The title of the track was the original name for the band.

== Recording and release ==
Sweet Catatonia had originally been recorded in 1993, and appeared on their "For Tinkerbell" EP that year. The re-recorded version was released as a single on 18 January 1996, with a cover painted by Elfyn Lewis. He was the housemate of band members, Cerys Matthews and Mark Roberts, and would go on the paint three single and one album covers for Catatonia. A launch party was held at The Louisiana, Bristol. The name "Sweet Catatonia" had been the original title for the band, when it was a duo of Matthews and Roberts.

The single received a great deal of press coverage, increasing the expectations of both the band and the label, but only peaked at number 61 in the charts. But, this was the first time a Catatonia song had entered the UK charts.

== Charts ==
Chart (1998)	Peak position
UK Singles Chart	61
