= Equally Cursed and Blessed =

Studio album by Catatonia
- Released: 12 April 1999
- Recorded: 1998–1999
- Studios: Monnow Valley (Monmouth, Wales)
- Genres: Pop, rock
- Length: 44:49
- Label: Blanco y Negro
- Producers: TommyD, Catatonia

Catatonia chronology
International Velvet (1998)	Equally Cursed and Blessed (1999)	The Crai-EPs 1993/1994 (1999)

Singles from Equally Cursed and Blessed
- 1. "Dead from the Waist Down" Released: 29 March 1999; 2. "Londinium" Released: 12 July 1999; 3. "Karaoke Queen" Released: 1 November 1999

Equally Cursed and Blessed is the third studio album by Welsh band Catatonia, released in April 1999 via Blanco y Negro Records. It reached number one on the UK Albums Chart, and three singles were released from it: "Dead from the Waist Down", "Londinium" and "Karaoke Queen".

== Recording ==
While touring in the United States following the success of their second studio album, International Velvet, Catatonia recorded sample demos onto a DPS12 hard disk recorder in their tour bus upon the recommendation of their producer, TommyD. They returned to the Monnow Valley Studio in Monmouth, Wales, where they had recorded the previous album, to record Equally Cursed and Blessed.

== Release and promotion ==
Professional ratings
Review scores
Source	Rating
AllMusic	4/5 stars
Entertainment Weekly	B+
The Guardian	4/5 stars
The Independent	2/5 stars
NME	6/10
Q	4/5 stars
Rolling Stone	3.5/5 stars
Select	4/5
Spin	5/10
Uncut	4/5 stars

The album was announced in January 1999; the title taken from a line in the song "She's a Millionaire". The first single, "Dead from the Waist Down" was released on 29 March 1999, with the album released on 12 April. This repeated the release schedule used for International Velvet, which had been preceded by "Mulder and Scully" by the same period of time.

Equally Cursed and Blessed faced competition from ABBA's 1992 compilation album Gold: Greatest Hits for the number one spot on the UK Albums Chart, as the ABBA album had re-charted due to the success of the Mamma Mia! musical featuring the band's songs. But by midweek, the Catatonia album was 15,000 sales ahead and it went on to secure the top place in the chart. At the time, all three Catatonia studio albums were in the top 40. Equally Cursed and Blessed went on to be certified platinum by the British Phonographic Industry showing at least 300,000 copies sold. The American release of the album saw two tracks from International Velvet added, including "Road Rage".

=== Singles ===
The album spawned one top-10 single, "Dead from the Waist Down", which reached number seven on the UK Singles Chart. The band had intended to release "Karaoke Queen" as the follow-up, but were overruled by the record label and they were forced to release "Londinium" on 12 July 1999 instead. This angered lead singer Cerys Matthews, as did the expense of the video for the single which had cost more than Equally Cursed and Blessed took to make. "Londinium" failed to reach the top ten, placing at number 20. "Karaoke Queen" was released as the third single on 1 November 1999 but stalled at number 36. "Nothing Hurts" was slated to be the fourth single release from the album but was shelved following the low chart placement of "Karaoke Queen". For the release of the Make Hay Not War: The Blanco Y Negro Years boxset, released on Cherry Red in 2023, the song "Karaoke Queen" was removed from the reissue of this album at the band's request.

== In other media ==
Bulimic Beats featured in the BBC TV show Marion and Geoff as both incidental and theme music. The song also appears in the prequel film, A Small Summer Party.

== Track listing ==
No.	Title	Writer(s)	Length
1.	"Dead from the Waist Down"	Mark Roberts, Catatonia	4:16
2.	"Londinium"	Roberts, Catatonia	4:36
3.	"Post Script"	Cerys Matthews, Roberts, Catatonia	4:56
4.	"She's a Millionaire"	Roberts, Catatonia	4:22
5.	"Storm the Palace"	Mark Roberts, Catatonia	2:38
6.	"Karaoke Queen (later removed from 2023)"	Matthews, Catatonia	5:06
7.	"Bulimic Beats"	Matthews, Catatonia	3:43
8.	"Valerian"	Matthews, Catatonia	4:21
9.	"Shoot the Messenger"	Matthews, Paul Jones, Catatonia	3:58
10.	"Nothing Hurts"	Owen Powell, Catatonia	3:11
11.	"Dazed, Beautiful and Bruised"	Powell, Catatonia	3:42

US release bonus tracks
No.	Title	Length
12.	"Road Rage"	5:10
13.	"Mulder and Scully"	4:10
14.	"Road Rage" (Enhanced video)	4:18

Bonus one-sided 7" included with LP release
No.	Title	Length
1.	"Nothing Hurts (live)"	3:29

2015 reissue bonus disc
No.	Title	Length
1.	"Nothing Hurts" (live)	3:29
2.	"Dead from the Waist Down" (radio edit)	3:40
3.	"Branding a Mountain"	1:57
4.	"Bad Bad Boy"	2:49
5.	"Intercontinental Sigh"	2:56
6.	"Apathy Revolution"	4:20
7.	"Karaoke Queen" (remix)	4:17
8.	"Don't Wanna Talk About It"	3:35
9.	"Karaoke Queen" (remix edit)	3:48
10.	"Karaoke Queen" (remix edit) (karaoke version)	3:48
11.	"Dead from the Waist Down" (karaoke version)	3:51

== Personnel ==
- Cerys Matthews – vocals
- Mark Roberts – guitar
- Owen Powell – guitar
- Paul Jones – bass
- Aled Richards – drums

== Charts ==
=== Weekly charts ===
Chart (1999)	Peak position
Australian Albums (ARIA)	48
New Zealand Albums (RMNZ)	28
Scottish Albums (Official Charts)	2
UK Albums (Official Charts)	1

=== Year-end charts ===
Chart (1999)	Position
UK Albums (OCC)	47

== Certifications ==
Region	Certification	Certified units/sales
United Kingdom (BPI)	Platinum	300,000^{^}
^{^} Shipments figures based on certification alone.
