= Never Said Goodbye =

Studio album by Cerys Matthews
- Released: 21 August 2006
- Length: 45:19
- Label: Rough Trade

Cerys Matthews chronology
Cockahoop (2003)	Never Said Goodbye (2006)	Don't Look Down (2009)

Singles from Never Said Goodbye
- 1. "Open Roads" Released: 7 August 2006; 2. "A Bird in Hand" Released: 14 August 2006

Never Said Goodbye is the second solo studio album by Welsh singer-songwriter Cerys Matthews. It was released on 21 August 2006 by Rough Trade Records. Matthews co-produced the album with Ben Elkins and Stuart Sikes.

The album received generally positive reviews from music critics, who noted its folk influences and "expansive" sound compared with its predecessor, Cockahoop. Never Said Goodbye peaked at no. 1 on the UK Independent Albums chart.

== Release and promotion ==
"Open Roads" was released as the album's lead single on 7 August 2006. The maxi single included covers of "Soul Love" by David Bowie and "Grace Cathedral Hill" by The Decemberists. Ahead of the album's release, Matthews embarked on a UK tour which began on 27 July 2006 at Llangollen Town Hall and concluded with a headline slot at Cardiff Big Weekend festival on 6 August 2006.

== Critical reception ==
Professional ratings
Review scores
Source	Rating
AllMusic	2.5/5 stars
The Independent	3.5/5 stars
The Skinny	3/5 stars

Sharon Mawer of AllMusic gave Never Said Goodbye a mixed review, noting its "pleasant folky numbers" though opining that various moments are "just too slow". Simon Price of The Independent described the album as a more "confident affair" than Matthews' previous album Cockahoop, and "a polite, bijou piece of work which rewards your attention but never demands it." Nicole Keiper of The Tennessean described Never Said Goodbye as a "far more pop-rocked up affair" than its predecessor. Naomi West of The Daily Telegraph opined that the album is "huge [and] expansive of spirit and sound" featuring "songs backed with dense arrangements of pounding drums, eccentric backing vocals and squirling organs". Jon Seller of The Skinny magazine described Never Said Goodbye as an "interesting if at times pedestrian album" featuring "easy-going beats, pleasant guitar and Matthews' trademark domineering vocals".

== Track listing ==
No.	Title	Writer(s)	Length
1.	"Streets of New York"	Cerys Matthews	4:37
2.	"A Bird in Hand"	Matthews	3:32
3.	"Oxygen"	Matthews	4:31
4.	"Open Roads"	Matthews; Jonny Male; John Smith	4:37
5.	"This Endless Rain"	Matthews; Kevin Teel	3:42
6.	"Blue Light Alarm"	Matthews; Teel	3:42
7.	"Morning Sunshine"	Matthews; Gruff Rhys	2:31
8.	"Seed Song"	Matthews; Male; Pete Smith	5:05
9.	"What Kind of Man"	Matthews	1:18
10.	"Ruby"	Matthews	3:21
11.	"Elen"	Matthews; Rhys	8:44
Total length:			45:19

== Credits ==
Credits adapted from the liner notes of Never Said Goodbye.

=== Musicians ===
- Cerys Matthews - vocals, guitars
- Kevin Teel - guitars
- Gruff Rhys - acoustic guitar (track 11), vocals (tracks 3 & 11)
- Matt Martin - acoustic guitar (track 7), percussion (tracks 7 & 11)
- William Tyler - acoustic guitar (track 11)
- Mason Neely - drums (all tracks except 2, 10 & 11)
- Jeremy Lutito - drums (tracks 2 & 10)
- Brad Pemberton - drums (track 11)
- Byron House - bass (tracks 1–6, 8–9)
- Jeff Irwin - bass (tracks 7, 10, 11), euphonium (track 6)
- James Haggerty - bass (track 10)
- Ben Elkins - keyboards, backing vocals, programming
- Troy Johnson - additional piano (track 11)
- Eric Darken - percussion
- Todd Kemp - additional percussion (track 11)
- Janice Corder, Everett Drake, Ann McRary - backing vocals (tracks 2, 8 & 11)
- Sam Ashworth - backing vocals (track 4)
- Lloyd Barry, Vinnie Ciesieski - trumpets
- Roy Agee - trombone
- Jay Phillips - trombone (track 6)

=== Production ===
- Producers - Cerys Matthews, Stuart Sikes, Ben Elkins
- Engineers - Stuart Sikes, Jeremy Ferguson
- Arrangers - Ben Elkins, Cerys Matthews
- Mixer - Jeremy Ferguson
- Mastering - Andrew Mendelson
- A&R - Seth Riddle

== Charts ==
Chart performance of Never Said Goodbye
Chart (2006)	Peak position
UK Albums (OCC)	43
UK Independent Albums (OCC)	1
