= Greatest Hits (Catatonia album) =

Greatest hits album by Catatonia
- Released: 15 October 2002
- Genre: Pop / Rock
- Label: WEA

Catatonia chronology
Paper Scissors Stone (2001)	Greatest Hits (2002)	The Platinum Collection (2006)

Professional ratings
Review scores
Source	Rating
NME	(7/10)

Greatest Hits is a compilation album of Welsh alternative rock band Catatonia's best known songs, mainly the singles, but also includes collaborations between Cerys Matthews with Space (on "The Ballad of Tom Jones") and with Tom Jones himself (on "Baby, It's Cold Outside").

The album was released as a 1CD and 2CD limited edition. The second disc of the two CD edition included lesser known album only tracks and some B-Sides, where although 10 tracks are listed, two hidden tracks are included at the end; "All Girls Are Fly" and "Blues Song".

Despite the band having not releasing any new material since their splitting following their last album, Paper Scissors Stone, yet another compilation was released in 2006, The Platinum Collection.

== Critical reaction ==
Joe Goodden, writing for the BBC's Wales Music section, said: "Greatest Hits, a non-chronological run through their singles, is for the most part a cracking ride. 'Road Rage' and 'Mulder And Scully' sound as fresh today as they first did on the radio, and 'You've Got A Lot To Answer For' was a perfect realisation of the terrors of home pregnancy testing."

I review in entertainment.ie said: "this 15-track singles collection arrives as the perfect reminder of the band's all-too-brief time in the spotlight. Catatonia weren't a great band, exactly their sound was too generically indie for that. But they had two major assets: their ear for a winning melody and Matthews's genuine star quality, ..."

Dave Thompson, writing in Allmusic said: "A sensibly titled 15-track epitaph to one of the most premature of all the Brit-pop bandwagon's many casualties, Greatest Hits rounds up each of Catatonia's major U.K. hits, alongside a clutch of well-chosen album cuts and, by way of completeness, the two duets that further established vocalist Cerys Matthews among the country's best-loved performers ... "

== Track listing ==
Disc 1

1. "Mulder and Scully"
2. "The Ballad of Tom Jones" (Space & Cerys Matthews)
3. "Strange Glue"
4. "Road Rage"
5. "Stone by Stone"
6. "Londinium"
7. "Game On"
8. "Dead From the Waist Down"
9. "You've Got a Lot to Answer For"
10. "Baby, It's Cold Outside" (Tom Jones & Cerys Matthews)
11. "Karaoke Queen"
12. "Lost Cat"
13. "I Am the Mob"
14. "Sweet Catatonia"
15. "Bleed"

Disc 2 (Limited edition bonus disc)

1. "Do You Believe in Me?" (B-Side)
2. "The Mother of Misogyny"
3. "Indigo Blind" (B-Side)
4. "Godspeed"
5. "Imaginary Friend"
6. "Way Beyond Blue"
7. "Dream On"
8. "Whale"
9. "Branding a Mountain" (B-Side)
10. "Acapulco Gold" (B-Side, contains hidden tracks "All Girls Are Fly" and "Blues Song")

== Certifications ==
Region	Certification	Certified units/sales
United Kingdom (BPI)	Silver	60,000^{‡}
^{‡} Sales+streaming figures based on certification alone.
