= Egmont =

Egmont may refer to:

- Egmont Group, a media corporation founded and rooted in Copenhagen, Denmark
- Egmond family (often spelled "Egmont"), an influential Dutch family, lords of the town of Egmond
  - Lamoral, Count of Egmont (1522–1568), the best known member of the Egmont family
- Egmont (play), a play by Goethe, about Lamoral, Count of Egmond
- Egmont (Beethoven), the overture and incidental music by Beethoven composed for the play
- Egmond (municipality), a town in North Holland, the Netherlands
- Egmont pact, a Belgian political agreement (1977)
- Egmont Palace, in Brussels, Belgium
- Egmont Islands, a group of Indian Ocean islands, part of the Chagos Archipelago
- EGMONT – The Royal Institute for International Relations, a think tank in Brussels, Belgium
- Mount Egmont is the former name for Mount Taranaki in New Zealand
  - Egmont National Park, a national park at Mount Taranaki, now known as Te Papakura o Taranaki.
  - Egmont (New Zealand electorate), a former electoral district in Taranaki, New Zealand
  - Egmont Village, a village north of Mount Taranaki
- Egmont (electoral district), a Federal Canadian electoral district
- Egmont Group of Financial Intelligence Units, and the international network of Financial Intelligence Units
- Egmont Key State Park, located in Florida, US
- Egmont, British Columbia, a town in British Columbia, Canada
- HMS Egmont, the name of several ships of the Royal Navy
- Egmont H. Petersens Kollegium, a Dormitory in Copenhagen
- Lake Egmont, Nova Scotia
- Earl of Egmont, an extinct title in the Peerage of Ireland

== See also ==
- Egmond (disambiguation)
