= Manwomanchild =

- Origin: Providence, Rhode Island, USA
- Genres: Indie rock
- Years active: 2009 – present
- Website: Official website

Manwomanchild is a rock band from Philadelphia, Pennsylvania fronted by David Hilowitz. The band was started in Rhode Island in 2008. In February 2010, the band release a self-titled EP recorded at Machines with Magnets in Pawtucket, RI. The band's lineup for the EP and album consisted of David Hilowitz on vocals, guitars, and synths, Mason Neely on drums, and Craig Gifford on bass. In May 2010, Manwomanchild released the song "Chile La Roja" in support of Chile's 2010 World Cup team. The song was featured in four national newspapers and on two Chilean TV networks.

The band released its self-titled debut album on 14 December 2010 on West Cortez Records.

In 2013, Manwomanchild moved to Philadelphia. In April 2014, wrote and recorded the soundtrack for Decidedly's iOS and Android game "Floyd's Worthwhile Endeavor".

In September and October 2014, the band released the singles "Wedding Toast" and "Recent History", followed by another, "The Telepath Returns," in December of the same year.

In March 2015, "The Difficult Years" was released. Music blog "Surviving the Golden Age" described the song's sound as "LCD Soundsystem being fronted by Ben Gibbard" as well as "hybrid glam rock/chamber pop".
