= Colours (Graffiti6 album) =

2010 album by Graffiti6

Studio album by Graffiti6
- Released: 24 September 2010
- Recorded: 2010
- Genre: Indie pop, alternative rock, folk music, soul music, blues
- Label: N.W. Free Music

Colours is the debut album by Graffiti6 originally released in 2010 on N.W. Free Music. It was re-released in 2012 on the label Capitol Records for wider distribution.

Professional ratings
Review scores
Source	Rating
AllMusic	4/5 stars
The Independent	5/5 stars

== Track listing ==
=== 2010 N.W. Free Music release ===
All tracks written by Jamie Scott / TommyD compositions except for "Stare into the Sun" that is a Scott/Danvers/Woodford composition)

1. "Stone in My Heart" (3:08)
2. "Annie You Save Me" (3:42)
3. "Stare Into the Sun" (3:56)
4. "This Man" (5:42)
5. "Free" (4:42)
6. "Calm The Storm" (5:32)
7. "Colours" (5:17)
8. "Goodbye Geoffrey Drake" (4:16)
9. "Never Look Back" (3:27)
10. "Stop Mary" (3:50)
11. "Lay Me Down" (4:14)
12. "Over You" (4:29)

=== 2012 N.W. Free Music/Capitol Records release ===
Colours (2012)

Studio album by Graffiti6
- Released: 24 February 2012
- Recorded: 2010
- Label: N.W. Free Music / Capitol Records

The joint rerelease contains the same track list in addition to bonus tracks

13. "Starlight" (3:30)
14. "Love Don't Conquer Me" (3:54)
15. "Stare Into the Sun" (Stripped) (3:23)
16. "Free" (Stripped) (4:47)

== Charts ==
The album reached number 85 on the US Billboard 200 albums chart. The album also charted in the Netherlands where it reached number 32 in the Dutch Albums Chart.
