= Egmond (company) =

Former Dutch guitar manufacturing company

Egmond N.V.
- Company type: Private company
- Industry: Musical instruments
- Founded: 1932
- Founder: Uilke Egmond
- Defunct: 1983
- Headquarters: Eindhoven, Best, Boxtel, Netherlands
- Products: Guitars, basses, banjos, mandolins, amplifiers, accordions

Egmond N.V. was a Dutch musical-instrument manufacturer based in the Eindhoven region, known primarily for producing affordable guitars during the 1950s and 1960s. The company became Europe's largest manufacturer of budget guitars during the rock and roll era.

== History ==
=== Origins ===
The company originated from Musica, a music school and shop founded in 1932 by Uilke Egmond (1878–1959), a former stationmaster in Valkenswaard and accomplished amateur violinist. In the music school he gave violin lessons, while the shop sold instruments mainly imported from Eastern Europe. After retiring at age 55, Egmond supplemented his pension through these activities.

In 1935, the business moved to Eindhoven. The shop relocated during World War II to the corner of Wal and Kerkstraat.

=== Family business expansion ===
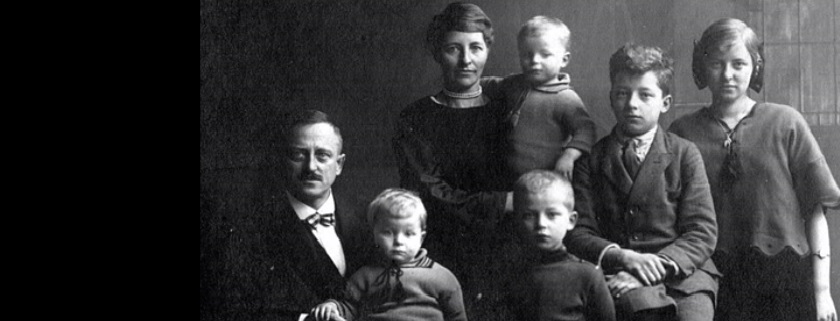
Left to right: Uilke Gerard, Jaap, Annie Dekker with Dick in her arms, Johan, Piet and Annie. Eldest son Gerard is absent from this photo.

Uilke's sons Gerard (1904–1974), Dick (1920–1992), and Jaap (1921–1993) joined the company during World War II. When the import of instruments ended, they decided to manufacture instruments themselves. From 1935 onwards, the company began manufacturing instruments, initially Spanish and Hawaiian guitars, starting in a shed on Gestelsestraat and later moving to Frankrijkstraat. Production was limited to approximately one guitar per week in 1940.

After World War II, the four Egmond brothers (Gerard, Dick, Jaap, and Piet) established a division of labor: Gerard served as president-director-general, Piet managed accounting, Dick oversaw production, and Jaap handled electronics and design. Early production focused on affordable acoustic instruments, with internal labels bearing the company name "Egmond Frères" (in French), later changed to "Egmond Brothers." Daughter Annie was a teacher and had no interest in the family business. Production of banjos and mandolins was added in the early 1950s.

=== Peak production ===
By the early 1950s there were 20 employees producing 50 guitars per week. Around 1957–1958, capitalizing on the early rise of rock and roll in Northern Europe, Egmond introduced low-cost electric models that experienced enormous demand. These guitars were notably adopted by Indo-Rock groups, a genre specific to the Indonesian community that flourished in the Netherlands at the time.

The company initially operated from facilities in Aalst. In the early 1960s, there were 80 employees producing 2,000 guitars per week. After a factory fire, the company relocated to Best. On November 2, 1960, one year after Uilke's death, the new factory officially opened as "N.V. Musical Instrument Factory Egmond formerly Musica" on Randweg in Best.

In the 1960s Egmond was the largest luthier in Europe, known more for quantity than quality. Approximately 80% of production was exported, particularly to the United States. The cheapest models cost only 10% of comparable Gibson or Fender guitars. During most of the 1960s, the American market was tremendous for Egmond, shipping one container of guitars every week to New York.

During the 1960s production moved upmarket with more elaborate models covered in vinyl, comparable to German or Italian guitars of the era. The company also diversified its semi-acoustic and acoustic guitars. In 1972, C.F. Martin & Co. made a cooperation agreement with Egmond to manufacture guitars with the Vega brand based on Martin's designs. In 1979, Martin broke the cooperation agreement, and Egmond began making guitars under the ownership of Tolchin Instruments with the brand name Alpha.

=== Product range ===
In addition to guitars, Egmond manufactured bass guitars, banjos, mandolins, accordions, and amplifiers. The amplifiers were designed in collaboration with Philips and used Philips speakers and components. Early models like the V 820 (10W tube amplifier from 1961) succeeded the V 630 from the mid-1950s, while the V 1821 was a 30W tube amplifier. In the late 1960s, Egmond amplifiers were manufactured by Davoli and Steelphon in Italy.

Egmond also sold accessories including magnetic pickups (distributed under the Royal brand), complete equipped plates for electrifying acoustic guitars, and vibrato bridges.

Egmond instruments were distributed under numerous brand names in different markets: Alberti, Alex, Alfesta, Alpha, Caledonie, Combo, Dixieland, Frima, Goldene Harfe, Hi-Spot, Jester, Lido, Lion, Manhattan, Marizza, Miller, Orpheum, Roderich Paesold, Rosetti, Royal, Royalist, Stadium, Strad-O-Lin, Tonemaster, Vander, Vega, and Wilson. In the United Kingdom, Egmond guitars were marketed as Rosetti, after their London distributor.

In the 1970s and 1980s, when Boosey & Hawkes needed guitar manufacturing within their enterprise but only had violin manufacturer Roderich Paesold, they used that brand name for a series of guitars made by Egmond in Boxtel, just north of Best.

=== Decline and closure ===
Competition from cheap Korean instruments caused the American Egmond importer to shift to Korean manufacturers instead, ending all sales to America and placing Egmond in a difficult situation. In the 1970s, the company faced increasing difficulties. Quality remained relatively low despite attempts to produce more expensive models and jazz guitars.

Following a share exchange, Jaap Egmond acquired the Musica retail shop in Eindhoven while his brothers retained the factory. Gerard, the eldest brother, had already died by 1974. The three remaining brothers didn't speak to each other for years, though they eventually reconciled and attended each other's funerals.

In 1983 the Egmond company went bankrupt. The Musica shop continued operating in Hooghuisstraat until 2002.

== Notable musicians ==
Several prominent musicians used Egmond guitars in their early careers:

- George Harrison received an Egmond 105/0 (also called Egmond Toledo or Rosetti 276 in the UK) plywood acoustic beginner guitar as his first guitar for his thirteenth birthday in 1956. The instrument is now displayed in the Beatles Museum in Liverpool with an estimated value of one million euros.
- Brian May of Queen received an Egmond Toledo on his seventh birthday in 1954, which he had completely restored to "better than new" by Andrew Guyton in 2003.
- Paul McCartney used a Rosetti Solid 7 during the Beatles' first stay in Hamburg. He re-strung it with four piano strings to convert it into a bass when the group was without a bassist (Stuart Sutcliffe having stayed in Germany).
- Peter Koelewijn remained loyal to the brand until 1964.
- Les Chaussettes Noires (French rock band) featured two Egmond Solid 7 guitars on the covers of their first three EPs and during their first television appearance.
- David Hilowitz of Manwomanchild plays an Egmond Typhoon 2V.
- Endorsement deals were arranged with Trini Lopez and Peter Koelewijn, who received large jazz guitars as gifts in exchange for being photographed with them.
- Roy Orbison also used Egmond guitars.
- The Tielman Brothers, famous Indo-rock musicians, were Egmond users.

== Notable models ==
=== Budget instruments ===
Egmond's very inexpensive guitars from the 1950s were the most economical available in Europe, competing in the low-end market only with other Dutch manufacturers such as Venlonia (Famos brand), Top Tuner, and Symphonie.

The Egmond guitars had uninspiring model designations with letters and numbers in confusing combinations. To popularize the guitars, the company introduced the 7-series: the Lucky 7, the Solid 7, and the Bass 7. The Lucky 7 was actually model JG113/5CA. The Lucky 7 series, small jazz guitar imitations available with or without pickups, had a reputation for being barely playable and of dubious quality but served as first instruments for thousands of aspiring guitarists.

=== Toledo series ===
The Toledo 105/0 (marketed as Rosetti 276 in the UK) was one of Egmond's most famous models, notably owned by George Harrison and Brian May.

=== Solid 7 series ===
Egmond is particularly known for the Solid 7 electric guitar series, manufactured between 1958 and 1963 (also available as the Bass 7). Despite their thin body and name suggesting solid construction, these very basic guitars were actually hollow-bodied, though their shape matched the archetype of electric guitars of that era. The Solid 7 was available with 2 or 3 pickups, with the 3-pickup version including tremolo. Around 1960, the Solid 7 models flooded the Belgian and French markets and became inseparable from the explosion of rock music in those regions.

=== Higher-end models ===
Egmond also produced higher-quality instruments. The Egmond 2 and 3 (later called Egmond Thunder) had 2 or 3 pickups respectively. The Egmond 2V and 3V (later called Egmond Typhoon) had vinyl-covered bodies with a body shape similar to the Fender Jaguar or Fender Jazzmaster. A more advanced and luxurious guitar with the same body shape was the Egmond Tempest. A simpler and cheaper version with the same body shape was the Egmond Scout, which had a simple solid un-chamfered body equipped with an externally attached combined pickguard and pickup (same as Solid 7).

== Legacy ==
The Egmond brand remains associated with 1950s and 1960s rock and roll and beat music. In 2009, collector Wim Markenhof published the first book about Egmond guitars. A 512-page comprehensive study by researcher Cees Bakker appeared subsequently, with a foreword by Brian May.

Joep Egmond, grandson of founder Uilke and son of Jaap, later became a renowned painter who exhibits regularly. He also works as an auctioneer for Catawiki's musical instruments department, describing himself as "the very last Egmond involved in the trade of musical instruments." He has been in contact with Brian May about the possibility of producing a limited edition reproduction of May's 1954 Toledo guitar.

AudioOne in Canada owns the Egmond brand and had plans to re-launch a series of refreshed Egmond guitars made with modern materials and parts, but the project halted in 2011 when the designer passed away.
