= Graffiti6 =

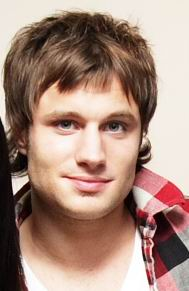

Background information
- Origin: London, England, United Kingdom
- Genres: Indie pop, alternative, folk, soul
- Years active: 2009–present
- Labels: NWFree Music, Capitol
- Members: Jamie Scott; TommyD

Graffiti6 is a musical collaboration founded in London in 2009. Made up of Jamie Scott (songwriter and lead vocals) and Tommy "D" Danvers (producer and songwriter). Graffiti6 are known for their "blend of characterful voice and crisp, intricate groove created from an infectious alliance of electric piano and offbeat guitar".

== Career ==
=== Beginnings ===
Singer/songwriter Jamie Scott and producer/songwriter TommyD started collaborating in 2008. Both London-based multi-instrumentalists, they began making music together in 2009 under the name Graffiti6. Initially, Scott was considering working with a producer to repackage a solo album, when an A&R executive at Polydor suggested he meet Danvers. Scott introduced Danvers to "an idea...for a folk thing", which would later become the track "Stare Into the Sun", their first collaboration. The track, first done on acoustic guitar, was developed further by Danvers. It was submitted to The Sun newspaper and was chosen as the soundtrack for a TV ad campaign for the newspaper.

=== Career ===
Rather than repackage Scott's solo album and have Danvers produce it, the two decided to create original material together. The exposure that the duo received through The Sun campaign encouraged them to write and record more material – including "Annie You Save Me", "Free", and "Stone In My Heart" – in addition to some covers.

The group decided to release their music on their own label, NWFree Music. "Stone In My Heart", an EP containing 4 tracks, was released in March 2010. "Annie You Save Me" was released as a single in July 2010. Graffiti6's debut album, Colours, released in the United Kingdom in October 2010. After signing to Capitol Records in April 2011, a version was also released in the United States on 24 January 2012.

Graffiti6 was named New Band of the Day at The Guardian newspaper (UK) and an Artist to Watch at LP33. Their songs have been used on such shows as Grey's Anatomy, Covert Affairs, Elementary, CSI: NY, One Tree Hill, VH1's Basketball Wives, VH1's Football Wives, Suits, Free Agents, The Secret Circle, the film What to Expect When You're Expecting, and the video games FIFA 12 and Dirt 3. In November 2010, they were nominated for mtvU's The Freshman title.

Graffiti6's track "Free" was chosen as iTunes Single of the Week. In March 2012, VH1 picked them for their You Oughta Know Artist on the Rise and VEVO picked them as Lift Artist for April and May 2012. They performed internationally at the Summer Well festival in Buftea, Romania.

They have performed on The Tonight Show with Jay Leno, Conan, Jimmy Kimmel Live! and the Late Show with David Letterman.

A song titled "Wash My Sins" was released on 14 May 2013. "Beside You" was released on 28 October 2013.

== Band members ==
- Jamie Scott - vocals, guitar, keyboards
- TommyD - guitar, vocals
- Pete Cherry - bass, vocals
- Leonn Meade - drums
- Joe Glossop - keyboards

The British artist and illustrator, Jimi Crayon, designs all of Graffiti6's artwork and is responsible for their bold logo and Technicolor visuals.

== Discography ==
=== Albums ===
Year	Album	Peak positions		Certification
Year	Album	NED	US	Certification
2010	Colours: Record label: NWFree Music (2010), Capitol Records (2012)	32	85	
2014	The Bridge: Record label: Independent	-	-	

=== EPs ===
- 2010: Stone in My Heart (NWFree Music)

(All songs by Jamie Scott & Tommy D)

1. "Stone In My Heart" (3:13)
2. "Foxes" (6:29)
3. "Starlight" (3:31)
4. "Stone in My Heart (Acoustic)" (2:51)

=== Singles ===
Year	Single	Peak positions				Certification	Album
Year	Single	BEL (Vl)	DEN	FR	NED	Certification	Album
2009	"Stare Into the Sun"	16 (Ultratip)	–	–	27		Colours
2010	"Free"	53 (Ultratip)	10	130	–		Colours

Other releases

- 2010: "Annie You Save Me"
- 2012: "Stare Into the Sun"
- 2014: "You Got the Sunshine"
