= Paper Scissors Stone (album) =

Studio album by Catatonia
- Released: 6 August 2001
- Recorded: 2001
- Studios: Rockfield (Monmouth, Wales)
- Genres: Alternative rock, post-Britpop
- Length: 47.11
- Label: Blanco y Negro
- Producers: Clive Langer and Alan Winstanley

Catatonia chronology
The Crai-EPs 1993/1994 (1999)	Paper Scissors Stone (2001)	Greatest Hits (2002)

Singles from Paper Scissors Stone
- 1. "Stone by Stone" Released: 23 July 2001

Professional ratings
Review scores
Source	Rating
AllMusic	1.5/5 stars
Dotmusic	8/10
The Guardian	3/5 stars
Sunday Tribune	3/5 stars

Paper Scissors Stone was the fourth and final album by Welsh band Catatonia. It was released on 6 August 2001 in the UK, and reached #6 on the UK album chart.

== Background ==
The album only had one single taken from it, "Stone by Stone" – the group's final single release. Fittingly, the ending of the video for the song features the band members all abandoning their instruments and walking away. The band had announced on their website that the next single was to be the rocky "Is Everybody Here on Drugs", although the announcement was quickly removed once it was clear that Catatonia were about to put an end to the band.

The band were unable to promote the album, albeit with the exception of an appearance on Later...with Jools Holland and a few performances of "Stone by Stone", as Cerys Matthews was being treated for alcohol addiction and nervous exhaustion. The band had to cancel their upcoming eight venue UK tour which was due to take place during September due to ongoing concerns with Matthews' recovery. A statement by the record label Warners said that Matthews would not have "recovered sufficiently" from her treatment for "anxiety and exhaustion."

The album's cover and in-sleeve photos were taken from the film, Tiger Bay, which starred Hayley Mills. Hayley was given a thank-you in the album. The album was dedicated to close friend and roadie Barry Cawley, who was killed in a road accident on his bicycle in Betws-y-Coed, North Wales in July 2000. The track, "Imaginary Friend", was written about him. The album title refers to the game rock paper scissors.

== Reception ==
Andy Gill of The Independent noted a feeling within some of the album's lyrics and song titles such as "Is Everybody Here on Drugs?", which felt like they mirrored her actual life. Gill commented: "Cerys's boozing is, on this showing, the least of the band's problems. More pressing, surely, is the glaring absence of a hook as memorable as 'Road Rage' or 'Mulder & Scully'; the closest they come here is the single 'Stone by Stone'." Caroline Sullivan in The Guardian said that "[Matthews] will always be an acquired taste, one that depends wholly on the strength of the songs. Ideally suited to pub singalongs, her warble is done justice by festival anthems such as Road Rage, but when pitted against anything heavy or balladish it tends to grate relentlessly." She also praised the single "Stone by Stone", saying it "gets it right." She concluded: "on balance it comes down to loving or hating that voice."

In 2006, Iain Forrester of Stylus Magazine said the album "certainly doesn’t deserve any of the hatred it received in the press at the time. It has a fire to match their debut and a much wider musical scope, taking in the string-laden melodrama of 'Godspeed' (which certainly suits Cerys Matthews' bellowing vocals) and flirtations with dance on 'What It Is,' as well as rock blasts like 'Immediate Circle'."

== Track listing ==
All tracks are written by Catatonia.

No.	Title	Length
1.	"Godspeed"	4:17
2.	"Immediate Circle"	2:53
3.	"Fuel"	3:27
4.	"What It Is"	3:29
5.	"Stone by Stone"	3:57
6.	"Mother of Misogyny"	3:34
7.	"Is Everybody Here on Drugs?"	3:07
8.	"Imaginary Friend"	3:18
9.	"Shore Leave"	3:17
10.	"Apple Core"	1:23
11.	"Beautiful Loser"	3:41
12.	"Blues Song"	3:27
13.	"Village Idiots"	2:45
14.	"Arabian Derby"	4:09

2015 reissue bonus tracks
No.	Title	Length
15.	"Apple Core" (Full Length Version)
16.	"Long Time Lonely"
17.	"Stone by Stone" (Radio Edit)

== Personnel ==
- Cerys Matthews – vocals
- Mark Roberts – guitar
- Owen Powell – guitar
- Paul Jones – bass
- Aled Richards – drums
