= Singing with the Enemy =

Singing with the Enemy is a 2007 BBC Three reality TV show that is based on the premise of putting two musical acts with very different styles together is a house for a week and challenging them to overcome their musical and personal prejudices and come up with a collaborative song merging their two different musical genres.

Top record producer Tommy D acts as the groups mentor.

The first series consists of six episodes with the following acts and genres

1. K Tron and Exploding Triangles (maverick performance artist band) featuring performance artist Theo Adams vs. Code 5 (vocal harmony 'boyband')
2. Paparazzi Whore (sex positive lesbian band) vs. Dweeb (Christian band)
3. Lyrically Scar'd (grime rap band) vs. Dirty Cakes (bohemian cabaret band)
4. Severed Heaven (female feminist metal band) vs. Lethal Fixx (male sleaze rock band)
5. Don Diva (female hip-hop/r&b band) vs. Apollo Strings (female classical string trio)
6. Fallen Angelz (female vocal pop band) vs. Amputated (male Brutal Death Metal/Grindcore band)
