= Don't Look Down (Cerys Matthews album) =

Studio album by Cerys Matthews
- Released: 6 October 2009
- Genre: Pop
- Length: 41:33
- Label: Rainbow City Recordings

Paid Edrych I Lawr cover
- Cover art for the Welsh version

Don't Look Down is the fourth studio album by Welsh singer-songwriter Cerys Matthews. It was released on 6 October 2009 by Rainbow City Recordings. A Welsh version of the album, entitled Paid Edrych I Lawr, was also released.

== Critical reception ==
Professional ratings
Review scores
| Source | Rating |
|---|---|
| AllMusic | 4/5 stars |
| Daily Express | 3/5 |

Elly Roberts of aligigs described Don't Look Down as "a drastic shift from her debut solo, Cockahoop and its follow-up Never Said Goodbye," describing it as "very, very impressive." Jon O'Brien of AllMusic gave the album a review of four out of five stars, describing it as "a captivating and often magical album which yet again establishes Matthews as a songwriting force to be reckoned with."

== Track listing ==
Don't Look Down — English version
| No. | Title | Length |
|---|---|---|
| 1. | "Arlington Way" | 3:31 |
| 2. | "Into the Blue" | 3:23 |
| 3. | "Aeroplanes" | 3:20 |
| 4. | "Spider & the Fly" | 3:42 |
| 5. | "It's What's Left (That Makes It Right)" | 2:02 |
| 6. | "Smash the Glass" | 3:35 |
| 7. | "Salutations" | 3:43 |
| 8. | "A Captain Needs a Ship" | 3:25 |
| 9. | "Evelyn" | 4:12 |
| 10. | "Oranges to Florida" | 3:03 |
| 11. | "Heron" | 4:18 |
| 12. | "Through a Glass" | 3:19 |
| Total length: | | 41:33 |

Paid Edrych I Lawr — Welsh version
| No. | Title | Length |
|---|---|---|
| 1. | "Arlington Way (Cymraeg)" | 03:31 |
| 2. | "Mae Angen Llong Ar Gapten" | 03:23 |
| 3. | "Carolina (Cymraeg)" | 03:59 |
| 4. | "Y Corryn ar Pry'" | 03:41 |
| 5. | "Y Gwydr Argyfwng" | 03:45 |
| 6. | "I Drive, Adref" | 03:46 |
| 7. | "Lleuad Gwener" | 04:06 |
| 8. | "Evelyn (Cymraeg)" | 04:14 |
| 9. | "Awyrennau" | 03:19 |
| 10. | "Orenau I Florida" | 03:04 |
| 11. | "Y Creyr" | 04:19 |
| 12. | "Trwy'r Drych" | 03:19 |
| 13. | "Rhyw Dachwedd yn Hwyr" | 02:27 |
| Total length: | | 47:17 |

== Charts ==
Chart performance of Don't Look Down
| Chart (2009) | Peak position |
|---|---|
| UK Albums (OCC) | 55 |
| UK Independent Albums (OCC) | 9 |
