= T in the Park 2001 =

Music festival in Scotland

T in the Park
- Dates: 7–8 July 2001
- Locations: Balado, Scotland, UK
- Years active: 1994 - present
- Website: https://tinthepark.com/

T in the park 2001 was a music festival held in Balado, Scotland. It took place on 7 and 8 July 2001, with approximately 50,000 people attending. The event was held despite the ongoing foot and mouth outbreak, unlike a number of other festivals at the time.

Stereophonics headlined the main stage on 7 July, while Texas were the headline act on the Sunday.

== Main stage ==
Saturday 7 July	Sunday 8 July
Stereophonics; David Gray; Placebo (band); James; Muse (band); The Dandy Warhols; The Strokes; Tom McRae	Texas; Beck; Coldplay; Toploader; Feeder; Shed Seven; Starsailor; Nikka Costa

== NME Stage ==
Saturday 7 July	Sunday 8 July
Catatonia; Paul Weller; Wheatus; The Proclaimers; My Vitriol; King Adora; Proud Mary; Biffy Clyro; Relish	JJ72; Ash; Grandaddy; Goldfinger; Cosmic Rough Riders; Astrid; Little Hell; Jimmy Eat World; Electrelane

== Slam Tent ==
Saturday 7 July	Sunday 8 July
Dave Clarke; Laurent Garnier; Carl Craig; H Foundation; Jon Carter; Circulation; DJ Q; Sidewinder / Paul Cawley	Slam (Live); Luke Slater; Josh Wink; X-Press 2; Doc Martin; Pete Tong; Silicone Soul

== King Tut's Tent ==
Saturday 7 July	Sunday 8 July
The Divine Comedy; Nelly Furtado; Lambchop; Elbow; Webb Brothers; Lowgold; Turin Brakes; Gloss; Esther	Stereo MC's; Tricky; Alabama 3; Arab Strap; Alfie; Snow Patrol; Mull Historical Society; The Bush the Tree & Me; Mushtaq
