= TommyD =

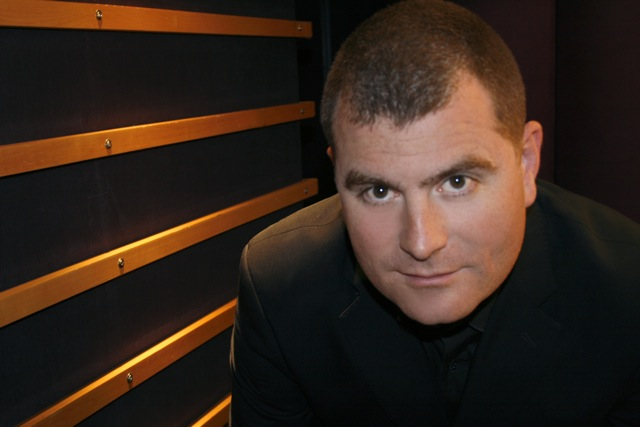
- TommyD, Music Man and one half of Graffiti6

Background information
- Born: Tommy Asher Danvers; London, England
- Years active: 1990–present
- Website: the1andonlytommyd.com

Tommy Asher Danvers, better known by his stage name TommyD, is a British producer, songwriter, arranger, DJ, and multi-instrumentalist and co-founder of NFT marketplace, Token||Traxx. He is best known for his work with artists such as Right Said Fred, Catatonia, KT Tunstall, Corinne Bailey Rae, and Graffiti6. He has also worked with Kylie Minogue, Janet Jackson, Noel Gallagher, Sophie Ellis-Bextor, Kanye West, Jay Z, Beyoncé, Adele, Emeli Sandé, and fun.

== Early career ==
Born in London, to an actor father and a chef and restaurateur mother. He credits his initial interest in music to the varied sounds and cultures of his family home and the surrounding capital city. TommyD's musical career began at the Elliott Comprehensive School in London. While in school, he performed as a guitarist, keyboardist, drummer, and singer in a number of South London-based bands of varying styles. Upon finishing his studies, he worked as an assistant in a commercial studio and additionally sold musical and studio equipment.

At the age of eighteen, Danvers began a thirteen-year career as a DJ by performing in a local South London club. Within a year, he made a name for himself, becoming a resident at The Wag Club and The Limelight, running several successful nights with DJ DB. He also created his own record label in 1988.

Through his friendship with Justin Berkmann, TommyD helped to develop Ministry of Sound, where he became a resident DJ in 1992 and toured with the likes of CJ Mackintosh, Masters at Work, Todd Terry, and Roger Sanchez. He described his DJing style as underground soulful house, similar to the new house of Disclosure and Duke Dumont.

He was a regular DJ in venues such as Cream and Back To Basics in the United Kingdom, Space in Ibiza, and Danceteria, Mars, and Twilo in the United States. His DJ career included tours of South America, Europe, and the Far East, including a gig at the wedding of Adbullah II ibn al-Hussein and Rania al Yassin of Jordan.

He collaborated with the British dance, acid house, and techno group E-Zee Possee with Jeremy Healy, producing their album The Bone Dance.

While DJing at a club in South London, Danvers became friends with two brothers, Fred and Richard Fairbrass, who one night approached Danvers with a cassette of songs. After producing a demo and playing it for the Fairbrass brothers, who recorded as Right Said Fred, the trio worked together to record the song "I'm Too Sexy", which eventually reached the top ten in nine countries. Danvers went on to produce, program, and perform on their debut album Up, including follow-up singles "Don't Talk Just Kiss" and "Deeply Dippy."

TommyD also received remix credits for a number of artists' club and radio releases in the 1990s, including Heaven 17, Björk, A Tribe Called Quest, Billy Ocean, Michael Jackson, and Jethro Tull.

In 1993, Danvers, in collaboration with house music DJ Roger Sanchez, co-wrote and produced the single "D-Day" as a duo of the same name.

He also collaborated with Little Louie Vega and Kenny "Dope" Gonzalez of Masters at Work on their track "Voices in My Mind", released in 1994 under the name Voices.

Additionally, he partnered with DJ Fat Tony to form the duo Fierce Child, releasing an EP titled Men Adore… in 1995 and another single, "Gonna Getcha", in 1996.

== Producing and writing ==
Combining his studio knowledge and his DJing experience, Danvers began to produce for other bands. His work with Wales alternative rock band Catatonia led to two chart-topping albums, 1998's International Velvet and 1999's Equally Cursed and Blessed, which produced five top-ten singles and resulted in nominations for the Mercury Music Prize and the Brit Awards. For his work on Equally Cursed and Blessed, Danvers earned a Best Producer nomination at the Q Awards in 2000. Additional production credits followed for artists like Finlay Quaye, Eagle-Eye Cherry, and Jennifer Paige in the early 2000s.

In 1999, Danvers produced a cover version of "Baby, It's Cold Outside" with Cerys Matthews and Tom Jones for Jones's 1999 album, Reload.

In the early 2000s, Danvers wrote and produced "More More More," the opening track from Kylie Minogue's eighth studio album Fever. He also wrote and produced "I Believe" on Sophie Ellis-Bextor's debut album Read My Lips.

Danvers went on to help develop the careers of new United Kingdom artists KT Tunstall and Corinne Bailey Rae, with credits on each artist's chart-topping debut albums. He co-wrote two tracks, "Under the Weather" and "Stoppin' The Love," on Tunstall's 2004 debut album Eye to the Telescope, and "I'd Like To" on Bailey Rae's self-titled 2006 debut.

In 2021, Danvers co-founded Token||Traxx alongside award winning music producer Miles Leonard and other industry heavyweights. Through blockchain and Decentralised Finance (DeFi) technology, the Token||Traxx platform is set to create a whole new income stream to support the traditional and established music community.

== Graffiti6 ==
While continuing to work with different artists as a producer and songwriter, Danvers met singer-songwriter Jamie Scott, who had just released the album Park Bench Theories under the name Jamie Scott and the Town. While Scott was looking to work with new collaborators to repackage the album, an A&R executive at his label, Polydor, suggested he meet with Danvers. The two wrote the song "Stare into The Sun" together on acoustic guitar; when Danvers produced and sent back the track, Scott was surprised, originally expecting the sound to emulate that of Park Bench Theories, but enjoyed the wildly different sound so much that they decided to start writing original material together as a duo, collaborating with artist and illustrator Jimi Crayon and calling themselves Graffiti6.

Graffiti6 first released their debut album, Colours, on their own independent label, NWFree Music, in October 2010. In April 2011, the duo signed to Capitol Records and re-released the album the following year, with the single "Free" reaching radio charts in the United States, Scandinavia, the Netherlands, and Belgium. Music from the album received syncs for a multitude of TV series and advertising campaigns, including Grey's Anatomy, CSI: NY, Covert Affairs, Victoria's Secret, Hollister, Heineken, MTV, VH1, A second album, The Bridge, was released independently in April 2014.

== Other work ==
In 2007, Danvers was the groups mentor on the BBC Three reality TV series Singing with the Enemy.

He has also contributed production, orchestration, and arrangements for Wired Strings, the orchestral collective founded by his wife, Rosie. With Wired Strings, Danvers has produced songs for artists such as Noel Gallagher, the Spice Girls, Kanye West, Jay Z, Adele, Tinie Tempah, Emeli Sandé, fun., Raleigh Ritchie, MNEK, Frank Ocean, Enya, and Beyoncé.

As part of the Music Producers Guild, he is currently spearheading the Credit Where Credit Is Due campaign, an initiative encouraging the inclusion of music professionals' credits and liner notes within the digital domain.

In 2014, he created The 8O8 Drinks Company, which released a whisky in early 2015.

He is a landlord with a property in London.
