= Jeff Irwin =

American musician

- Birth name: Jeffrey Matthew Irwin
- Born: September 12, 1977 (age 48) Creve Coeur, Missouri, U.S.
- Genres: Alternative rock, experimental, electronica, jazz
- Occupation(s): Musician, songwriter, producer
- Instrument(s): piano, violin, viola, trumpet, guitar, bass guitar, contrabass, baritone horn, euphonium horn, drums, synthesizers, melodica, mandolin, tin whistle, alto recorder, cowbell
- Years active: 1995-present
- Labels: Rocketown Records for Taylor Sorensen, Netwerk for Griffin House, Rough Trade for Cerys Matthews, Columbia/Aware for Mat Kearney
- Website: Jeff Irwin's MySpace; Irwin Music's MySpace

Jeff Irwin (born September 12, 1977) is an American musician and multi-instrumentalist. He has performed with Griffin House, Cerys Matthews, Derek Webb and Sandra McCracken, Mat Kearney, Taylor Sorensen & the Trigger Code, and Counting Crows.

== Early life ==
Born in Creve Coeur, Missouri, Irwin grew up in St. Louis County. Growing up, he studied piano, violin (learning the Suzuki method), viola, trumpet, guitar, bass guitar, contrabass, baritone horn, and various synthesizers. Irwin also received vocal training by participating in various area choirs. He wrote and performed an overture for his 4th grade class' musical production of Magellan.

== Education and career ==
In high school, he formed his first band, The Mafia. The band was focused on both performing cover songs and writing original music. They sometimes doubled as an instrumental jazz combo, playing parties and corporate functions. This was a catalyst for his involvement in school orchestras, jazz ensembles, choirs, and musical productions.

In college, Irwin performed more as a bassist than as a singer/songwriter. From 1996 to 1999, while living in Bolivar and Springfield, Missouri, he played in a ska band as well as various jazz groups. In 1999, he moved to Nashville, Tennessee to attend Belmont University. He immediately began writing and performing with numerous groups, from rock bands to orchestras.

Since 2008, Irwin has collaborated with The Deep Vibration, Griffin House, Tristen, The Bittersweets, Roman Candle, The Nashville Jazz Group, Thad Cockrell, Andrew Peterson, Randall Goodgame, Stephen Gordon, Sandra McCracken, Keegan DeWitt, Caitlin Rose, Andrew Combs, Rayland Baxter, Shelly Colvin, among others.

== Influences ==
Irwin cites John Entwistle, Tony Levin, Matt Malley, John Paul Jones, and Adam Clayton as the bassists who have most influenced his musical style.

== Selected recordings ==
- Taylor Sorensen's The Overflow, 2003
- Griffin House's Homecoming, 2006
- Cerys Matthews' Never Said Goodbye, 2006
- Landon Pigg Coffeeshop, 2008
- Peter Bradley Adams Leavetaking, 2008
- Roman Candle's Oh Tall Tree in the Ear 2009
- Thad Cockrell's To Be Loved LP 2009
- Griffin House's The Learner 2010
