= Aled Richards =

- Born: 1969 (age 56–57); Wales
- Genres: Alternative rock, Britpop, indie rock, folk rock, pop rock
- Occupation: Drummer
- Years active: 1990s–present
- Formerly of: Catatonia

Aled Richards (born in 1969) is a Welsh drummer and was a member of the Welsh rock band Catatonia.

== Early life ==
Richards started to play drums when he was young, born and living in Wales. Richards joined the band Catatonia in 1996, who were on the verge of signing a deal with the major record label, Warner Brothers.

== Catatonia ==
Richards joined Catatonia when they were signing a deal with Warner Brothers

Richards played with the band in all of their shows ranging from Glastonbury Festival to playing in Wembley in support of NetAid and TV performances such as Later... with Jools Holland, and Top Of The Pops. After their rise to fame with their second album International Velvet, and subsequent success with third release Equally Cursed and Blessed, they returned in 2001 with their fourth studio album, Paper Scissors Stone. During promotional appearances for this album it became clear that Matthews was not coping well with the increased pressure, suffering from anxiety and nervous exhaustion, which resulted in the cancellation of several tour dates, and a deterioration in the relationships between the band members. On 21 September 2001, the band officially split and Richards took a break from the music industry to spend time with his children.

== After Catatonia ==
Although Richards is still involved in bands such as Killing For Company and working with other artists, he spent his time after the band with his young family. He then went into teaching and was a music technology lecturer at Coleg Sir Gar in Llanelli, Wales. He is currently a freelance musician.
