= Cockahoop =

Studio album by Cerys Matthews
- Released: 19 May 2003
- Studio: Three Trees Studios, White Creek, Tennessee, United States
- Label: Blanco y Negro
- Producer: Bucky Baxter

Cerys Matthews chronology
| Cockahoop (2003) | Never Said Goodbye (2006) |

Singles from Cockahoop
- 1. "Caught in the Middle"

Professional ratings
Review scores
| Source | Rating |
|---|---|
| AllMusic | 4/5 stars |

Cockahoop is Cerys Matthews' first solo album, released in 2003. It peaked at number 30 on the UK Albums Chart, spending five weeks therein.

== Track listing ==
1. "Chardonnay" (w, m: Roger Cook, Hugh Cornwell) – 3:04
2. "Caught in the Middle" (m: Cerys Matthews, Fred Ball, Hadrian Gerrards; w: Cerys Matthews) – 3:12
3. "Louisiana" (m: Cerys Matthews, Ketcham Secor; w: Cerys Matthews) – 2:21
4. "Weightless Again" (m: Brett Sparks; w: Rennie Sparks (The Handsome Family) – 3:02
5. "Only a Fool" (w, m: Cerys Matthews) – 2:47
6. "La Bague" (trad. arr: Cerys Matthews) – 0:40
7. "...Interlude..." (AKA "The Miller of Hooterville") (trad. arr: Bucky Baxter) – 0:46
8. "Ocean" (m: Cerys Matthews, Antony Genn, Martin Slattery; w: Cerys Matthews) – 2:05
9. "Arglwydd Dyma Fi" (trad. arr: Cerys Matthews) – 3:35
10. "If You're Lookin' For Love" (w, m: James Stallard, Cerys Matthews) – 2:56
11. "The Good in Goodbye" (w, m: Cerys Matthews) – 3:05
12. "Gypsy Song" (m: Cerys Matthews, Martin Slattery, Joe Strummer; w: Cerys Matthews) – 3:49
13. "All My Trials" (trad. arr: Cerys Matthews) – 3:11

== Personnel ==
- Bucky Baxter – producer, electric guitar, fiddle, vibraphone
- Richard Bennett – guitar, bouzouki, banjo
- Ken Coomer – drums
- Eric Darken – marimba, vibraphone
- Lloyd Green – pedal steel guitar
- Jim Hoke – multi-instrumentalist
- Glenn Worf – bass
- Jonathan Yudkin – fiddle
- Chad Brown – recording and mixing (at Three Trees Studios, White Creek, Tennessee)
- Greg Fogie - recording engineer

== Charts ==
Chart performance of Cockahoop
| Chart (2003) | Peak position |
|---|---|
| UK Albums (OCC) | 30 |
