= Mason Neely =

American drummer

- Origin: United States
- Occupation(s): Record Producer, Drummer, Arranger, Composer, Sound Engineer
- Instrument(s): Drums, Guitar, Keyboards, Bass, Pedal Steel, Lap Steel, Banjo, Vibraphone
- Years active: 1997—present

Mason Neely (born April 20, 1979) is an American-born, UK-based record producer, drummer, orchestral arranger and multi-instrumentalist who has produced and arranged for and toured with artists including; Lambchop, Cerys Matthews, Sufjan Stevens, Saint Etienne (band), Diane Birch, Julian Ovenden, Lee Mead, The Revival Hour, Leigh Nash, DM Stith, Gulp, Laura Wright, Martyn Joseph, Louise Dearman, Luke Jackson, Natalie Duncan, Colorama, Paper Aeroplanes, The Gregory Brothers.

He has served as a composer, arranger and musical director for the BBC, RTÉ and S4C networks and scored advertisements for Best Buy, Cisco Systems, Domino's Pizza and Crispin, Porter and Bogusky. As an orchestral arranger, he has done pieces for the BBC and RTÉ Orchestras, the BBC Proms, the London Sinfonietta and the National Orchestra of Wales and the Welsh National Ballet.

In early 2013, he became a regular contributor on Cerys Matthews' Sunday morning BBC Radio 6 Music broadcast.

He composed the music for S4C series Lan A Lawr and features Beca and Y Streic a fi in early 2015. He has also received two awards from the National Eisteddfod of Wales: the first in recognition of Cerys Matthews' 2007 release Awyren=Aeroplane (which he produced and co-wrote) and the second for his production, mixin and orchestration of Bendith's 2016 self-titled release, which won the Best Welsh Language Album of the year in 2017.
