= Cerys Matthews =

Welsh singer-songwriter (born 1969)

Cerys Matthews OBE
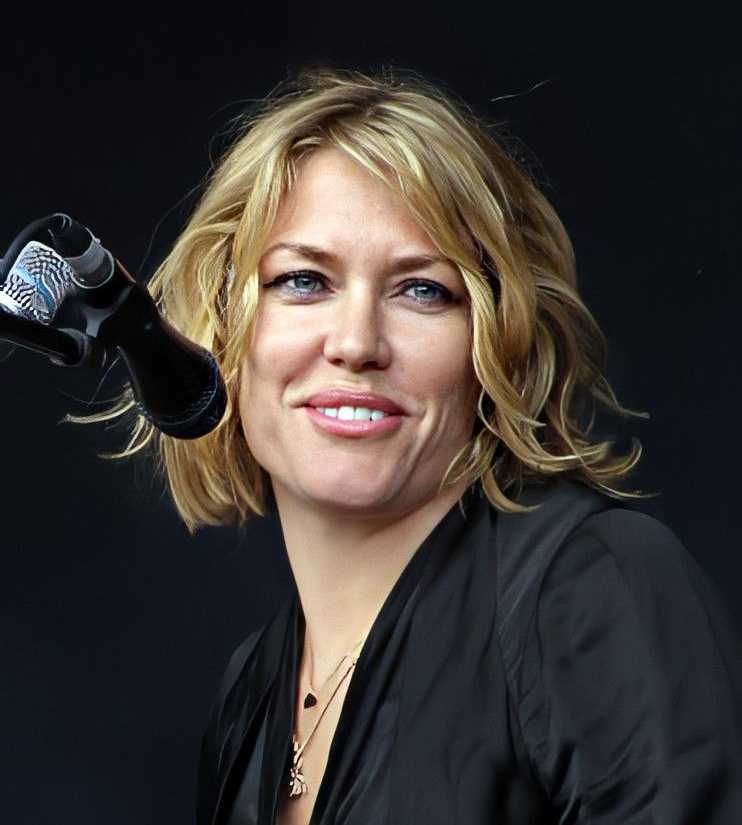
- Matthews at Glastonbury in 2008

Background information
- Born: Cerys Elizabeth Matthews; 11 April 1969 (age 57); Cardiff, Wales
- Origin: Swansea, Wales
- Genres: Alternative rock; Cool Cymru; Britpop; indie rock; pop rock; folk
- Occupations: Singer; songwriter
- Years active: 1990–present
- Formerly of: Catatonia
- Website: Cerys Matthews

Cerys Elizabeth Matthews OBE (/ˈkɛrɪs/; born 11 April 1969) is a Welsh singer, songwriter, author, and broadcaster. She was a founding member of Welsh rock band Catatonia and a leading figure in the "Cool Cymru" movement of the late 1990s.

Matthews now hosts a weekly music show on BBC Radio 6 Music, a weekly blues show on BBC Radio 2, and from 2021-2024 co-hosted a weekly show on BBC Radio 4, Add To Playlist, which won the Prix Italia and Prix Europa 2022. She also makes documentaries for television and radio and was a roving reporter for The One Show.

She founded The Good Life Experience, a festival of culture and the great outdoors in Flintshire in 2014, and is author of Hook, Line and Singer, and Where the Wild Cooks Go, both published by Penguin Books, and children's stories Tales from the Deep and Gelert, A Man's Best Friend, published by Gomer. Matthews' illustrated version of Dylan Thomas's Under Milk Wood was published, in November 2022, by Weidenfeld & Nicolson. In 2024 Cerys Matthews published a new collection of Dylan Thomas poems Out of Chaos Comes Bliss, some previously unpublished, with notes, through Pushkin Press.

== Early life ==
Matthews was born in Cardiff, the second of four siblings. The family relocated to Swansea when she was seven. She went to Ysgol Bryn y Môr Welsh language school until 11 years of age. She later attended St Michael's School, Llanelli and Fishguard Comprehensive School, when she lived in the Pembrokeshire village of Trefin, and Bryanston School, an independent school in Dorset, England.

She has cited her childhood heroes as being Pippi Longstocking and writers William Butler Yeats and Dylan Thomas.

Matthews learned to play the guitar at the age of nine, sang Welsh folk songs and taught herself traditional songs from all over the world, including blues and Irish folk songs. She was a member of the West Glamorgan Youth Orchestra. She had a stint in Spain as a nanny, where she learned to speak Catalan.

== Career ==
=== Catatonia ===
Catatonia were formed in 1992, after Matthews met Mark Roberts. She subsequently sang lead vocals on, and co-wrote the music and lyrics for, the band's hits. Songs she co-wrote included "You've Got a Lot to Answer For", "Mulder and Scully", "Dead from the Waist Down", and "Road Rage". Matthews also played guitar on the earlier material before second guitarist Owen Powell joined the band. She also performed a single with the band Space named "The Ballad of Tom Jones", which tells the story of two lovers who want to kill each other, but then hear a Tom Jones song that defuses their homicidal feelings. Matthews later collaborated with Jones to record a version of Frank Loesser's "Baby, It's Cold Outside" on Jones's 1999 album Reload. Matthews was voted the "Sexiest Female in Rock" in a 1999 readers' poll in the now-defunct magazine Melody Maker.

After Catatonia's rise to fame with their second album International Velvet, and subsequent success with Equally Cursed and Blessed, the band returned in 2001 with their fourth studio album, Paper Scissors Stone. In September 2001, the band officially split.

=== 2000s ===
Matthews joined the Pet Shop Boys on the Pyramid Stage at Glastonbury in June 2000, performing a duet of their hit "What Have I Done to Deserve This?". In December 2001, she returned to the recording studio for the first time since Catatonia split up. She recorded a song in both English and Welsh for the pre-school cartoon series Sali Mali. She provided guest vocals on the track "Cyclops Rock", from US alternative rock band They Might Be Giants 2001 album Mink Car. Her line was originally supposed to be provided by Joe Strummer of the Clash. Cerys went on to co-write Gypsy Song with Strummer on her Cockahoop album released by Rough Trade in 2003.

In May 2001, sang for former US President Bill Clinton at the Hay Festival performing traditional Welsh and American folk songs, including "Lisa Lan" and "How Can I Keep From Singing". Cerys has subsequently become vice president of Hay Festival of Literature and Arts. Also in 2001, recorded a duet of the classic "Young at Heart" for television with the legendary harmonica virtuoso Larry Adler, backed by a 16-piece orchestra; this was one of Adler’s final recordings before he died in August that year at the age of 87.

Matthews moved to Nashville, Tennessee, in 2001. On her arrival she began playing with Bucky Baxter, who had played lap steel guitar for Bob Dylan and Ryan Adams. She had already collected 76 traditional folk songs with the idea of making an album of folk covers. Her debut album, Cockahoop, ended up consisting mainly of her own songs. It was recorded in seven months and appeared on Blanco y Negro Records in the United Kingdom in May 2003. While recording this album she met Seth Riddle, whom she married in Pembrokeshire on 22 February 2003. She toured the album around Britain with minimal promotion as she was several months pregnant at the time. The album's Stateside Records release followed in October 2004.

In December 2005, Matthews recorded a version of Len Barry's 1960s UK and US top-10 hit "1-2-3" in Nashville. She released it as a download-single with all profits going to a children's charity. In early 2006, Matthews introduced material from her then upcoming album at SXSW in Austin, Texas.

In 2006, Matthews conducted a short tour of the UK to promote her second solo album, Never Said Goodbye. The album was preceded by the single "Open Roads". Band members included Kevin Teel on guitar, Ben Elkins playing keyboards, Mason Neely on drums, and Jeff Irwin playing bass. She headlined Cardiff's Big Weekend festival. During September and October 2006, Matthews embarked on a UK and Ireland tour, during which she played tracks from her first two solo albums as well as three Catatonia hits. She also embarked upon a short acoustic Welsh tour in November 2006 before returning to Nashville for Christmas.

Matthews appeared on the 2007 series of ITV's I'm a Celebrity...Get Me Out of Here!, which aired from 12 to 30 November. She was voted off one day before the final episode, coming fourth behind Jason "J" Brown, Janice Dickinson and eventual winner Christopher Biggins. Matthews became involved with fellow contestant Marc Bannerman after the show, but they split four months later. Matthews appeared at the live Guilty Pleasures concert at the Hackney Empire, London in 2007. She performed the Bonnie Tyler hit "Total Eclipse of the Heart" and the Dolly Parton/Kenny Rogers duet "Islands in the Stream" along with Terry Hall and the BBC Concert Orchestra.

In an interview on the eve of the launch of her Welsh mini-album Awyren = Aeroplane, Matthews confirmed she had divorced from Riddle and temporarily moved back to her farm in Pembrokeshire. Awyren = Aeroplane won her the "Contemporary Composition" award in the National Eisteddfod. The award had been resurrected and presented for the first time since 1936. In 2007, Matthews became Vice-President of the Welsh homelessness charity Shelter Cymru. She also accepted a role of Performing Arts Ambassador for Linden Lodge School, Wimbledon in the same year.

Matthews joined the Welsh band Manic Street Preachers onstage at The O2 on 28 February 2008 to sing the female vocals of their 2007 hit "Your Love Alone Is Not Enough" as part of the NME Awards celebrations that year. She replaced Nina Persson in both the awards ceremony (within indigO2) and at the following "Big Gig" live show (within The O2 Arena).

Also in 2008 collaborated with legendary blues musician David "Honeyboy" Edwards, a contemporary and friend of Robert Johnson during an S4C documentary on the people and history of the Mississippi River, Yr Afon: Cerys ac Afon Mississippi. Cerys subsequently met Algia Mae Hinton and Precious Bryant on further musical road trips across Arkansas, Georgia and the Southern States of the US.

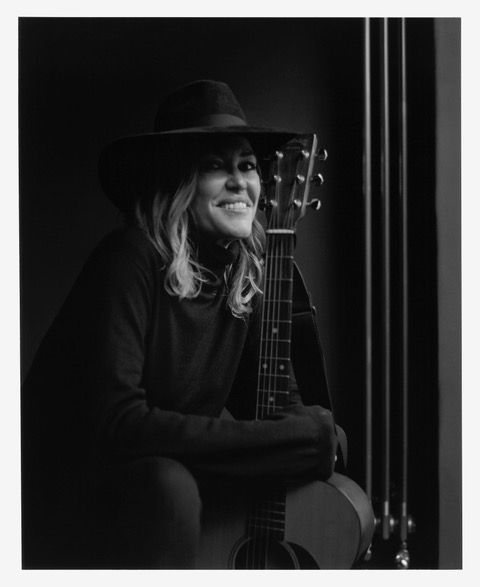
Ladbroke Grove, London, 10 August 2024

From November 2008, Matthews sat in for Stephen Merchant and Marc Riley on BBC 6 Music and went on to present George Lamb's slot in April 2009. In May 2009, she presented the show A Month of Sundays With... Cerys Matthews. She then covered for Nemone on 6 Music from July 2009, while Nemone was on maternity leave.

Matthews herself began maternity leave on 23 November 2009 - earlier than planned due to pre-eclampsia and an emergency Caesarean - giving birth to her third child, Red, at 7 months gestation.

In April 2010, Matthews returned to 6 Music to present a weekend show on Sunday mornings which, to this day, she continues to programme and host. She produces and presents radio documentaries and shows, including Hook Line and Singer, where on Radio 4, she shared her love of fishing.

Matthews released her first CD in two years in October 2009. The album, titled Don't Look Down, was released in two versions, one in English and the other in Welsh (the title of the Welsh edition was Paid Edrych i Lawr). It was recorded in Providence, Rhode Island, Nashville, Seattle and London, and coincided with a two-week UK tour in October.

=== Since 2010 ===
In 2010, 2012, 2013 and 2014 was involved on the judging panel for the Swansea University Dylan Thomas Prize, one of the world's largest literary cash awards for writers under 39. Cerys subsequently has become a patron of the Dylan Thomas Society.

Matthews has covered Glastonbury Festival for both BBC Television and BBC 6 Music, she wrote and presented a BBC Two programme on poetry and presented TV documentaries on singer Dorothy Squires, the Mississippi River and Cuba. She wrote and presented a documentary on early blues players such as Memphis Minnie, children's character Pippi Longstocking, Mahalia Jackson and the celebrated British blues label "Blue Horizon". She has presented a documentary for BBC Radio 2 on Maida Vale Studios. She frequently contributes to BBC Radio 4 programmes such as Feedback, Frontrow, Loose Ends and Saturday Live, also writing a column for world music magazine Songlines.

In 2010, Matthews released Tir (in Welsh: "territory" or "land"), a collection of traditional Welsh songs, and of photographs from her family archive from the 1880s to 1940s of people at work and play. They included "Calon Lân", "Cwm Rhondda", "Migldi-Magldi" (sung as a duet with Bryn Terfel), "Myfanwy" and "Sosban Fach". This is the third release on her own label, Rainbow City.

Explorer is Matthews's fourth solo album (2011). In both selecting and writing the songs she delved into the influence of both the music she has heard round the globe, and the places she had visited. Recorded over seven days, the album from the outset had no pre-determined sound or calculated format. On the album she incorporates a little Spanish, Scottish, Irish, Welsh, and American sensibilities, styles, and genres. In April 2011, a video was released through Matthews's official YouTube Page of the lead single from Explorer, "Sweet Magnolia".

Matthews played the Isle of Wight and Hay festivals in 2012, the latter with a Woody Guthrie tribute show, and collaborated with artists such as Arun Ghosh, Tunde Jegede, Attab Haddad, Frank Moon and the London Bulgarian Choir. 2012 also saw Matthews play music from her collection of Welsh traditional songs Tir, with Ballet Cymru, ending in a show in Sadler's Wells, and a nomination for a Theatre Critics Award 2012.

For Christmas 2012, she produced and arranged Christmas album Baby, It's Cold Outside (2012) to much acclaim, recognised by the Sunday Times as an "essential seasonal album".

Matthews played UK literary festivals including Dartington, Chester, Hay and Edinburgh and released an album of traditional Welsh reels and songs, Hullabaloo. She sang Patsy Cline's "Crazy" and Bob Dylan's "Blowin' in the Wind" as part of the memorial service for esteemed War correspondent Marie Colvin, in May 2012. Also in 2012, Matthews appeared as a celebrity guest mentor for Tom Jones's team on the first series of the UK version of The Voice.

In 2013 - Wales was host country for WOMEX - Worldwide Music Expo, and Cerys designed/was Artistic Director of the opening concert at the Wales Millennium Centre, welcoming international music industry representatives and musicians to the world of Welsh culture and art.

In 2014, Matthews co-founded an interactive festival, The Good Life Experience, with Charlie and Caroline Gladstone, held every September on the Gladstone estate in Hawarden, Flintshire near the Cheshire border. It is a festival which celebrates the great outdoors, with abseiling, campfires, axe throwing, foraging, talk on survival, as well as cultural activities, crafts, books and music.

Also in 2014 Cerys served as a judge for the Forward Prizes for Poetry alongside broadcaster Jeremy Paxman and poets Dannie Abse, Vahni Capildeo, and Helen Mort.

In 2017 she was a guest presenter on the BBC's coverage of the Royal Welsh Show, along with Andi Oliver and Omar Hamdi. On 14 May 2018, Matthews took over from Paul Jones as the presenter of The Blues Show on BBC Radio 2.

In 2019, at a service of thanksgiving for the life and work of Jeremy, Lord Heywood of Whitehall, former Cabinet Secretary and Head of the Civil Service at Westminster Abbey, Cerys sang Dylan’s "Don't Think Twice, it’s All Right". Lady Heywood, the Prime Minister and former government ministers, representatives of HM the Queen, the Prince of Wales, and the Permanent Secretaries of government departments and hundreds of civil servants were in attendance, Sir Bryn Terfel sang "Suo Gân".

Also in 2019, to celebrate the twenty-fifth anniversary of National Poetry Day, Cerys curated Tell Me the Truth About Life, a widely acclaimed anthology. It featured poems nominated by the public and public figures, alongside works by Dylan Thomas, W.H. Auden and Emily Dickinson. Matthews was one of the three judges for the 2020 Countryfile Calendar, sold in aid of Children in Need.

In 2021 Cerys welcomed 10 contemporary poets including Lemn Sissay, Imtiaz Dharker and Belinda Zhawi to record at Abbey Road Studios. Then Cerys, along with Hidden Orchestra, set them to music with the resulting album, We Come From the Sun being released by Decca.

In 2021 Matthews made a pilot for a new BBC Radio 4 music programme called Add To Playlist, with Jeffrey Boakye. This emerged as a weekly Friday night show which Matthews presented and directed with Boakye from 2021 to 2024. Add to Playlist went on to win both the Prix Italia and Prix Europa in 2022.

In 2022 and 2023 Minneapolis' Theater Latté Da performed Cerys and Mason Neely’s A Child's Christmas in Wales by Dylan Thomas as a live staged musical.

In March 2025 she was guest of honour at the banquet for BBC's Great British Menu at Blenheim Palace.

Also in 2025 she sang her new compositions for Under Milk Wood in the British Embassy, Paris in collaboration with Qanun maestra, Maya Youssef. To mark St David’s Day and International Women’s Day with the British Ambassador to France, Dame Menna Rawlings, the First Minister of Wales, Eluned Morgan and the Poet Laureate of Wales, Mererid Hopwood.

== Awards and recognitions ==
Matthews won gold at the 2013 Sony Radio Academy Awards, winning in the "Music Broadcaster of the year" award for her show on BBC Radio 6 Music.

For her contribution to culture in 2014, Matthews won a St David Award – run by the Welsh government, in its inaugural year, 2014. She was appointed Member of the Order of the British Empire (MBE) in the 2014 Birthday Honours for services to music.

In July 2014 Matthews was awarded an honorary degree from Swansea University.

Matthews won the Best Presenter Music award at the Audio Production Awards on 23 November 2016.

In 2022 awarded the Prix Italia and Prix Europa in the music radio category for Add to Playlist. Also in 2022 was made an honorary fellow of Cardiff University.

In 2023 awarded an honorary Masters Degree by Leeds Arts University.

Matthews was appointed Officer of the Order of the British Empire (OBE) in the 2026 Birthday Honours for services to music.

== Personal life ==
Matthews has two sons and a daughter. In 2011 she married her second husband, Steve Abbott, who also has two children from his first marriage and they live in Buckinghamshire. In 2019, to celebrate her 50th birthday, Matthews took her 8 and 13-year-old sons and husband to hike to Everest Base Camp.

Matthews is fluent in English, Welsh, Spanish, and French.

== Discography ==
=== As a solo artist ===
Studio albums

- Cockahoop (UK No. 30) (Blanco y Negro – 2003)
- Beech Street Recordings (self-released – 2006)
- Never Said Goodbye (Rough Trade – 2006)
- Awyren = Aeroplane (mini-album) (My Kung Fu 030 – 2007)
- Don't Look Down (Rainbow City Recordings – 2009)
- TIR (Rainbow City Recordings – 2010)
- Explorer (Rainbow City Recordings – 2011)
- Baby It's Cold Outside (Rainbow City Recordings − 2012)
- Hullabaloo (Rainbow City Recordings – 2013)
- Dylan Thomas: A Child's Christmas, Poems and Tiger Eggs (Marvels of the Universe – 2014)
- We Come from the Sun with the Hidden Orchestra and 10 poets (Decca Records – 2021)

Singles

- "The Ballad of Tom Jones" (with Space) (1998, UK No. 4)
- "Caught in the Middle" (2003, UK No. 47)
- "1-2-3" (2005)
- "Open Roads" (2006, UK No. 53)
- "Some Kind of Wonderful" (with Aled Jones) (2007)
- "Arlington Way" (Rainbow City Recordings − 2009)
- "Into The Blue"/"Mae Angen Llong Ar Gapten" (Rainbow City Recordings − 2010)
- "Sweet Magnolia" (Rainbow City Recordings − 2011)

=== Other appearances ===
Appearances on other original recordings

- Space – Tin Planet, duetting on "The Ballad of Tom Jones" (1998)
- Tom Jones – Reload, on "Baby, It's Cold Outside" (1999)
- They Might Be Giants – Mink Car, guest vocals on "Cyclops Rock" (2001)
- Aled Jones – Reasons to Believe, duetting on "Some Kind of Wonderful" (2007)
- The Fron Male Voice Choir – Voices of the Valley: Home, singing "Calon Lan" (2008)
- MAVIS presents Candi Staton & Cerys Matthews, singing "Nemesis Required" (2010)

Appearances on compilations

- Brand New Boots and Panties!! (2001) – contributed "If I Was With a Woman"
- Listen to Bob Dylan: A Tribute (2005) – contributed "I Believe in You", a Bob Dylan song from Slow Train Coming
- Hands Across the Water (2006) – contributed "An Occasional Song"
- Songs for the Young at Heart (2007) – contributed "White Horses", the theme song to The White Horses
- Over the Rainbow (2007) – contributed "Secret Love"

== Bibliography ==
- Hook, Line and Singer, Matthews' collection of singalong classics published by Penguin, became a top-3 Sunday Times bestseller in 2013. The book includes personal anecdotes and song histories. Song examples are "Let's Go Fly a Kite", "Oh Susannah", and "Swing Low Sweet Chariot".
- Tales from the Deep (2011), Gwasg Gomer, Wales: Gomer Press Limited, ISBN 978-1-84851-312-9 Nominated for a People's Choice Award.
- Gelert, a Man's Best Friend (2014), Gwasg Gomer, Wales: Gomer Press Limited, ISBN 978-1-84851-464-5
- Where the Wild Cooks Go: Recipes, Music, Poetry, Cocktails (2019), Penguin UK, ISBN 978-1-84614-962-7
- Cerys Matthews' Under Milk Wood (2022), Weidenfeld & Nicolson, ISBN 978-147462-250-9
- Dylan Thomas, Out Of Chaos Comes Bliss: Essential Poems Selected By Cerys Matthews (2024), Pushkin Press, ISBN 978-1-80533-119-3
