= Mark Roberts (musician) =

- Born: 3 November 1967 (age 59); Llanrwst, Wales
- Genres: Rock, Britpop, alternative

Mark Roberts (born 3 November 1967) is a Welsh rock musician, first known as a founding member of Y Cyrff. He then met Cerys Matthews and formed Catatonia along with Paul Jones.

== Career ==
Roberts claimed for a number of years that he had stumbled across Matthews busking in Cardiff and offered her a guitar string she was missing, which led to their collaboration. The two had actually met busking, and were roommates by the time they formed the band. The string story was later revealed to be a fabrication by the band's publicist. Their split ended their songwriting partnership, and subsequently Roberts was responsible for much of the band's lyrical output.

In Catatonia, Roberts shared main songwriting duties with Matthews, whilst also playing guitar and providing backing vocals. After Catatonia split, Roberts worked as a record producer before co-founding Welsh rock band Sherbet Antlers with former Catatonia bass player Paul Jones, together with John Griffiths and Kevs Ford from the Welsh dance pioneer band Llwybr Llaethog.

Roberts and Jones went to form Y Ffyrc. By 2012, Roberts had formed a Cardiff-based soul-inspired band The Earth, with Dionne Bennett (of The Peth) and Dafydd Ieuan (of Super Furry Animals).
